= Turkish calligraphy =

History of calligraphy in Turkey

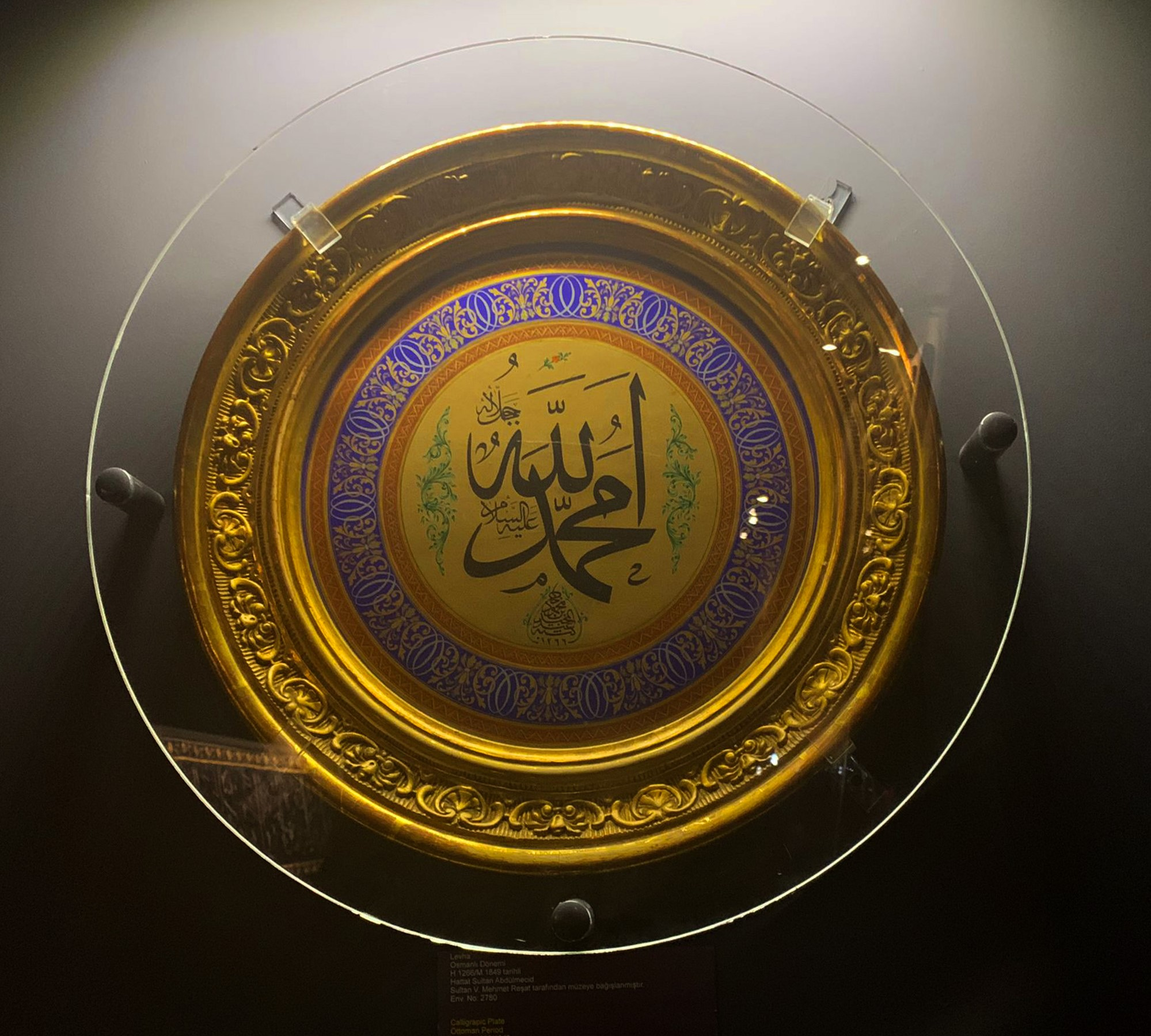
Made by Sultan Abdülmecid in 1849. It was donated to the Museum of Turkish and Islamic Arts by Mehmed V Reşâd

The art of Turkish calligraphy dates back to the seventh century. The Ottoman Turks migrated from Central Asia to establish an empire in Anatolia by 1299, and conquered Constantinople in 1453. The Ottoman Empire became a major European power. After the fall of the Mamluk Sultanate (1517), the Ottomans began to exert great influence over Islamic art and placed great emphasis on calligraphy. They collaborated with Egyptian and Persian calligraphers, adopting the naskh and thuluth scripts.

While other traditional Turkish art forms declined due to the influence of European techniques, styles, tastes, and imports, calligraphy has continued to flourish in Turkey until the present day. In 1928, the Arabic script was replaced with an altered version of the Latin alphabet in the Turkish Republic. However, with assistance from the Centre for Islamic Art and Culture IRCICA in Istanbul, new generations of Turkish calligraphers have continued to emerge. These include Ahmed Kâmil Akdik (1861–1941), Ismail Hakki Altunbezer (1873–1946), and Necmeddin Okyay (1883–1976).

== Turkish calligraphers ==
=== Ottoman period ===
- Mustafa Râkim (1757–1826) Ünye, Turkey
- Sheikh Hamdullah (1436–1520) Amasya, Turkey
- Hâfiz Osman (1642–1698) Istanbul, Turkey
- Hamid Aytaç (1891–1982) Diyarbakır, Turkey

=== Contemporary ===
- Hasan Çelebi (1937–2025) Erzurum, Turkey
- Mehmed Özçay (1944–) was born in Istanbul and began studying calligraphy at the age of 16 under the guidance of several renowned calligraphers, including Süleyman Saim Tekcan and Hamid Aytaç. He later studied at the Mimar Sinan Fine Arts University and went on to exhibit his calligraphy work in many countries around the world. He has won several awards for his work, including the Grand Prize at the International Calligraphy Competition, held in Tehran in 1997. In addition to his work as a calligrapher, he is also a teacher and has trained many students in the art of calligraphy.
- Rafet Güngör has been a calligrapher and leather craftsman since 1969. He was inspired by the works of Hamid Aytaç and has worked in the Süleymaniye Library in Istanbul for 25 years. Güngör went on to create more than 50,000 calligraphic paintings in various fonts ranging, from Osman font to Arabic calligraphy.

== Modern Ottoman female calligraphers ==
Female calligraphers first gained prominence in the modern period of the Ottoman Empire, when a rich and well-preserved tradition of calligraphic biography emerged. A renowned historian of Ottoman calligraphy, Mustakimzade (d. 1788/89), describes eleven women calligraphers in his account. These women were trained by their fathers and brothers and excelled in their art. One female calligrapher, Emine Servet Hanim, wrote nine hilyas for her ijaza in the year AH 1291 (1874 CE), at around the age of eighteen. An ijaza is a certificate of authorization to copy and reproduce calligraphy and is a vital part of the Ottoman calligraphy tradition. Hanim's nine hilyas, written in exquisite and intricate detail, were considered a significant achievement for a female calligrapher of the time. At present, it is kept in a private collection. Hafiza Khatun (d. 1830), who memorized and recited the Hadith, was proficient in both the Thuluth and Naskh scripts. In Baghdad, Al Hafiza Saliha al-Naqshali was a widely recognized calligrapher and scholar. She was the first female calligrapher of note in Arabic calligraphy. Among her calligraphic works was her Quran; Each page had ten lines: three lines of thuluth script, four lines of naskh below, and three lines of thuluth at the end.

== Tools ==
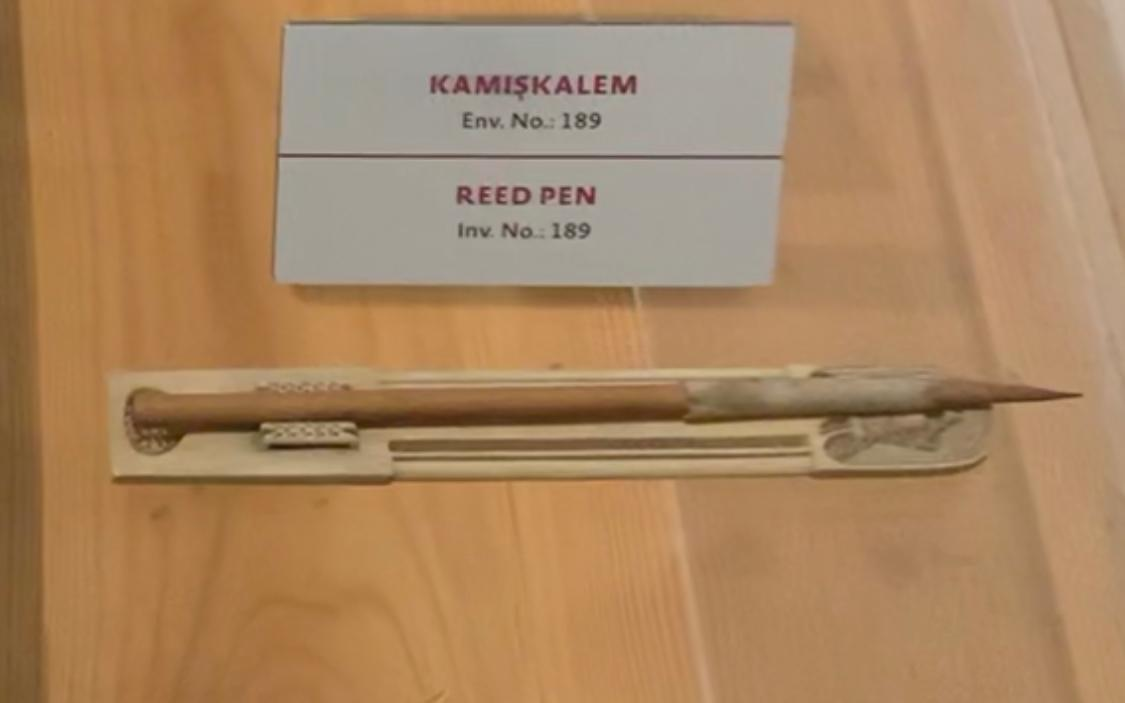
Turkish Reed Pen

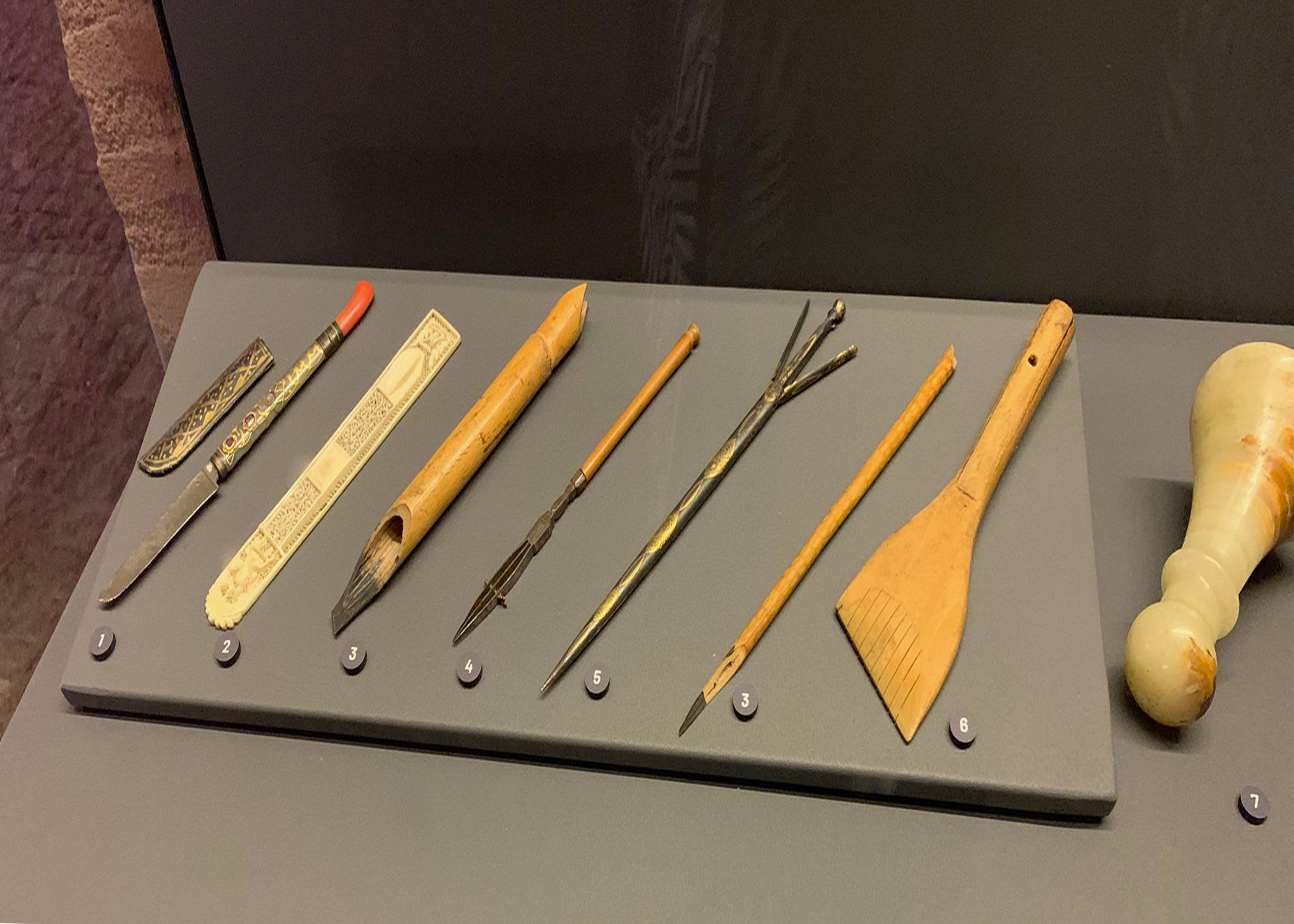
Wooden Calligraphy Tools, Ottoman Empire (Osmanlı İmparatorluğu)

Calligraphy is a form of writing that requires a specific type of pen made from a special kind of reed, ink made from soot, and special papers in order to practice. The reed is split lengthwise and divided into thin strips. The strips are next fused together to create the pen. The nib of the pen is angled so that it slants toward the calligrapher, who holds the pen so that the nib's edge completely rests on the paper. The most important component in calligraphy's aesthetic quality is the pen, since the pen produces the subtle effects and designs.

In calligraphy, black lines are generally produced with lampblack ink on a light background. For Ottoman calligraphy, the most common colors were yellow (zırnık); red, white, and gold. The pigments were made with a variety of chemicals and substances, including orpiment, tulips and white lead.

In previous centuries, paper purchased from the factory was not immediately usable. The raw paper was first colored, since it was typically white and strained the eyes. The surface was then sized with ‘âhâr,’ and lastly burnished with a tool known as a ‘çakmak mühre’ to smooth the surface and stabilize the ‘âhâr’ coating. This method continues to be used in modern calligraphy, resulting in glossy and smooth paper.

== Styles ==
There are several classical styles of Islamic calligraphy, which are known in Turkish as sulus, reyhani, rika, muhakkak, and tevki. The Turkish Calligraphers adapted these classical styles of Arab calligraphy and created their own new styles.

Sheikh Hamdullah (1429–1520) was the first notable calligrapher in the period of the Ottoman Empire. He was urged by his pupil Bayezid II (1481–1512) to develop his own distinctive style. Hamdullah's style later inspired Hâfiz Osman (1642–1688) a renowned calligrapher who went on to produce work that may be described as quintessential.

İsmail Zühdi (died in 1806) and Mustafa Râkim (1758–1826) were both significant calligraphers. Mustafa Rakim's greatest contribution to Turkish calligraphy is the cel stilus style advancement. Additionally, Rakim developed the tugra, which served as the king's seal. Another stylist, Sami Efendi, specialized in creating memorable vowel indicators and reading aids.

=== Stylistic evolution ===
The Ottoman calligraphy style continued to change without altering the basic shapes of the letters and incorporating the modern techniques that the calligrapher preferred. When Ottoman architecture, music, and fine art were modified by Western influences, calligraphy remained untouched. This was likely due to Europe's lack of calligraphic art forms and the master and apprentice system, which preserved established principles that were passed down from one generation to the next. There is a common saying in the Islamic world alluding to length of time that Turkish preserved the art in its purest form: “The Quran was revealed in the Hijazi; it was best recited in Egypt and best written in Istanbul.”

Turkish calligraphy first developed as a separate art form, but subsequently emphasis was placed on embellishing it with tezhip (gold illumination) and ebru (Turkish paper marbling). The illumination process was first developed in Iran in the early fifteenth century during the Timurid Period. By the end of the fifteenth century, the Ottomans had embraced the classical style. They employed decorative depictions of animals and plants to produce a classical ornamental style distinguished by its flat surfaces and vivid color scheme.

However, Ottoman illumination began to steadily deteriorate and lose its distinctiveness as it was influenced by Western art in the 18th century. Later, the art was rejuvenated by 20th-century painters who wished to recreate the classical techniques.

== Evolution of Turkish calligraphy ==
At present, Turkish calligraphy still plays a significant role in Islamic visual culture. Turkish calligraphy evolved into an art form over time, utilized to produce elaborate and innovative designs in sculpture and painting on canvas. Islamic traditional elements, such as spiritual ideas and religious stories, are frequently reflected in calligraphic artwork.

== Exhibitions ==
- Topkapı Palace: Ottoman Sultans resided in the Palace for four hundred years, and it is now home to a considerable collection of calligraphic artwork. Imperial decrees, Quranic manuscripts, and different Ottoman-generation calligraphic artifacts are on display within the museum.
- Sakıp Sabancı Museum: Sakıp Sabancı Museum is a renowned cultural institution called located in Istanbul. It features periodic exhibitions of modern art, Islamic art, and Turkish painting and sculpture.
- Turkish and Islamic Arts Museum: The last museum founded during the Ottoman period, the Turkish and Islamic Arts museum displays a wide variety of works by Turkish and Muslim artists.
- Pera Museum: A sizable collection of Quranic manuscripts, inscriptions, and panels that show how different Ottoman calligraphic styles evolved over time are on display in the Pera Museum in Istanbul.
- Sadberk Hanım Museum: Located in the Sarıyer neighborhood, the Sadberk Hanm Müzesi houses an assortment of Ottoman calligraphy, including Quranic manuscripts, imperial edicts, and other items.
- Istanbul Archaeology Museums: The Istanbul Archaeology Museums (Istanbul Arkeoloji Müzeleri) maintain a collection of artifacts, manuscripts, inscriptions, and calligraphic works from the Ottoman Empire.
- Galata Mevlevihanesi Müzesi: Dervish life and culture are displayed in the Galata Mevlevihanesi Müzesi along with calligraphic artwork. Located within the Mevlevi Monastery.
