= Ahmed Karahisari =

Ottoman calligrapher

Ahmed Karahisârî
- Born: Ahmed Şemseddin; 1468; Karahisar, Ottoman Empire
- Died: 1566 (aged 97–98); Istanbul, Ottoman Empire
- Known for: Islamic calligraphy
- Movement: Thuluth and Naskh

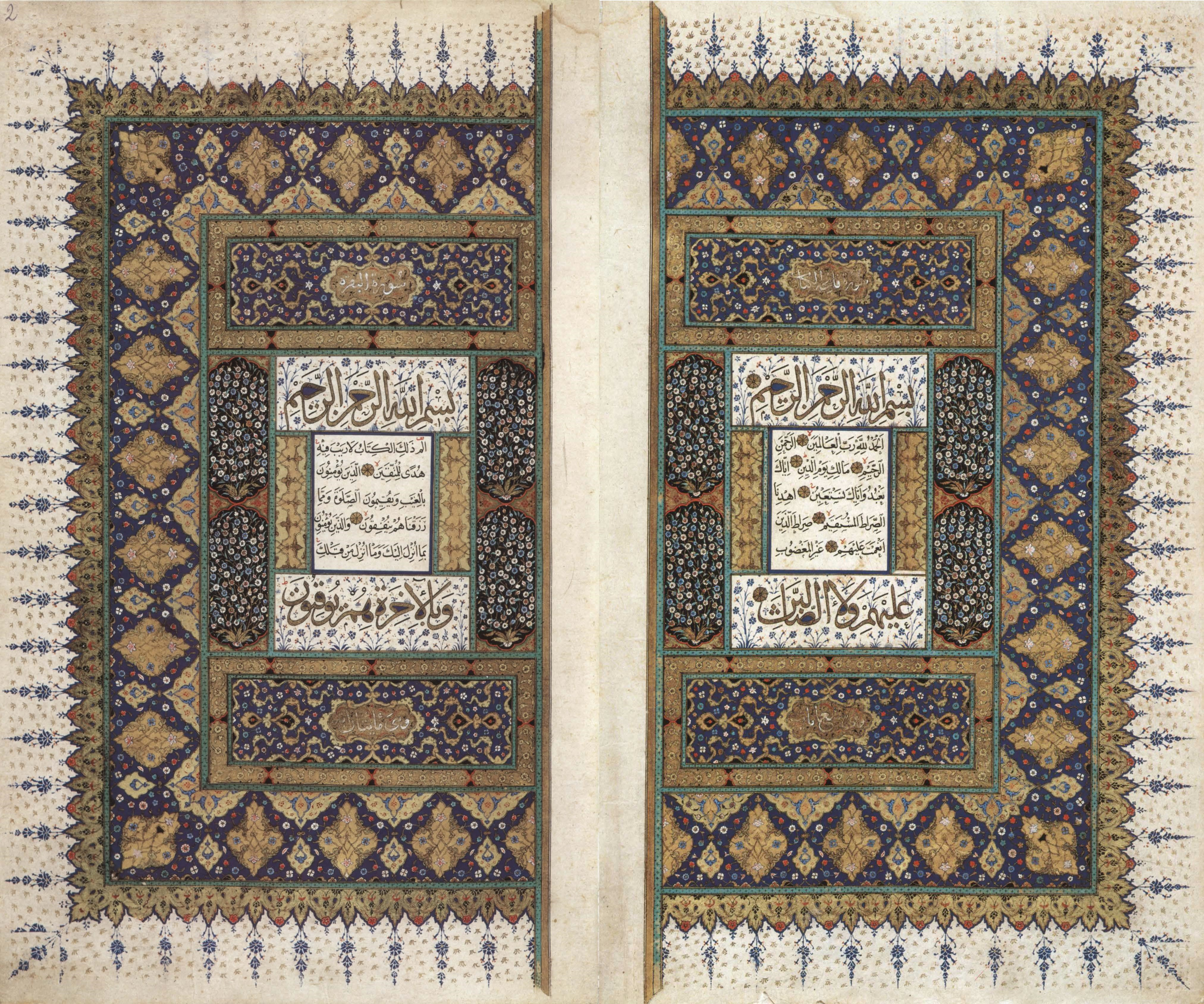
Opening pages from a Qur'an manuscript transcribed by Ahmed Karahisari and illuminated by Kara Memi. Istanbul, 1546/47. Topkapi Palace Museum

Ahmed Karahisari (1468–1566) (Turkish: Ahmed Şemseddin Karahisârî) (Ottoman Turkish: احمد شمس الدين قره حصاری) was an Ottoman calligrapher.

Born, Ahmed Şemseddîn’dir, he became known as Karahisari after his place of birth, Karahisar. His date of birth is uncertain but is around 1468 or 1469. Very little is known about his early life. In the early Bayezid era, he went to Istanbul for his education and remained there for the rest of his life.

After completing his Sufi scholarship, he took the chanting order. His calligraphy master is unclear. Müstakimzâde states that his teacher was Yahyâ Sufî, but Karahisari, in his own writings, always referred to Esadullah-ı Kirmânî as his teacher.

He served in the Imperial Court of Suleyman I, according to the Salary Books, which place him there in 1545, but his period of tenure is uncertain.

Unlike most of the Ottoman calligraphers of his era, he did not follow the style of Sheikh Hamdullah. Instead, he wanted to reinvigorate the style of the Abbasid calligrapher, Yaqut al-Musta'simi (1221–98), which had dominated Islamic calligraphy prior to Hamdullah's innovations. Karahisari improved the best examples of Thuluth and Naskh scripts. However, apart from his students, his style was not widely accepted and was largely overshadowed by the developments made by Sheikh Hamdullah (1436–1520) and Hâfiz Osman (1642–1698).

In terms of the technique and innovations made to the calligraphy, he is considered one of the three most important Ottoman calligraphers along with Sheikh Hamdullah and Hâfiz Osman. Among the followers of Karahisari's style, his student, Hasan Çelebi, was renowned as much as himself. Çelebi (also known as Cerkes Hasan Qelebi, d. 1594), was Karahisari's adoptive son. The boy had been a Circassian slave, and was in Karahisari's service when Karahisari freed him, adopted him and taught him calligraphy.

Some of the most impressive of the Mus'hafs prepared in the Ottoman Palace Studios have been attributed to Ahmed Karahisari. His most important work is the Mus'haf which he penned for Suleiman the Magnificent (reigned 1520-1566), which is preserved today at the Topkapi Palace. Other examples of his work are held in the Topkapi Museum and the Museum of Istanbul.

He died in Istanbul when he was well into his 90s, and was buried in the grave of Cemaleddin İshak Karamânî in Sütlüce. His epitaph was written by his adoptive son, Hasan Çelebi.

== Gallery ==
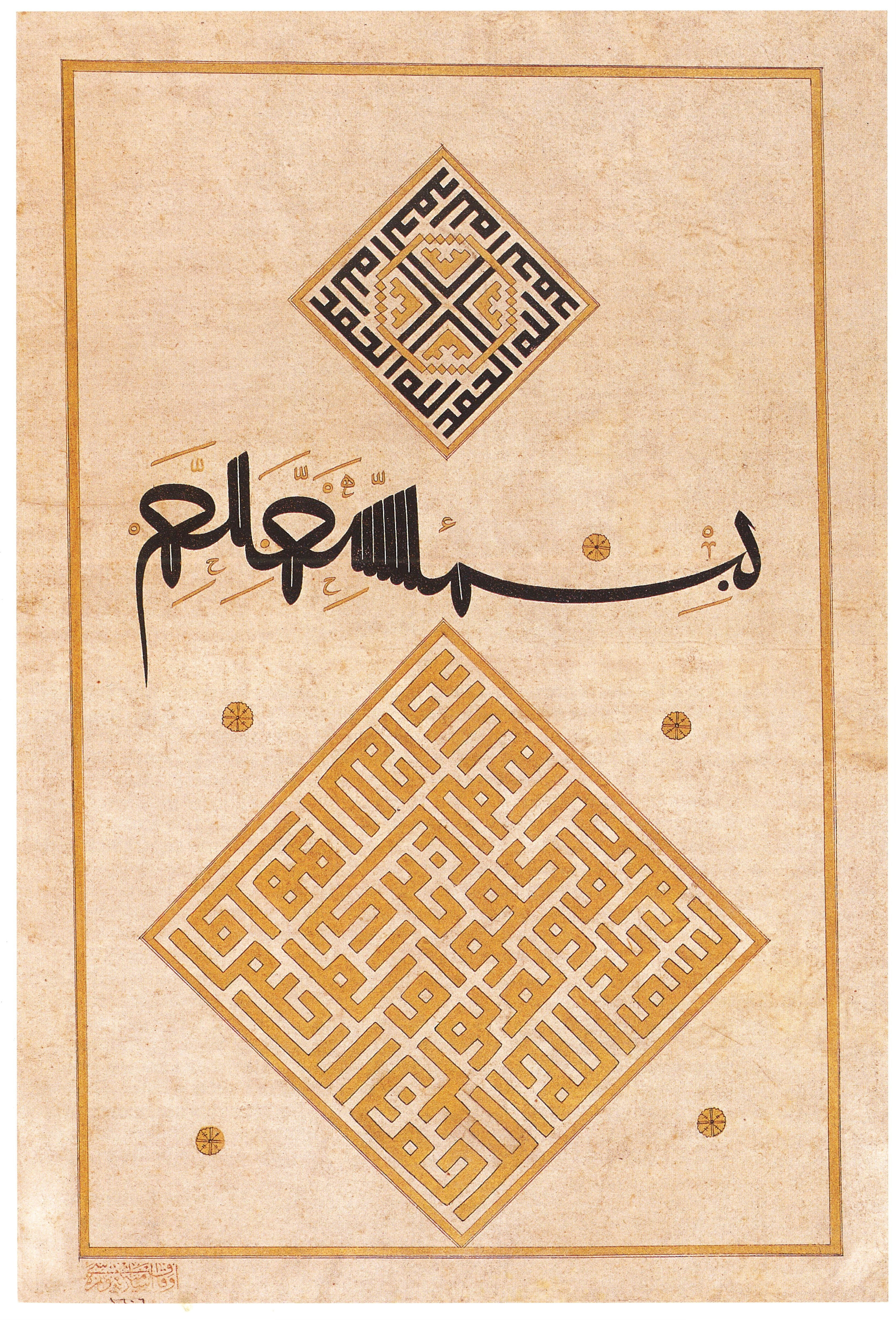
Right part of a double-page frontispiece to a manuscript of religious texts, penned for Süleyman I. c. 1550. Turkish and Islamic Arts Museum

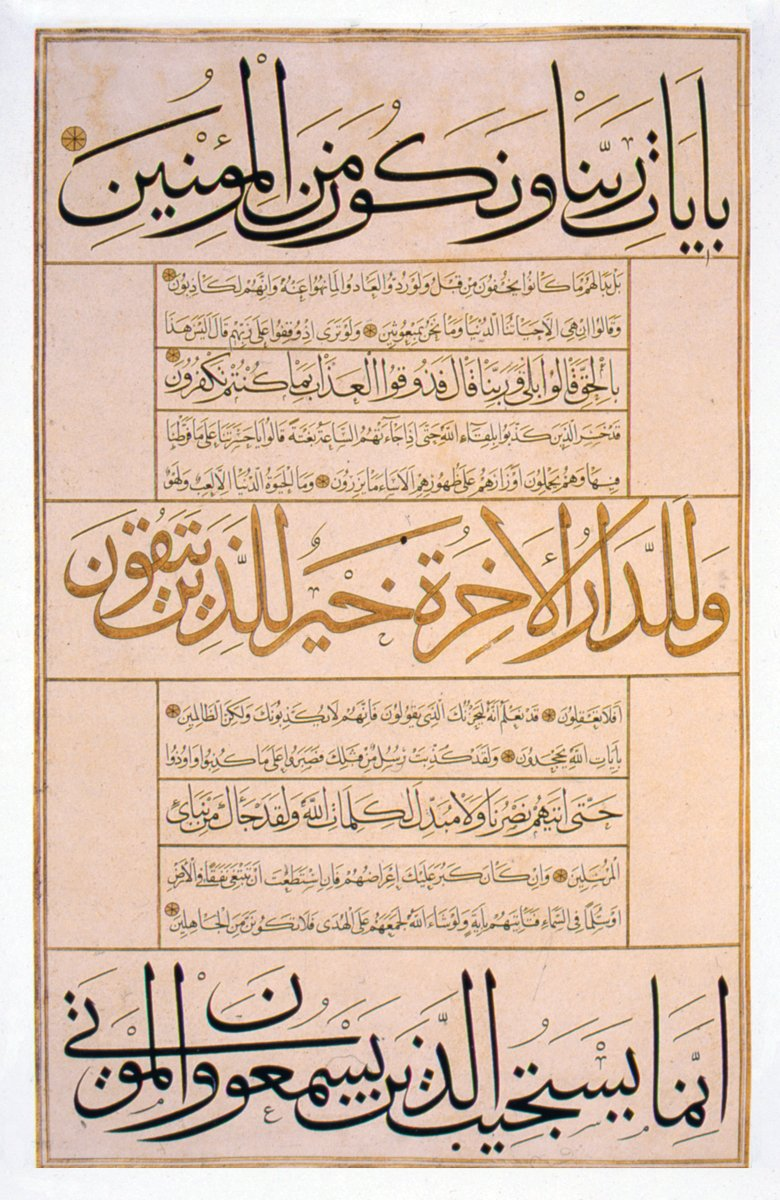
Sura Al-An'am written in Muhaqqaq, Thuluth and Naskh, 16th century. Turkish and Islamic Arts Museum

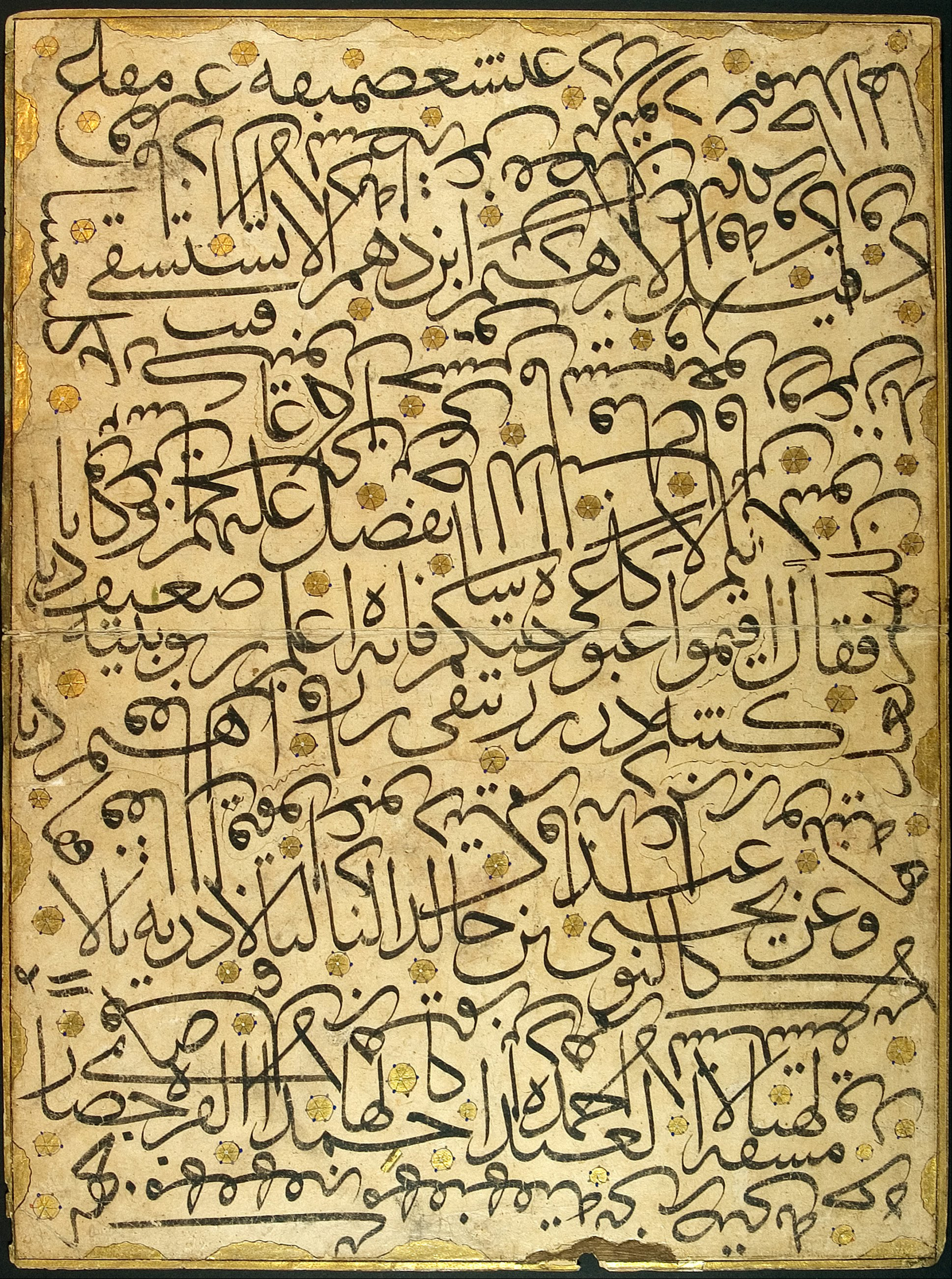
Karalama (calligraphy exercise), ink and gold on paper, 16th-century. Sakıp Sabancı Museum

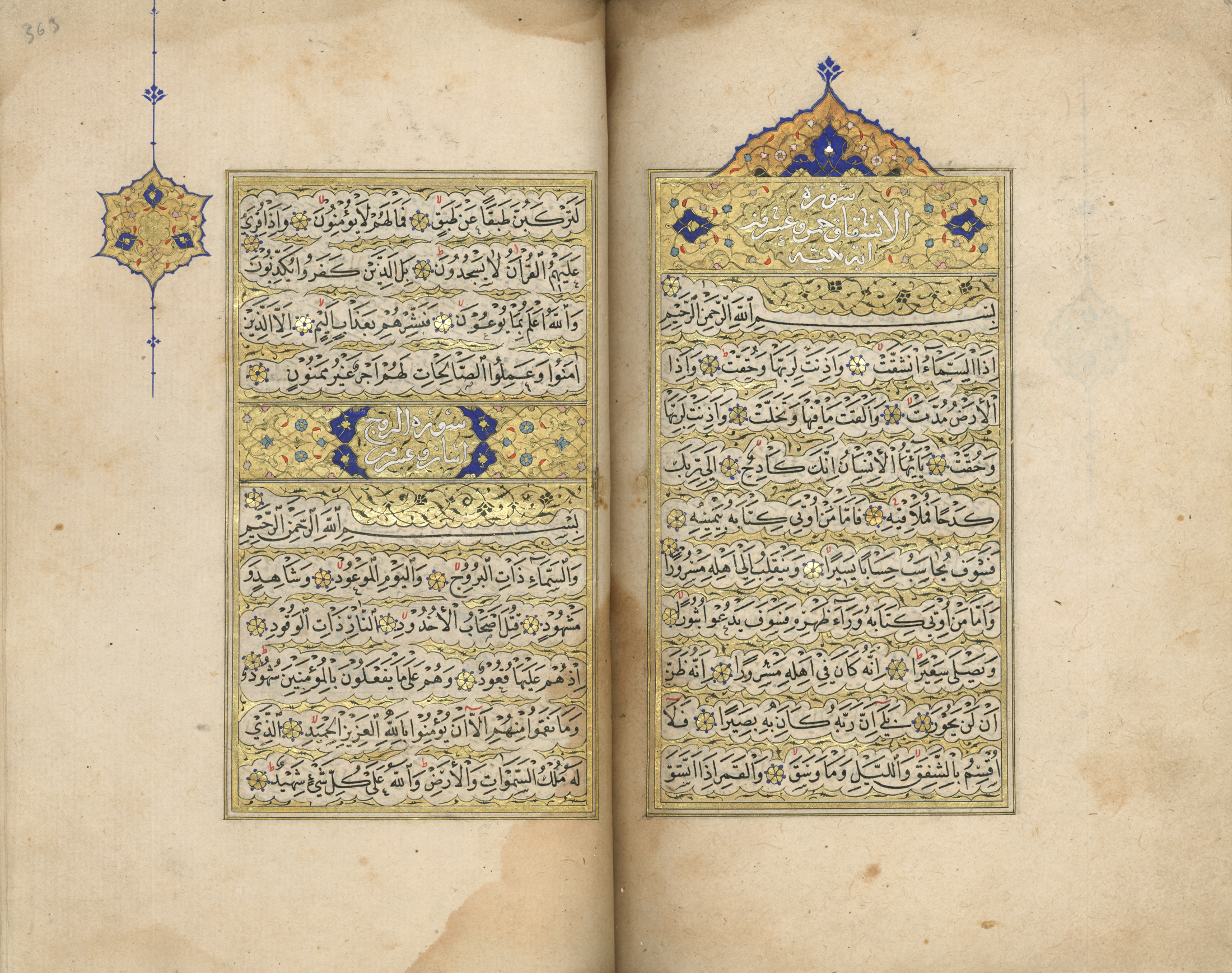
A single-volume Quran, circa 1550-60, Istanbul, Turkey. Khalili Collection of Islamic Art

== See also ==
- Culture of the Ottoman Empire
- Islamic calligraphy
- List of Ottoman calligraphers
- Ottoman art
