= Abdul Rahman Hilmi =

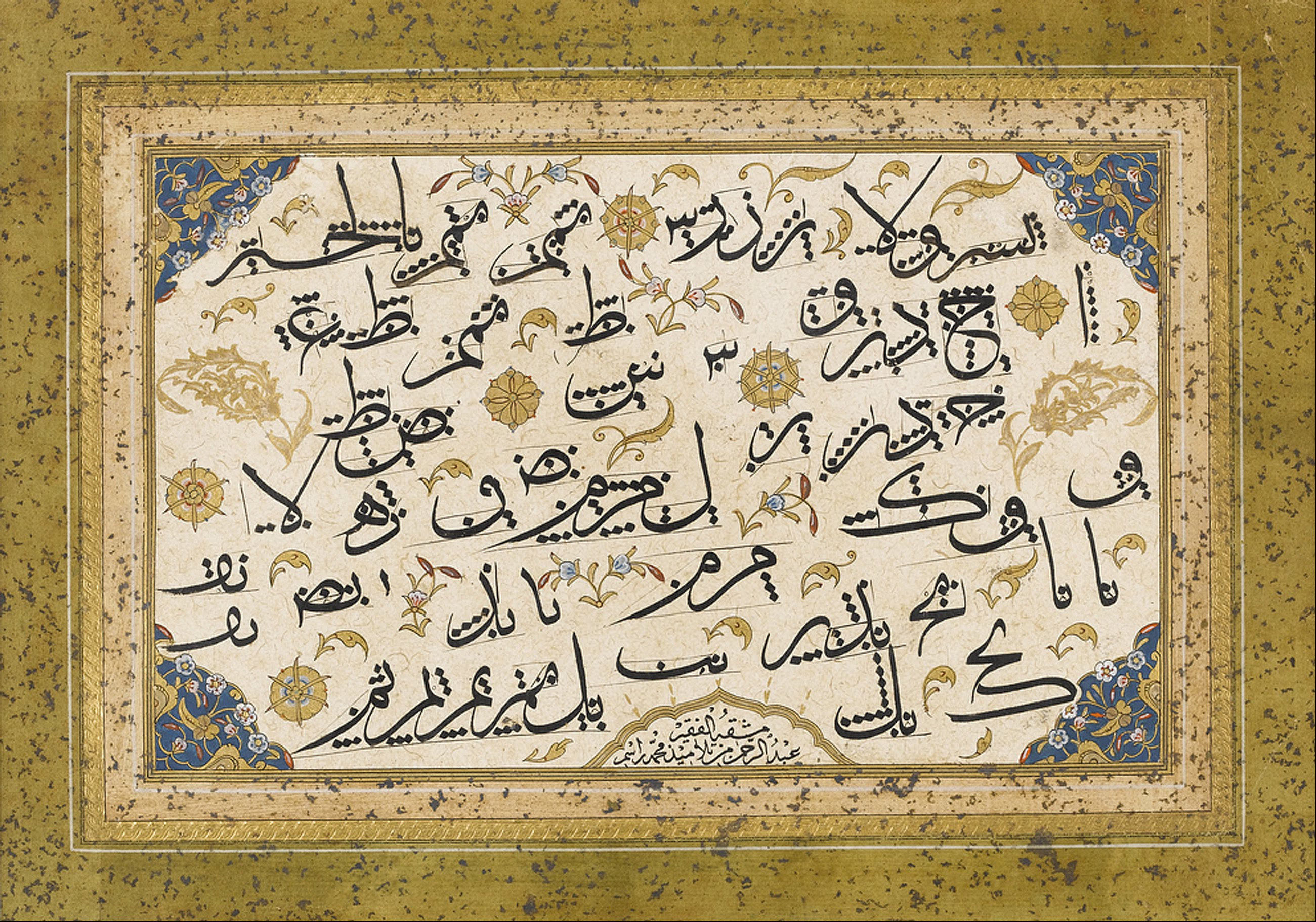
Meşk (calligraphy exercise). Ink, colours and gold on paper. Sakıp Sabancı Museum

Abdul Rahman Hilmi (died 1805) was a calligrapher from the Ottoman Empire.

== Life and career ==
Abdul Rahman Hilmi was pupil of Egrikapili Mehmed Rasim Efendi. He was an adroit calligrapher, known for the firmness of his writing. He spent most of life in Hagia Sophia school in Istanbul studying calligraphy and training students.

Hilmi was remembered as a very moral and praiseworthy person. He died in 1220/1805 and was buried in Scutari, in the vicinity of another great calligrapher, Sheikh Hamdullah.

== See also ==
- Calligraphy
- Culture of the Ottoman Empire
- Islamic calligraphy
- List of Ottoman calligraphers
- Ottoman art
