= Derviş Ali =

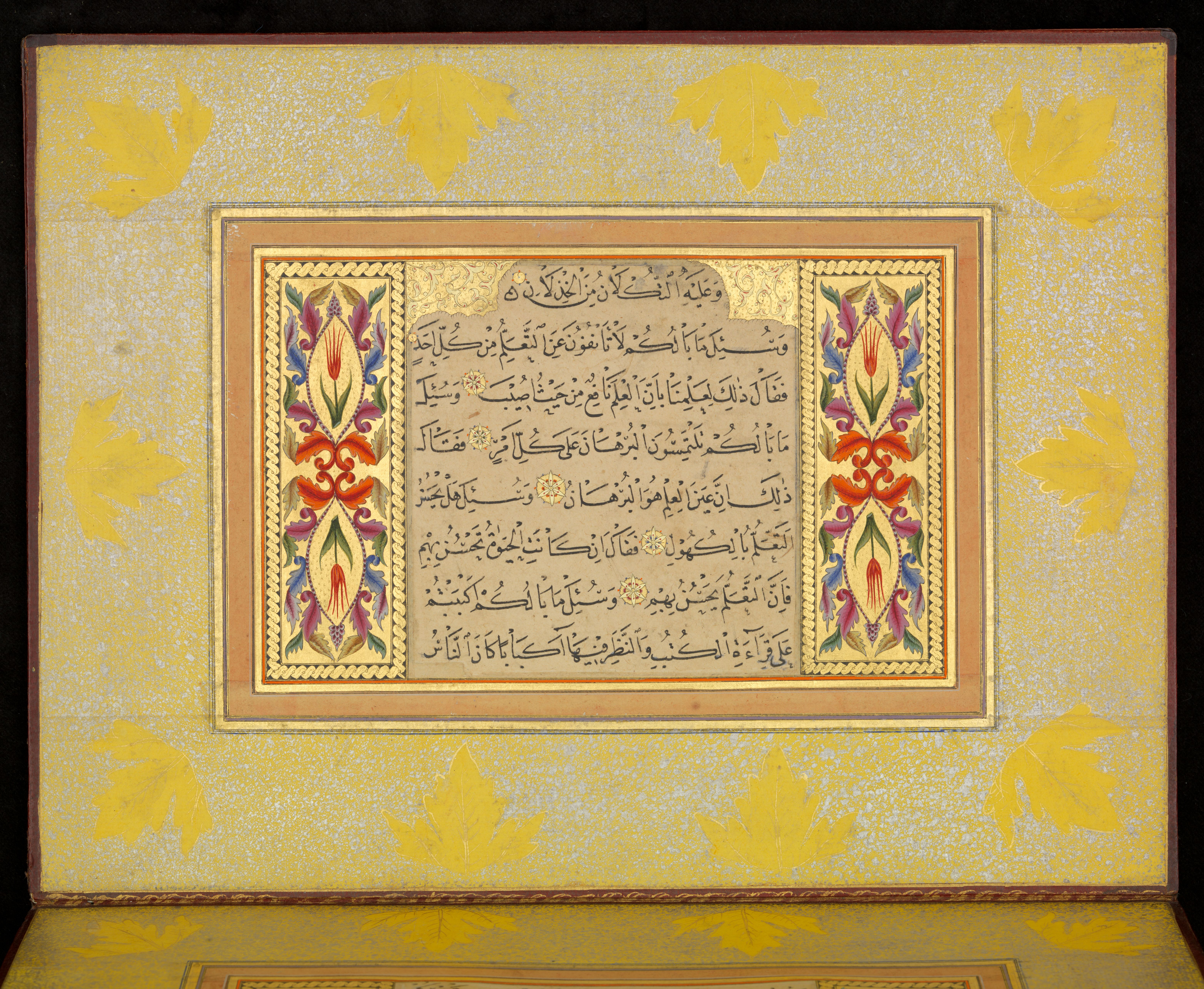
Album leaf with a calligraphic composition by Derviş Ali. Chester Beatty Library

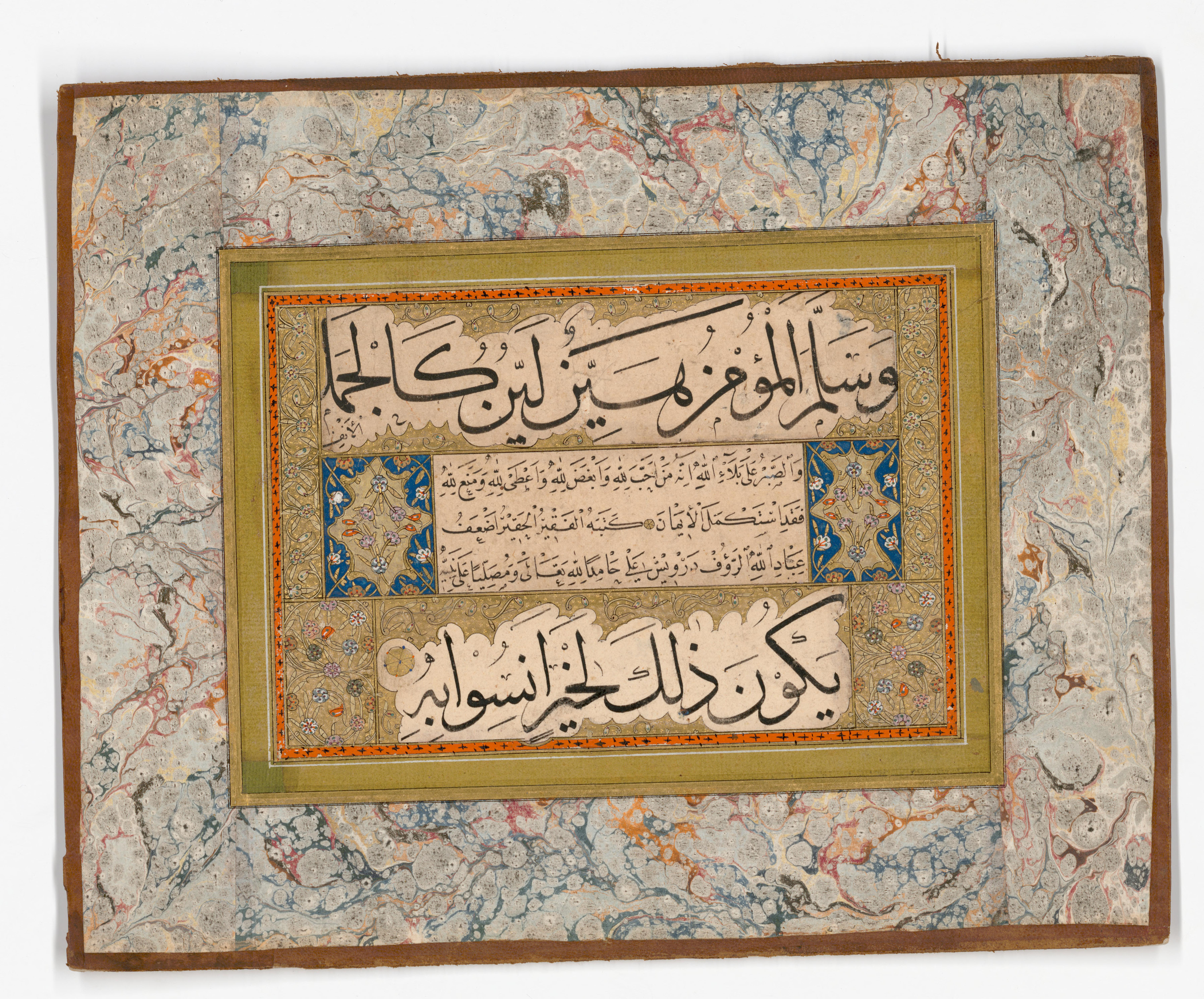
Calligraphic work with a hadith. McGill University Library

Derviş Ali (Ottoman Turkish: دروش على Modern Turkish: Derviş Ali) (d. 1673) was a 17th-century Ottoman calligrapher.

== Life and work ==
His is known as Derviş Ali, the elder or by the nicknames Büyük, Birinci or ayırt Mâruf (to distinguish him from the two different calligraphers of the same name, who lived at a later time).

Very little is known about his early life. His date of birth is unknown. He was raised as a slave in the household of a Janissary officer by the name of Kara Hasan-oglu Huseyn Aga. As a young man, he served as a subaltern with the Janissaries. He later trained as a calligrapher with Halid Erzurumi (d. 1651).

He worked in the Köprülü Library, where he trained many calligraphers, of whom the most famous were the Grand Vizier, Köprülüzade Fazıl Ahmed Pasha, Hâfiz Osman and Suyolcuzade Mustafa Eyyubi Another of his students was Ismail Efendi, who executed the tomb of Hâfiz Osman and also produced 44 copies of the Q'ran.

He died at an advanced age in 1673, and was buried outside Topkapı (ancient gate of Saint-Romain).

== See also ==
- Culture of the Ottoman Empire
- Hafiz Osman
- Islamic calligraphy
- List of Ottoman calligraphers
- Ottoman art
