= Mustafa Halim Özyazıcı =

Ottoman calligrapher

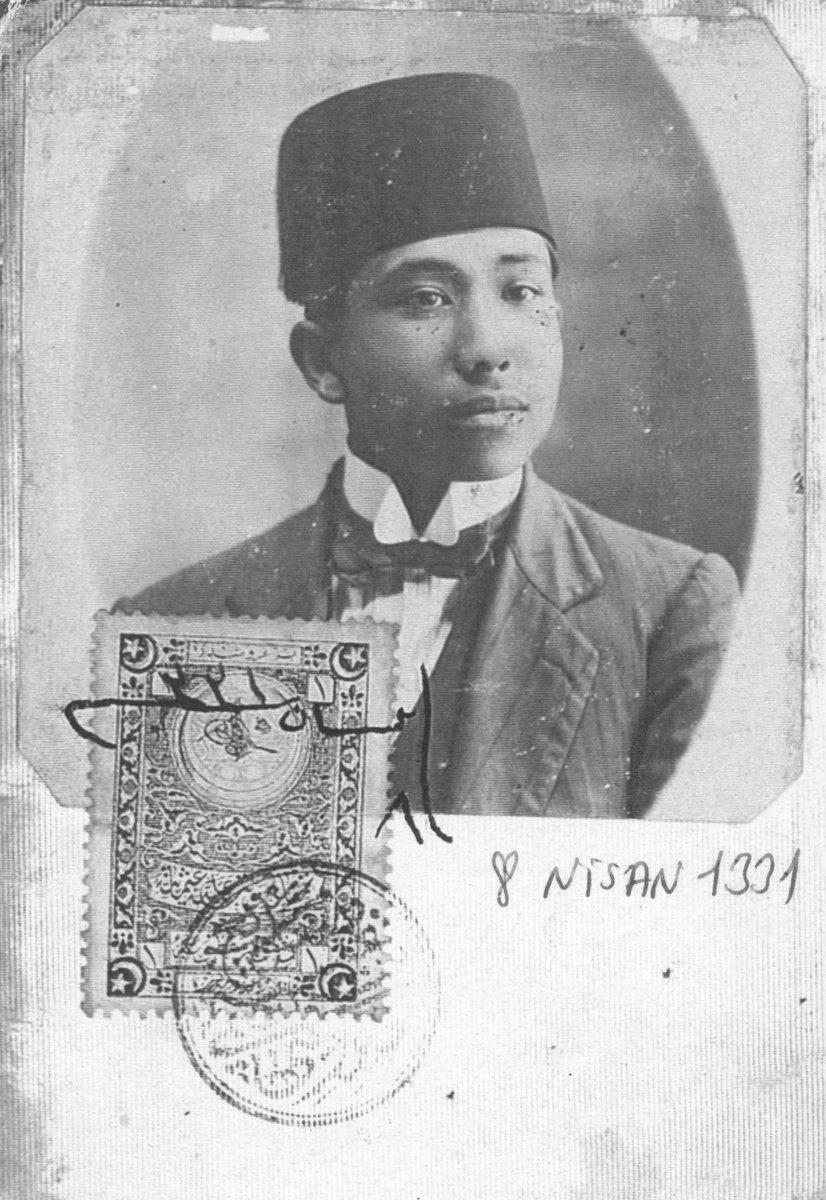
- Mustafa Halim Özyazıci (1898-1964), aged about 20 years
- Born: 14 January 1898; Istanbul
- Died: 30 September 1964 (aged 66)
- Occupation: calligrapher

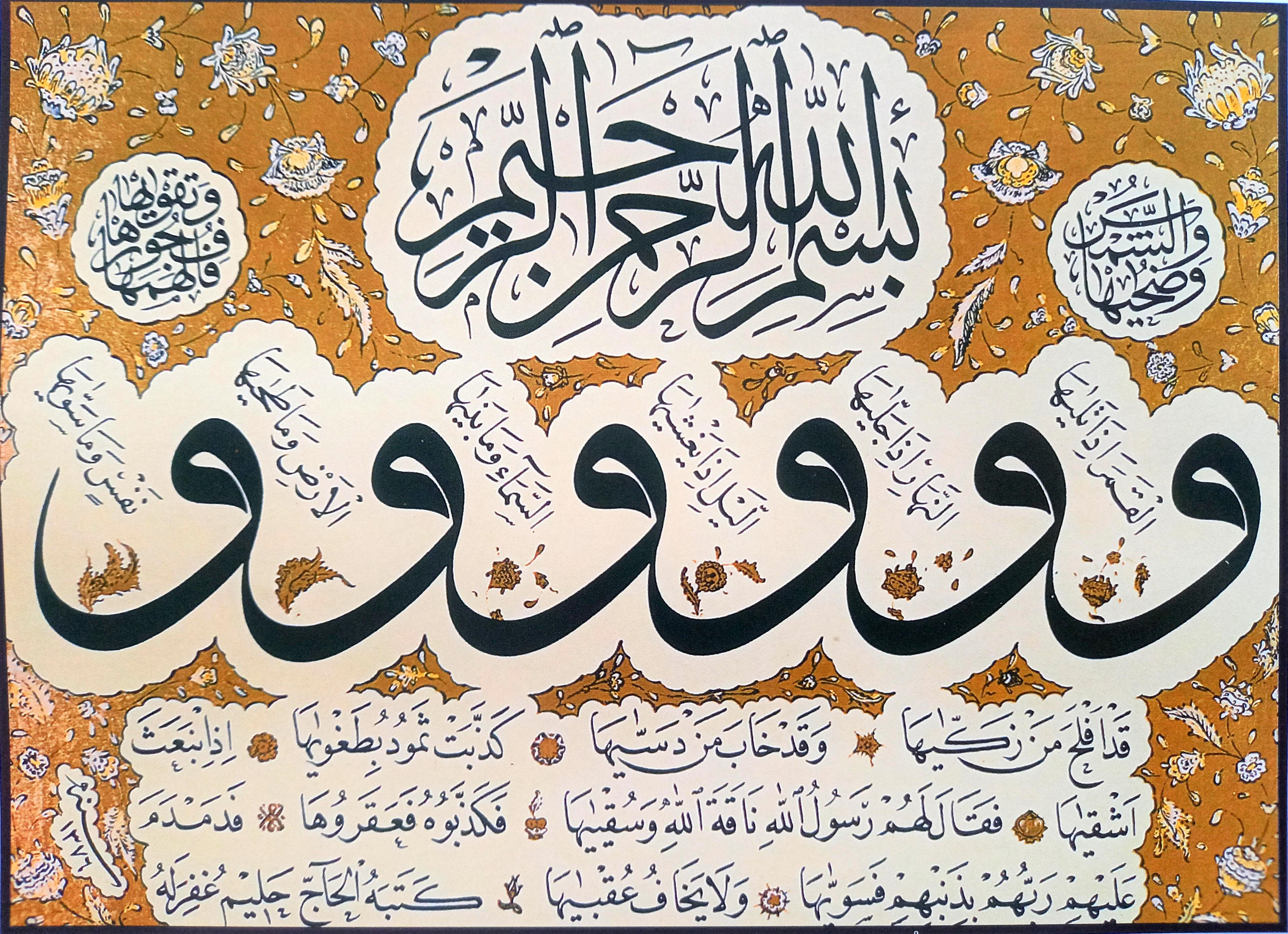
Sura Ash-Shams in the calligraphic composition by Mustafa Halim Özyazıcı

Mustafa Halim Özyazıcı (14 January 1898 - 30 September 1964) was an Ottoman calligrapher and one of the last of the classic Ottoman calligraphers, using the Arabic script. He was a versatile calligrapher with a high level of expertise in many styles of script, but was widely regarded as a master Jeli Thuluth. He is most noted for his work on various restoration projects, of both manuscripts and public buildings.

== Life and career ==
Mustafa Halim Ozyazici was born Mustafa Abdülhalim on 14 January 1898 in the Hazeki district of Istanbul. He was the son of Nalıncı Hacı Cemâl Efendi, a Crimean born-man (of Tatar descent) and his mother was Sudanese.

He was educated at Gülsen Junior High School, where he was given lessons in calligraphy by Hamid Aytaç, who recognised his talent and encouraged him to pursue calligraphy as a career. He later studied drawing and sculpture at the Academy of Fine Arts in Istanbul. His formal calligraphy studies were with Hasan Riza Effendi (1849-1920) and Kamil Akdik (1862-1941) where he mastered the sülüs, nesih and rikā scripts.

In 1916, he was drafted into the Army. After completing basic training he worked in the Military Printing Department and also worked in Evkāf-ı İslâmiyye Printing Press. Following his discharge from the Army in 1924, he opened an office in Bâbıâli Street where he prepared all types of calligraphy; business cards, seals and book covers. He also taught in various schools around the Cağaloğlu district of Istanbul.

From 1927, he was employed in the Imperial Chancery. When the Latin alphabet replaced Arabic lettering in 1928, he applied to go to Egypt, where classical calligraphy, using Arabic script, was still valued, but his application was rejected in 1929. He subsequently abandoned calligraphy altogether.

However, during the 1940s, his skills in classical calligraphy found an outlet when he became part of a major restoration project which worked on repairs to numerous manuscripts in a variety of styles and the restoration of calligraphic reliefs and monumental art in historic, public buildings, including many mosques. In 1948, he was appointed to the position of 'old writing teacher' at the Academy of Fine Arts in Istanbul; a position he retained until his retirement in 1963. One of his responsibilities was to write the diplomas for those who were about to graduate from the academy.

He died on 30 September 1964, ten days after being involved in a traffic accident. He was buried in the Kozlu Cemetery.

== Work ==
Although he developed expertise in many different types of script, he was regarded as a master of celi-sulus script. He wrote a number of exercise books for students to practice scripts in nesih, sulus-nesih, rik'a, dı̂vânı̂ and celı̂ dı̂vâni, and which were part of a program designed to promote the art of calligraphy. These books are still being printed and distributed to students of calligraphy.

== Legacy ==
He is the subject of a book by M. Uğur Derman entitled, Hattat Mustafa Halim Özyazıcı (1898-1964) published in 1964.

== See also ==
- Culture of the Ottoman Empire
- Islamic calligraphy
- List of Ottoman calligraphers
- Ottoman art
