= Hattat Aziz Efendi =

Ottoman calligrapher (1871–1934)

- Born: 1871; Maçka, Ottoman Empire
- Died: August 16, 1934 (aged 62–63); Istanbul, Turkey
- Known for: Calligraphy

Hattat Aziz Efendi (Ottoman Turkish: خطاط عزیز افندی; 1871 – August 16, 1934) was an Ottoman later Turkish calligrapher.

== Life and work ==
Born Mehmed Abdulaziz Efendi, in Maçka in 1871, his family moved to Istanbul, the Ottoman capital during Russo-Turkish War (1877–78). Aziz Efendi completed his primary education in 1885 and started to learn calligraphy from Ahmed Arif Effendi of Plovdiv (known more commonly as "Bakkal" -the grocer-) and he also studied at Hat Mektebi (Calligraphy School). He graduated in 1894 and continued to practise under the supervision of Muhsinzade Abdullah Hamdi Efendi until 1896.

In 1921, King Fuad of Egypt invited him to Cairo, where he transcribed the Quran and gilded the result. After completing his mission, he remained in Egypt, where he worked as a teacher and contributed to the establishment of schools to improve Arabic fonts.

He returned to Istanbul in 1932, where he died two years later on August 16, 1934.

Two of his calligraphic panels are hanging in the Grand Mosque of Bursa, Turkey. He transcribed 11 copies of the Quran in his lifetime, a number of hilyas and other textual compilations.

== Examples of works ==
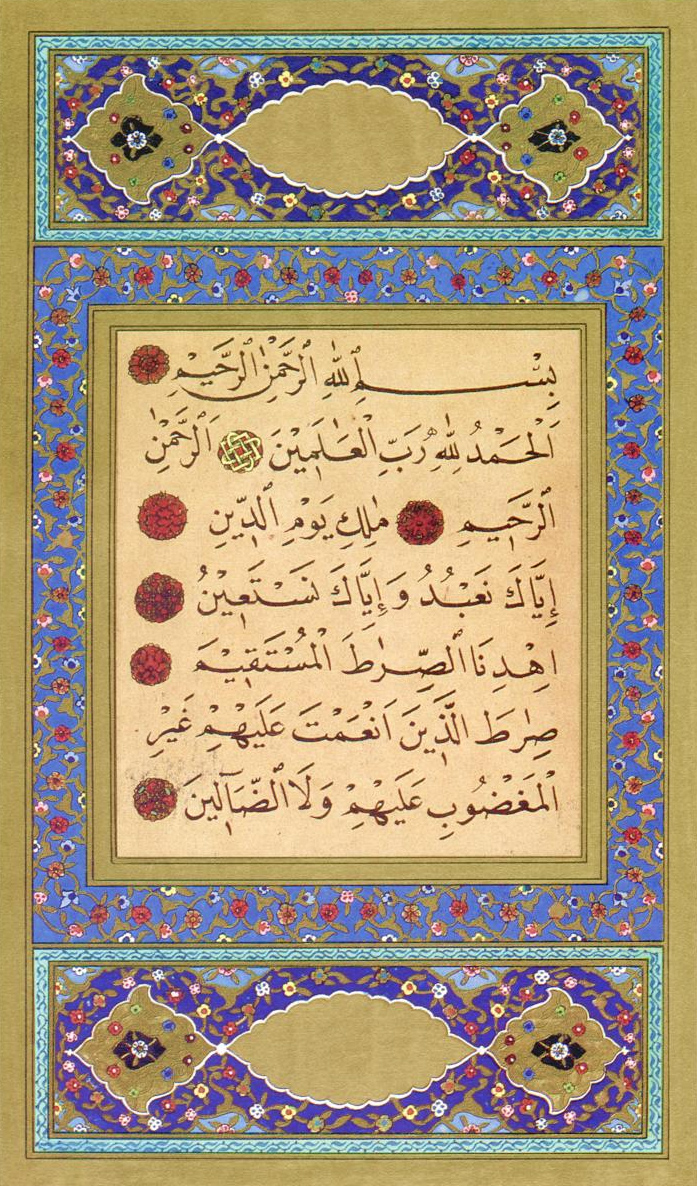
The first sura of the Qur'an, al-Fatihah, in the hand of Hattat Aziz Efendi

The name "Muhammad" in traditional Thuluth calligraphy, possibly inspired by a 19th-century disk in the Hagia Sophia

== See also ==
- Culture of the Ottoman Empire
- Islamic calligraphy
- List of Ottoman calligraphers
- Ottoman art
