= Sami Efendi =

Ottoman calligrapher

- Born: Mehmed Sami; 13 March 1838; Ottoman Empire
- Died: 1912 (aged 73–74); Istanbul, Ottoman Empire
- Known for: Calligraphy
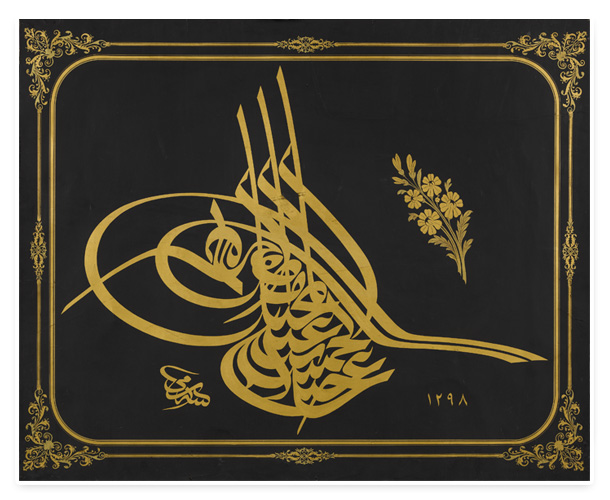
- Notable work: Imperial tughra of Sultan Abdulhamid II. It reads: Abdul Hamid Khan bin Abdul Majid, al-muzaffar daima. Dated 1298/1881, Istanbul.

Sami Efendi (Ottoman Turkish: سامى افندي, Modern Turkish: Hattat Mehmet Sâmi Efendi) (1858-1912), was an Ottoman calligrapher.

== Life and work ==
He was born Mehmed Sami on 13 March 1838 in Haydarhâne district of Fatih in Istanbul. His father was Mehmed Efendi, an official of the Quilt-makers Guild and his mother was Nefise Hanim.

He studied calligraphy with Kibriszade Ismail Hakki Efendi and Haydar Bey (182-1870). He was also student of Sheikh Sadik Efendi, who had learned his art in 19th-century Bukhara and his students, including Sami, helped to carry it into the 20th century. He was inspired by the work of Mustafa Raq'im (1757 - 1826)

He also learned the art of paper making and the art of marbling paper by studying with Edhem Efendi.

His personal style was most evident with Celî. These plates were generally written on black paper with yellow colored ink, or sometimes with gold. Sami designed the most attractive designs for vowell signs, refined many aids to reading and also developed the tezînyat (decorations) and numbers. These techniques are still in use in modern calligraphy. The Tughra (monogram) found its "definitive shape" with Sami Efendi during the era of Abdulhamid II.

For many years, he taught at the Topkapi Palace. His students included many calligraphers who went on to have notable careers including: Nazif Bey, Huhiso Efendi, Puza Efendi, Okyay Necmeddin and Kâmil Akdik.

Following the proclamation of the Constitutional monarchy, he retired. He was paralyzed in his final years and died 1 July 1912. He was buried in the Hazrat Mosque Mosque. His former student, Hacı Kâmil Efendi (Akdik) wrote his epigraph with celî sülüs.

His work adorns fountains, mosques and gravestones in Istanbul.

== See also ==
- Culture of the Ottoman Empire
- Islamic calligraphy
- List of Ottoman calligraphers
- Ottoman art
- Thuluth
