= Yedikuleli Seyyid 'Abdullah Efendi =

Ottoman calligrapher

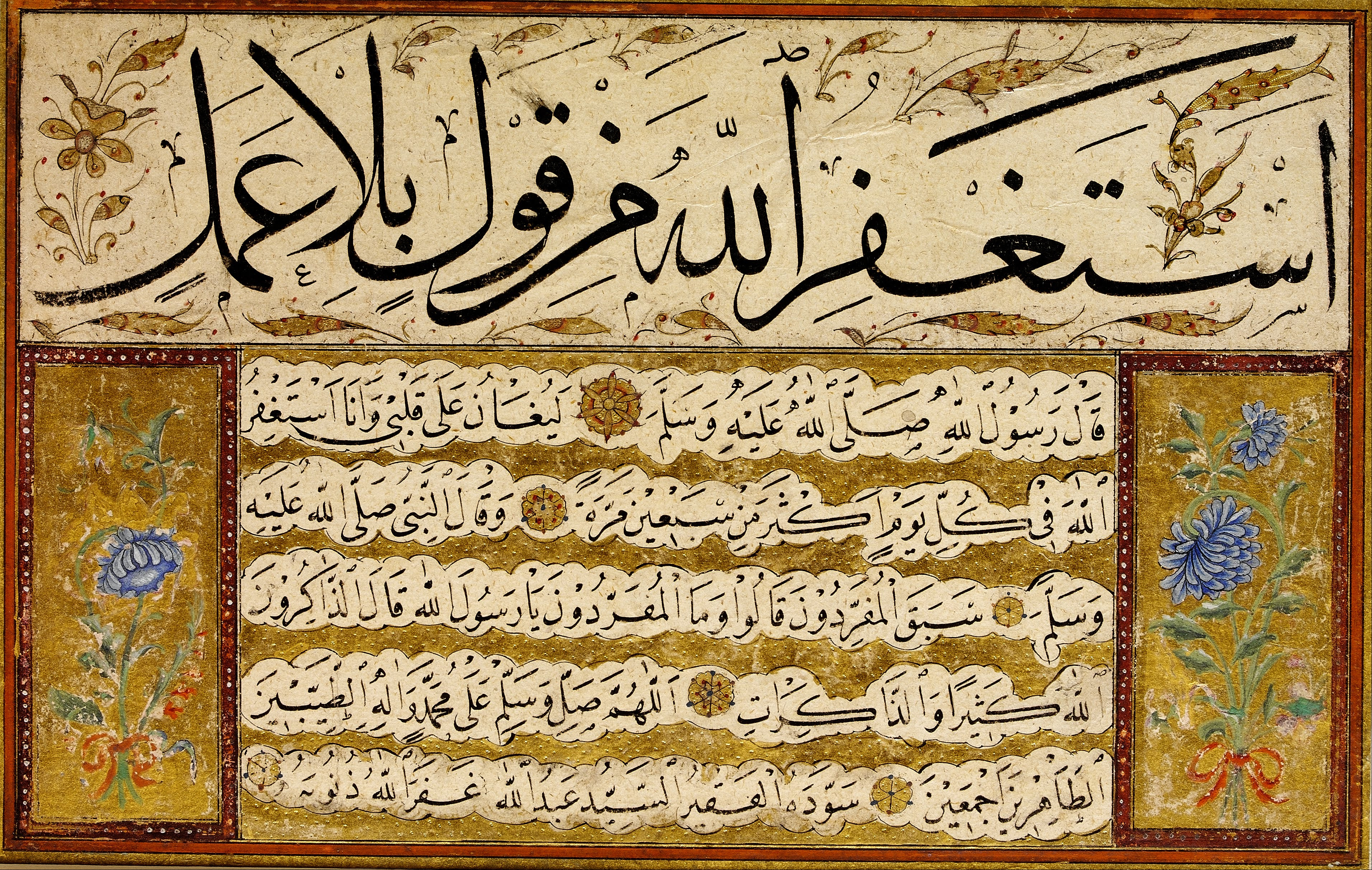
Kıt'a (single piece) by Yedikuleli Seyyid Abdullah Efendi

Yedikuleli Seyyid Abdullah Efendi (Ottoman Turkish: يدى قللى سيد عبد الله Modern Turkish: Yedikuleli Seyyid Abdullah Efendi) (1670-1731) was an Ottoman master calligrapher.

== Life and career ==
Born Hâşimîzâde Abdullah Efendi in 1670 in Istanbul, his father was Sayyid Hassan al-Hashimite, the imam of Imrahor Mosque. He was born into a family of calligraphers and grew up in the 'Yedikuleli' district from which he derived the nickname. He was descended from the prophet, Mohammed through both his paternal and maternal line, which allowed him to use the title of Seyyid. He studied calligraphy with the great master, Hâfiz Osman.

He became a court calligrapher and was a favourite of Sultan Ahmed III. He was appointed as the instructor of calligraphy at the Topkapi Palace in 1708, where he taught Egrikapili Mehmed Rasim Efendi. He wrote many copies of the Qur'an.

At one point Ahmed III was so intrigued by the ink that Seyyid used in his calligraphy, that he sent a messenger to learn the secret. Seyyid sent back a full inkwell with the messenger. When the Sultan received the gift, he reportedly emptied the ink, refilled the inkwell with gold, and sent it back.

== See also ==
- Culture of the Ottoman Empire
- Islamic calligraphy
- List of Ottoman calligraphers
- Ottoman art
