= List of Ottoman calligraphers =

The following is an incomplete list of Ottoman calligraphers:

== 15th–16th century ==
- Ahmed Karahisari
- Sheikh Hamdullah
- Kahdi Mahmud Efendi (d. 1575)
- Ahmed Pasa (d. 1611) son of Kahdi Mahmud Efendi
- Mustafa Ali (d. 1600)
- Yûsuf Efendi (d. 1611)
- Abdullah Amâsi- 16th-century calligrapher
- Ahmed Şemseddin Karahisarî (d. 963/1556)
- Gâbârî Adurrahman (d. 974/1566)
- Rizâî Mahmud Baba Efendi (d. 987/1579)
- Mustafa Dede – son of Sheikh Hamdullah (d. 945/1538)
- Tâcîzâde Ca'fer Çelebi (1452–1515) poet, calligrapher and scholar

== 17th–18th century ==
- Hâfiz Osman
- Seyyid Kasim Gubari
- Ibrahim Vahdi (d. 1714)
- Ibrahim Afif (d. 1767)
- Egrikapili Mehmed Rasim Efendi
- İsmail Zühdi Efendi
- Mehmed Esad Yesari
- Mehmed Rasim (1687–1755)
- Mustafa Kutahi (d. after 1785)
- Musa al-'Abidi
- Yesarizade Mustafa Izzet Efendi
- Derviş Ali
- Veliyyüddin Efendi
- Mehmed Refi Efendi (d. 1769)
- Abdul Rahman Hilmi (d. 1805)
- Yedikuleli Seyyid 'Abdullah Efendi (d. 1731)
- Suyolcuzade Mustafa Eyyubi (1619–1686)
- Mahmud Celaleddin Efendi (c. 1750–1829)
- Esmâ Ibret Hanim (b. 1780) wife of Mahmud Celâleddin Efendi
- Halid Erzurumi (d. 1651)
- Dede Mehmed Efendi (d. 1734)
- Şâbanzâde Mehmed Efendi(d. 1120/1708)
- Dede Mehmed Efendi (d. 1147/1734)
- Adülbâkî -i Tebrîzî (d. 1039/1629-30)
- Kâtibzâde Mehmed Refî (d. 1183/1769)
- Hasan Üsküdârî (d. 1023/1614)
- Hüseyin Hablî (d. 1157/1744)
- İbrâhim Rodosî (d. 1201/1787)
- Eski İsmâil Zühdü (d. 1144/1731)
- Eğrikapılı Mehmed Râsim (d. 1169/1756)
- Ramazan b. İsmâil رمضان بن إسماعيل (d. 1091/1680)
- Tophâneli Mahmued Nûri,(d. 1080/1669)

== 19th–20th century ==
- Ali Alparslan (1925–2006)
- Şefik Bey (Mehmed Şefik, 1819–1880)
- Abdullah Zuhudi Effendi (1835–1879)
- Muhsinzade Abdullah Bey (1832–1899)
- Hasan Çelebi (b. 1937)
- Hasan Riza Effendi (1849–1920)
- Kazasker Mustafa Izzet Efendi
- Mehmed Şevkî Efendi (1829–1887)
- Mehmet Şefik (1818–1890)
- Mehmed Sami Efendi (1838–1912)
- Hattat Aziz Efendi
- Mustafa Râkim
- Kayışzâde Hâfız Osman Efendi
- Hulusi Yazgan
- Necmeddîn Okyay (Necmeddîn Üsküdari Efendi, 1883–1976) tr:Necmeddin Okyay
- Bakkal Arif Efendi
- Kâmil Akdik
- Neyzen Emîn Efendi
- Halîm Özyazıcı (1898–1964)
- Bekir Pektin (b. 1913)
- Hamid Aytaç
- Ismail Hakkı Altunbezer (1873–1946)
- Mustafa Râkim (Mustafa Raq'im, 1757–1826)
- Çömez Mustafa Vasif (d. 1853)
- Hafız Hasan Tahsin Hilmi Efendi (1847–1912)
- Mustafa Halim Özyazici (alternate spelling: Oyazici) (1898–1964)
- Mustafa Uğur Derman (b. 1935)
- Hafız Mehmed Fehmi Efendi (1860–1915)
- Abdülkadir Şürki Efendi 19th-century calligrapher
- Şeref Adkik (1899–1972)
- Şeyh Ali Bedevî (1868–1943)
- Şeref Akdik (1899–1972)
- Hasan Rizâ Efendi (d. 1890)
- Esad Muhis Paşa (1780–1850)
- Mehmed Hâşim Efendi (d. 1845)
- Mehmed Nazif Bey (1846–1913)
- Kebecizâde Mehmed Vasfi, (d. 1831)
- Çemşîr Hâfız Sâlîh Efendi, (d. 1236/1820–21)
- Laz Ömer Efendi (d. 1240/1825)
- Mehmed Şevket Vahdetî (1833–1871)

== See also ==
- List of Persian calligraphers
- List of Georgian calligraphers
