= Suyolcuzade Mustafa Eyyubi =

Ottoman calligrapher

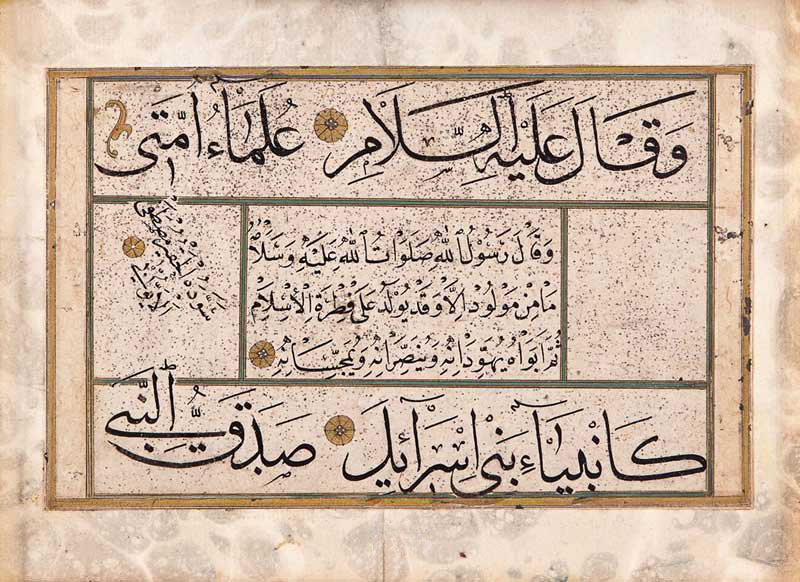
An undated kit'a with one line written in Thuluth and two lines in Naskh

Suyolcuzade Mustafa Eyyubi (1619?, Istanbul - 1686) was a 17th-century Ottoman calligrapher.

== Life and work ==
Suyolcuzade Mustafa Eyyubi was born in the Eyiib district of Istanbul in around 1619. He was the son of Suyolcu Ömer Ağa.

Initially, he studied calligraphy with Dede, who was very elderly at the time, and known as the "grandfather". Following the master's death, Eyyubi studied with Derviş Ali.

Some of his best known students are Cabizade Abdullah, Hâfiz Osman and Hocazade Mehmed.

Few of his works have survived. From about fifty Qur'an and 100 An'am-i Sharif written by him, just a few are available today. He also produced 100 en'am and various qit'at. Some of the surviving works are held in the Topkapi Collection.

He died in 1686 in and was buried in the Kabristani in the Hamamarkası at Eyüp, but the location of his tomb is not known. The grave inscriptions were written by his grandson, Suyolcuzâde Mehmed Necib (d. 1757), who was also a calligrapher. His grandson, Suyolcuzâde Mehmed Necib, wrote the Devḥatü l-küttāb, [translated as Genealogy of the Scribes or the Great Tree of Penmen] a compilation of biographies of famous calligraphers.

== See also ==
- Culture of the Ottoman Empire
- Islamic art
- List of Ottoman calligraphers
- Ottoman art
