= Seyyid Kasim Gubari =

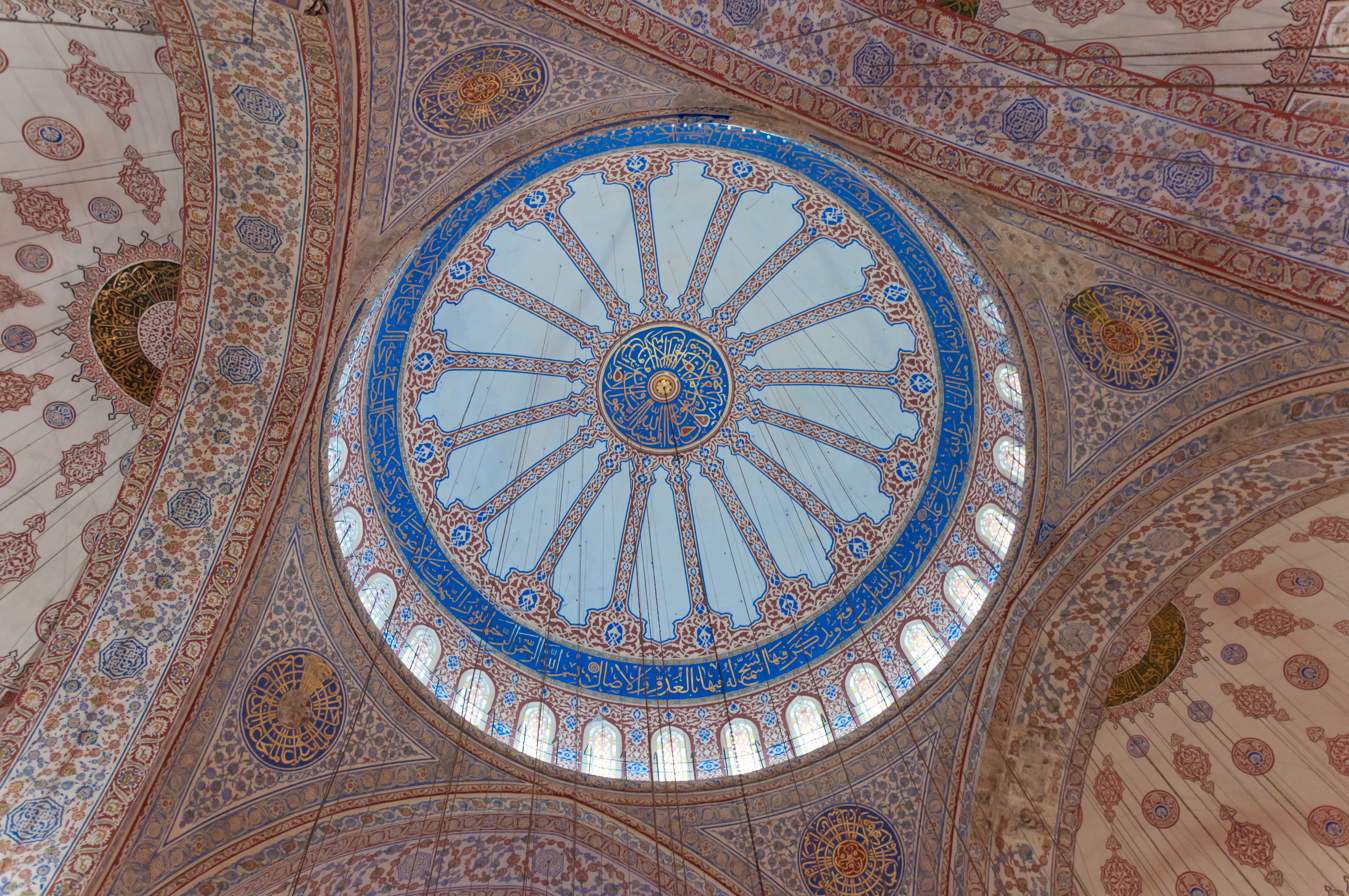
- Islamic calligraphy on the dome and interior of the Sultan Ahmed Mosque
- Born: Ottoman Empire
- Died: 1615/1616; Ottoman Empire
- Known for: Islamic calligraphy
- Movement: Thuluth and Naskh

Seyyid Kasim Gubari of Diyarbakır was a 17th-century Ottoman artist, noted for his poetic writing and calligraphy. He is celebrated as one of the most accomplished calligraphers of his time and decorated a number of important public buildings including the Blue Mosque in Istanbul.

== Life and work ==
Seyyid Kasim Gubari's date of birth is not known, but he lived in Diyarbakır in south-eastern (modern day) Turkey on the banks of the Tigris River. He was a direct descendant of the prophet, Mohammed which entitled him to use the appellation Seyyid. Born Cherif 'Abdallah, he was given the nickname of Gubari (or Ghobâri) because according to legend, he wrote, in ghobar writing, an entire chapter of the Q'ran, consisting of four verses and fifteen words, on a single grain of rice.

He was originally known for his poetic writing and took up calligraphy and decorative inscription sometime later. He responsible for much of the calligraphy in the dome of the Sultan Ahmed Mosque (the "Blue Mosque") in Istanbul. He was also commissioned to write verses from the Quran throughout the mosque. He was celebrated as one of the greatest calligraphers of his day.

He died in 1615/1616 and is buried near the tomb of Eyyub.

== See also ==
- Culture of the Ottoman Empire
- Islamic calligraphy
- List of Ottoman calligraphers
- Ottoman art
