= Mustafa Râkim =

19th century calligrapher

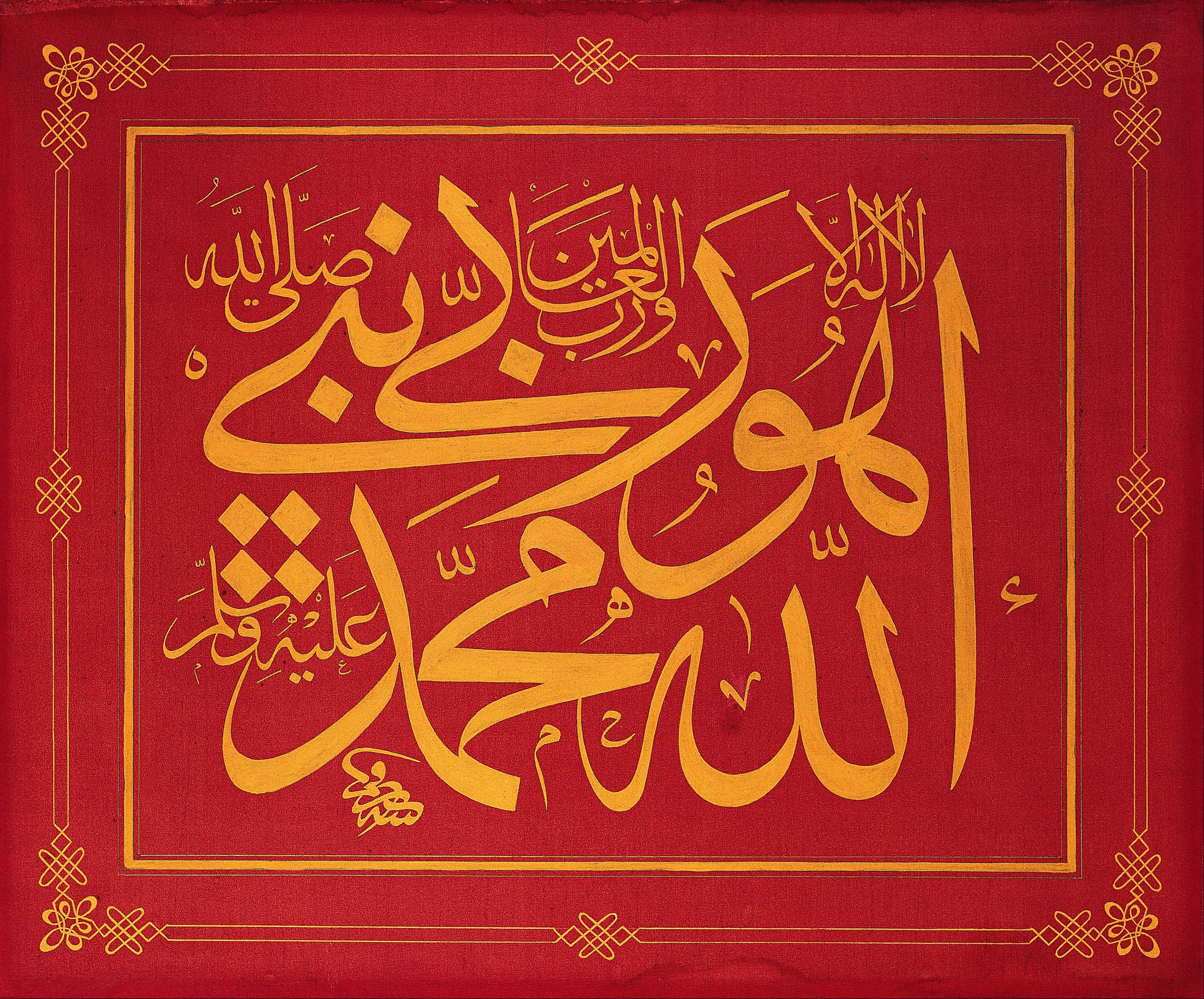
- Calligraphic panel written by Mustafa Rakim, late 18th - early 19th century
- Born: 1757
- Died: 1826 (aged 68–69)
- Known for: Islamic calligraphy
- Movement: Naskh (script), Thuluth

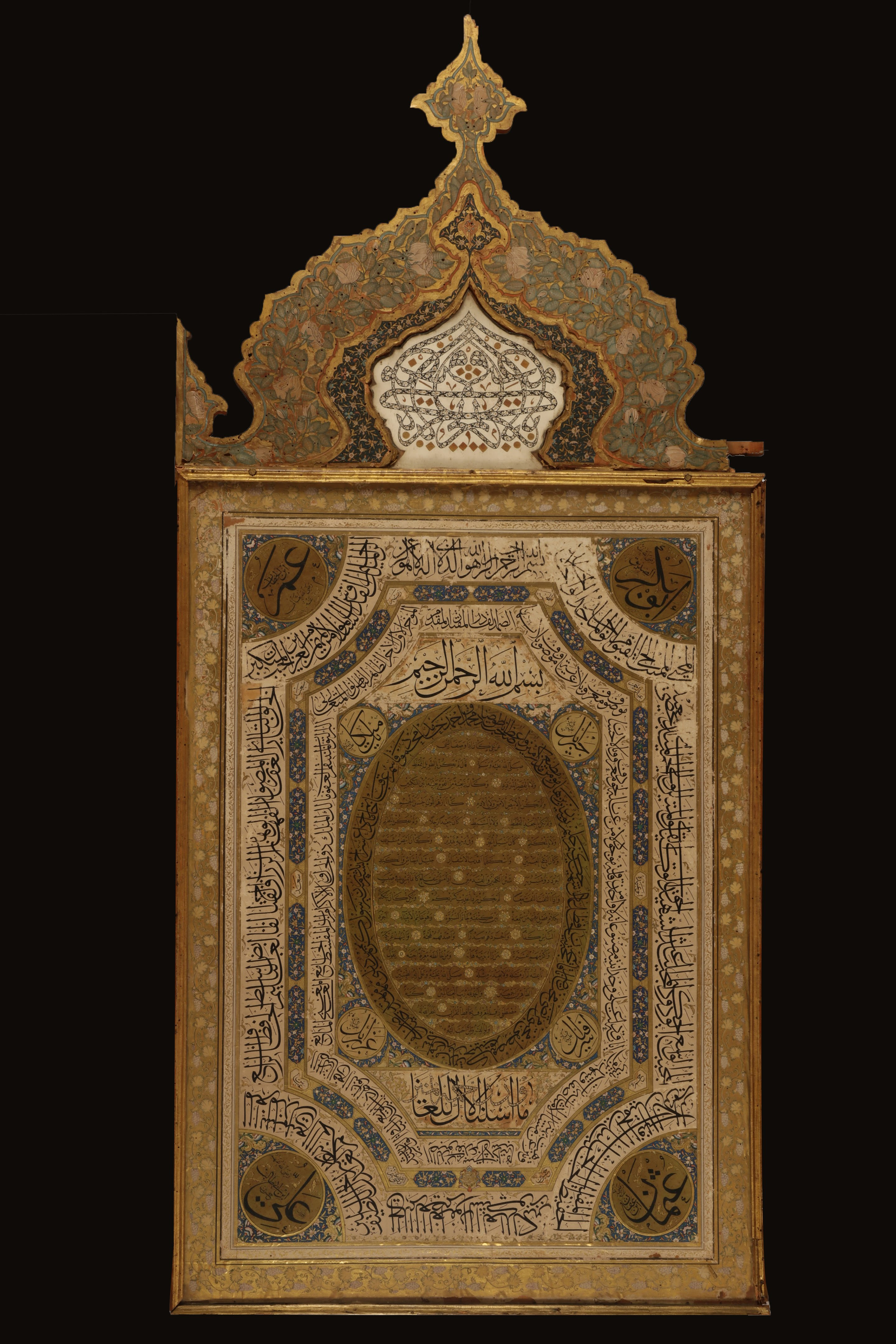
Hilye copied in 1791. Turkish and Islamic Arts Museum

Mustafa Râkim (Ottoman Turkish: مصطفى رآقم; Modern Turkish: Mustafa Râkım) (1757–1826), was an Ottoman calligrapher. He extended and reformed Hâfiz Osman's style, placing greater emphasis on technical perfection, which broadened the calligraphic art to encompass the Sülüs script as well as the Nesih script.

== Life and career ==
Mustafa Râkim was born in Ünye on the Black Sea in 1758. When he was very young, his father, Mehmed Kaptan, took him to Istanbul to live with his brother, İsmail Zühdi Efendi, who was an established calligrapher. After Ismail was appointed as an instructor of calligraphy at the Imperial Palace, the young Râkim received his formal training there studying under his brother. Mustafa Râkim would become Ismail Zühidi's most celebrated pupil.

Ismail Zühidi and Mustafa Râkim went on to develop their own style of calligraphy based on the work of Hâfiz Osman. They were able to develop a style of celî sülüs that was aesthetically pleasing, something that other calligraphers had not been able to do. Râkim also reformed the calligraphic shape of the tughra script.

With the revolutionary changes brought about in calligraphy by Mustafa Râkim, scholars treat Turkish calligraphic art history into two key eras: "Pre-Râkim" and "Post-Râkim". He was able to accomplish what nobody before him could in the Jali-Thuluth script and tughras of sultans. By finding the ideal measurement between the letter thickness and pen (writing tool) thickness, he established the style and form for the ideal beauty of tughras.

He is regarded as the first great Turkish painter in the Western sense of painting. His bird, parrot, painting is considered to be the first realist work of Turkish painting. He drew a portrait of Sultan Selim III who was amazed by his work and recited a poem in his honor in return.

== See also ==
- Culture of the Ottoman Empire
- Islamic calligraphy
- List of Ottoman calligraphers
- Ottoman art
