= Egrikapili Mehmed Rasim Efendi =

Ottoman calligrapher and poet

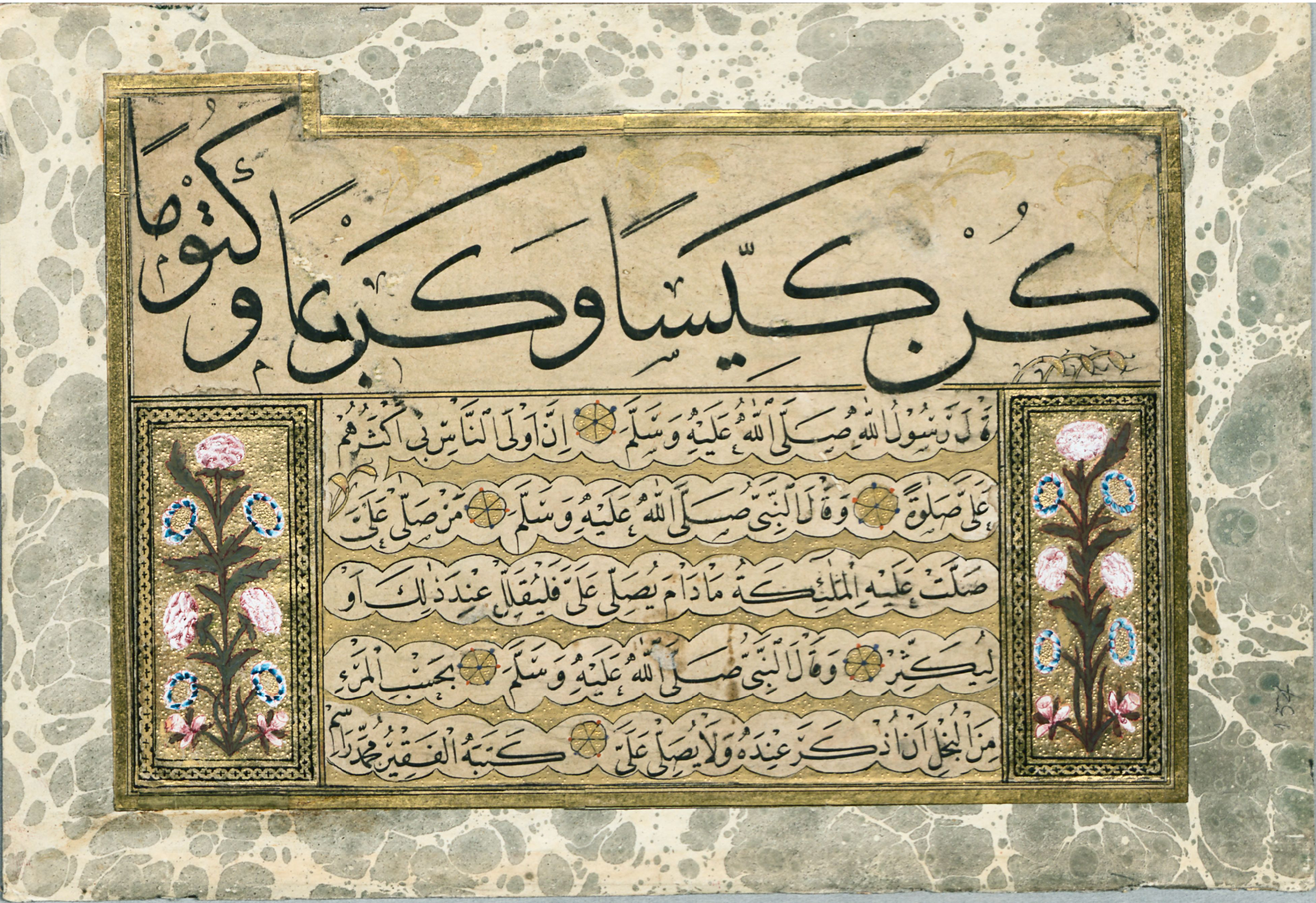
Kit'a (calligraphic specimen). Sakip Sabanci Museum

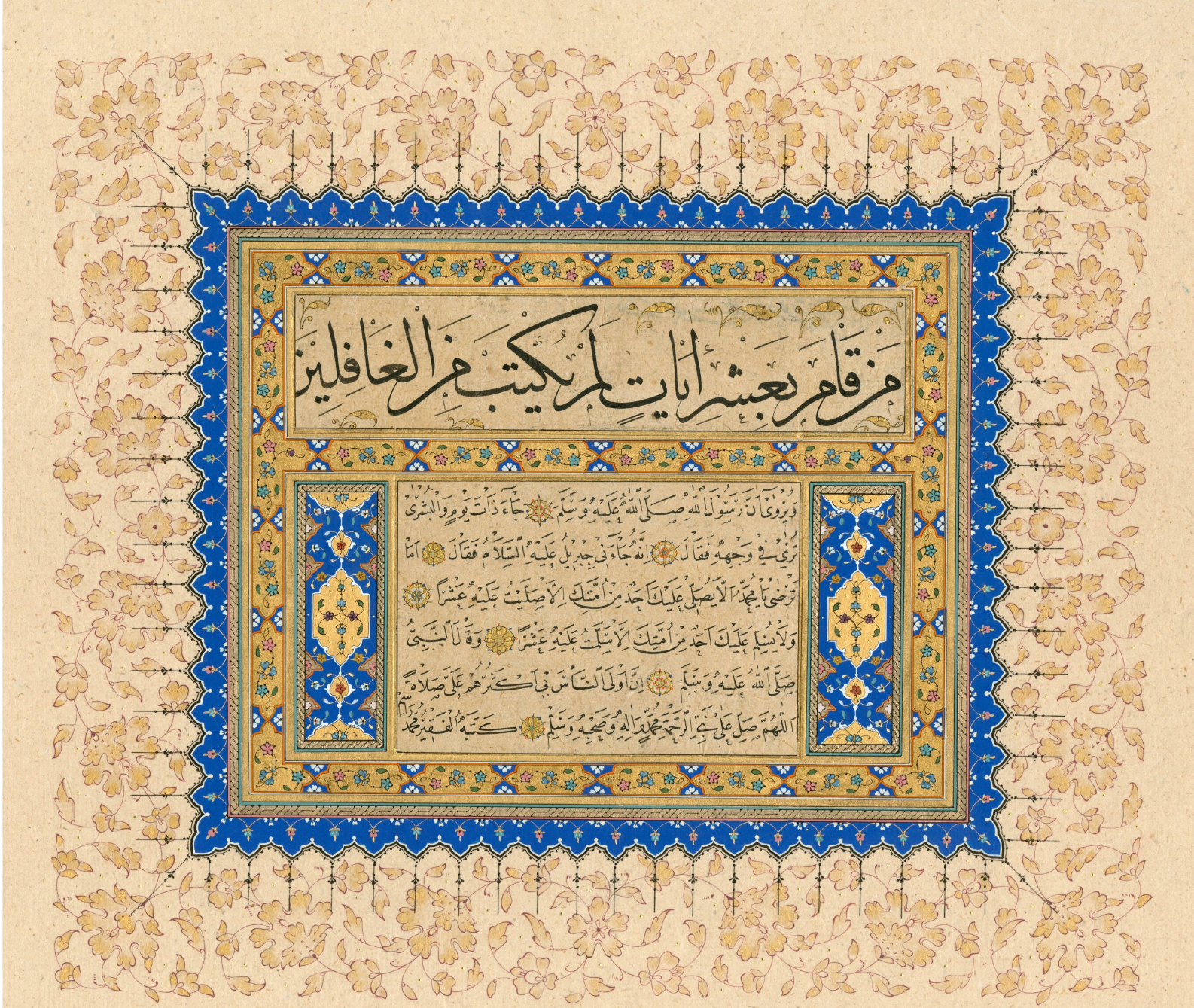
Calligraphic composition. Albayrak Hat collection

Egrikapili Mehmed Rasim Efendi (b. 1687-d. May 13, 1756) (Modern Turkish: Eğrikapılı Mehmed Râsim Efendi) was an Ottoman calligrapher and poet.

== Life and work ==
Born in the Eğrikapı district of Istanbul, he became known as Eğrikapılı after the place of his birth. His father, Yusuf Efendi (d.1729), was the imam of the Molla Aşkî Masjid and an accomplished calligrapher.

As a child, Eğrikapılı studied with his father, and later became a pupil of the court calligrapher, Yedikuleli Seyyid 'Abdullah Efendi. He received his ijazah (certificate) in 1705.

Mehmed Rasim gained a reputation for his work and became a major court calligrapher in the Tulip period during the reign of Sultan Ahmed III. He was appointed calligraphy teacher at the Galata palace in 1714 and later at the Topkapi Palace in 1737. He is noted for copying over 60 manuscripts of the Kuran as well as executing many inscriptions, including on the fountain of Saliha Sultan at Azap Kapi in Constantinople. He was also skilled at Paper marbling.

Rasim Mehmed was a well-educated man and he wrote poetry in three different languages.

He died of tuberculosis in 1169 (14 May 1756) and was buried in a church outside Eğrikapı. His student, Mestcizade Ahmed Efenci (d.1761) prepared his epitaph.

== See also ==
- Culture of the Ottoman Empire
- Islamic calligraphy
- List of Ottoman calligraphers
- Ottoman art
