= Sheikh Hamdullah =

Ottoman Islamic calligrapher (1436-1520)

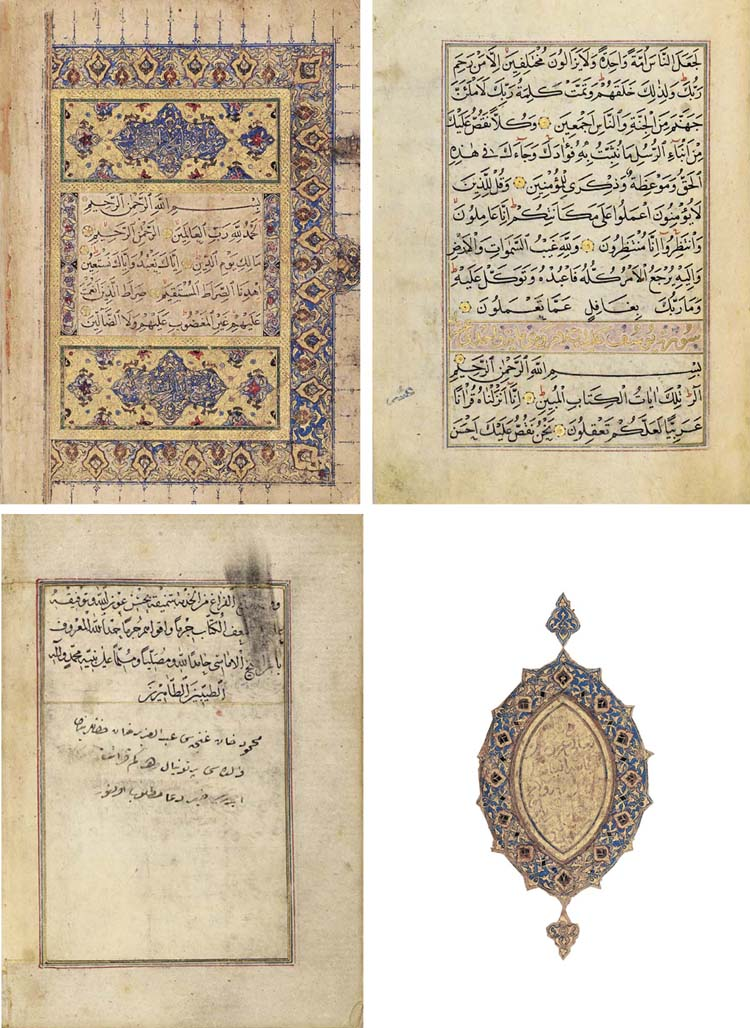
- Stills for a Qur'an copy in Naskh style script, by Şeyh Hamdullah
- Born: Hamdullah; 1436; Amasya, Ottoman Empire
- Died: 1520 (aged 83–84); Istanbul, Ottoman Empire
- Known for: Islamic calligraphy

Sheikh Hamdullah (1436–1520) (Turkish: Şeyh Hamdullah), born in Amasya, Ottoman Empire, was a master of Islamic calligraphy.

== Life and work ==
Sheikh Hamdullah was born in Amasya, a north-central town in Anatolia. His father, Mustafa Dede, was a Sheikh of the Suhrawardi order, and had migrated from Bukhara (in present-day Uzbekistan) to Anatolia.

In Amasya, he studied the six scripts under the tutelage of Hayreddin Mar'asi. He learned the traditional method of the old masters, but struggled to reproduce it. While studying, he met Bâyezïd, the son of Sultan Mehmed, the Conqueror who was a fellow student, and the pair became friends. When Bâyezïd assumed the throne in 1481, following his father's death, he invited his friend, Sheikh Hamdullah, to the capital, Istanbul. Hamdullah went on to become a master calligrapher at the Imperial Palace.

In 1485, Bâyezïd II acquired seven works by the great calligrapher, Yaqut al-Musta'simi. Bâyezïd then encouraged his court calligrapher, Hamdullah, to devise a new script, inspired by the acquisition. Hamdullah regarded al-Musta'simi's work as unsurpassable, but at Bâyezïd's insistence, Hamdullah reluctantly agreed. Scholars have suggested that Bâyezïd's enthusiasm for a new script was symbolic of his desire to establish a new empire and a new dynasty.

Hamdullah underwent a period of reclusion during which time he claimed that a prophet taught him the new scripts in a vision. He ultimately recodified and refined the naskh style of calligraphy, originally developed by Yaqut al-Musta'simi. Hamdullah's scripts were more elegant, balanced and legible. From 1500, the majority of Q'rans adopted Hamdallah's new style, which became known as the Ottoman style or "Seyh's manner'. For this, he is often considered to be the "father of Ottoman calligraphy". His many students spread his style throughout the Ottoman Empire. His style endured for 150 years, making him one of the greatest Ottoman calligraphers of all time. As much as two centuries later, students of calligraphy such as Hâfiz Osman continued to copy his works assiduously as part of their training.

He devoted his whole life to the art of calligraphy, continuing to produce works well into his 80s. He produced 47 Mus'hafs, book of Quran, and innumerable En'ams, Evrads and Juz', a number of which are held in the collection of the Topkapi Palace. His inscriptions also decorate the Bâyezïd, Firuzaga and Davud Mosques in Istanbul and the Bâyezïd Mosque in Erdine.

His son, Mawlana Dede Chalabi, became a calligrapher after studying with Hamdallah (his father) and Hamdallah's daughter, whose name is unknown, married a calligrapher by the name of Shukrullah Halife of Amasya, who had also been one of her father's pupils. Hamdullah's grandsons also became calligraphers; Pir Muhammad Dede (d. 986/1580, son of Hamdallah's daughter) and Dervish Muhammad (d. 888/1483, son of Mawlana Dede).

As his reputation grew, many myths to his abilities outside calligraphy sprang up. It was said that he was a great archer, falconer, swimmer and even an extraordinary tailor.

He died in Istanbul in 1520 and was buried at Karacaahmet Cemetery in the district of Üsküdar at Istanbul. Surviving examples of his works are held in the Topkapi Collection.

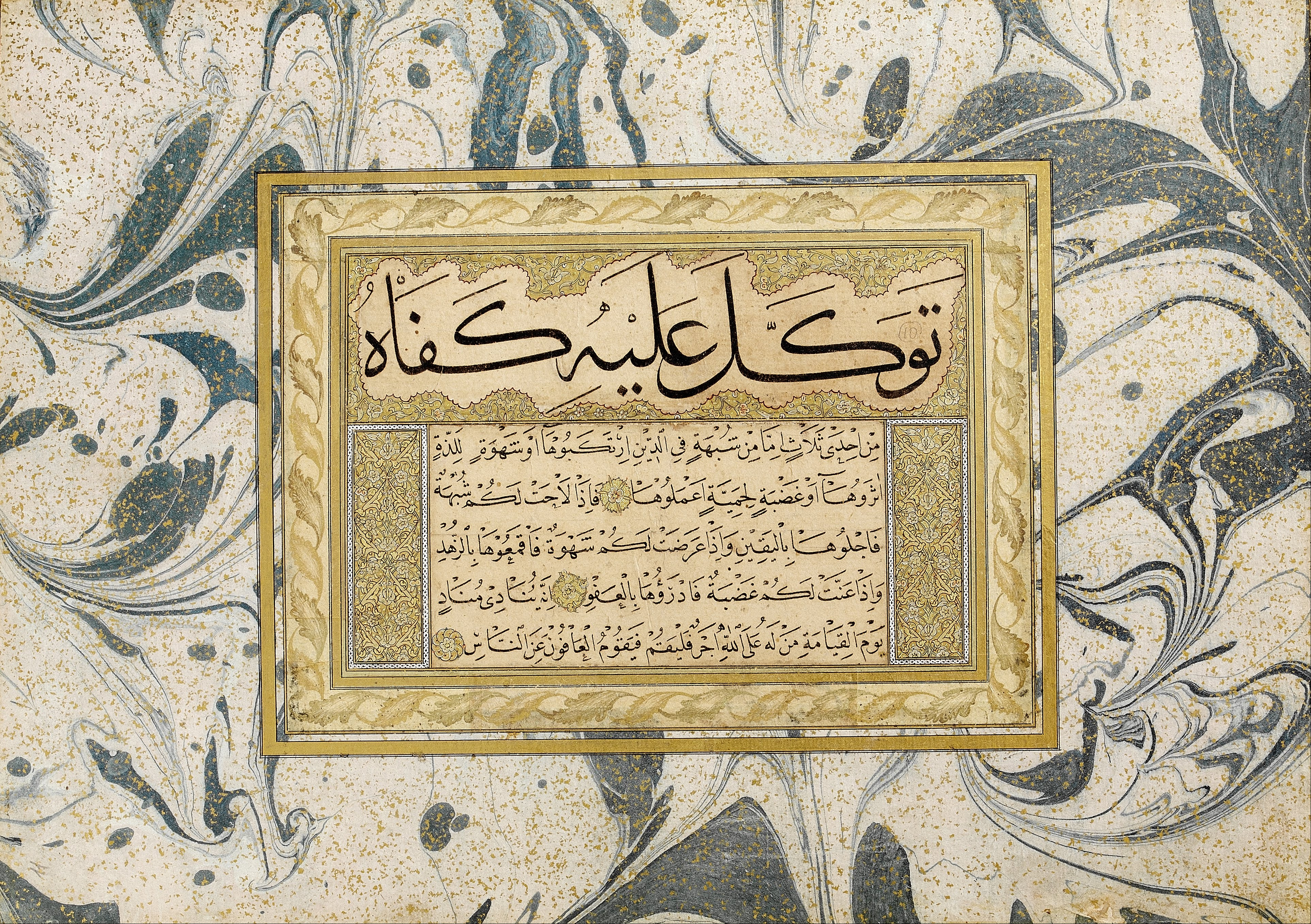
Calligraphies ascribed to Şeyh Hamdullah from Murakka (calligraphic album)

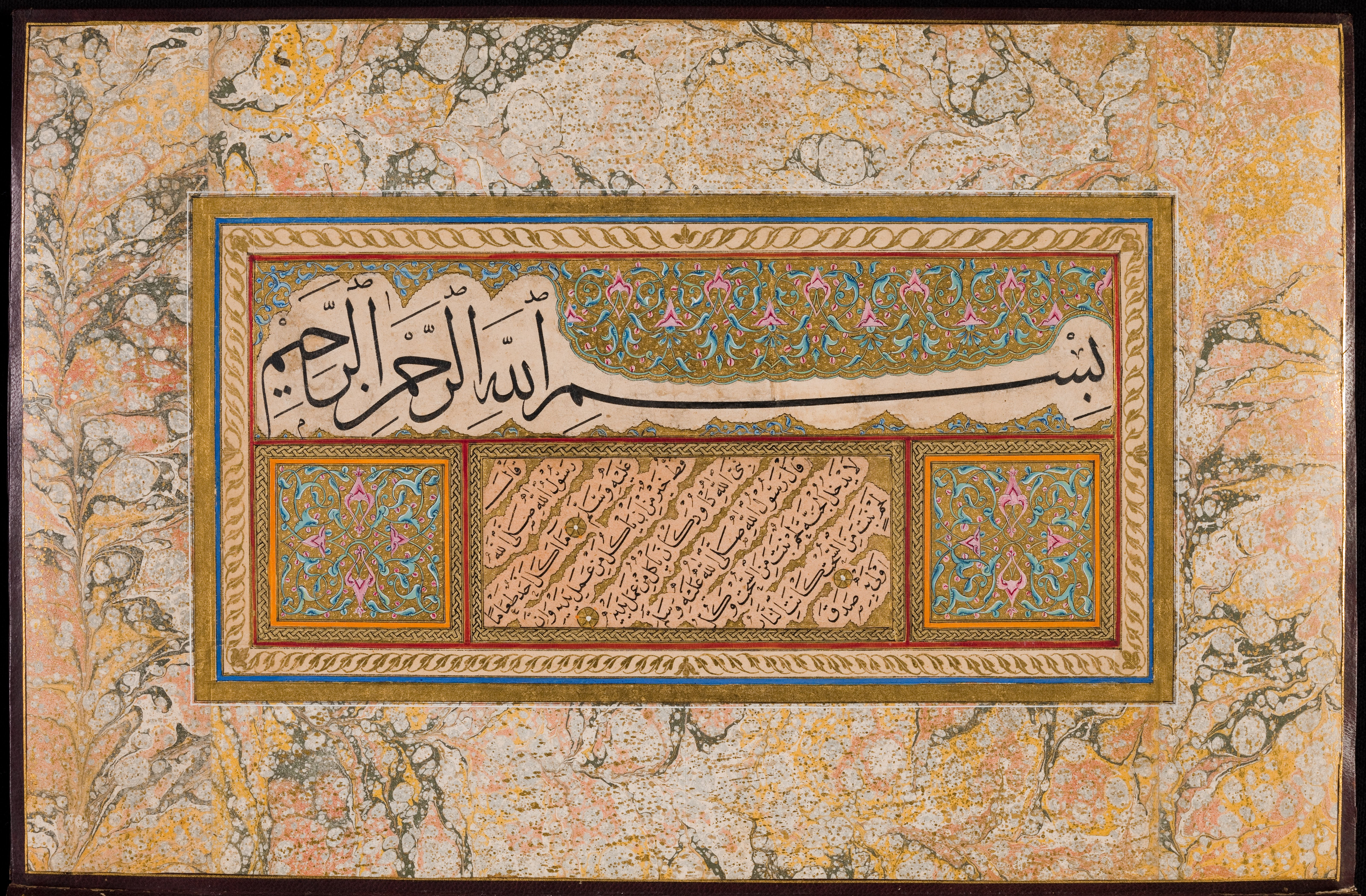
Leaf from calligraphic album (illumination from 18th century)

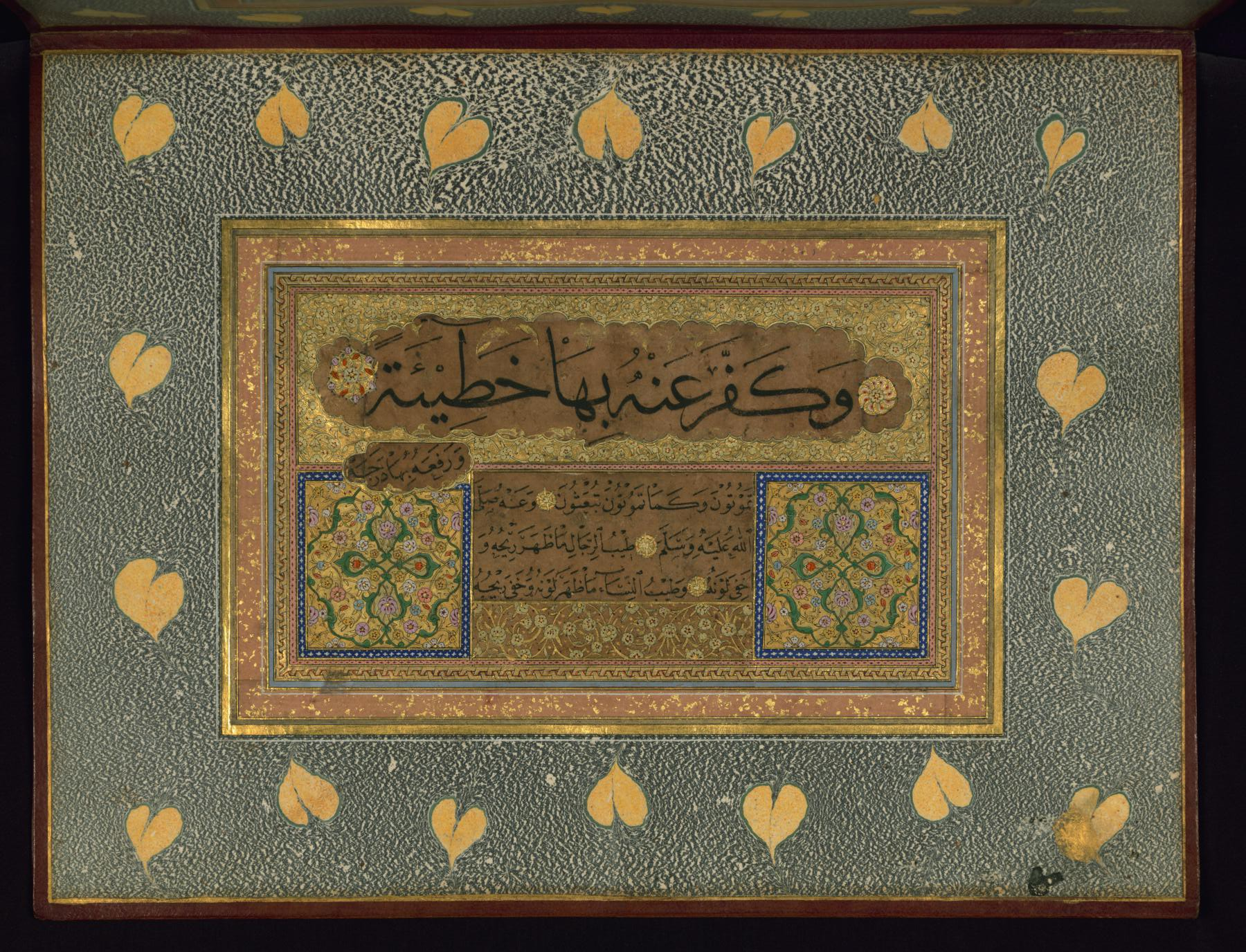
Page of Ottoman Calligraphy by Sheikh Hamdullah

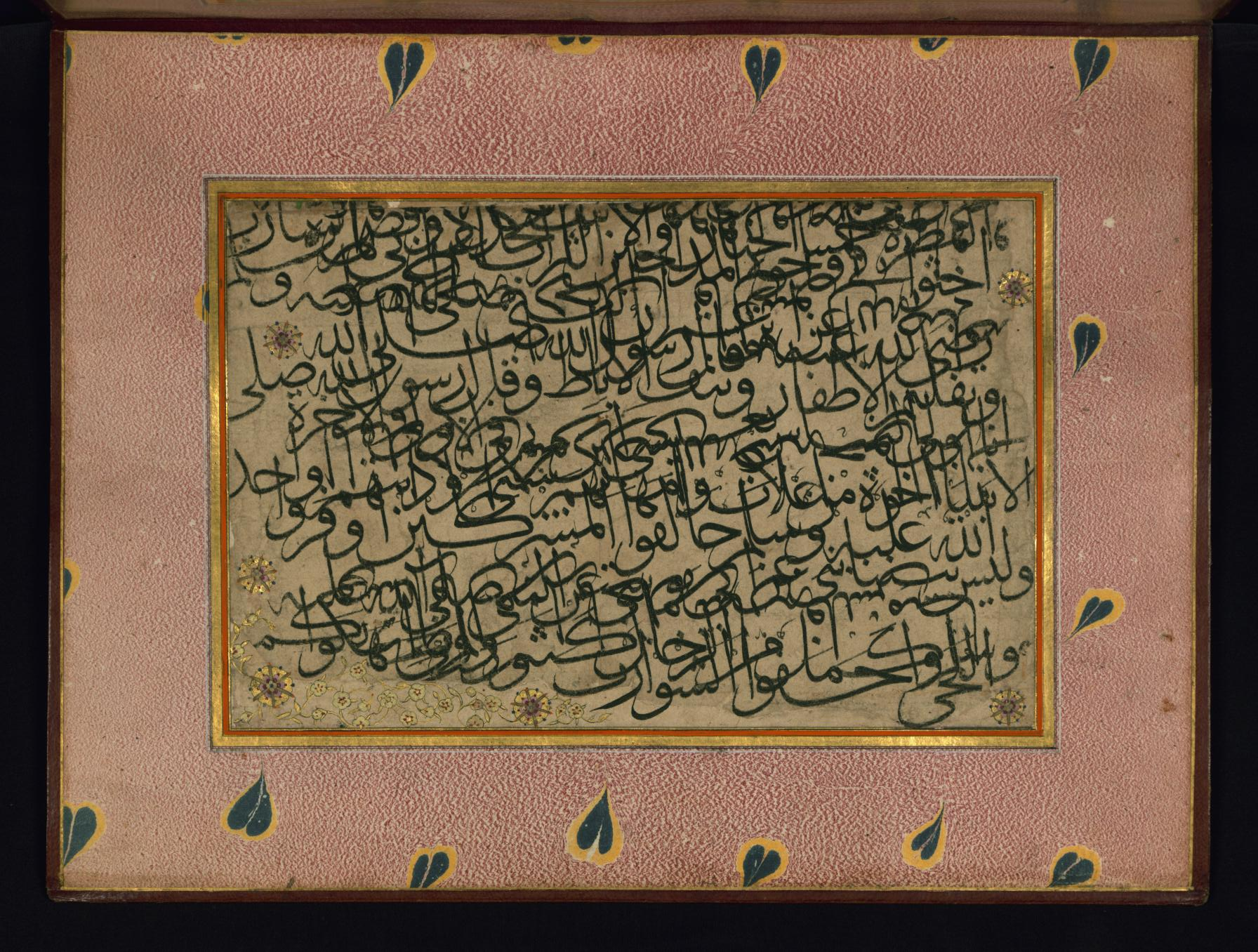
Page of Pen Exercises by Sheikh Hamdullah

== Legacy ==
Biographical dictionaries outlining the lineages of calligraphers emerged as a small, but important literary genre in the 16th and 17th centuries. In these works, a tradition of tracing an unbroken line of master-pupil relationships back to Sheikh Hamdullah, the man who was seen as the father of Ottoman calligraphy, is evident. These 'genealogies' continue to be published into the present.

Examples of these calligraphic genealogies include:

- Mustafa Âlî, Epic Deeds of Artists, first published in 1587
- Nefes-zade Ibrahim Efendi (d. 1650), Gülzâr-i Savâb [The Rose-garden of Proper Conduct], first published c. 1640
- Sayocluzâde Mehmed Necîb (d. 1757), Devhatü’l-küttâb (دوحة الكتّاب) [Genealogy of the Scribes, sometimes translated as the Great Tree of Penmen], first published c. 1737
- Müstakim-zade Süleyman Sa'deddin Efendi, Tuhfei Hattatin [Present for Calligraphers or sometimes translated as Choice Gift for Calligraphers], first published c. 1788
- "The Genealogy of Ottoman Calligraphers" in: M. Uğur Derman (ed.), Letters in Gold: Ottoman Calligraphy from the Sakıp Sabancı Collection, New York, Harry Abrams, 2010, pp 186–189

== See also ==
- Culture of the Ottoman Empire
- Islamic art
- Islamic calligraphy
- List of Ottoman calligraphers
- Ottoman art
