= Hâfiz Osman =

Ottoman calligrapher

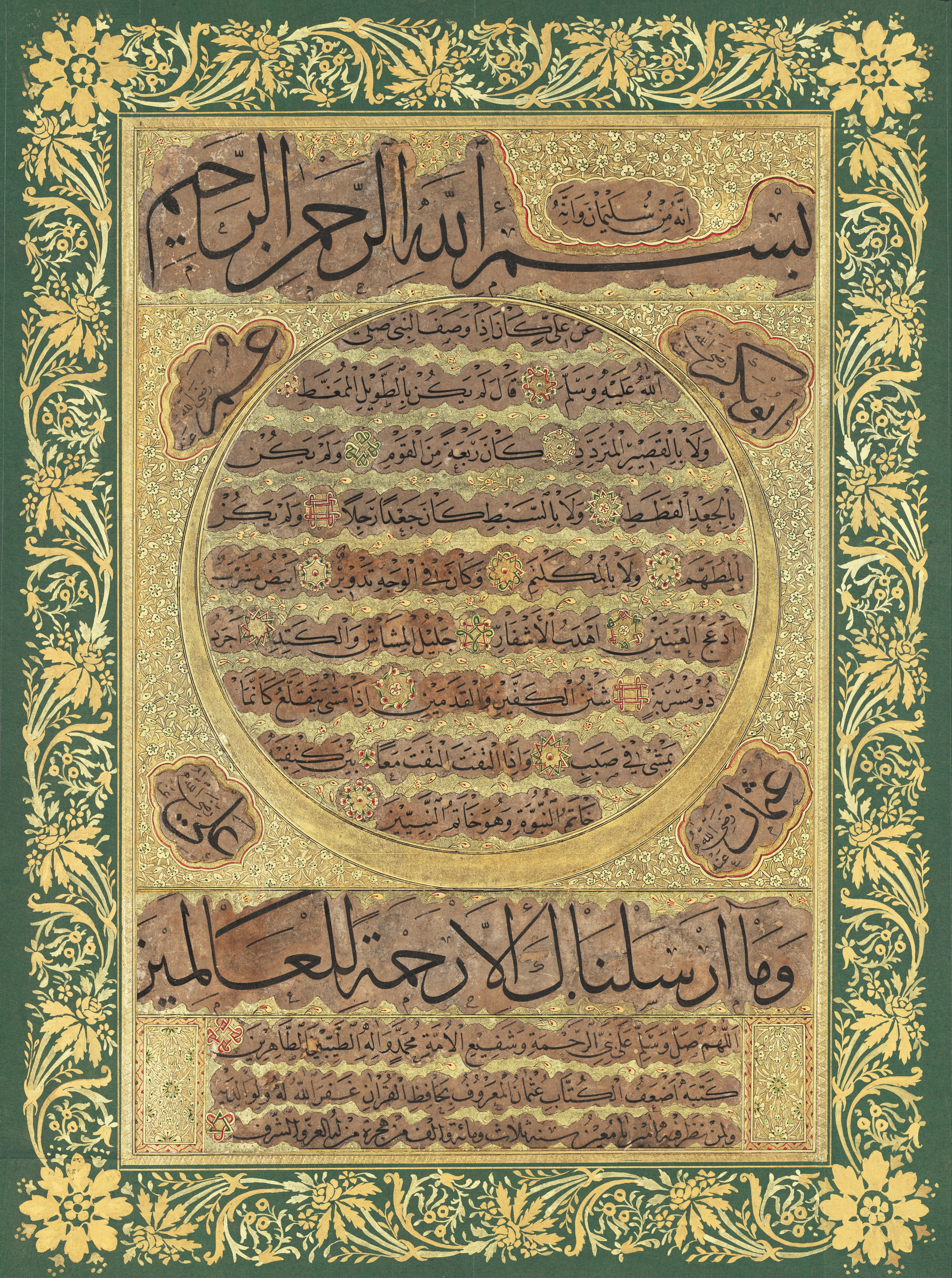
- A hilye by Hâfiz Osman.
- Born: 1642; Istanbul, Ottoman Empire
- Died: 1698 (aged 55–56); Istanbul, Ottoman Empire
- Known for: Islamic calligraphy
- Movement: Thuluth and Naskh

Hâfiz Osman (Ottoman Turkish: حافظ عثمان Modern Turkish: Hâfız Osman) (1642–1698) was an Ottoman calligrapher noted for improving the script and for developing a layout template for the hilye which became the classical approach to page design.

== History ==
Born Osman Den Ali, in Istanbul, he was of Dervish origin and worked under the name of Hâfiz Osman. His father was a muezzin at the Khassèki mosque, a position which afforded he and his family great protection.

He became an accomplished calligrapher and was a tutor to the sultans Ahmed II, Mustafa II and Ahmed III, and was held in high esteem by the sultan Mustafa II, who, according to legend often watched him work and held his inkwell as he wrote.

He received his formal training with Suyolcuzade Mustafa Eyyubi and Derviş Ali. He studied naskh and sulus with Derviş Ali, and was certified by Suyolcuzade Mustafa Eyyubi. Osman also admired the work of the 15th-century calligrapher, Şeyh Hamdullah, and spent many hours copying his works assiduously in order to perfect his craft.

Osman revived some of the six scripts that had fallen into disuse. These scripts underwent a process of purification and became known as "Hâfiz Osman's style". The younger generation of calligraphers preferred this style, and it gradually replaced Hamdullah's style.

Osman was not only a fine calligrapher, but was also a master of layout. He raised text design to new heights, often incorporating different styles of calligraphy on the same page. His masterpiece is the Ottoman hilye; a design template that includes eight distinct elements arranged aesthetically to provide for contemplative reflection and devotion. The elements are: Ba makan (prelude); Gobek (belly); Hilal (crescent); Ko'eler (corners); Ayak (verse); Etek (foot); Koltukar (alleys) and Pervaz (frame). His hilye became the standard layout in the Ottoman world.

A hilye is a calligraphic panel containing a hadith-based text describing the Prophet Muhammad's physical appearance and attributes. Hâfiz Osman incorporated such texts, which had been popular for some time, in a formal design that soon became standard for this art form. Hilye came to be used as wall decorations or surface adornments, fulfilling much the same function as figurative paintings in other religious traditions. While containing a concrete and artistically appealing description of Prophet's appearance, they complied with the strictures against figurative depictions of the Prophet, leaving his appearance to the viewer's imagination.

Hâfiz Osman also reinvigorated Hamdullah's tradition, in particular the re-introduction of a number of scripts that had fallen into disuse. Among his surviving works are copies of the Koran held at the Topkapi Palace Museum Library in Istanbul and the Nasser D. Khalili Collection. The volumes of the Koran produced by Osman were among the most highly sought after in his time.

He gave lessons to the poor on Sundays and lessons to the wealthy on Wednesdays. Throughout his lifetime, he trained a large number of calligraphers, of whom the finest was Yedikuleli Seyyid 'Abdullah Efendi.

== Works ==
Surviving examples of his work can be found in the Topkapi Collection.

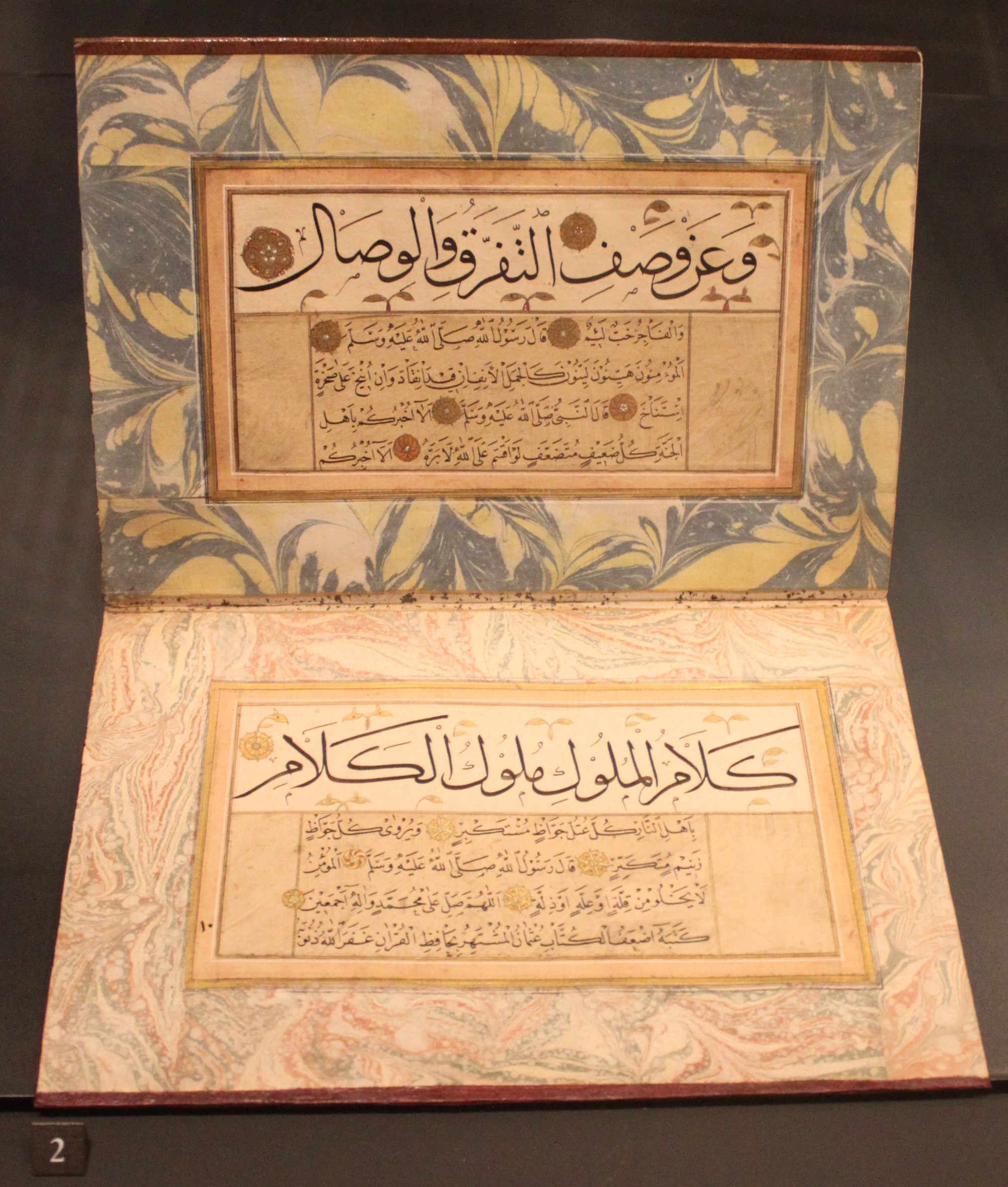

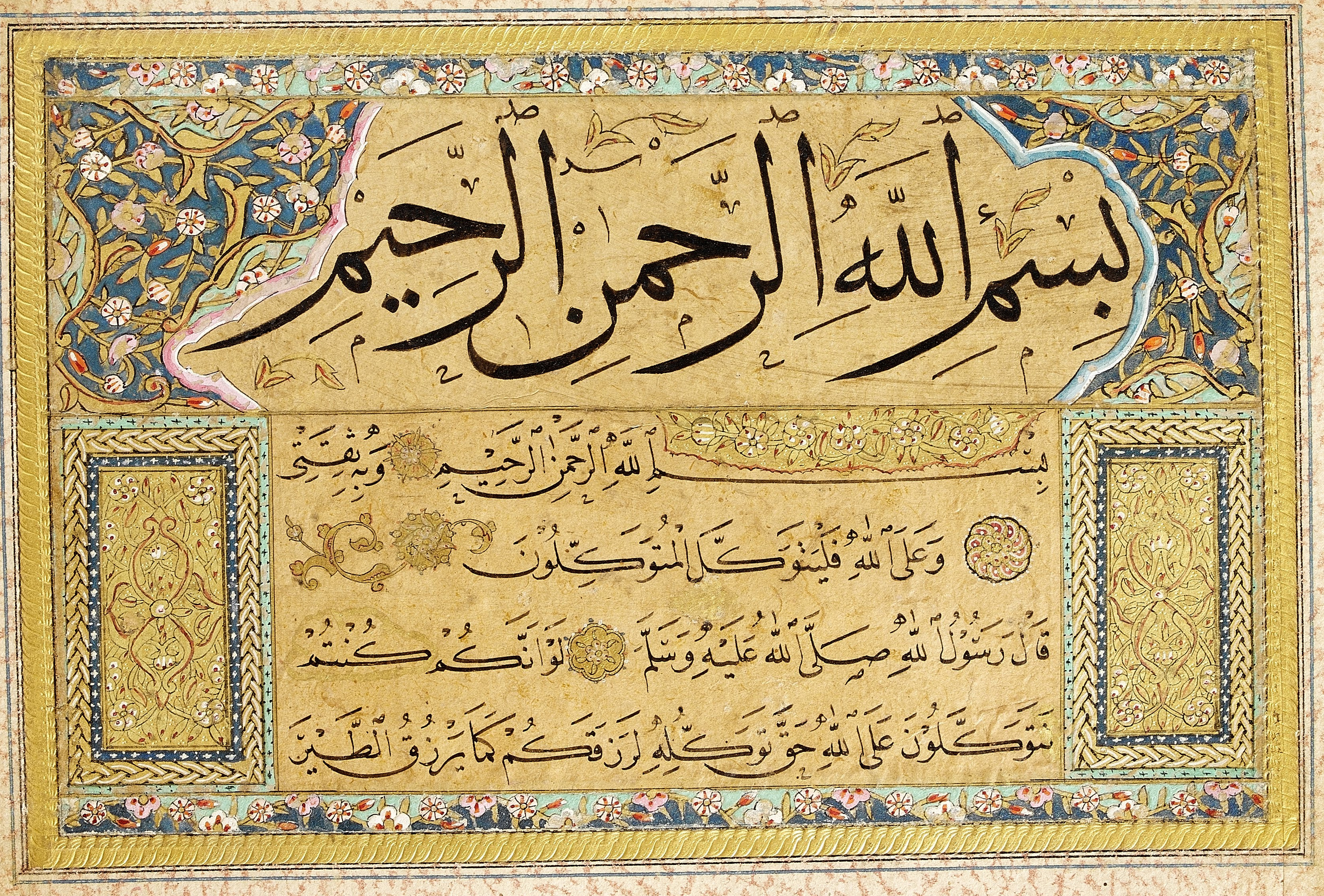

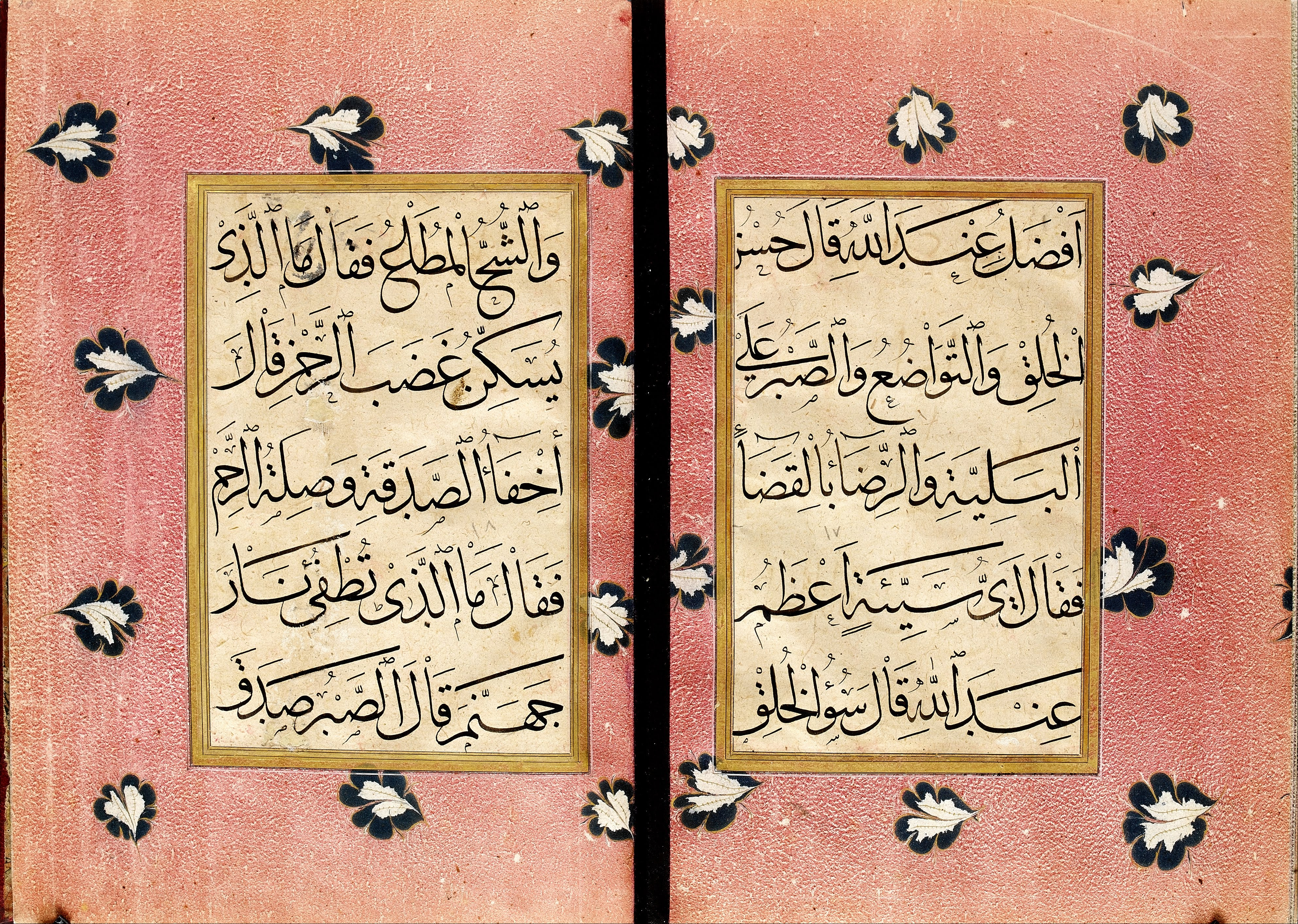

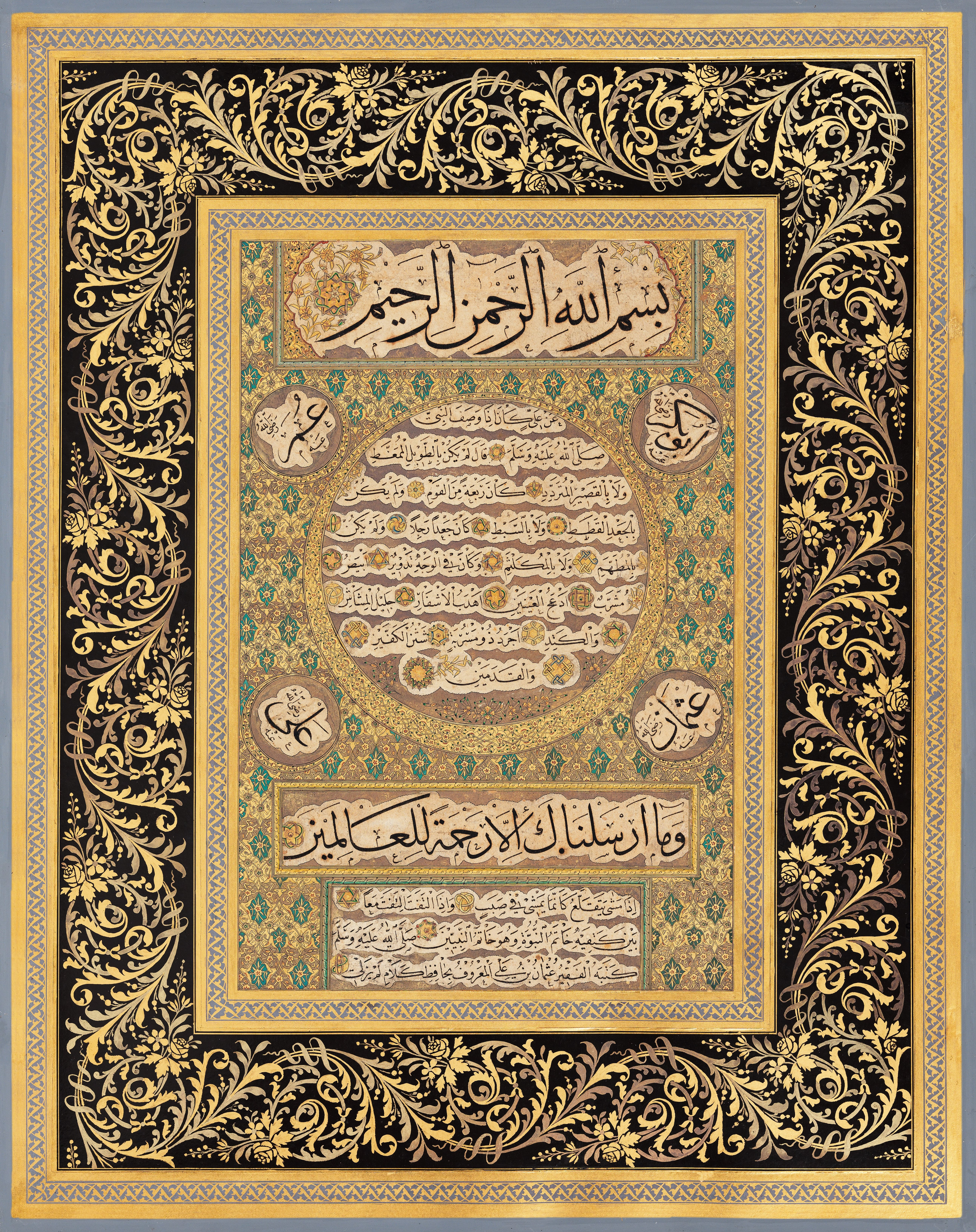

== See also ==
- Culture of the Ottoman Empire
- Islamic calligraphy
- List of Ottoman calligraphers
- Ottoman art
