= Mehmed Esad Yesari =

Ottoman calligrapher

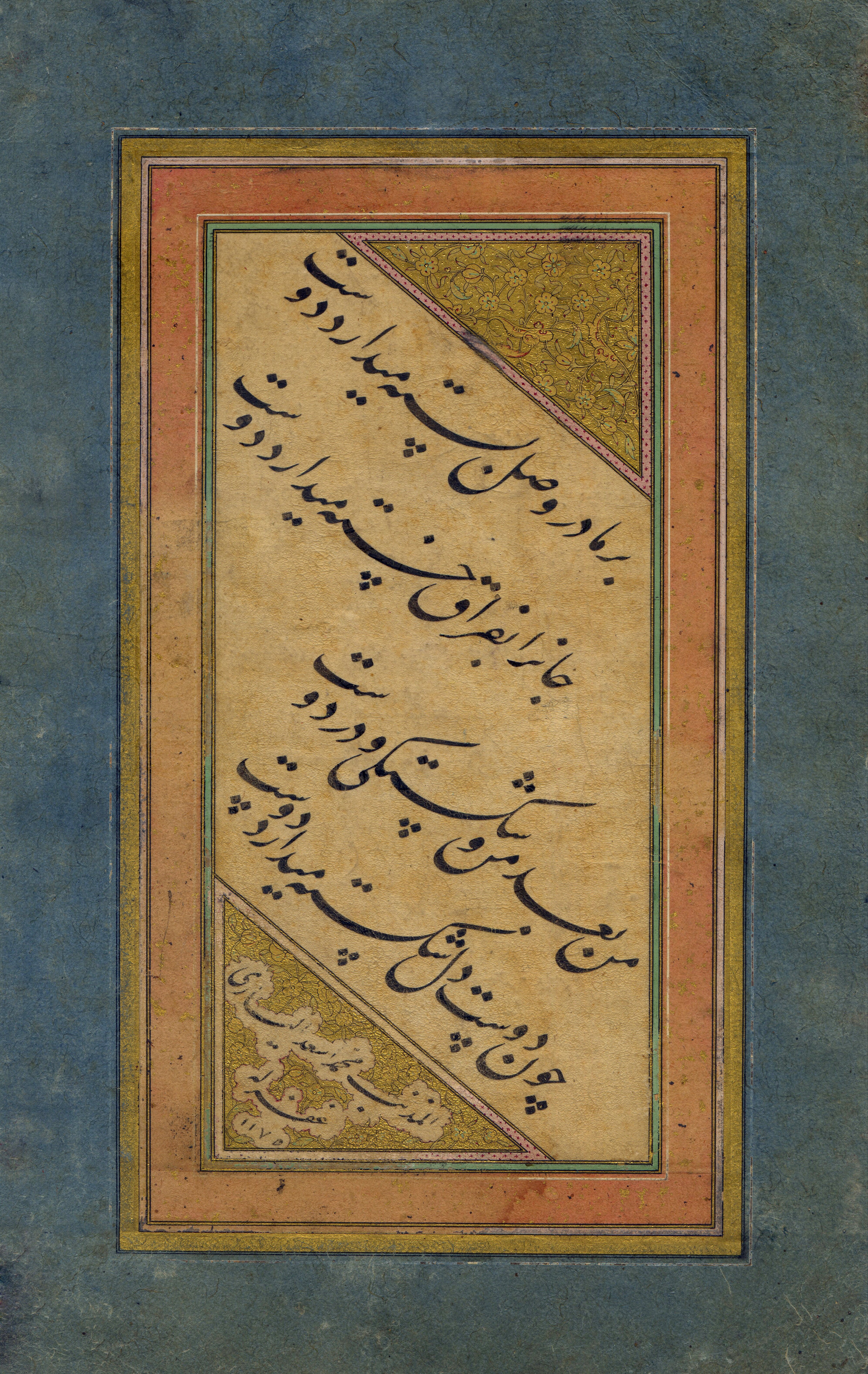
Calligraphic composition by Mehmed Esad Yesari

Mehmed Esad Yesari (Modern Turkish: Mehmet Es'ad Yesârî) (died 1798) (alternative names: Asad Yasārī, Taliknüvis Mehmed al-Assad, Şeyhülislam Veliyüddin Efendi) was an 18th-century Ottoman calligrapher known as the greatest calligrapher of his age.

== Life and work ==
Mehmed Esad Yesari was born in Istanbul, the son of Kara Mahmud Aga, bailiff to the Grand Judge of Anatolia. Born paralyzed on the right side of his body, he was given the nickname Yesari, meaning left-handed.

He began his training with Seyhulislam Veliyyüddin Efendi (d. 1768), but was turned away due to his poor condition. He then studied with Dedezade Mehmed Efendi (d.1758) who almost immediately recognised his talent. He was very frail and small. Due to his weakness he was carried from room to room in a custom-designed basket.

He was a master of the ta'liq script who made improvements to it and created works of great beauty. Early in his career, he followed the ta'liq style of the Persian master, Mir Emad Hassani. However, as he matured, he developed his own style by incorporating Persian elements with his own. This style, which ultimately became the 'Ottoman style' (nesta'lik), was later refined by his son, to the extent that it eclipsed the Persian original.

He served at the Imperial Palace of Sultan Mustafa III, where he produced many architectural monuments commissioned by the Sultan. He produced a number of kit'alar, muralaakar and levhar. He also produced inscriptions such as for Sultan Mehmet II's tomb, the Haci Selim Aga Library in Uskudar, the Beylerbeyi Mosque and inside the Barracks of the Black Eunechs (inside the harem); all of which exhibit the finest examples of ta'liq script.

His son and his pupil Yasarizade Mustafa 'Izzet (d. 1265/1849) also became a calligrapher of some note. Other notable students included Mehmet Sehabeddin and Mir Emin (1758-1809).

His son took Yesari on a pilgrimage to Mecca in 1792. After that, his condition worsened and he died on 19 December 1798. He was buried at a cemetery in the Gelenbevi section at the Fatih district of Istanbul.

== See also ==
- Culture of the Ottoman Empire
- Islamic calligraphy
- List of Ottoman calligraphers
- Nastaliq
- Ottoman art
