= Yesarizade Mustafa Izzet Efendi =

Ottoman calligrapher

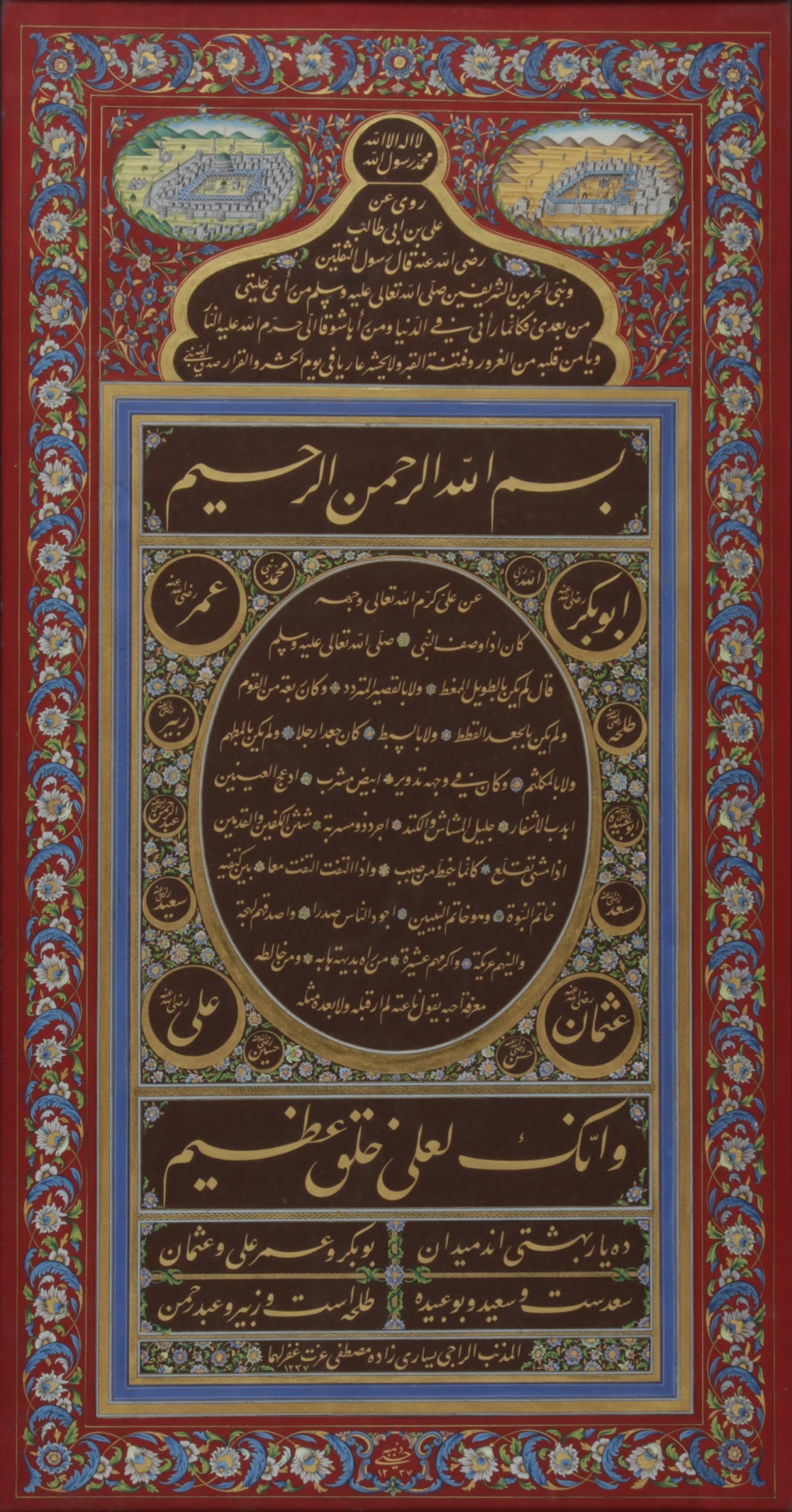
Hilya in nastaʿlīq script by Yesarizade Mustafa Izzet Efendi, Turkish and Islamic Arts Museum

Yesarizade Mustafa Izzet Efendi (Modern Turkish: Yesârîzâde Mustafa Izzet Efendi) (d. 1849) was an Ottoman calligrapher.

== Life and work ==
Yesarizade Mustafa Izzet Efendi's date of birth is not known, but is assumed to be in the 1770s. He was born in Constantinople and was the son of calligrapher Mehmed Esad Yesari.

After studying calligraphy with his father, he served as a Kazasker of Rumelia. Mustafa became a well known calligrapher in his own right and taught students at the Imperial Court.

His father had developed a unique style of ta'liq script called nesta'lik, which was based on elements from the Persian master Mir Emad Hassani, combined with stylistic elements developed by Mehmed Esad Yesari (Yesarizade's father). Yesarizade Mustafa Izzet built on changes made by his father, making further improvements and elaborating the rules for the method. This new style was called celî ta'liq and was much better suited to Ottoman tastes. His version of the script remains largely unchanged and has been passed down to the modern day

He died on 23 June 1849 and was buried near the Fâtih madrasah, next to his father. Their graves were moved following a fire in the district.

== See also ==
- Culture of the Ottoman Empire
- Islamic calligraphy
- List of Ottoman calligraphers
- Nastaliq
- Ottoman art
