= Neşâtî =

Neşāṭī (نشاطى;?–1674) was the pen name (Ottoman Turkish: ﻡﺨﻠﺺ maḫlas) of an Ottoman poet. He was a Sufi, or Islamic mystic, of the Mevlevi Order, and his poetry is often considered exemplary of the "Indian style" (سبك هندی sebk-i hindî) of Ottoman poetry, a movement which flourished beginning in the 17th century.

== Life ==
Though one source claims that Neşâtî's real name was Süleymân (سليمان), the majority of sources give his name as Ahmed (أحمد). He was born in Edirne, in the region of Thrace. It is not known exactly when he was born, though it is speculated that it was around the year 1600, on the evidence of a poem commemorating the winter of 1621–22, in which year the Bosphorus strait in Istanbul was known to be covered with ice:

ن نقش كوستره آیا مشاعبيز سرما
كه همچو آيينه يغ بسته اولدى صفحه آب

Ne naḳş göstere āyā müşa`biz-i sermā
Ki hemçü āyīne yaḫ-beste oldu safḥa-yi āb

Oh what designs might the magician of cold

display?

Like a mirror, the page of the water

is bound in ice

Neşâtî first become affiliated with the Mevlevi order as a disciple of the shaykh Ağazâde Mehmed Dede, first in Gelibolu in Thrace and then in Beşiktaş in Istanbul. After Ağazâde Mehmed Dede's death, Neşâtî went to Konya in central Anatolia, where he served for a time at the tomb of Jalal ad-Din Muhammad Rumi—the founder of the Mevlevi order—before finally returning, around the year 1670, to Edirne as the shaykh of the Murâdiyye Mevlevîhâne there. He died in 1674, and was buried in the courtyard of the Murâdiyye Mosque.

== Work ==
Neşâtî was not as prolific as many other Ottoman poets, but is nonetheless considered to be among the masters of the gazel form of poetry. He was strongly influenced by, and a great admirer of, the Persian poet `Urfī of Shîraz (d. 1591), about whom he wrote a treatise, the Şerḥ-i Müşkilāt-i `Urfī (شرح مشكلات عورفى "Explanation of the Difficulties of `Urfî"). It was primarily through the influence of `Urfî, among other Persian poets, that Neşâtî's poetry took on certain aspects of the so-called "Indian style", which was characterized by extravagant conceits; a complex, Persian-derived syntax; and a high level of lexical and syntactic ambiguity. An example is the following beyit, or couplet, from one of Neşâtî's most famous gazels:

كه خامه كبی شکوه طراز غم عاشقز
كه ناله كبی خامه شکواده نهانز

Geh ḫāme gibi şekve-ṭırāz-ı ġam-ı `āşkız
Geh nāle gibi ḫāme-yi şekvāda nihānız

Sometimes we are like the reed pen that illuminates

the plaints of love

Sometimes like the lament hidden in the pen

as it writes

The image used in the second line makes use of a double meaning—known in Ottoman Turkish as tevriyye (توريه)—of the word nāle (ناله): it can mean not only "lament" or "moan", but can also refer to a "reed pen", and specifically to the sound made by such a pen as it moves across the page in the act of writing.

Despite his word play, however, Neşâtî was also a poet of high—if sometimes restrained—emotion, as present-day Turkish poet İlhan Berk points out in a short essay:

Above all, Neşâtî was a master of expression, a man of great precision and sensitivity. Not a shouter, hidden, quiet, sparkling, genuine. In his poems, one is always struck with a great and profound sensation. More importantly, despite his being a Mevlevî poet ... he does not attempt to appear learned or to pretend to wisdom, but prefers in his poems to behave like a person, pure and simple. And like all great poets, he is humble. (Note: Her şeyden önce, büyük bir söyleyiş ustası, büyük bir duyarlık adamıdır Neşâtî. Bağırmayan, gizli, sessiz, parıltılı, özgün. Hep büyük, derin bir duyarlık vurur şiirlerinden. Daha önemlisi, Mevlevî bir şair olmasına karşın ... bilge görünmeye, bilgelik taslamaya yanaşmaz, şiirlerinde sade bir insan gibi davranmayı yeğler. Bütün büyük şairler gibi de alçakgönüllüdür.)

The honest and undisguised expression of emotion that Berk's appreciation hints at can be seen, for example, in the opening couplets to one of Neşâtî's most often anthologized gazels:

كتدك اما كه قودك حسرت ايله جانى بله
استه مم سنسز اولن صحبت يارانى بله

باغه سنسز واره مم چشممه آتش کورينور
كل خندانى دكل سرو خرامانى بله

Gitdiñ ammā ki ḳoduñ ḥasret ile cānı bile
İstemem sensiz olān ṣoḥbet-i yārānı bile

Baġa sensiz vāramam çeşmime āteş görünür
Gül-i ḫandānı degil serv-i ḫırāmānı bile

You're gone—I'm alone in the company

of longing

I no longer want sweet talk with friends

if you're not there

I dare not go to the garden without you
The laughing rose seems red as fire,

the swaying cypress a pointed flame
