= Ottoman illumination =

Style of decorative art in Ottoman Turkey

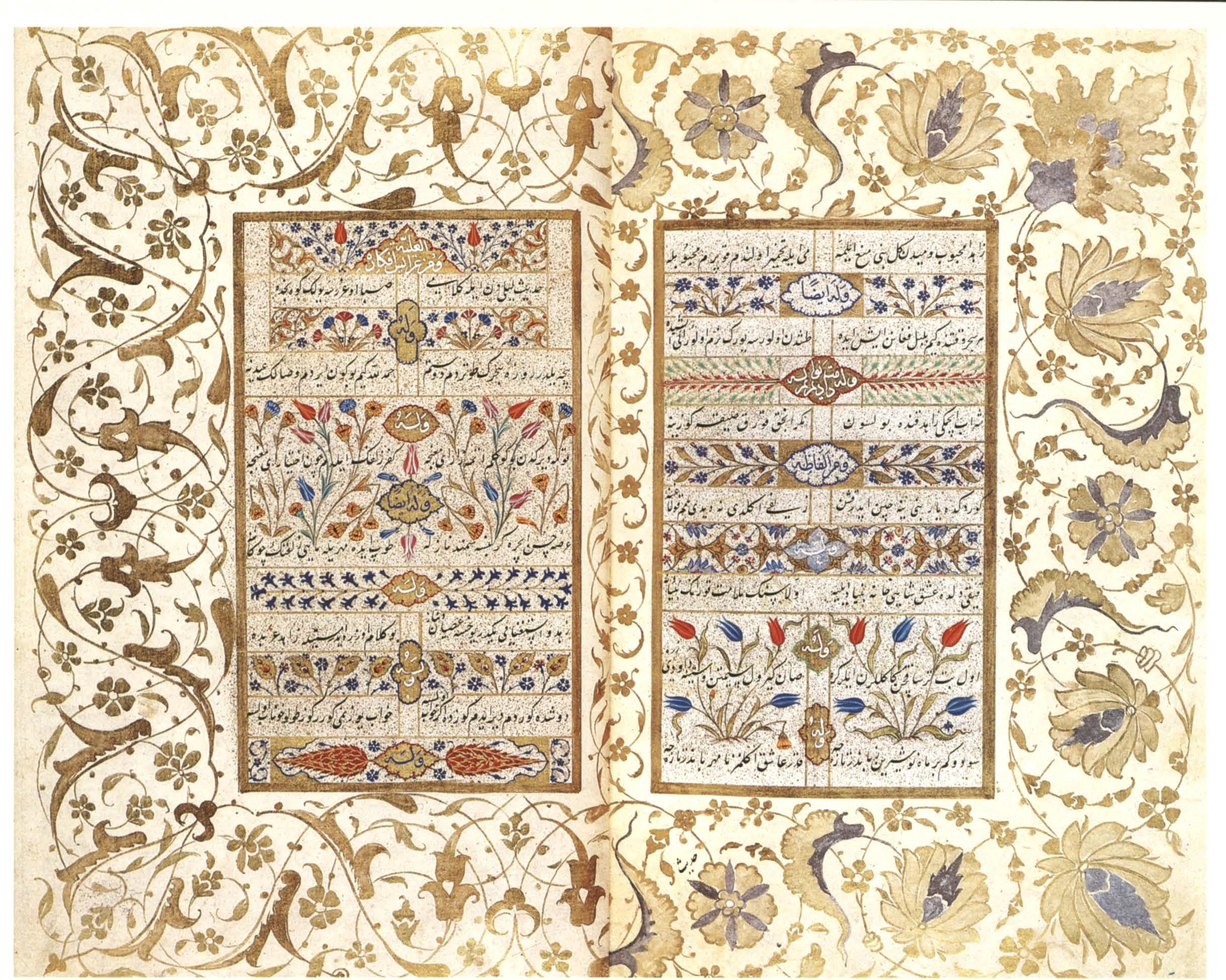
Double page from the "Divan-i Muhibbi", sultan Suleiman's collected poems written under the pseudonym Muhibbi, illuminated by Kara Memi. Istanbul, 1566. Istanbul University Library

Turkish or Ottoman illumination refers to non-figurative painted or drawn decorative art found in manuscripts or on sheets in muraqqa. In Turkish it is called “tezhip”, meaning “ornamenting with gold”. The Classical Islamic style of manuscript illumination combines techniques from Turkish, Persian, and Arabic traditions. Illumination was central to the traditional arts of the Ottoman Turks, who developed a style of illumination distinct from earlier traditions.

Manuscript illustration, such as the painting of the Ottoman miniature (taswir), was a distinct process from manuscript illumination, and each process was thus carried out by an artist specially trained in that particular craft.

Illumination design varies depending on the associated text. Poetic texts often featured decoration along the margins of the text block or interrupting columns of text. Copies of the Qur'an from the Ottoman period in the 14th and 16th centuries feature fully decorated opening pages (levha or plate illumination), with subsequent pages only featuring illumination on the edges of the text block (koltuk illumination).

Illumination techniques were used to decorate manuscripts of the Qur'an as well as other mediums such as decorative papers, book covers, textiles, ceramics, glass and wood panels, metal works, and architectural surfaces. Manuscripts of the Qur'an and literary or historical works were illuminated in palace workshops or in private artists' workshops. Illuminated manuscripts were generally accessible to sultans because of their high production cost. The production of illuminated works of art under royal or elite patronage contributed to the unity of style frequently observed in Turkish decorative arts.

== History ==
=== Pre-Ottoman Illumination (9th–10th centuries) ===
The first examples of illumination among Turks appeared on wall paintings and book adornments by the Uygur Turks. Illumination took hold in the 9th and 10th centuries as it was used to gild and adorn the margins of Qur'anic manuscripts. Kufic manuscripts of this period began to incorporate more elaborate geometric decoration as both an act of religious devotion and a tool for facilitating the text's legibility. Ottoman illuminators built upon the legacy established by these pre-Ottoman artists while incorporating their own styles and techniques.

=== Early Ottoman Illumination (13th–15th centuries) ===
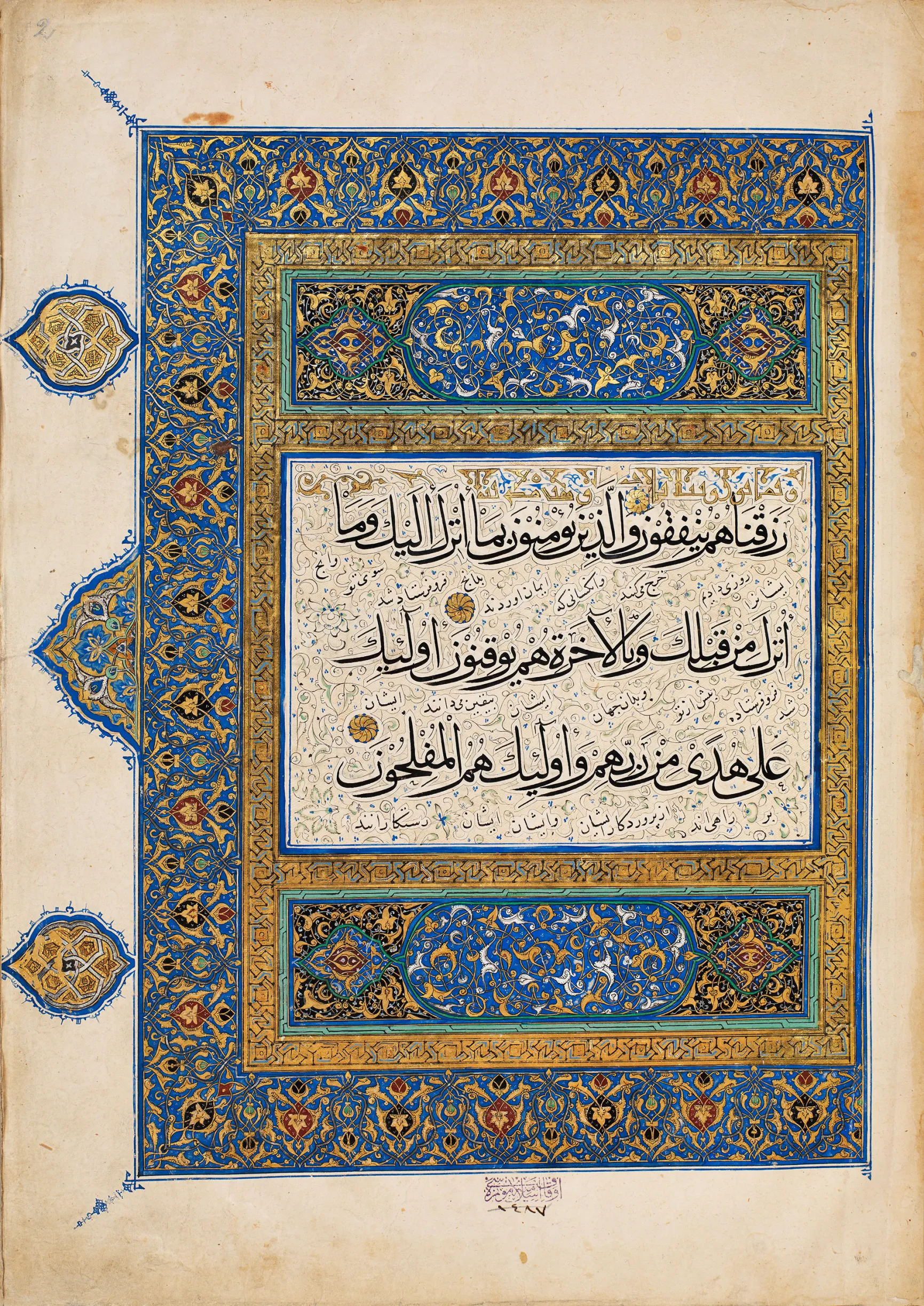
Page from the Qur'an. Probably Edirne, 1457–58. Turkish and Islamic Arts Museum

During the reign of the Seljuk Turks in the 13th and 14th centuries, illumination techniques spread across Central Asia and Asia Minor. Illuminations of this period were characterized by geometric designs and motifs. Palace workshops, set up during the reign of Sultan Mehmed the Conqueror, produced most examples of illumination. Prominent artist Baba Naqqash led an ornamentation workshop established by Sultan Mehmed the Conqueror at Topkapi Palace, producing masterpieces while training new students in the art of illumination.

Beginning in the 15th century, refined techniques in papermaking and page dyeing allowed for the incorporation of more varied colors in paper manuscripts. Pages could be decorated with gold dust or marbled using the abri technique imported from China.

In the 16th century, the art of Ottoman illumination experienced its second peak since the reign of Sultan Mehmed II. The style of Classical Turkish Illumination emerged, while illumination began to be used more widely beyond book adornment, decorating forms of art such as weaving and ceramics.

=== Golden Age (c. 1520–1566) ===
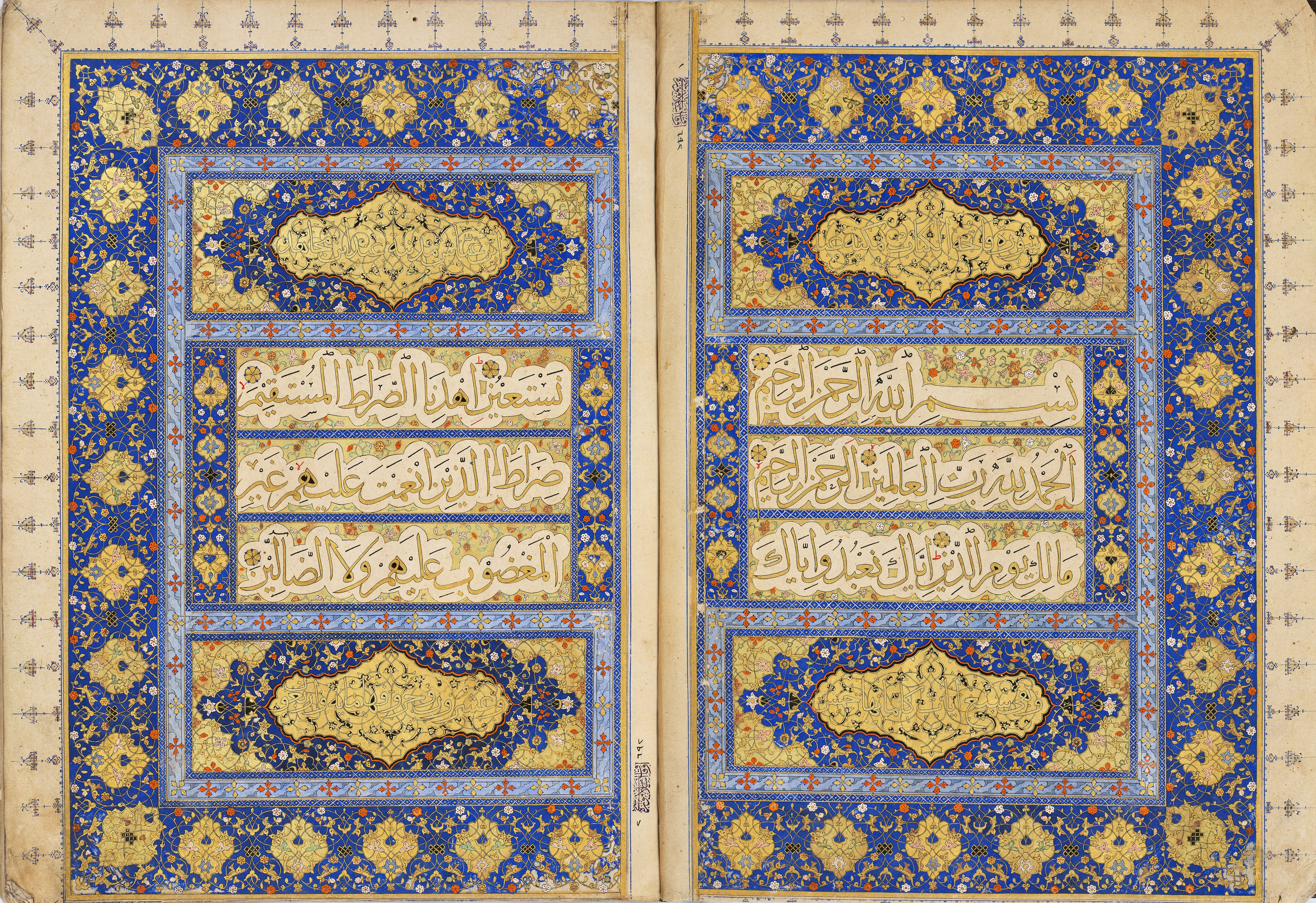
Opening pages from the Qur'an probably meant for Selim I (1512–1520). Istanbul, dated September 1517. Turkish and Islamic Arts Museum

The 'Golden Age' of Ottoman illumination occurred during the reign of Sultan Suleiman the Magnificent, spanning from 1520 to 1566. Illumination was used to decorate royal edicts and insignias, book covers, heads of Qur'anic chapters, and end pages. Artists, working out of royal workshops, primarily utilized gold and navy blue ink. Ottoman artists Shah Kulu of Baghdad and his student, Karamemi, pioneered the naturalistic "Sazyolu" (reed) style, characterized by its vegetal forms. Karamemi later introduced the "Halic work" style to Ottoman illumination tradition while serving as chief illuminist at the ornamentation workshop in the palace of Sultan Suleiman the Magnificent.

=== European Influences (18th–20th centuries) ===
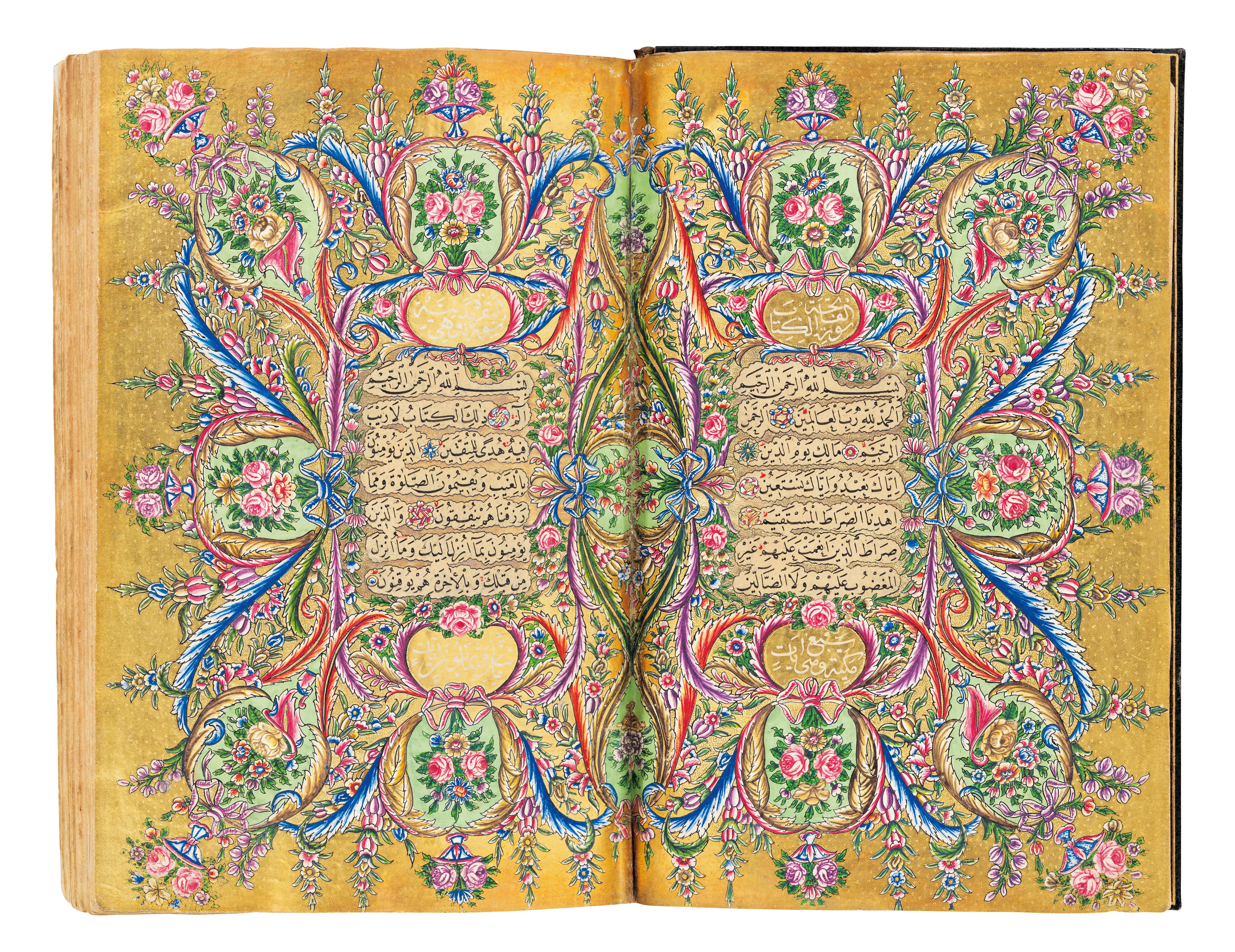
Qur'an copied by Abdullah Zühdi, 1848–49. Sadberk Hanım Museum

The Tulip Period of illumination (1718–1730) was characterized by the incorporation of large flowers and bouquets into decoration, influenced by the styles of the French Rococo. These three-dimensional and naturalistic floral designs and reflected the influence of cultural Westernization. Prominent artists of this period include Ahmed Efendi, Ali Ragip, Rashid, and Ahmed Ataullah.

The rise of printing in the 19th century led to a decline in illumination. The 20th century, however, witnessed a revival of the art form thanks to champions like Süheyl Ünver, Rikkat Kunt, Muhsin Demironat, Ismail Hakki Altunbezer, and Feyzullah Dayigil. With the foundation of Turkish Decorative Arts section within the Academy of Fine Arts, new generations of illumination artists were educated. Today there are many artists in the field of illumination, such as Çiçek Derman, Gülnur Duran, Şahin İnalöz, Cahide Keskiner, Ülker Erke, Melek Anter and Münevver Üçer (all of whom are women).

== Common motifs ==
=== Geometric ===
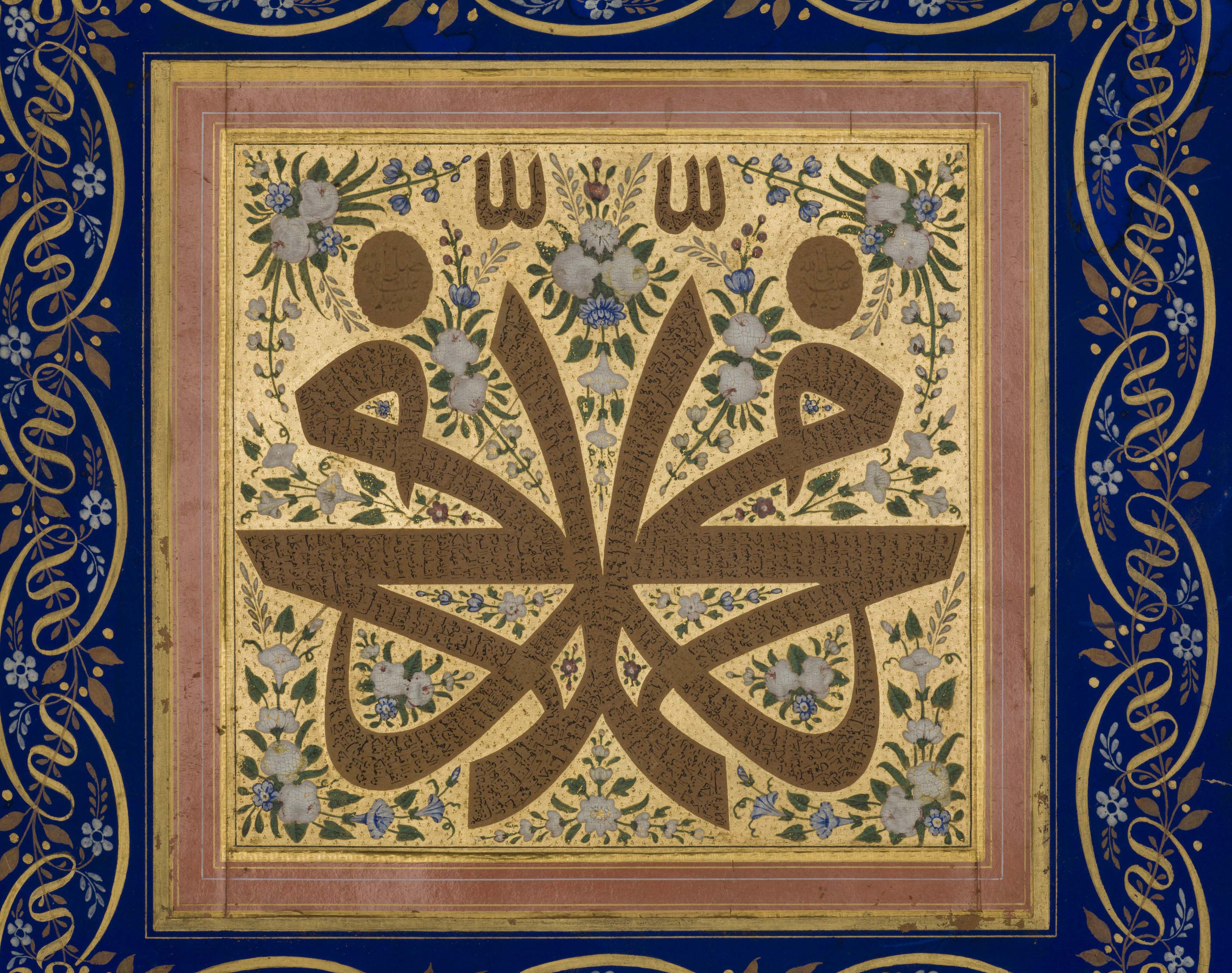
The name "Muhammad" reflected with Quranic verses inside. Khalili Collection of Islamic Art

Geometric patterns gained popularity during the 13th century under the Seljuk Dynasty and Ilkhanate, with their usage continuing through the Early Ottoman period.

Geometric forms such as squares, circles, triangles, and stars were often combined into a singular motif. The weaving of these forms was believed to signify infinity.

Geometric motifs are often employed in single or double frontispieces, also referred to as carpet pages. These pages feature full-page illuminations employing geometric and vegetal motifs such as arabesques and palmettes.

=== Vegetal ===
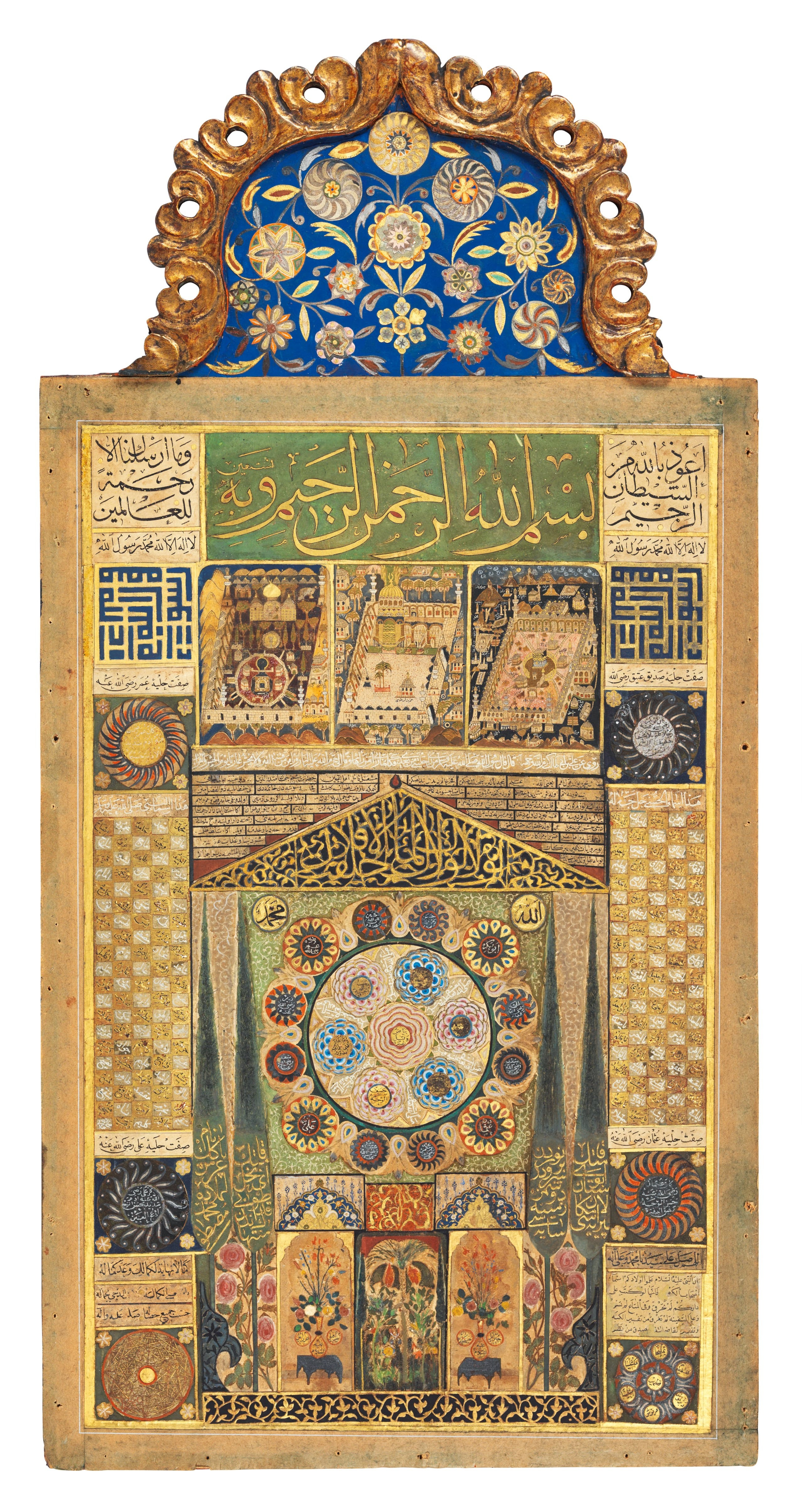
Hilye-i Şerif, c. 1725. Sadberk Hanım Museum

Rumi is a commonly used ornamental motif originating in Central Asia and further developed by the Anatolian Seljuks. Rumi emerged through the stylization of animal wings, legs, and trunks, but in the 13th century, Ottoman illuminators adopted the motif, varying its forms.

Vegetal forms, including stylized leaves, stems and buds (such as the gonca, or unopened flower), were a common element of the khatai style of illumination. Khatai flowers are usually symmetrical on a vertical axis. Another common vegetal motif is the panch, or five-pointed foliation. These forms were often used in the center of a design.

Munhani, or 'curved line' motifs were commonly used between the 11th and 15th centuries, particularly in the ornamentation of handwritten manuscripts.

Shukufa or naturalist flower motifs were commonly employed in Ottoman illuminating from the 17th century onward. These motifs emerged alongside the rise of European Baroque and Rococo influences. This motif involves the stylization of different flowers, including the tulip, carnation, violet, and iris.

=== Cloud-chain ===
During the 15th century, under the patronage of the Timurid Empire, a more delicate style of illumination relying on cloud-chain motifs began to take hold. This movement replaced the geometric Ilkhanid style of illumination that had emerged in the 13th century in Persia and Iraq.

The bulut or cloud motif is a stylized representation of a cloud's movement across the sky. The two main forms of the cloud motif are the free cloud and the aggregate cloud. Free clouds are drawn independently in a design, while aggregate clouds combine individual clouds with the incorporation of curved lines. Aggregate cloud bands between medallion motifs were a characteristic feature of illumination during the reign of Bayezid II.

=== Decorative Forms ===
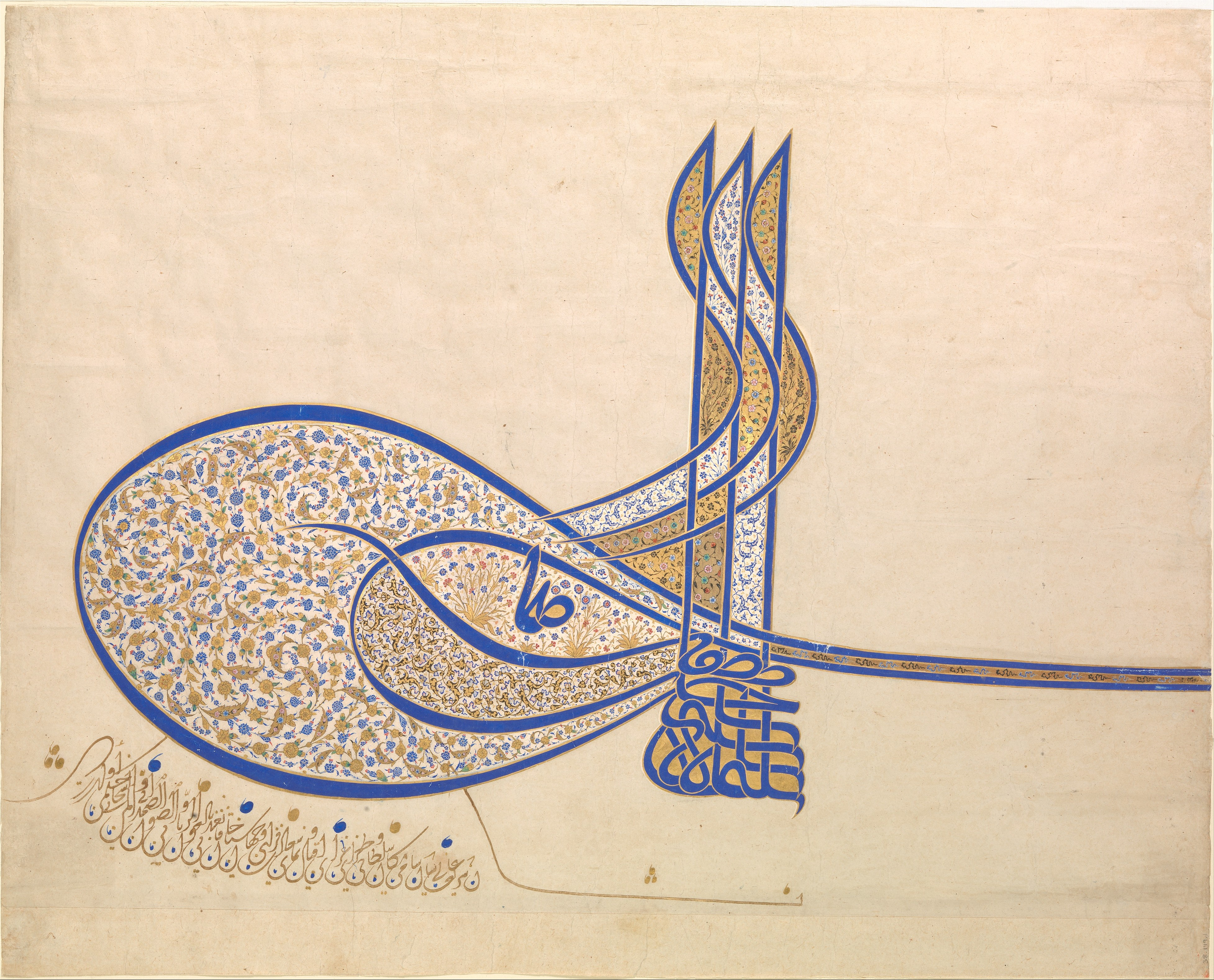
Tughra of Suleiman the Magnificent (1520–1566), c. 1555–1560. Metropolitan Museum of Art

The shamsa is a round form symbolizing the sun and light. These forms were commonly employed on the bound or inner covers of handwritten works. The shamsa motif could also be encircled by curvilinear or vegetal motifs, or overlapped with other geometric forms to resemble petals.

The hilye is a calligraphic illustration including a written description of the Islamic Prophet Muhammad's physical characteristics and traits. The text of the hilye was often contained within an illuminated circular or rectangular cartouche.

The tughra is a symbol representing the insignia of the sultan, often included at the top of an Ottoman imperial ferman or edict. Karamemi-style flowers were commonly used to decorate the insignia.
