= Muhammad Zakariya =

Muhammad Zakariya may refer to:

- Muhammad ibn Zakariya al-Razi (born 865), Persian alchemist, chemist, physician, philosopher and scholar
- Muhammad Zakariya al-Kandahlawi (born 1898), Indian Sunni Muslim scholar
- Mohamed Zakariya (born 1942), American caligrapher
