= Islamic calligraphy =

Artistic practice of calligraphy in Islamic contexts

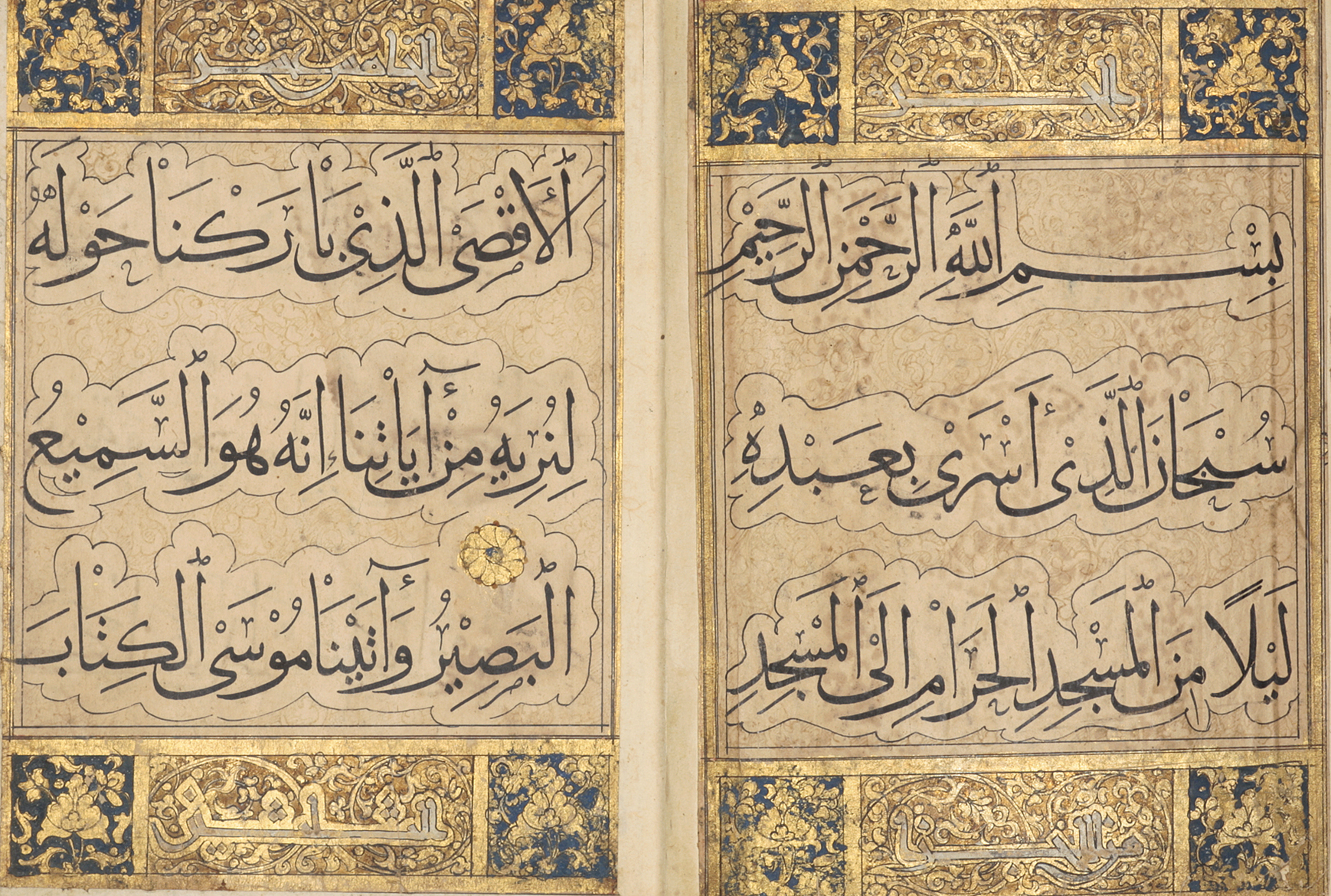
The surah "Al-Isra'" copied by the 13th century calligrapher Yaqut al-Musta'simi in muhaqqaq script with Kufic incidentals.

Islamic calligraphy is the artistic practice of penmanship and calligraphy, in the languages which use the Arabic alphabet or the alphabets derived from it. It is a highly stylized and structured form of handwriting that follows artistic conventions and is often used for Islamic religious texts, architecture, and decoration. It includes Arabic, Persian, Ottoman, and Urdu calligraphy. It is known in Arabic as khatt Arabi (خط عربي), literally meaning "line", "design", or "construction".

The development of Islamic calligraphy is strongly tied to the Quran, as chapters and verses from the Quran are a common and almost universal text upon which Islamic calligraphy is based. Although artistic depictions of people and animals are not explicitly forbidden in the Quran, Islamic traditions have often limited figural representation in Islamic religious texts in order to avoid idolatry. Some scholars argue that Kufic script was developed by the late 7th century in Kufa, Iraq, from which it takes its name. This early style later evolved into several forms, including floral, foliated, plaited or interlaced, bordered, and square Kufic. In the ancient world, though, artists sometimes circumvented aniconic prohibitions by creating intricate calligraphic compositions that formed shapes and figures using tiny script. Calligraphy was a valued art form, and was regarded as both an aesthetic and moral pursuit. An ancient Arabic proverb illustrates this point by emphatically stating that "purity of writing is purity of the soul."

Beyond religious contexts, Islamic calligraphy is widely used in secular art, architecture, and decoration. Its prominence in Islamic art is not solely due to religious constraints on figurative imagery, but rather reflects the central role of writing and the written word in Islamic culture. Islamic calligraphy evolved primarily from two major styles: Kufic and Naskh, with numerous regional and stylistic variations. In the modern era, Arabic and Persian calligraphy have influenced modern art, particularly in the post-colonial Middle East, and have also inspired the fusion style known as calligraffiti.

== Instruments and media ==
The traditional instrument of the Islamic calligrapher is the qalam, a pen normally made of dried reed or bamboo. The ink is often in colour and chosen so that its intensity can vary greatly, creating dynamism and movement in the letter forms. Some styles are often written using a metallic-tip pen.

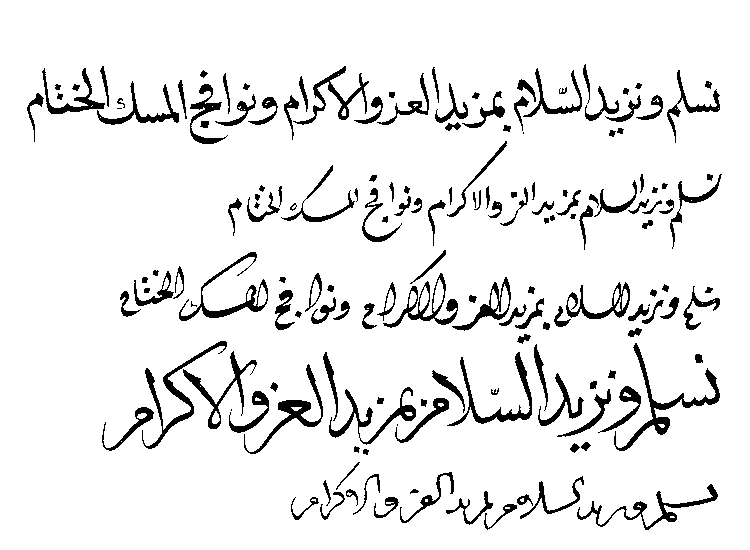
Five principal Arabic calligraphic cursive styles: 1. Naskh; 2. Nasta'liq; 3. Diwani; 4. Thuluth; 5. Reqa

Islamic calligraphy can be applied to a wide range of decorative mediums other than paper, such as tiles, vessels, carpets, and stone. Before the advent of paper, papyrus and parchment were used for writing. During the 9th century, an influx of paper from China revolutionized calligraphy. Libraries in the Muslim world regularly contained hundreds and even thousands of books.

For centuries, the art of writing has fulfilled a central iconographic function in Islamic art. Although the academic tradition of Islamic calligraphy began in Baghdad, the centre of the Islamic empire during much of its early history, it eventually spread as far as India and Spain.

Coins were another support for calligraphy. Beginning in 692, the Islamic caliphate reformed the coinage of the Near East by replacing Byzantine Christian imagery with Islamic phrases inscribed in Arabic. This was especially true for dinars, or gold coins of high value. Generally, the coins were inscribed with quotes from the Quran.

By the tenth century, the Persians, who had converted to Islam, began weaving inscriptions onto elaborately patterned silks. So precious were textiles featuring Arabic text that Crusaders brought them to Europe as prized possessions. A notable example is the Suaire de Saint-Josse, used to wrap the bones of St. Josse in the Abbey of St. Josse-sur-Mer, near Caen in north-western France.

As Islamic calligraphy is highly venerated, most works follow examples set by well-established calligraphers, with the exception of secular or contemporary works. In the Islamic tradition, calligraphers underwent extensive training in three stages, including the study of their teacher's models, in order to be granted certification.

== Styles ==
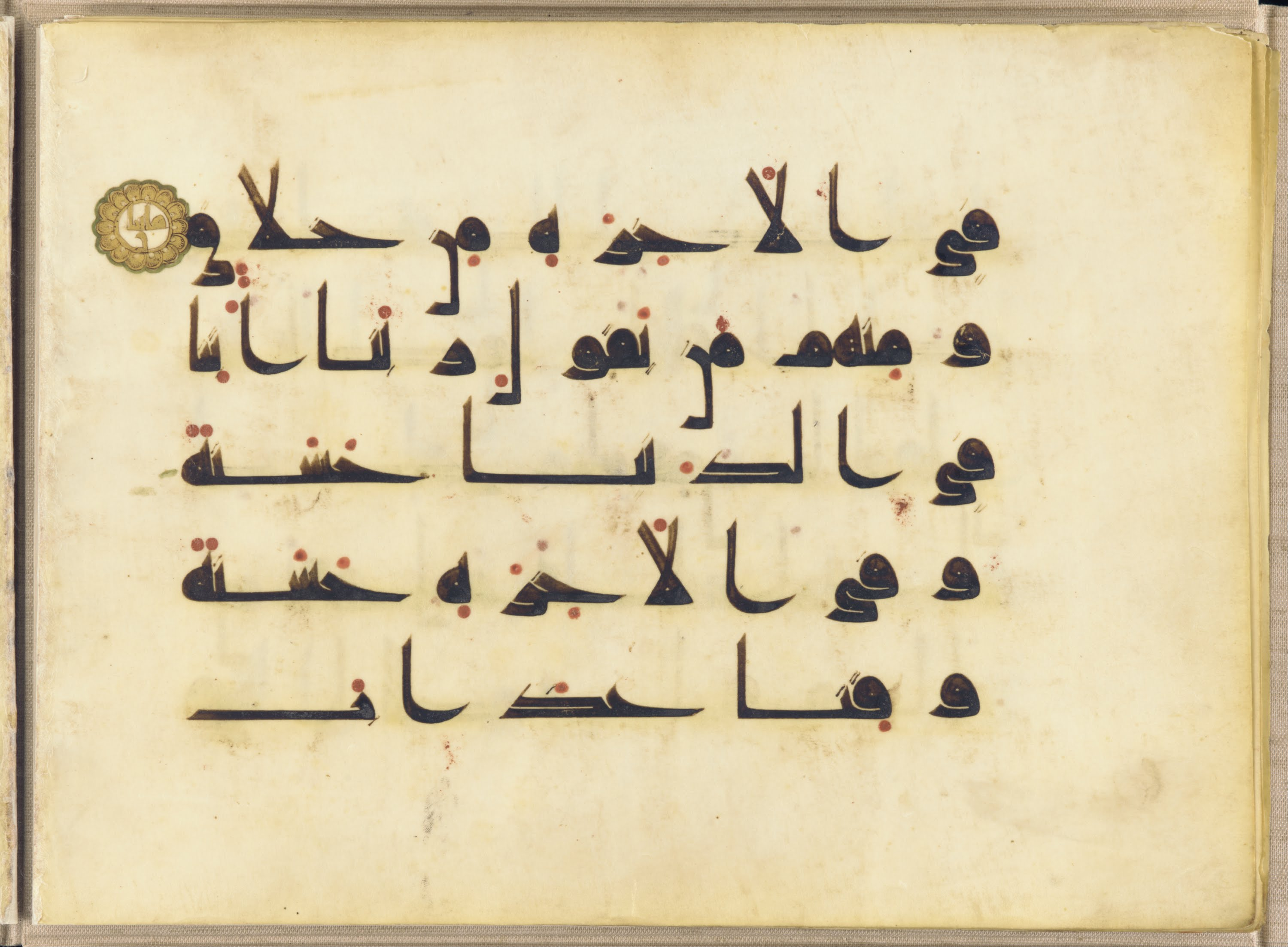
9th century Quran, an early Kufic example from the Abbasid period

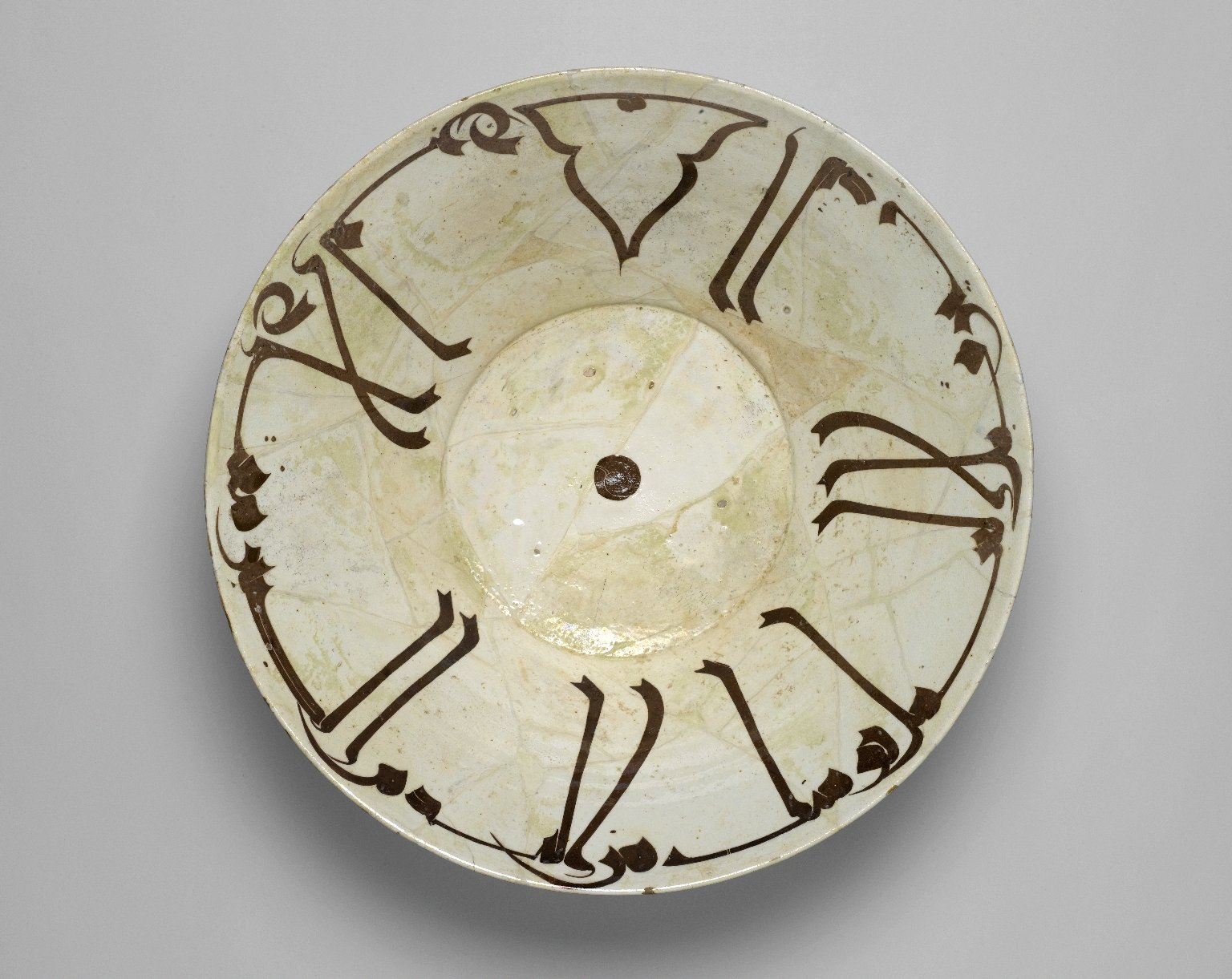
Bowl with Kufic calligraphy, 10th century. Brooklyn Museum

=== Kufic ===
The Kufic style emphasizes rigid and angular strokes, it developed alongside the Naskh script in the 7th century. Although some scholars dispute this, Kufic script was supposedly developed around the end of the 7th century in Kufa, Iraq, from which it takes its name. The style later developed into several varieties, including floral, foliated, plaited or interlaced, bordered, and square kufic. Due to its straight and orderly style of lettering, Kufic was frequently used in ornamental stone carving as well as on coins. It was the main script used to copy the Quran from the 8th to 10th century and went out of general use in the 12th century when the flowing naskh style became more practical. However, it continued to be used as a decorative element to contrast superseding styles.

There was no set rules of using the Kufic script; the only common feature is the angular, linear shapes of the characters. Due to the lack of standardization of early Kufic, the script differs widely between regions, ranging from very square and rigid forms to flowery and decorative ones.

Common varieties include square Kufic, a technique known as banna'i. Contemporary calligraphy using this style is also popular in modern decorations.

Decorative Kufic inscriptions are often imitated into pseudo-Kufics in medieval and Renaissance Europe. Pseudo-Kufics is especially common in Renaissance depictions of people from the Holy Land. The exact reason for the incorporation of pseudo-Kufic is unclear. It seems that Westerners mistakenly associated 13th–14th century Middle Eastern scripts with systems of writing used during the time of Jesus, and thus found it natural to represent early Christians in association with them.

=== Naskh ===
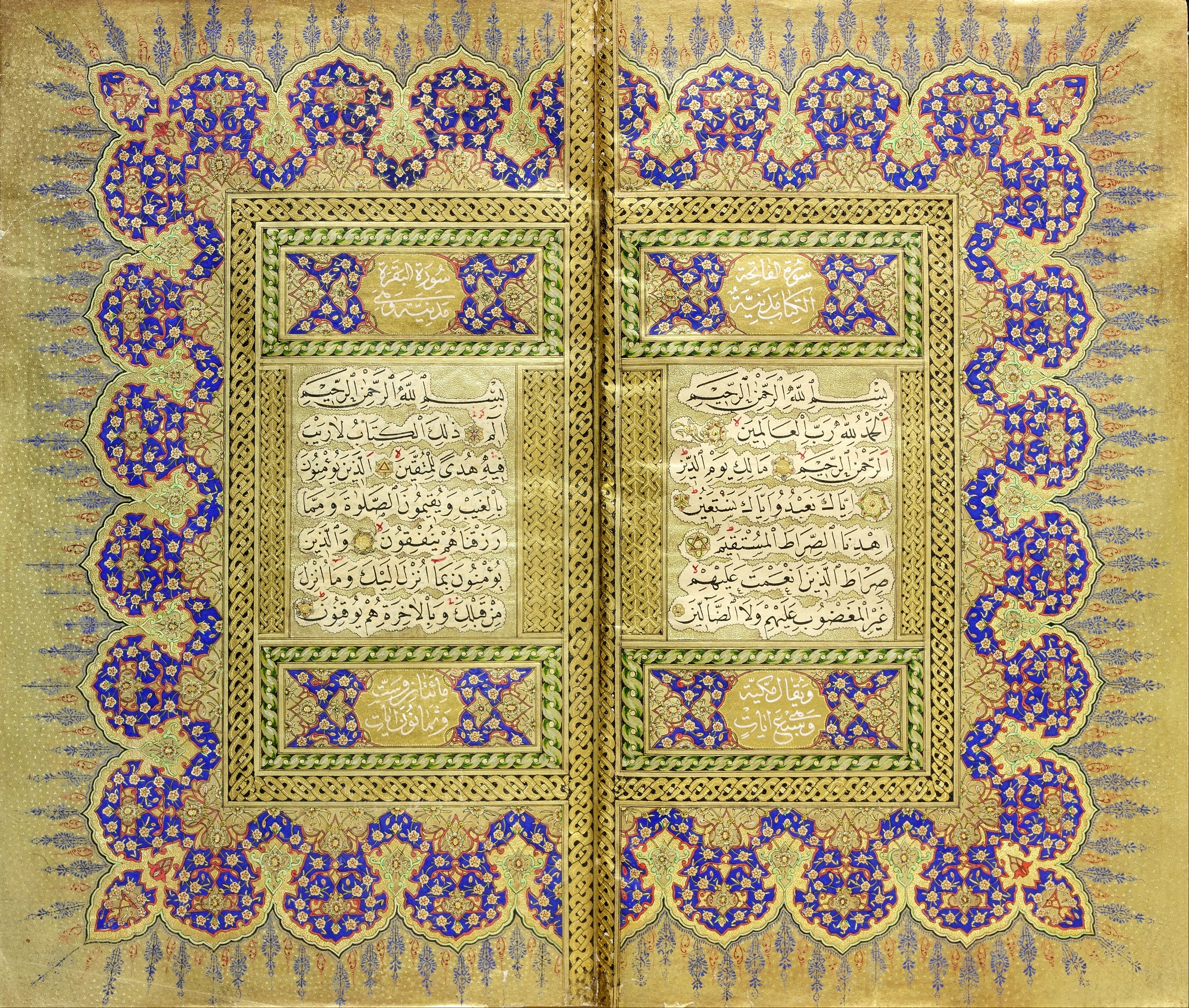
Naskh script by Mehmed Şevkî Efendi of the two introductory pages of the Quran

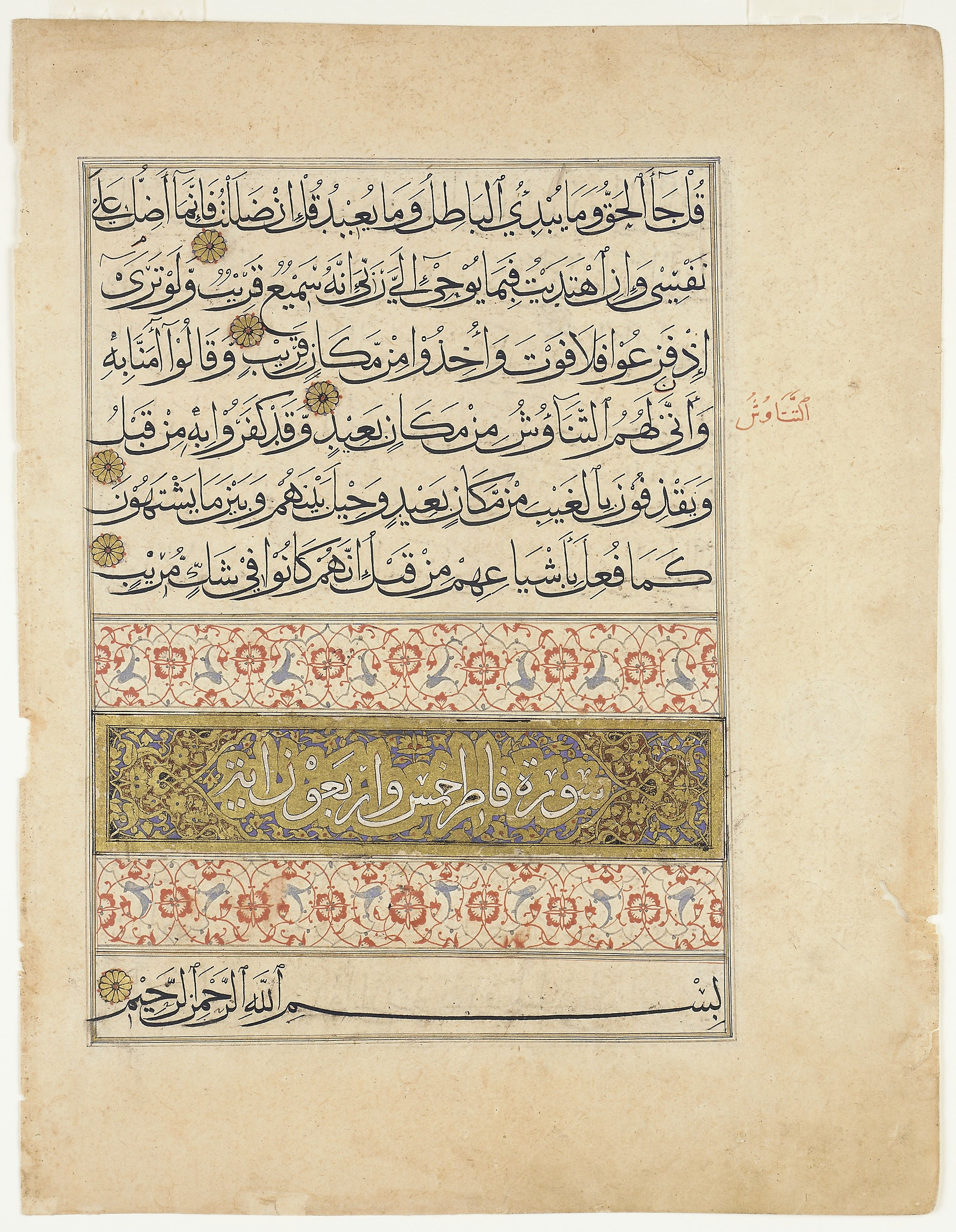
Muhaqqaq script in a 14th-century Quran from the Mamluk dynasty

The use of cursive scripts coexisted with Kufic, and historically cursive was commonly used for informal purposes. Naskh first appeared within the first century of the Islamic calendar. Naskh translates to "copying", as it became the standard for transcribing books and manuscripts. The script is the most ubiquitous among other styles, used in the Quran, official decrees, and private correspondence. It became the basis of modern Arabic print.

Kufic is commonly believed to predate naskh, but historians have traced the two scripts as coexisting long before their codification by ibn Muqla, as the two served different purposes. Kufi was used primarily in decoration, while Naskh served for everyday scribal use.

=== Thuluth ===
A digital rendering of the Bismillah in an 18th-century Islamic calligraphy from the Ottoman region, Thuluth script

Thuluth was developed during the 15th century and slowly refined by Ottoman calligraphers including Mustafa Râkim, Shaykh Hamdallah, and others, till it became what it is today. Letters in this script have long vertical lines with broad spacing. The name, meaning "one third", may possibly be a reference to the x-height, which is one-third of the 'alif, or to the fact that the pen used to write the vowels and ornaments is one third the width of that used in writing the letters.

=== Reqāʿ ===
Reqāʿ is a handwriting style similar to thuluth. It first appeared in the 10th century. The shape is simple with short strokes and small flourishes. Yaqut al-Musta'simi was one of the calligraphers who employed this style. The Arab, Ibn al-Bawwab is actually believed to have created this script.

=== Muhaqqaq ===
Muhaqqaq is a majestic style used by accomplished calligraphers, and is a variation of thuluth. Along with thuluth, it was considered one of the most beautiful scripts, as well as one of the most difficult to execute. Muhaqqaq was commonly used during the Mamluk era, but its use became largely restricted to short phrases, such as the basmallah, from the 18th century onward.

=== Regional styles ===
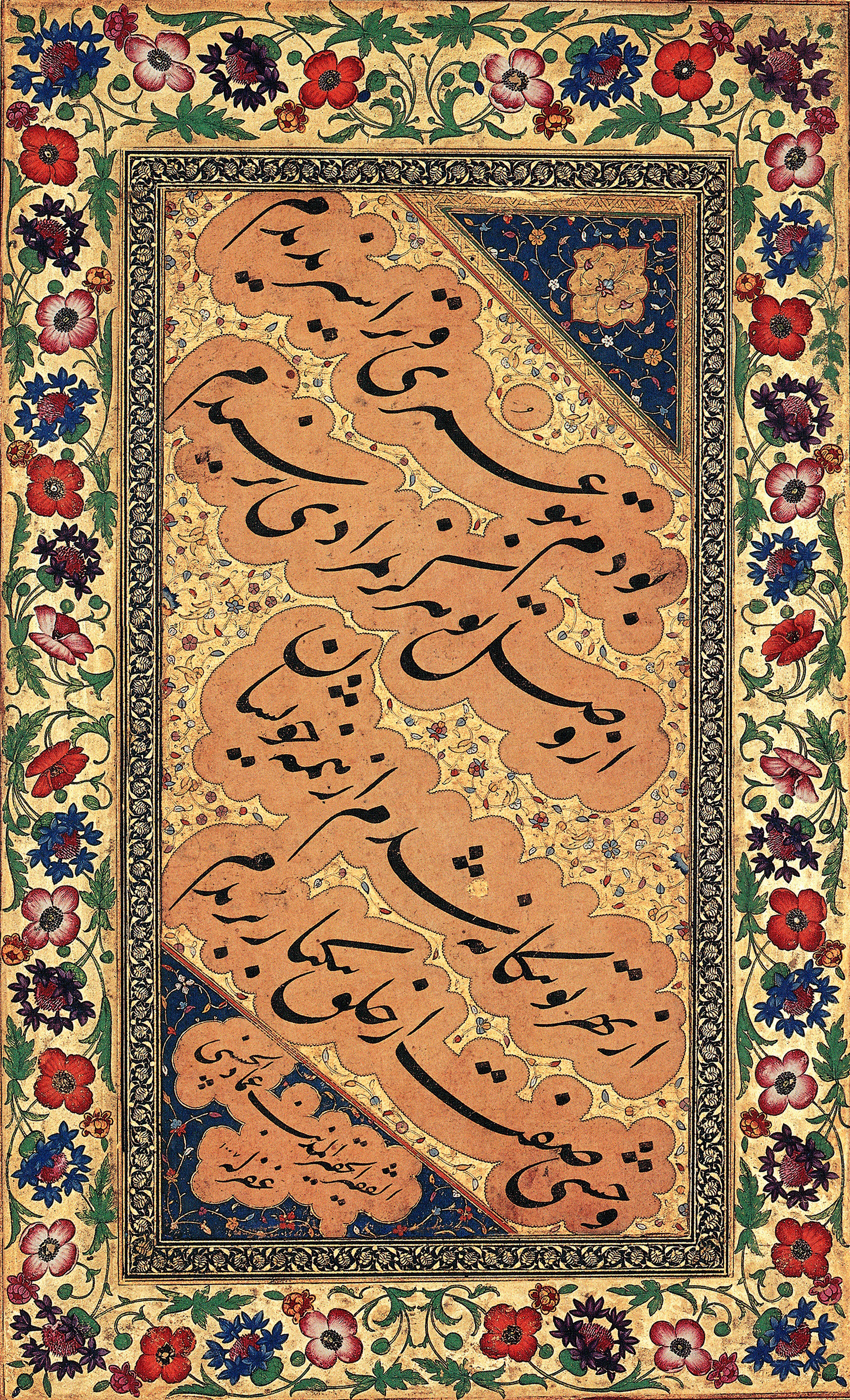
Nasta'liq calligraphy of a Persian poem by Mir Emad Hassani, perhaps the most celebrated Persian calligrapher

With the spread of Islam, the Arabic script was established in a vast geographic area with many regions developing their own unique styles. From the 14th century onward, other cursive styles began to develop in Turkey, Persia, and China.

1. Maghrebi scripts developed from Kufic letters in the Maghreb (North Africa) and al-Andalus (Iberia), Maghrebi scripts are traditionally written with a pointed tip (القلم المذبب), producing a line of even thickness. Within the Maghrebi family, there are different styles including the cursive mujawher and the ceremonial mabsut.
  1. Sudani scripts developed in Biled as-Sudan (the West African Sahel) and can be considered a subcategory of Maghrebi scripts
2. Diwani is a cursive style of Arabic calligraphy developed during the reign of the early Ottoman Turks in the 16th and early 17th centuries. It was invented by Housam Roumi, and reached its height of popularity under Süleyman I the Magnificent (1520–1566). Spaces between letters are often narrow, and lines ascend upwards from right to left. Larger variations called djali are filled with dense decorations of dots and diacritical marks in the space between, giving it a compact appearance. Diwani is difficult to read and write due to its heavy stylization and became the ideal script for writing court documents as it ensured confidentiality and prevented forgery.
3. Nasta'liq is a cursive style originally devised to write the Persian language for literary and non-Quranic works. Nasta'liq is thought to be a later development of the naskh and the earlier ta'liq script used in Iran, rapidly gaining popularity as a script in South Asia. The name ta'liq means "hanging", and refers to the slightly sloped quality of lines of text in this script. Letters have short vertical strokes with broad and sweeping horizontal strokes. The shapes are deep, hook-like, and have high contrast. A variant called Shikasteh was developed in the 17th century for more formal contexts.
4. Sini is a style developed in China. The shape is greatly influenced by Chinese calligraphy, using a horsehair brush instead of the standard reed pen. A famous modern calligrapher in this tradition is Hajji Noor Deen Mi Guangjiang.

=== Modern ===
In the post-colonial era, artists working in North Africa and the Middle East transformed Arabic calligraphy into a modern art movement, known as the Hurufiyya movement. Artists working in this style use calligraphy as a graphic element within contemporary artwork.

The term, hurufiyya is derived from the Arabic term, harf for letter. Traditionally, the term was charged with Sufi intellectual and esoteric meaning. It is an explicit reference to a medieval system of teaching involving political theology and lettrism. In this theology, letters were seen as primordial signifiers and manipulators of the cosmos.

Hurufiyya artists blended Western art concepts with an artistic identity and sensibility drawn from their own culture and heritage. These artists integrated Islamic visual traditions, especially calligraphy, and elements of modern art into syncretic contemporary compositions. Although hurufiyyah artists struggled to find their own individual dialogue within the context of nationalism, they also worked towards an aesthetic that transcended national boundaries and represented a broader affiliation with an Islamic identity.

The hurufiyya artistic style as a movement most likely began in North Africa c. 1955 with the work of Ibrahim el-Salahi. However, the use of calligraphy in modern artworks appears to have emerged independently in various Islamic states. Artists working in this were often unaware of other hurufiyya artists's works, allowing for different manifestations of the style to emerge in different regions. In Sudan, for instance, artworks include both Islamic calligraphy and West African motifs.

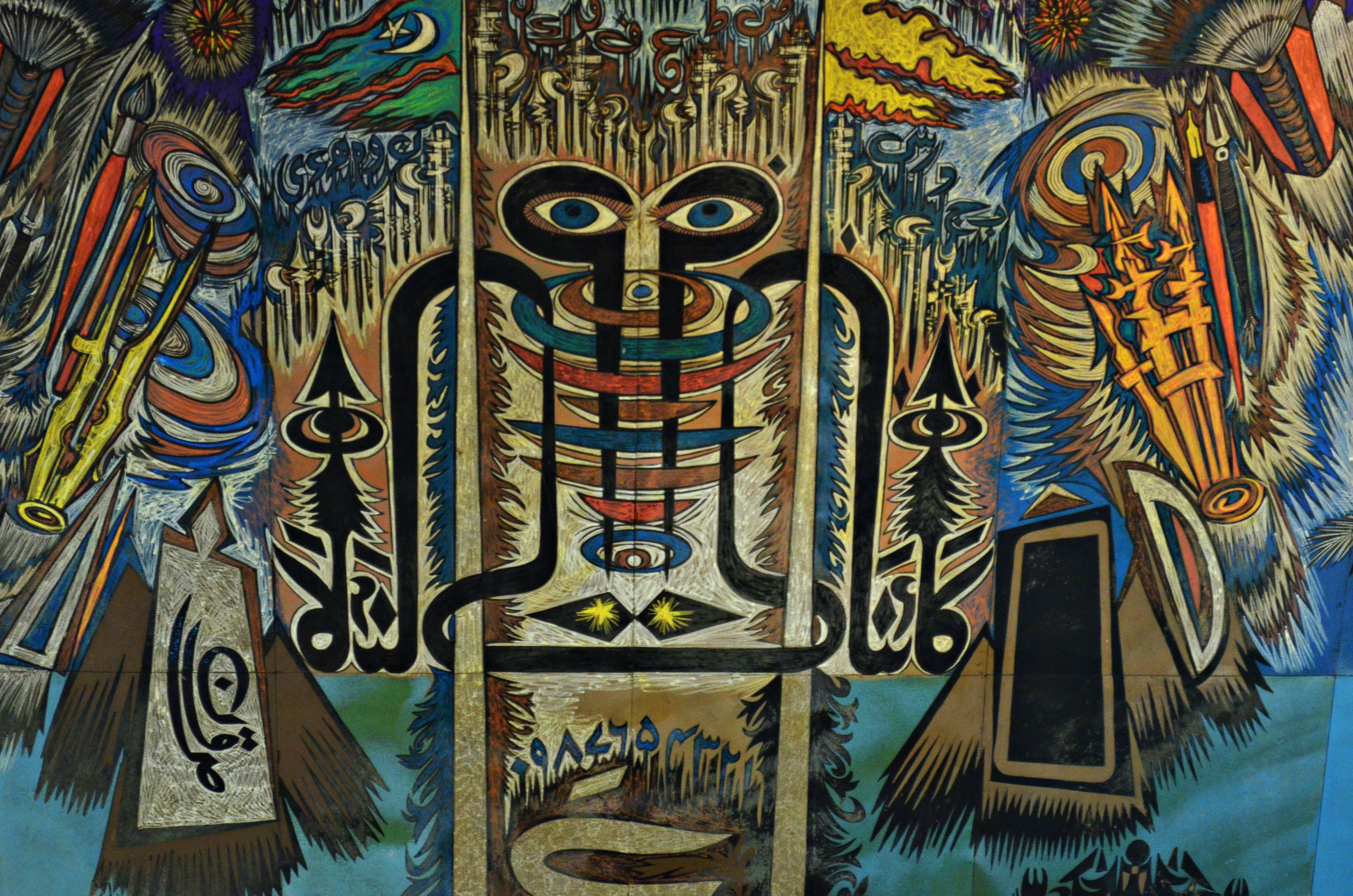
The roof of Frere Hall, Karachi, Pakistan, c. 1986. Mural by artist, Sadequain Naqqash integrates calligraphy elements into a modern artwork.

The hurufiyya art movement was not confined to painters and included artists working in a variety of media. One example is the Jordanian ceramicist, Mahmoud Taha who combined the traditional aesthetics of calligraphy with skilled craftsmanship. Although not affiliated with the hurufiyya movement, the contemporary artist Shirin Neshat integrates Arabic text into her black-and-white photography, creating contrast and duality. In Iraq, the movement was known as Al Bu'd al Wahad (or the One Dimension Group)", and in Iran, it was known as the Saqqa-Khaneh movement.

Western art has influenced Arabic calligraphy in other ways, with forms such as calligraffiti, which is the use of calligraphy in public art to make politico-social messages or to ornament public buildings and spaces. Notable Islamic calligraffiti artists include: Yazan Halwani active in Lebanon, el Seed working in France and Tunisia, Ayad Alkadhi working in New York, and Caiand A1one in Tehran.

In 2017 the Sultanate of Oman unveiled the Mushaf Muscat, an interactive calligraphic Quran following supervision and support from the Omani Ministry of Endowments and Religious Affairs, a voting member of the Unicode Consortium.

== Objects ==
=== Muraqqa ===
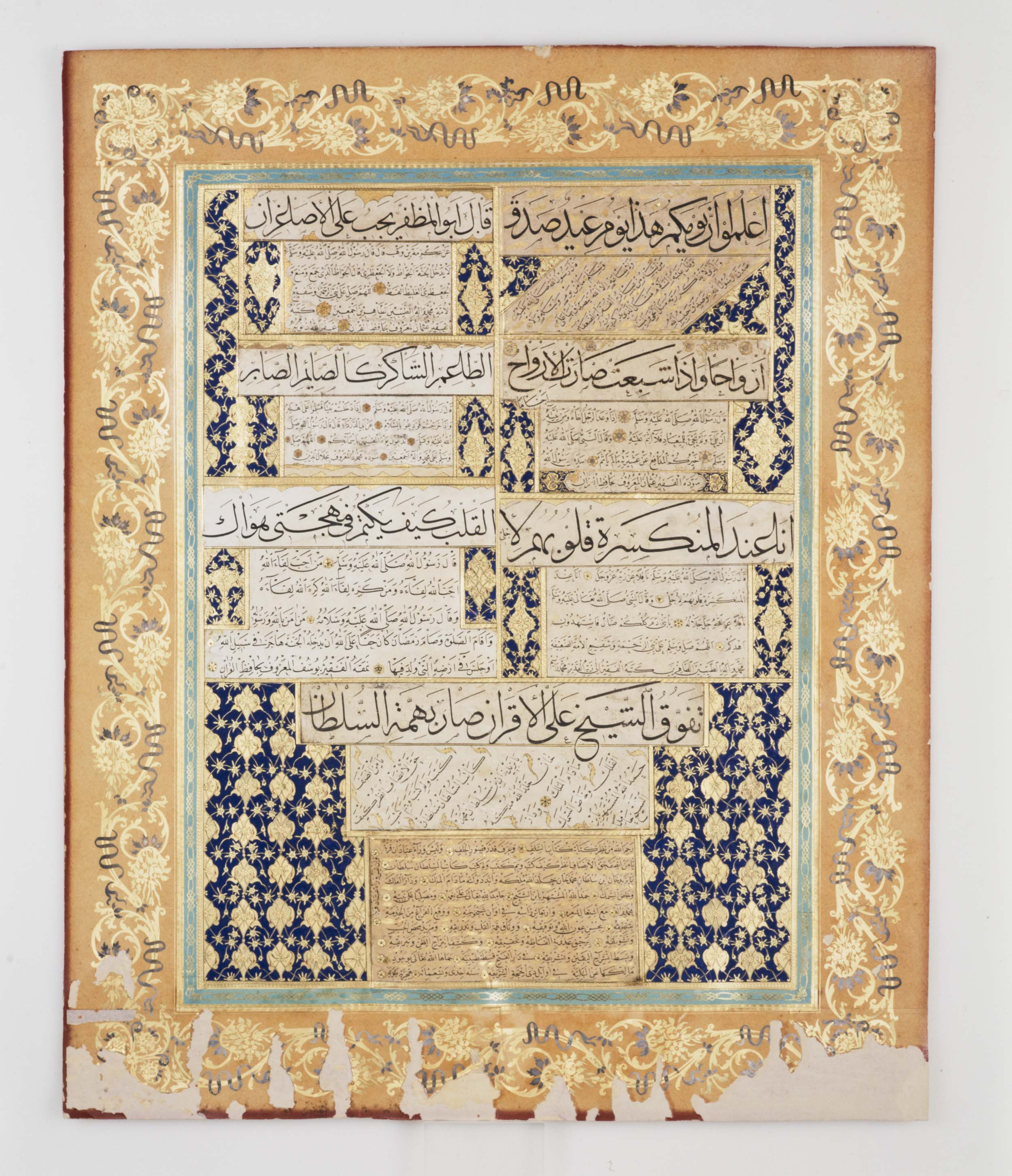
Muraqqa page combining eight separate pieces of calligraphy by five Ottoman calligraphers (Sheikh Hamdullah, Hâfiz Osman, Yusuf Efendi (d. 1729), Mehmed Rasim and Mahmud Celaleddin Efendi)

A muraqqa is an album in book form containing Islamic miniature paintings and specimens of Islamic calligraphy, normally from several different sources. The album was popular among collectors in the Islamic world, and by the later 16th century became the predominant format for miniature painting in Safavid Iran, the Mughal Empire, and the Ottoman Empire. The album largely replaced the full-scale illustrated manuscript of classics of Persian poetry, which had been the typical vehicle for the finest miniature painters up to that time.

An album could be compiled over time, page by page, and often included miniatures and pages of calligraphy from older books that were broken up for this purpose. This allowed a wider circle of collectors access to the best painters and calligraphers, although muraqqat were also compiled by, or presented to, shahs and emperors. The earliest muraqqa were of pages of calligraphy only; it was at the court in Herat of the Timurid prince Baysunghur in the early 15th century that the form became important for miniature painting. The word muraqqa means "that which has been patched together" in Persian.

=== Tughra ===
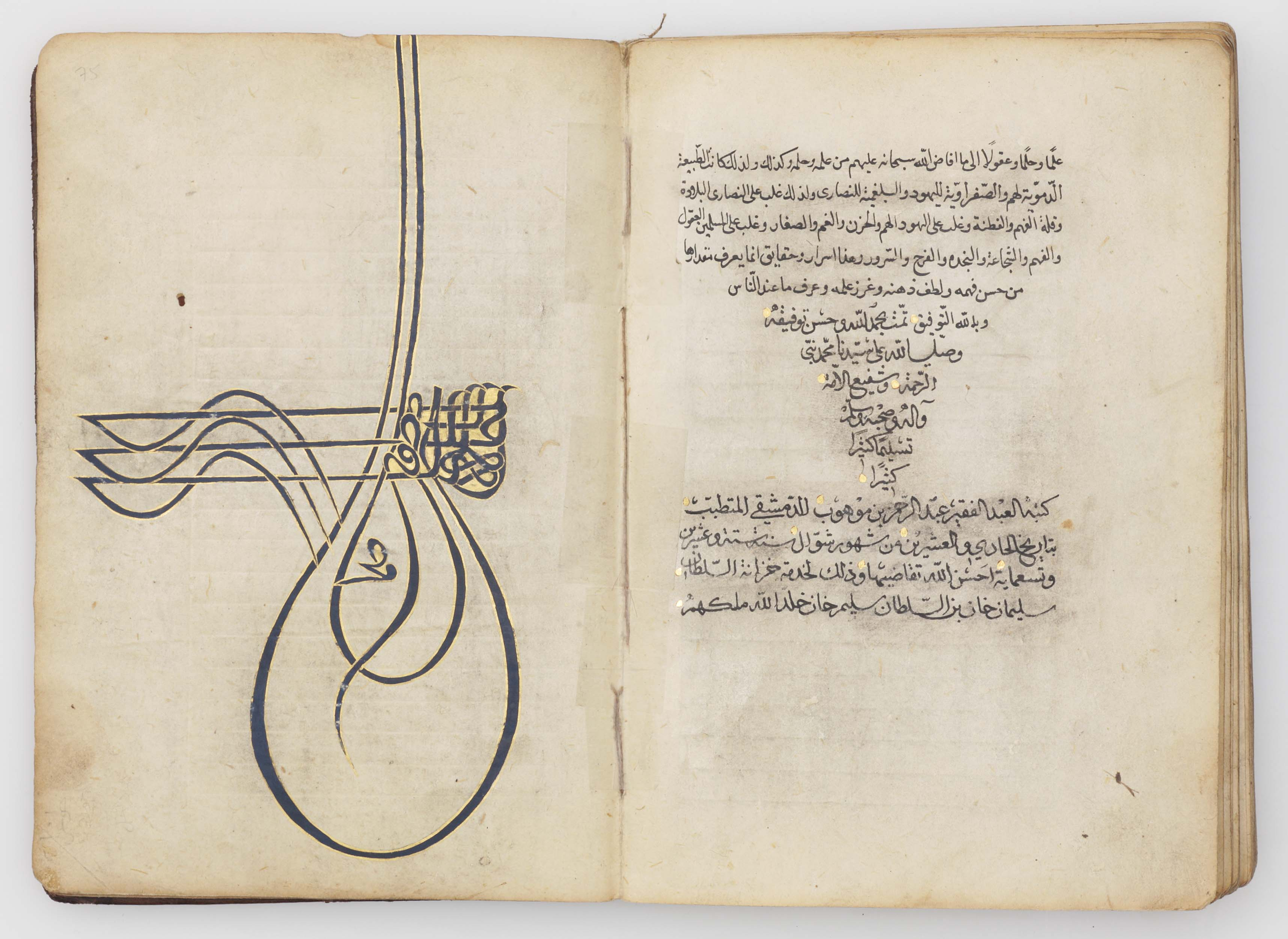
Manuscript with the tughra of Suleiman the Magnificent (left)

A tughra is a calligraphic monogram, seal or signature of a sultan that was affixed to all official documents and correspondence. Inspired by the tamgha, it was also carved on his seal and stamped on the coins minted during his reign. Very elaborate decorated versions were created for important documents that were also works of art in the tradition of Ottoman illumination. The tughra was designed at the beginning of the sultan's reign and drawn by the court calligrapher or nişancı on written documents. The first tughra examples are from the 14th century.

Tughras served a purpose similar to the cartouche in ancient Egypt or the royal cypher of British monarchs. Every Ottoman sultan had his own individual tughra. They have also sometimes been used in other states, such as Qajar Iran, the Safavid Empire, the Crimean khanate, and the Khanate of Kazan. The Mughal "Tughra" was circular in shape.

=== Hilya ===
A hilya or hilye ("ornament") is a graphic art work which describes Muhammad's physical and moral qualities. It lays out calligraphy in a pattern. These let Muslims think about Muhammad's appearance and his spiritual qualities without using pictures.

Owning or reading a hilya art work was thought to protect people or their homes from disasters. So people carried them in pockets or displayed them on walls. They were seen as ways to create a personal connection with Muhammad. There was a standard way to lay out a hilya, based on the parts of a human body. This standard came from the work of the artist Hafız Osman. Later artists have made new designs and mixed in other kinds of art.

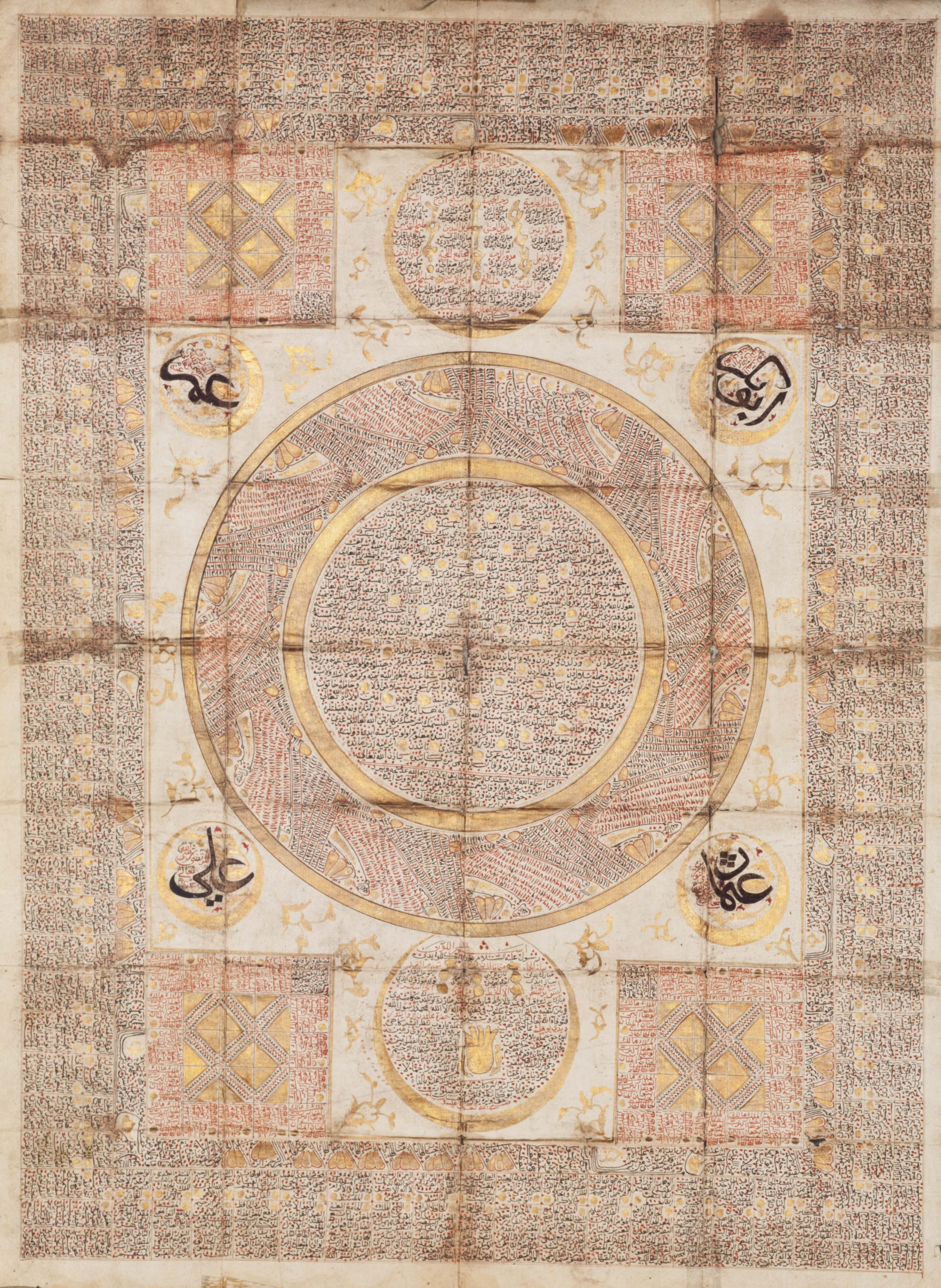
Hilya from 1712 that was folded and carried

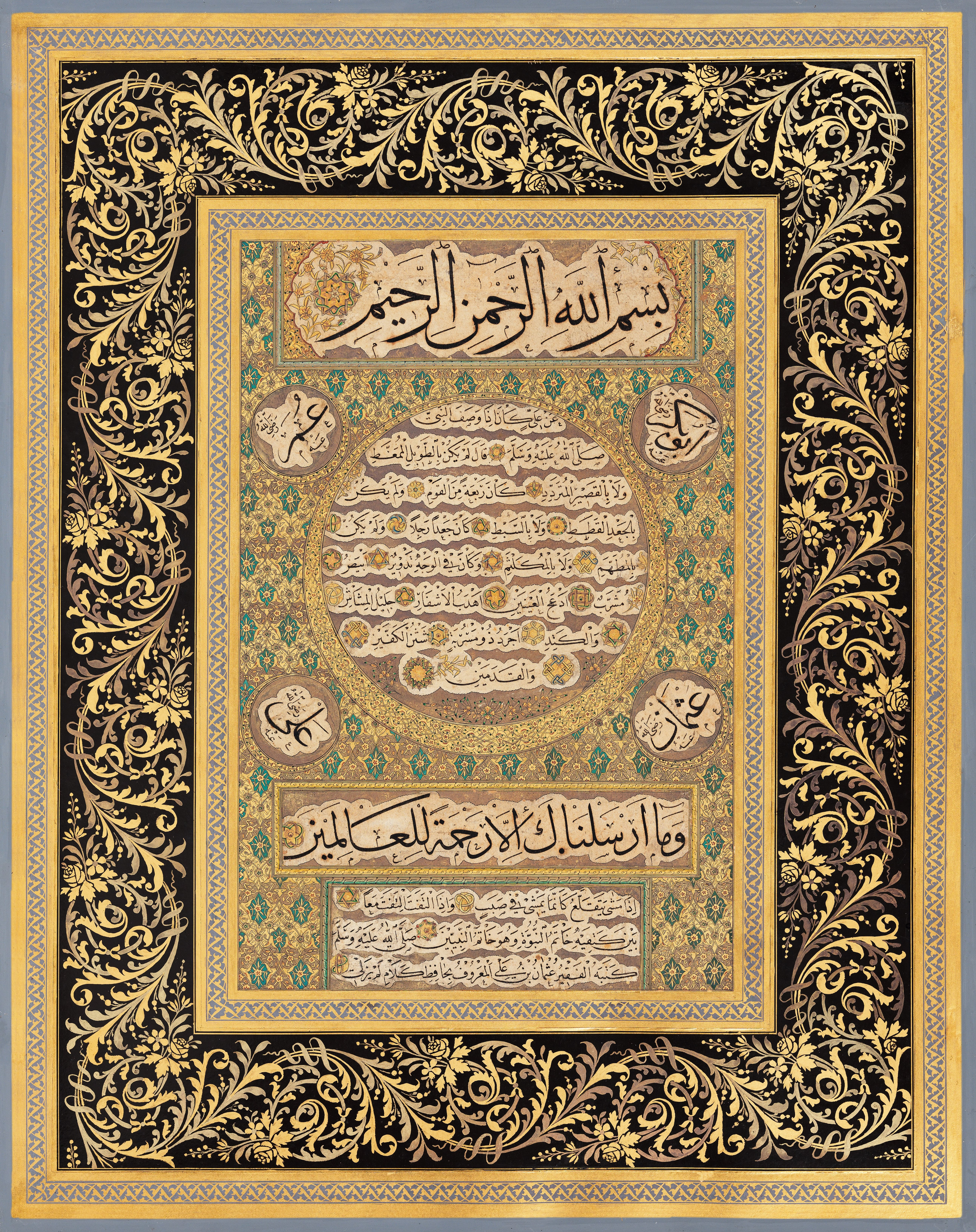
Hilya by Hafız Osman from around 1680

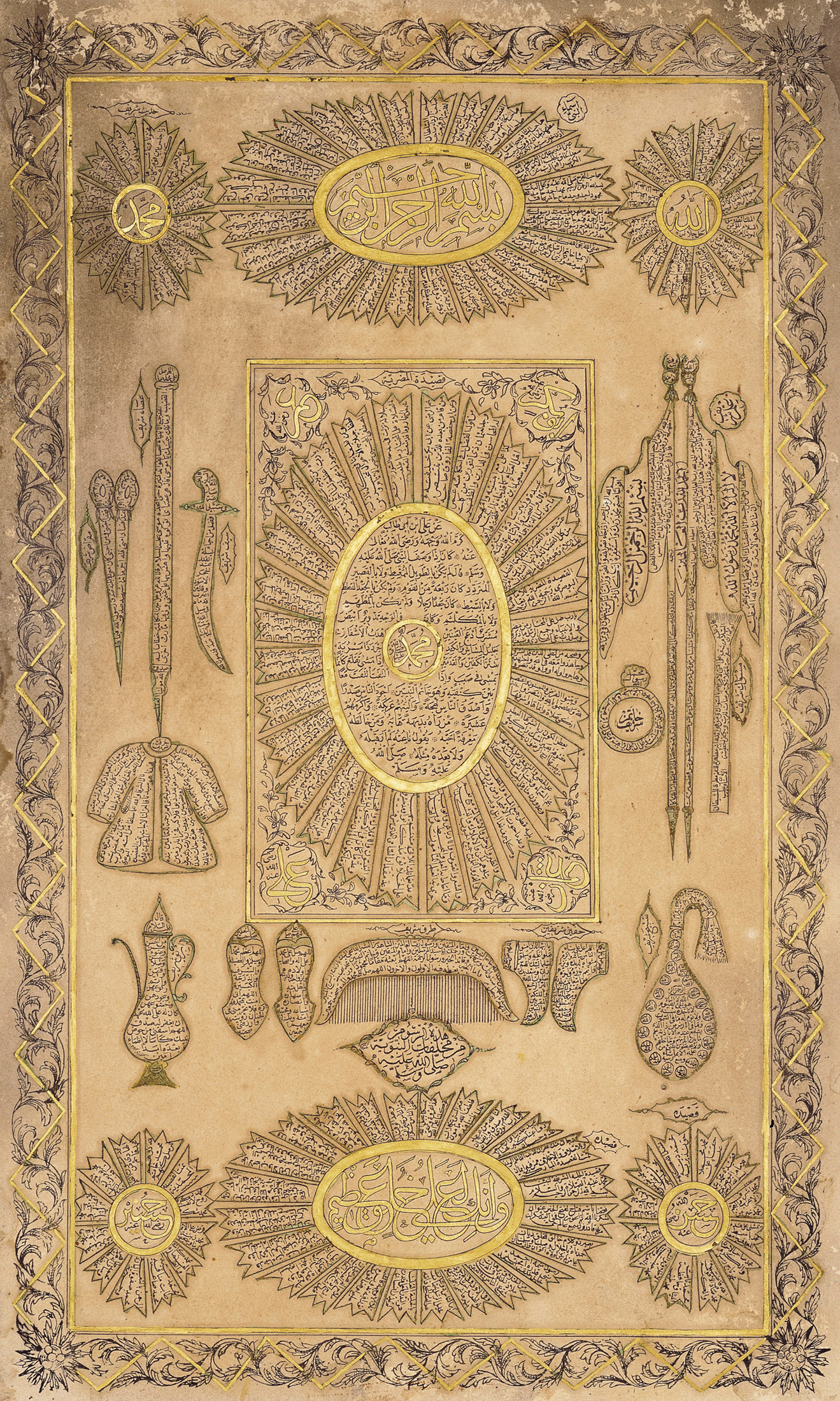
Hilya from the 19th century with text in the shape of relics of Muhammad

== Gallery ==
=== Kufic ===
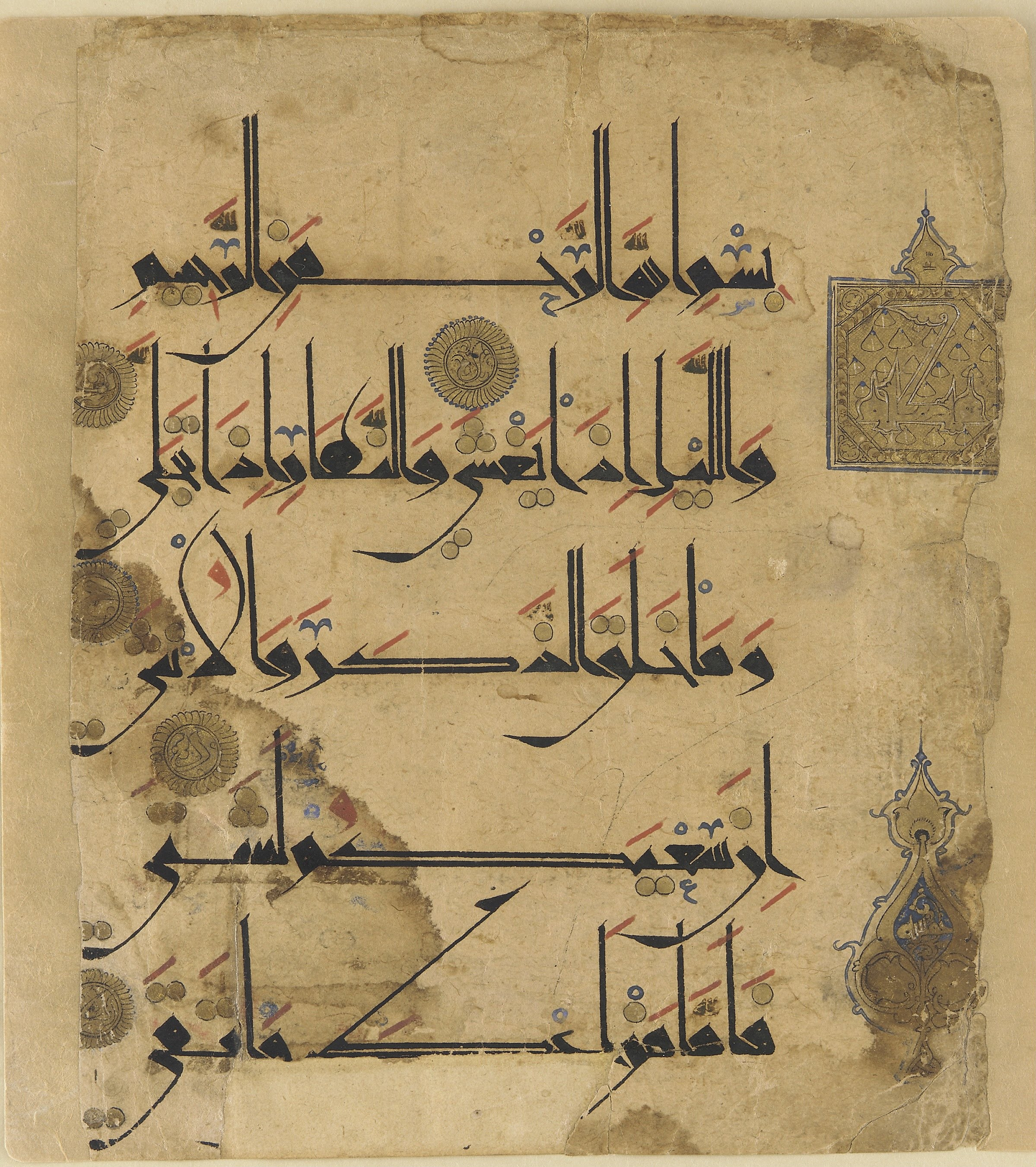
Kufic script in an 11th-century Quran

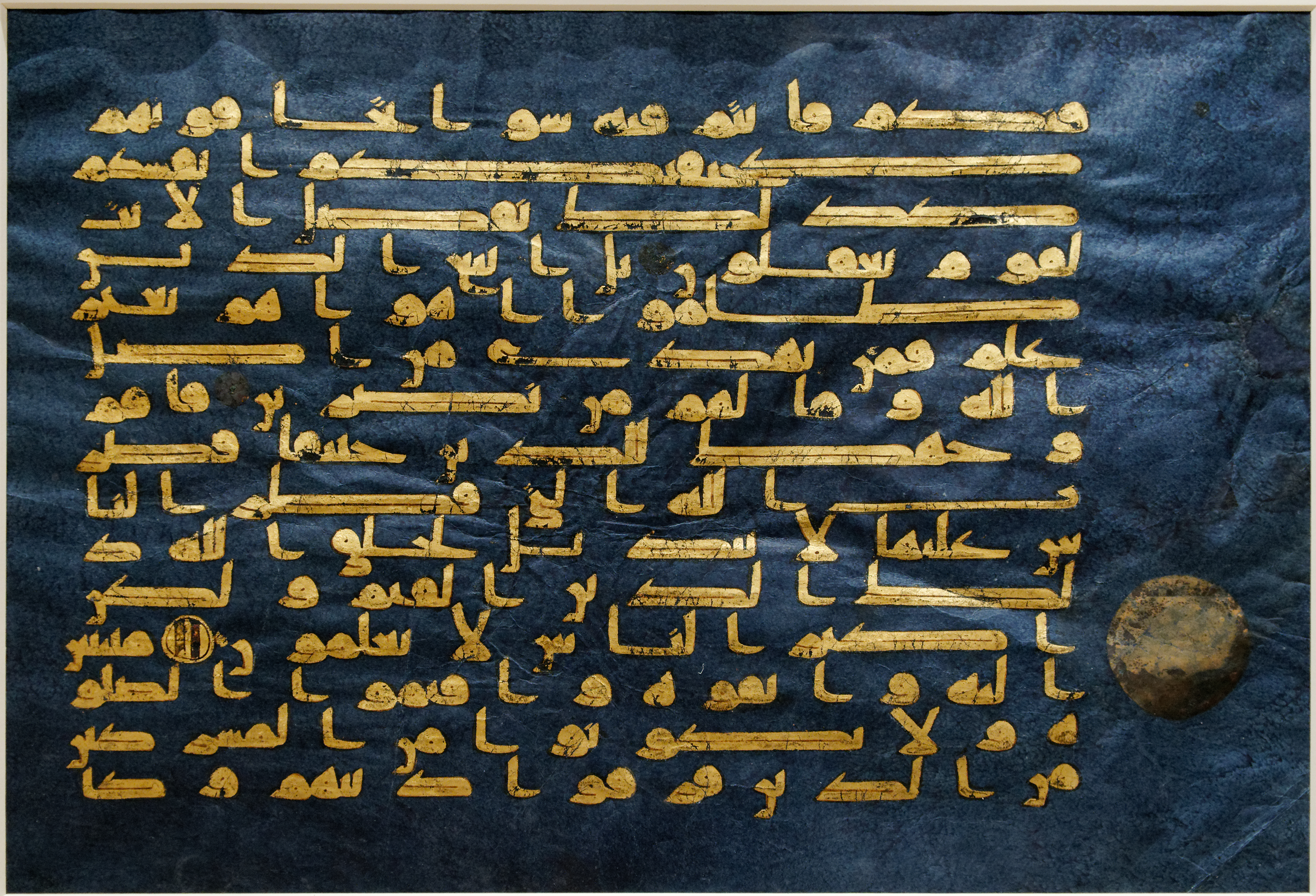
Maghrebi Kufic script in the 9th or 10th century Blue Quran

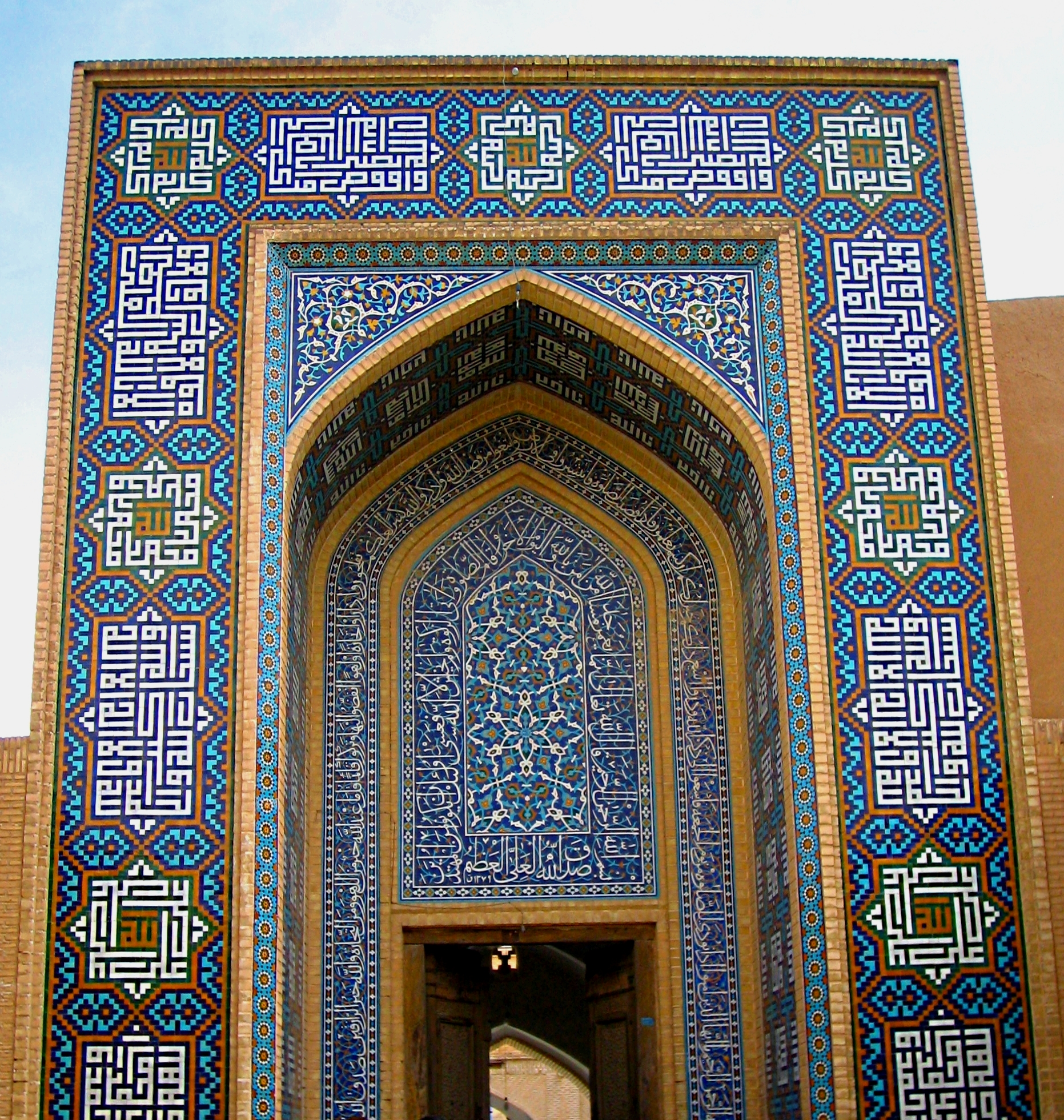
Square kufic tilework in Yazd, Iran

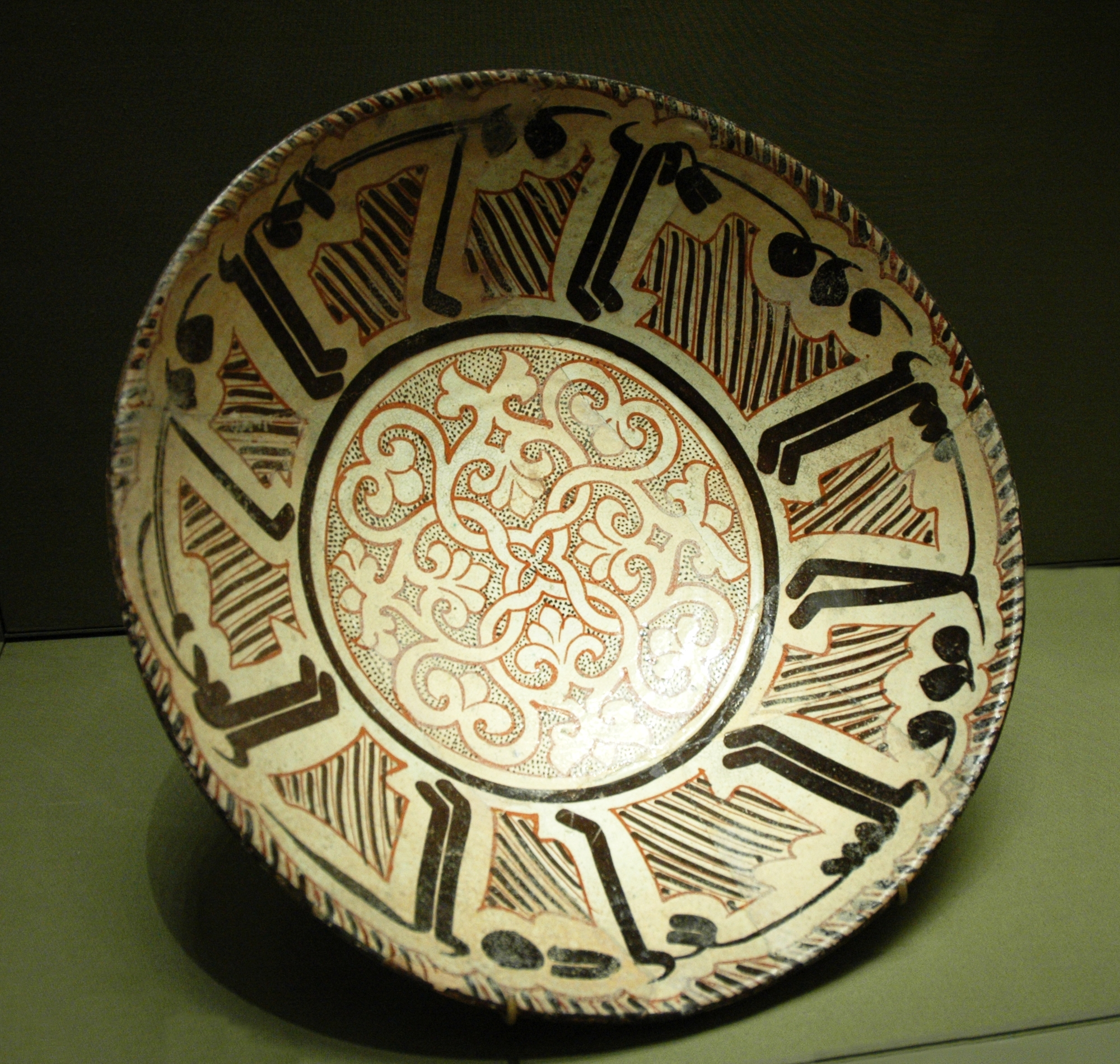
Under-glaze terracotta bowl from the 11th century Nishapur

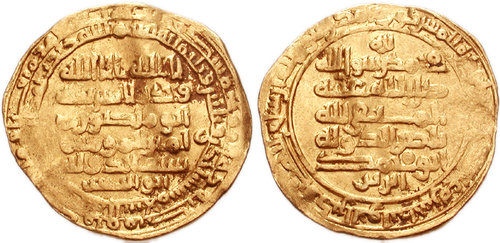
Gold dinar from 10th century Syria

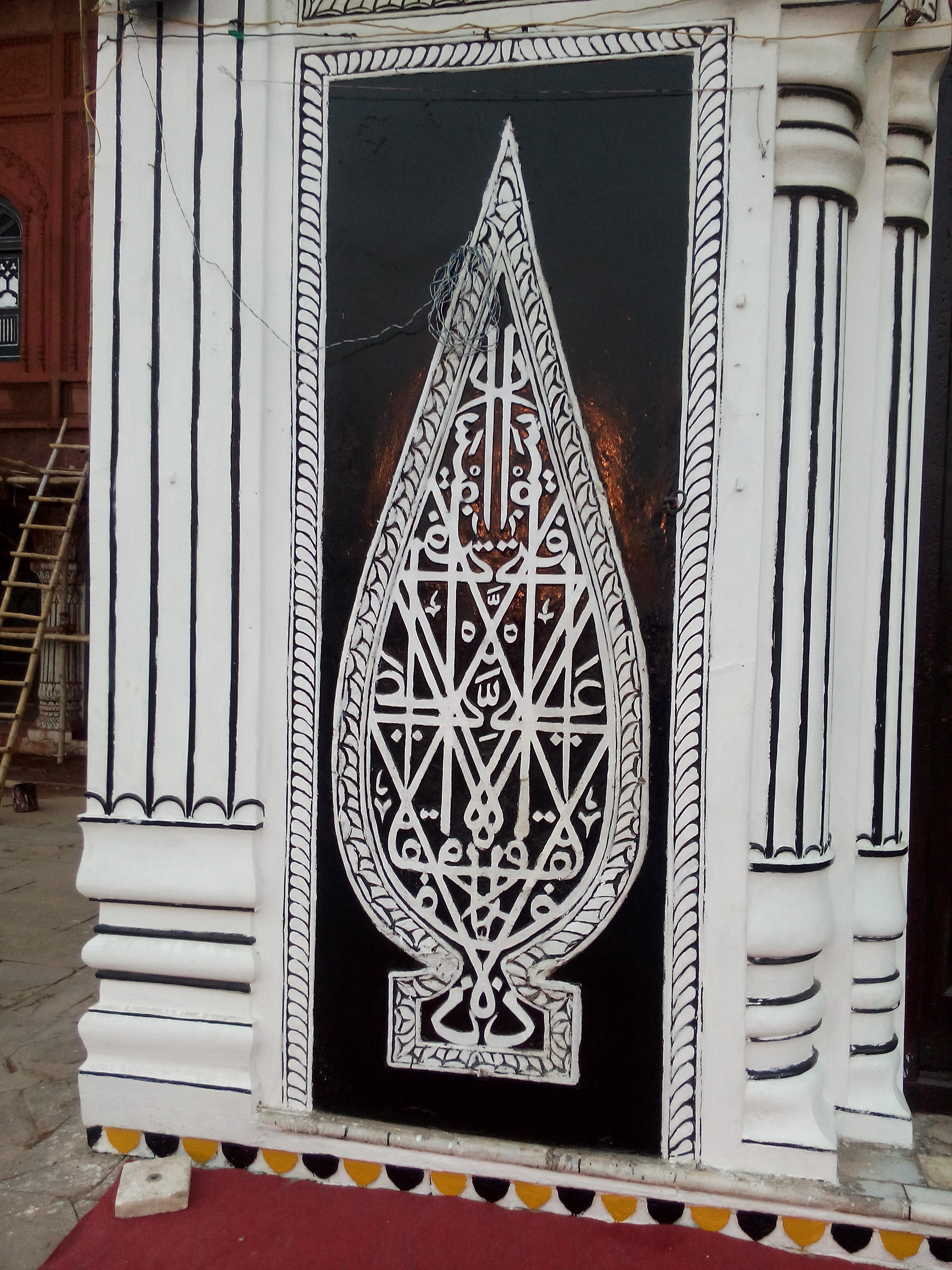
A Kufic calligraphy in Chota Imambara

=== Naskh and Thuluth ===
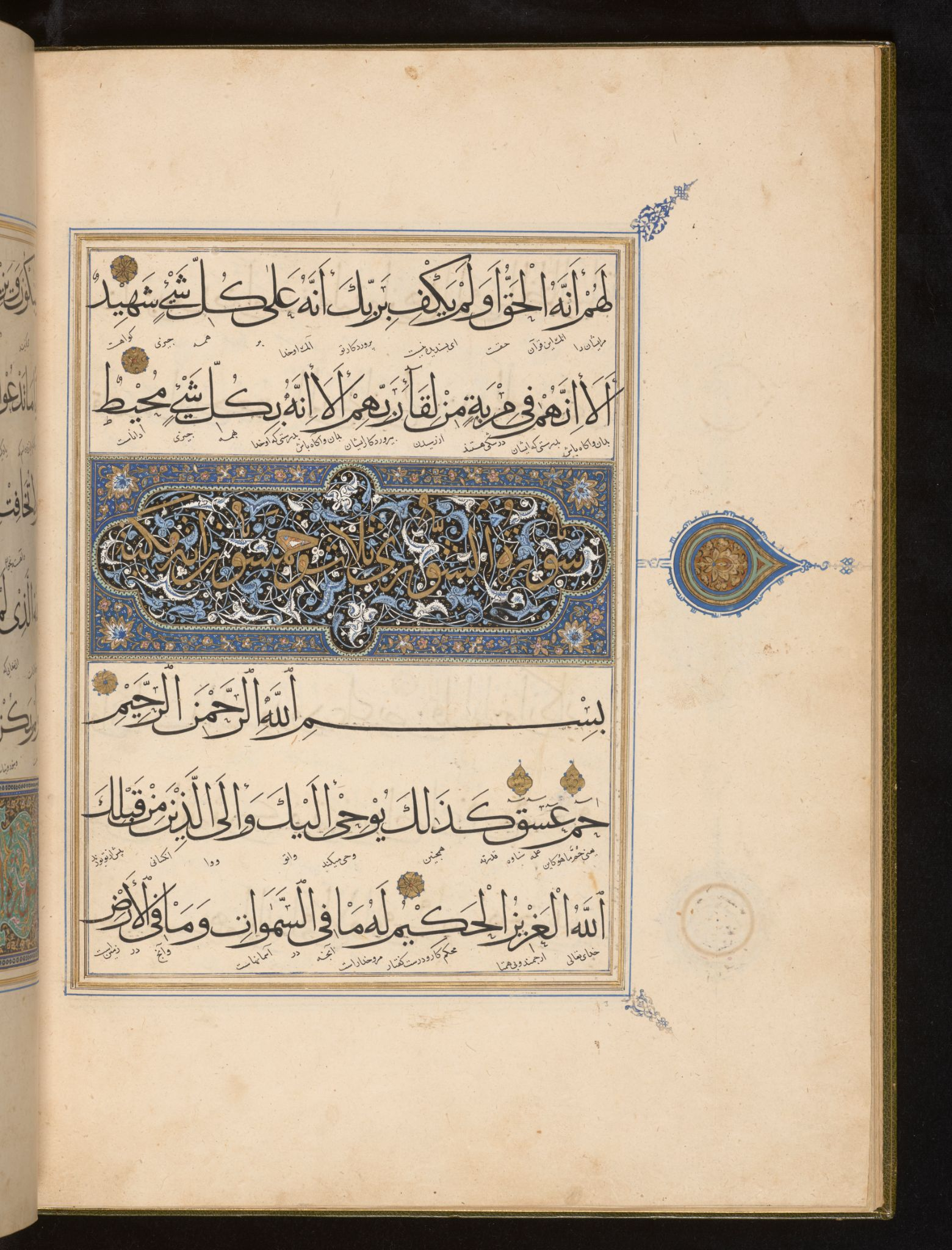
Muhaqqaq script in a 15th-century Quran from Turkey

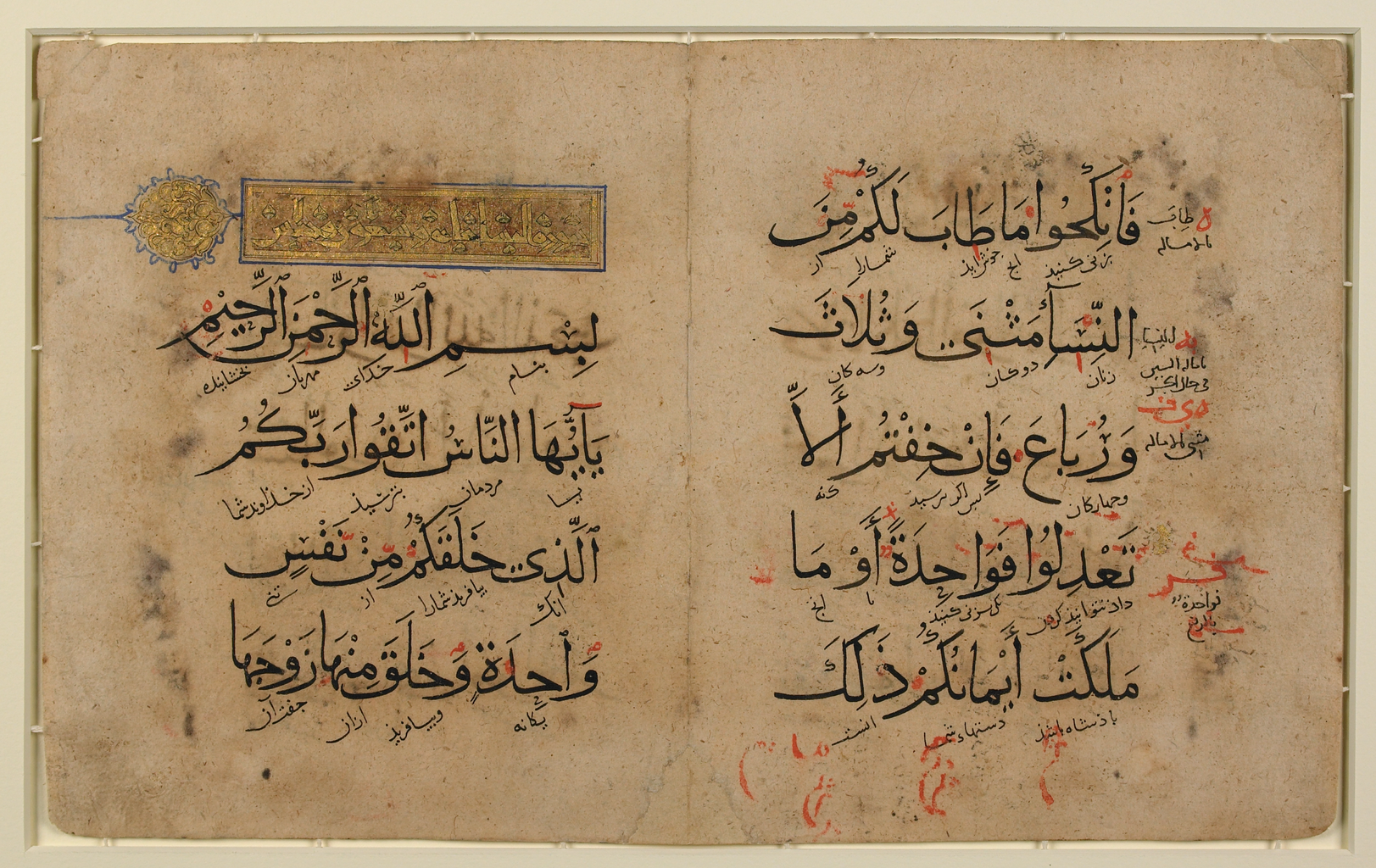
Muhaqqaq script in a 13th-century Quran

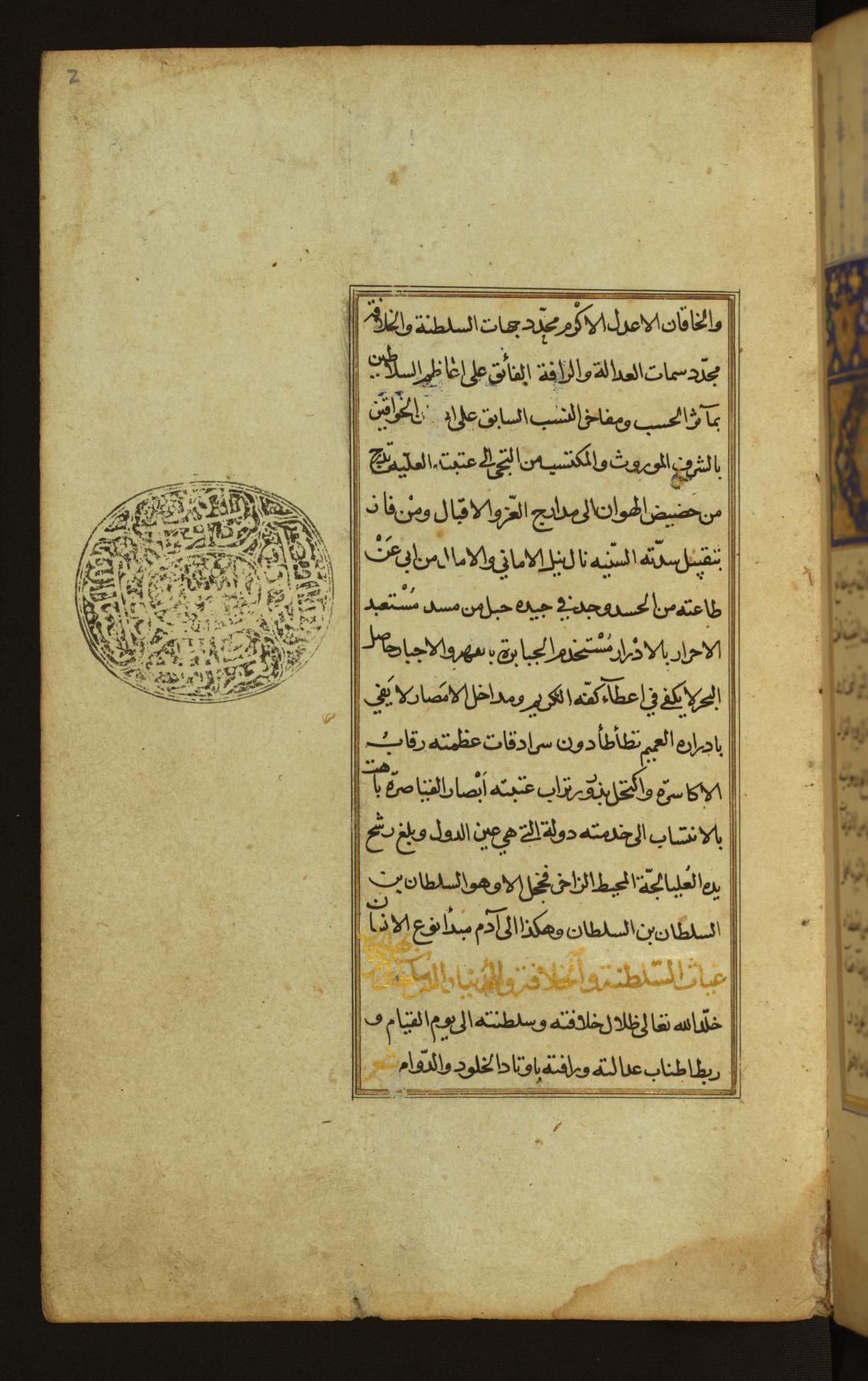
Naskh script in an early 16th-century Ottoman manuscript dedicated to Selim I

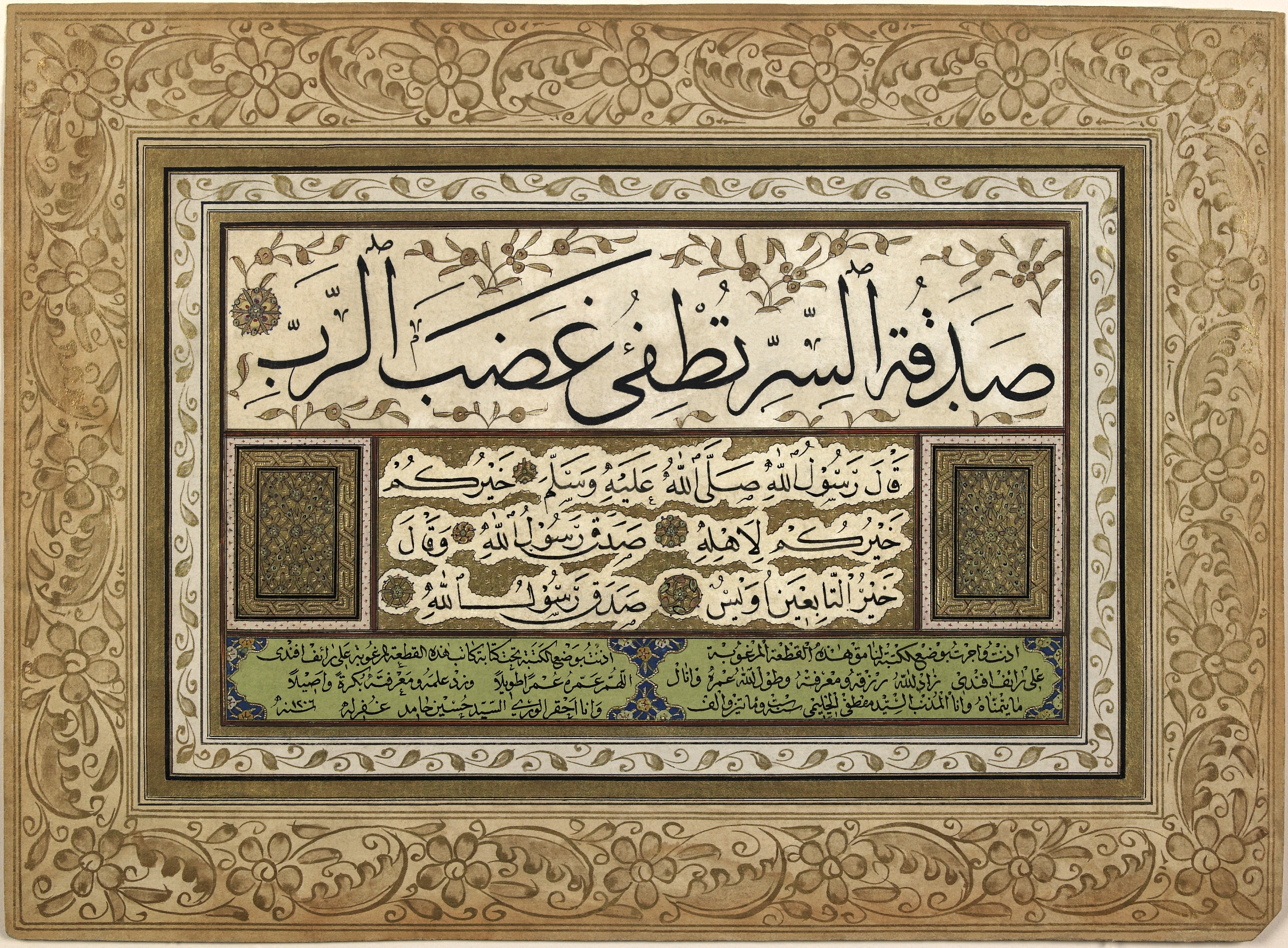
Diploma of competency in calligraphy, written with thuluth and naskh script

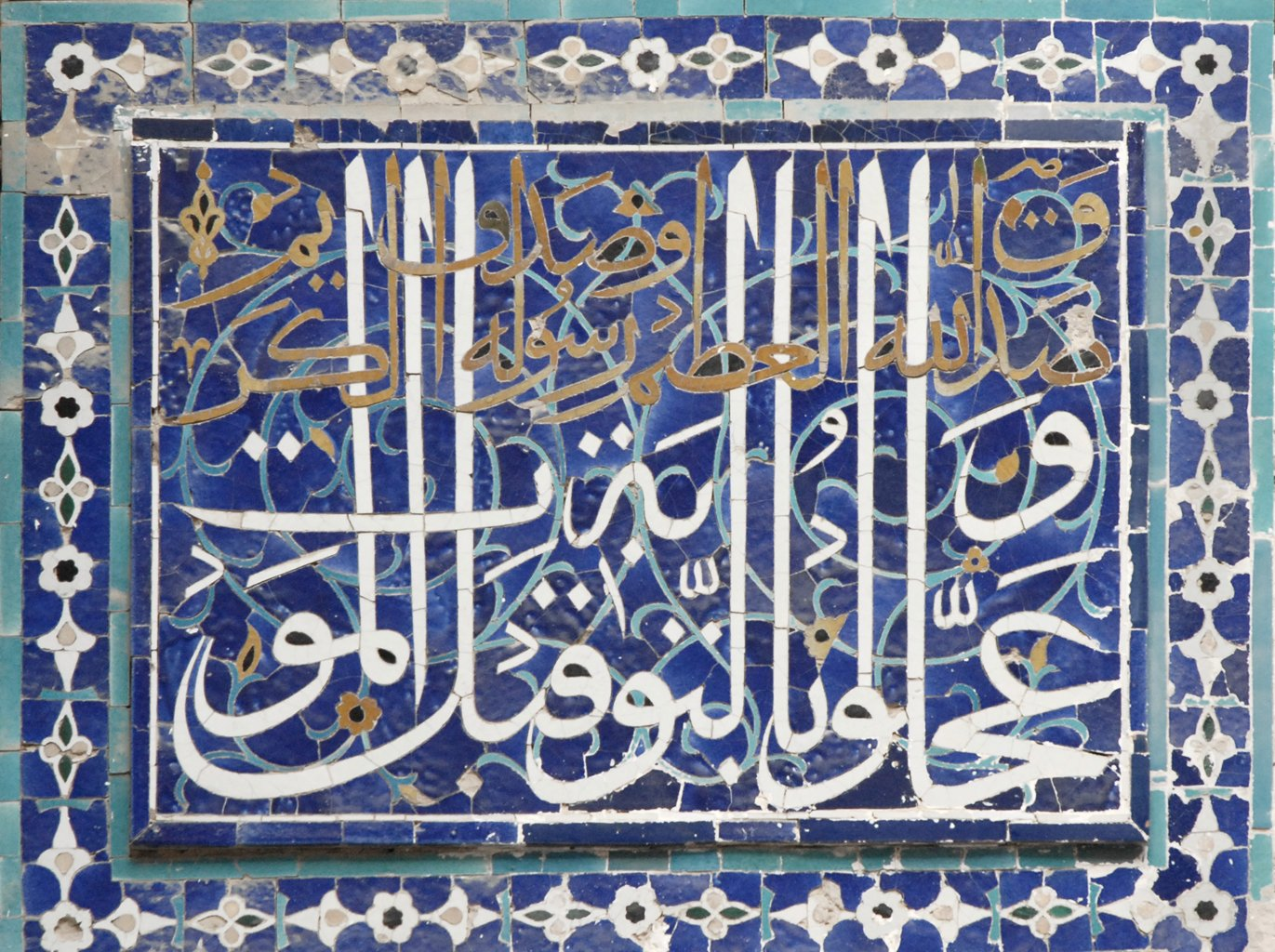
Thuluth script tile in Samarkand

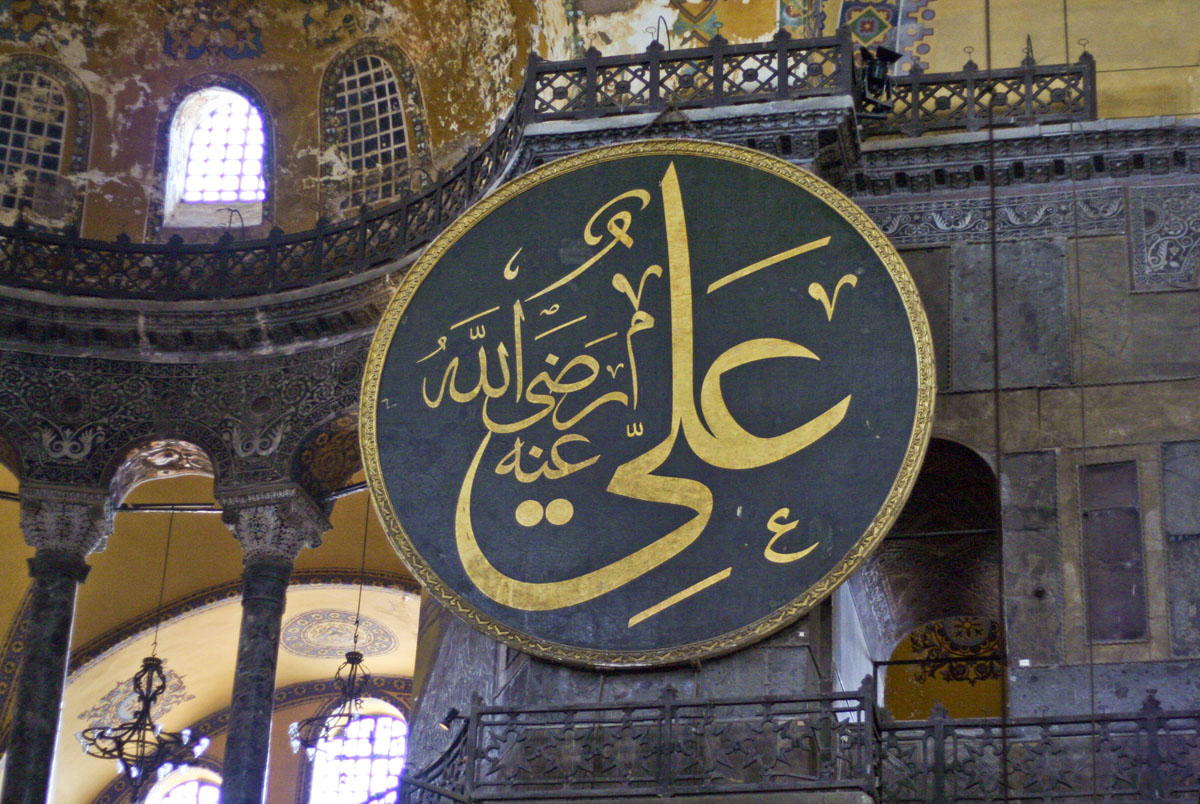
Calligraphy of Ali decorating Hagia Sophia

=== Regional varieties ===
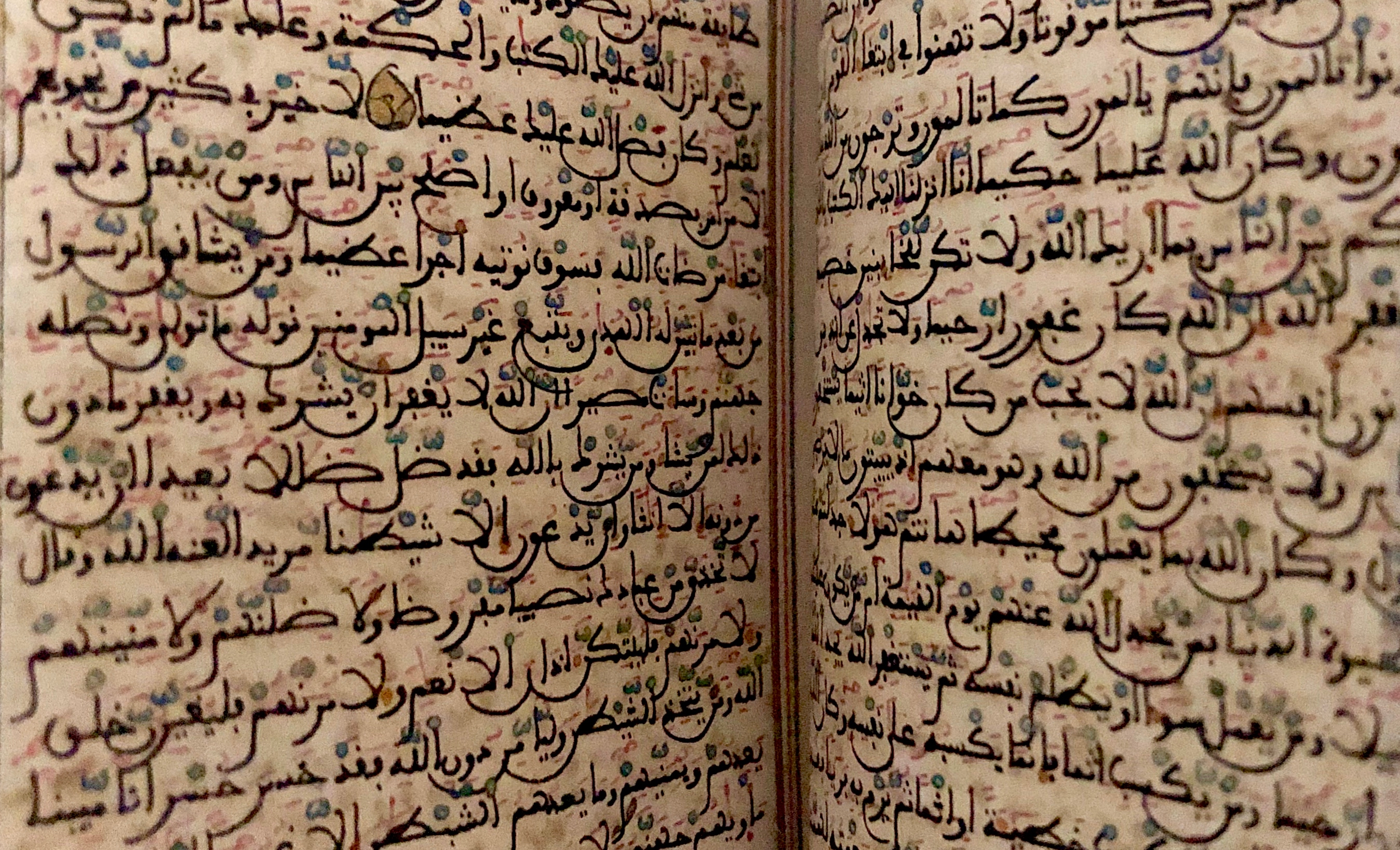
A Moroccan Quran in a mabsūt Maghrebi script

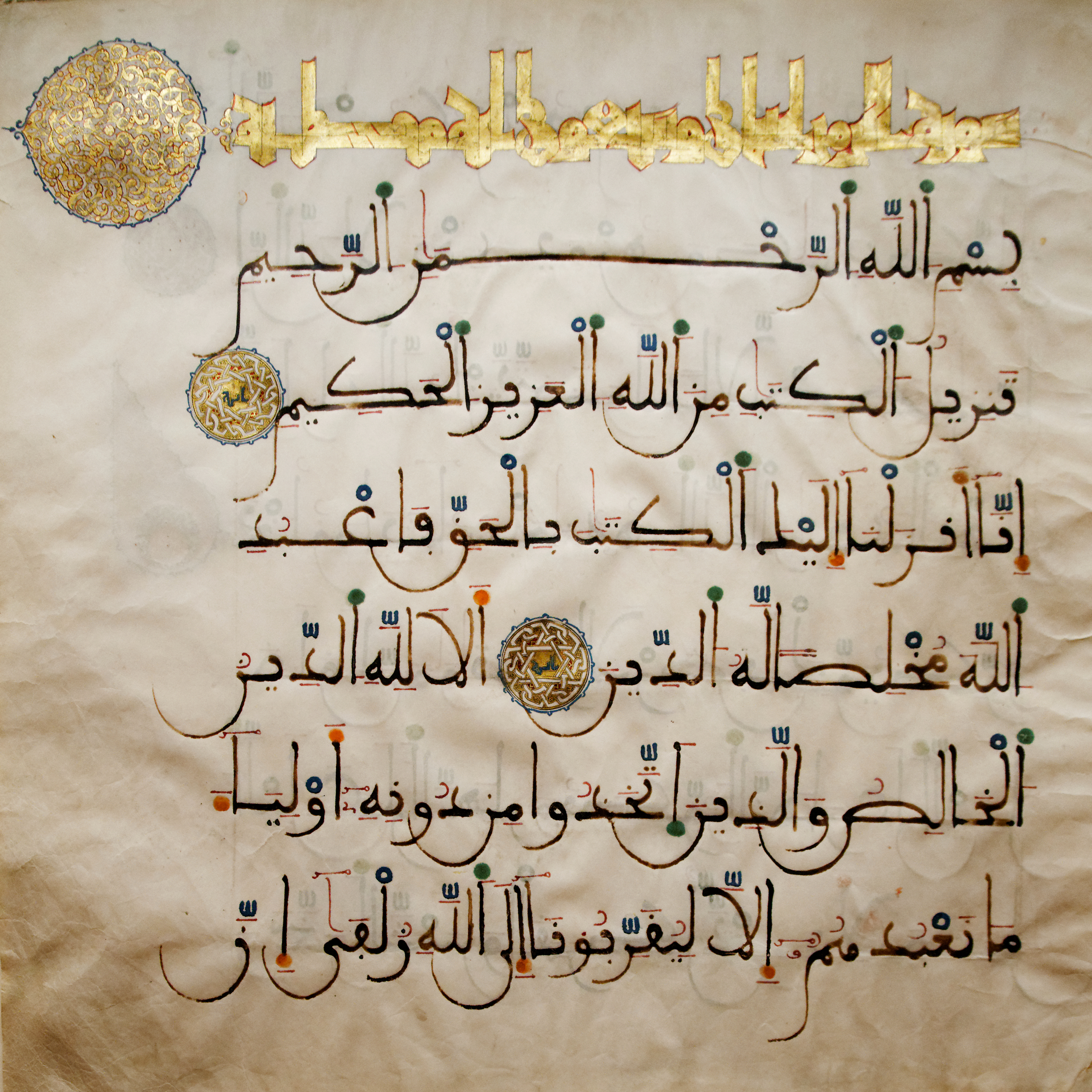
Surah "Az-Zumar" in an Andalusi script, from the Nasrid period in Al-Andalus

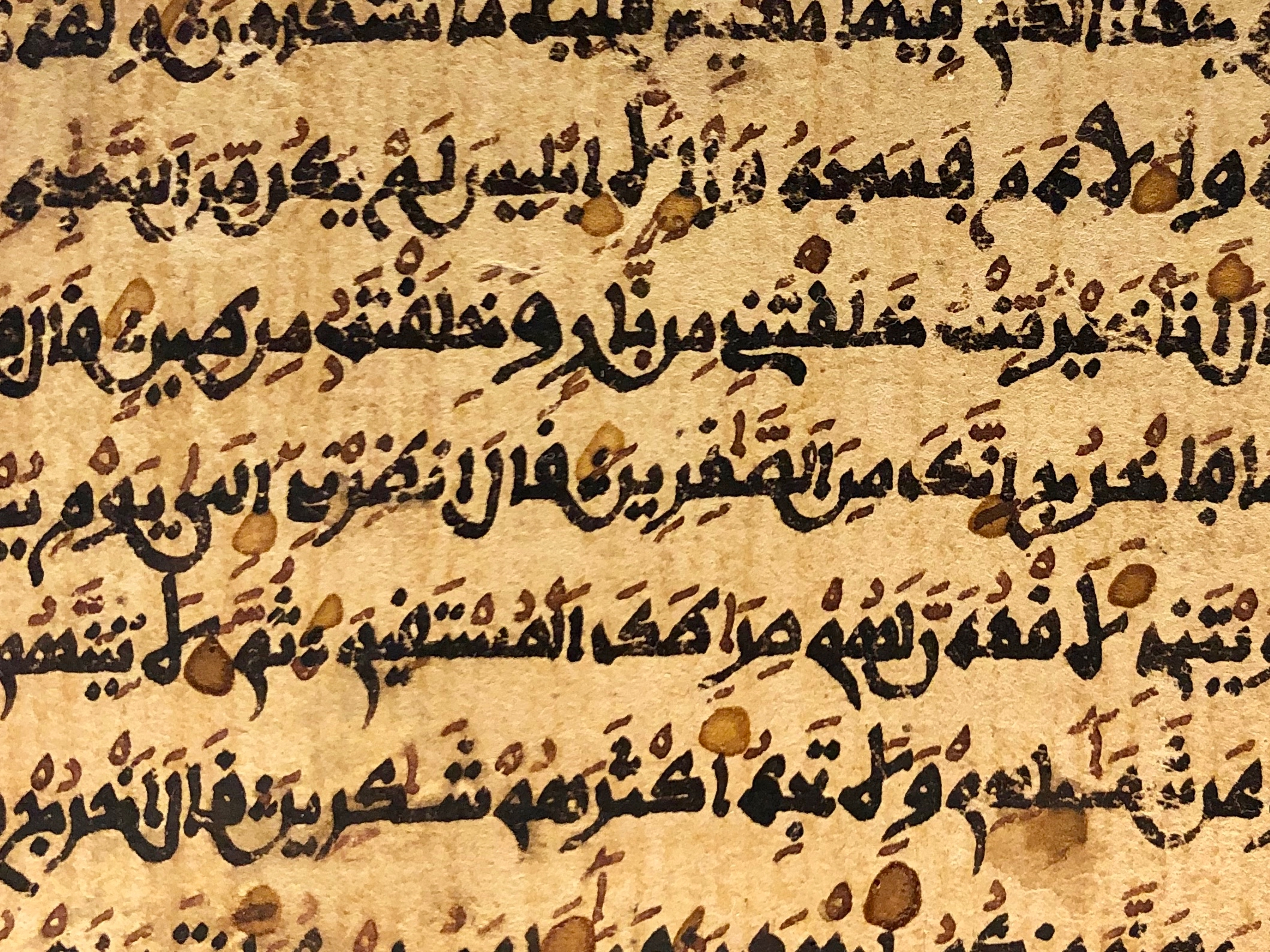
Surah "Al-A'raf" written in suqi script, named after Essouk

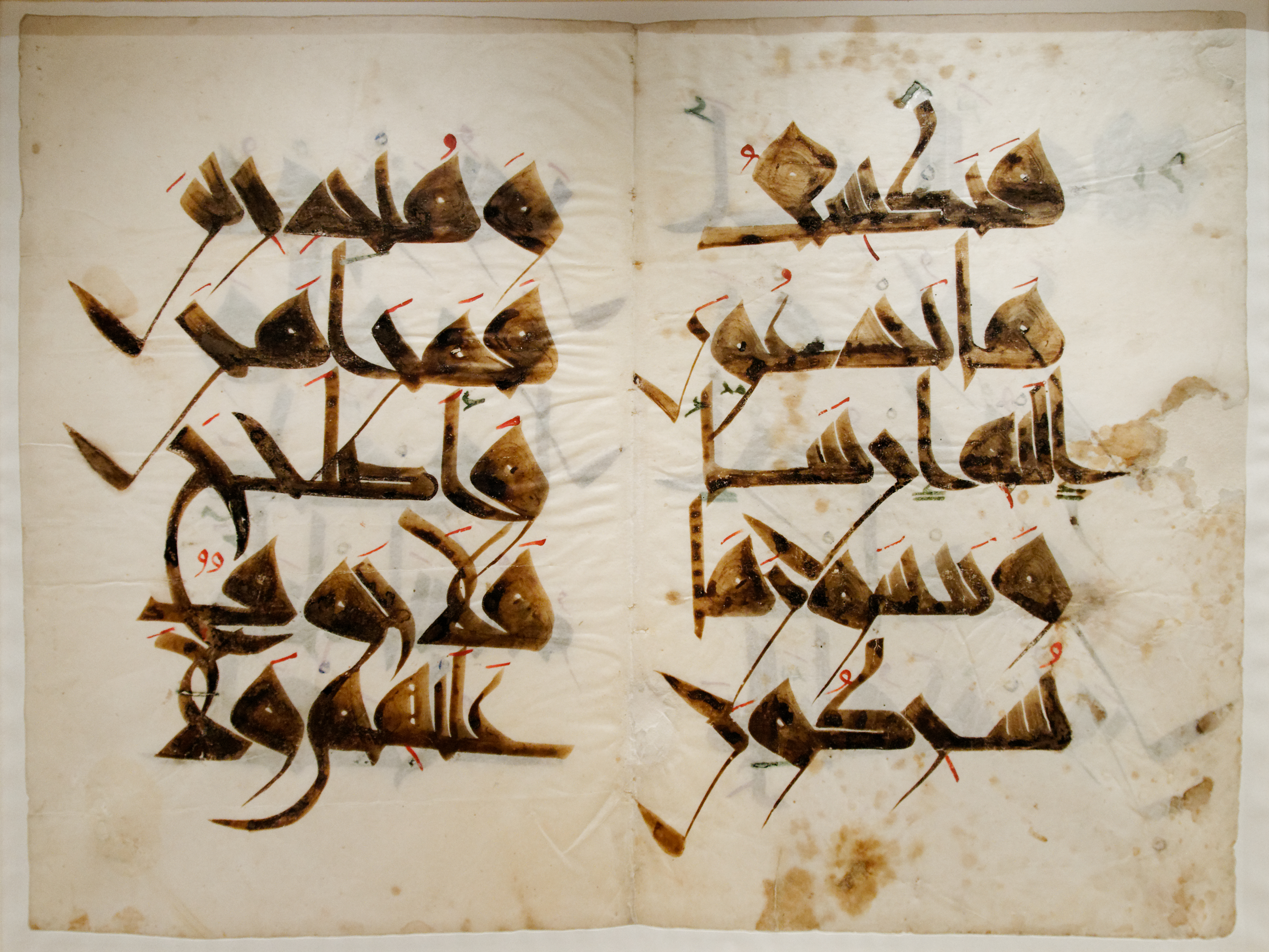
Nurse's Quran (Mushaf al-Hadina), from the Zirid period in Tunisia, in a Kufic script

Bismillah in Thuluth

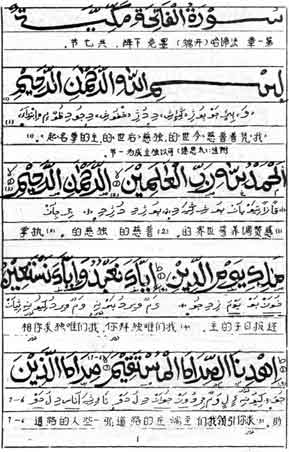
Quran in Sini script with Chinese translations

=== Modern examples ===
Bismallah calligraphy. Thuluth Jali

Muhammad calligraphy

Bismallah calligraphy

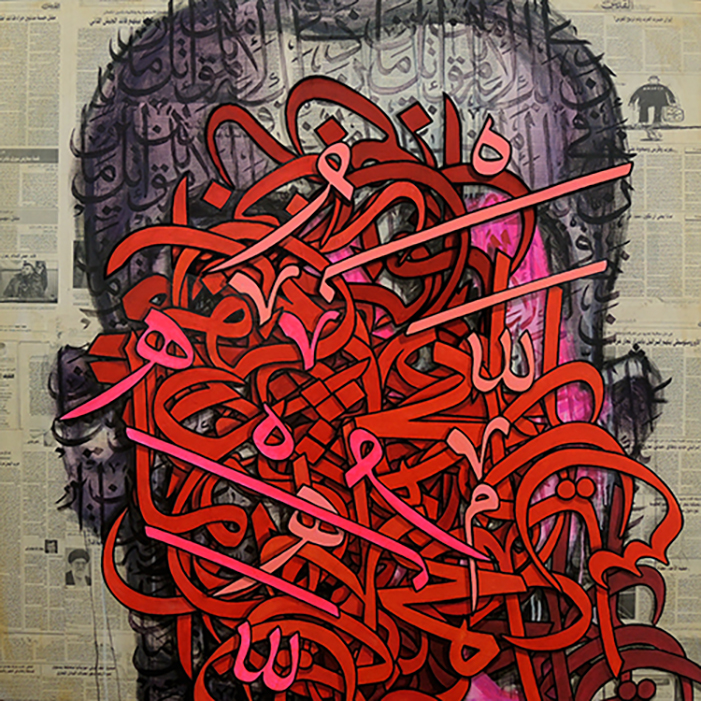
Contemporary “calligraffiti” style of Arabic calligraphy.

An example of zoomorphic calligraphy

=== Craft ===
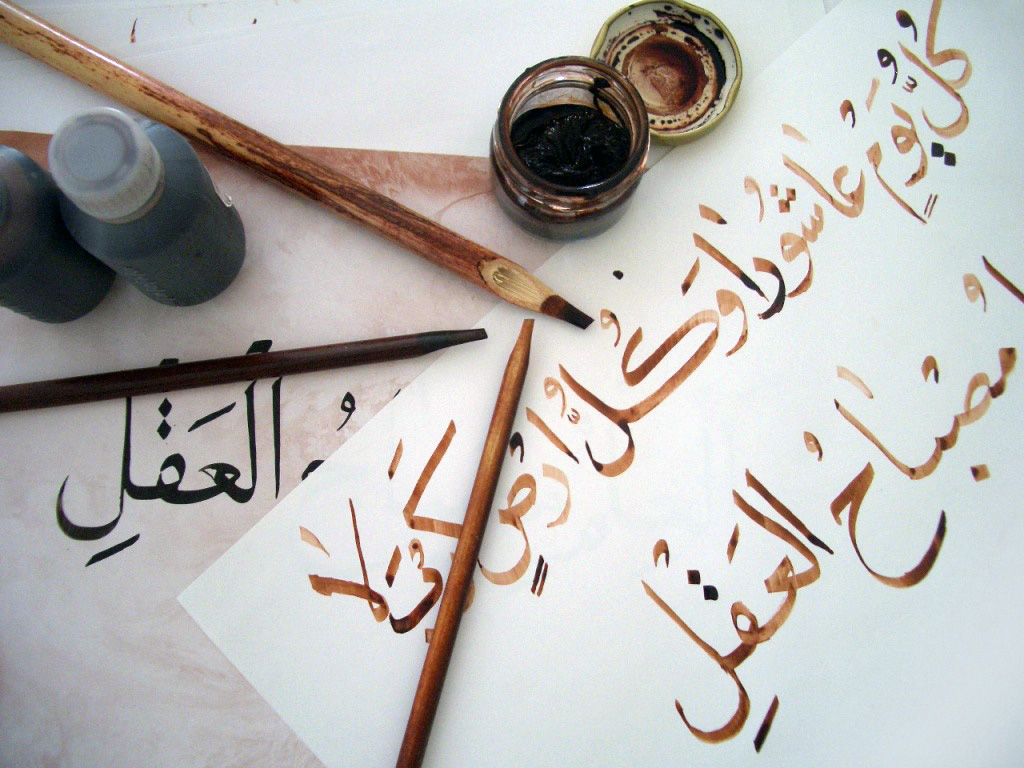
The instruments and work of a student calligrapher

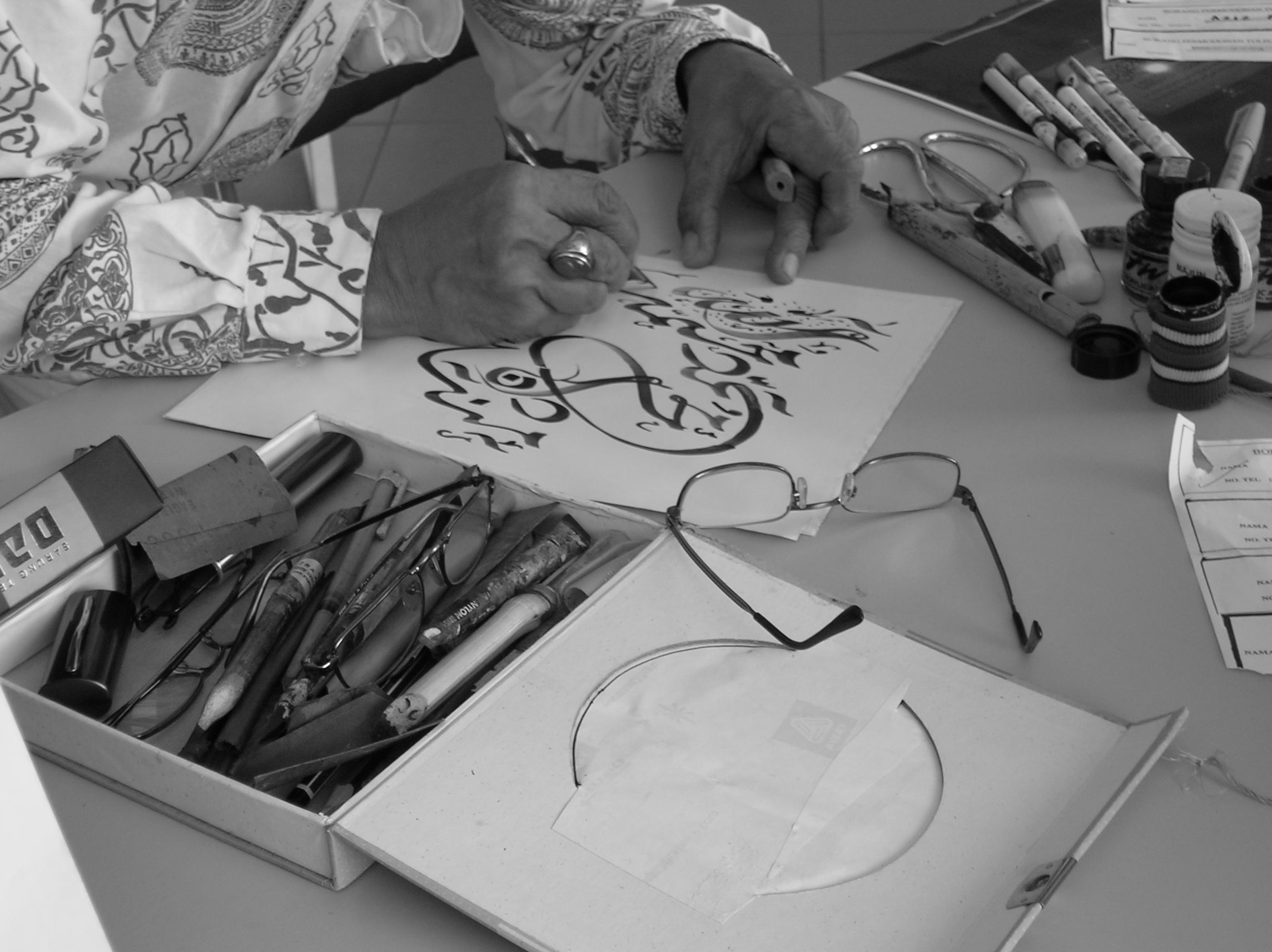
Islamic calligraphy performed by a Malay Muslim in Malaysia. Calligrapher is making a rough draft.

== List of calligraphers ==
Some classical calligraphers

Medieval

- Qutba Al-Muharrir
- Ibrahim Al-Shajri
- Yusuf Al-Shajri
- Ibn Muqla (d. 939/940)
- Ibn al-Bawwab (d. 1022)
- Fakhr-un-Nisa (12th century)
- Yaqut al-Musta'simi (d. 1298)
- Mir Ali Tabrizi (d. 14th–15th century)

Mughal

- Amanat Khan Shirazi (1570–1644 or 1645)

Ottoman era

- Shaykh Hamdullah (1436–1520)
- Ahmed Karahisari (1468–1566)
- Seyyid Kasim Gubari (d. 1624)
- Hâfiz Osman (1642–1698)
- Mustafa Râkim (1757–1826)
- Mehmed Shevki Efendi (1829–1887)
- Sami (İsmail Hakkı) Efendi (1838–1912)
- Hamid Aytaç (1891–1982)

Contemporary

- Mohammad Hosni (1894–1964), Syria
- Madiha Omar (1908–2005), Iraqi-American
- Hashem Muhammad al-Baghdadi (1917–1973), Iraq
- Shakkir Hassan Al Sa'id (1925–2004), Iraq
- Ziad Zukkari (1926–2014), Syria
- Sadequain Naqqash (1930–1987), Pakistan
- Abdul Wahid Nadir-ul-Qalam Founder of calligraphy exhibitions in Pakistan (1922-1995), Pakistan
- Ibrahim el-Salahi (born 1930), Sudan
- Abdul Djalil Pirous, known as A.D. Pirous (born 1933), Indonesian
- Uthman Taha (born 1934), Syria
- Hasan Çelebi (born 1937), Turkiye
- Charles Hossein Zenderoudi (born 1937), Iran
- Ali Adjalli (born 1939), Iranian master calligrapher, painter, poet and educator
- Wijdan Ali (born 1939), Jordan
- Mahmoud Taha (born 1942), Jordan
- Mohamed Zakariya (born 1942), United States
- Hassan Massoudy (born 1944), Iraq
- Munawar Islam (Ibne Nadir-ul-Qalam) Master in Khatte Diwani (1945-2021) Pakistan
- Fuad Honda (born 1946), Japan
- Abas Baghdadi (born 1951), Iraq
- Abdulraouf Baydoun (born 1956), Syria
- Hajji Noor Deen Mi Guangjiang (born 1963), China
- Amir Kamal (born 1972), Pakistan
- Mothanna Al-Obaydi (born 1972), Iraq
- Soraya Syed (born 1976), United Kingdom
- Nuria Garcia Masip (born 1978) Spanish calligrapher
- Anil Kumar Chawhan Indian calligrapher

== See also ==
- Illuminated manuscript
- Islamic graffiti
- Ottoman Turkish language
- Persian calligraphy
- Sini (script)
- Uthman Taha
