= Emrich Nicholson =

American art director

- Born: September 4, 1913; Shelburn, Indiana, United States
- Died: February 25, 2001 (aged 87); Puako, Hawaii; United States
- Other name: Emrich Henry Nicholson
- Occupation: Art director
- Years active: 1948–1957 (film)

Emrich Nicholson (1913–2001) was an American art director for Paramount and Universal Studios and painter of murals, and designer of furniture and merchandise associated with the 1939 New York World's Fair. In 1948, he was nominated for an Academy Award for art direction for the film One Touch of Venus. He later was the national art director for the Loe Burnett Company advertising agency. Nicholson was the father of American calligrapher and stamp designer Mohamed Zakariya and three other children by his wife, Amy Aplin.

== Selected filmography ==
- One Touch of Venus (1948)
- The Countess of Monte Cristo (1948)
- Kansas Raiders (1950)
- Son of Ali Baba (1952)
- Just Across the Street (1952)
- Taza, Son of Cochise (1954)
- Magnificent Obsession (1954)

== Bibliography ==
Demetrius John Kitses. Horizons West; Anthony Mann, Budd Boetticher, Sam Peckinpah: studies of authorship within the western. Indiana University Press, 1970.
