= Soraya Syed =

English artist (born 1976)

- Born: 1976 (age 49–50)
- Education: Central Saint Martins College of Arts and Design; SOAS, University of London; The Prince's School of Traditional Arts
- Known for: Traditional and contemporary Islamic calligraphy
- Website: www.artofthepen.com

Soraya Syed Sanders (born 1976) is an English classically trained Islamic calligrapher and artist. She uses classical Arabic calligraphy with new technologies such as holography, placing a traditional art-form into contemporary context.

== Early life ==
Soraya Syed was born in London in 1976. She is of mixed Pakistani-French origin. Her Muslim father, who was born in Kenya and whose family originated from Pakistan, came to live and work in the UK in the 1960s. Her French Catholic mother moved from Paris to London in 1970s, where the two met. Syed received a liberal upbringing that straddled these two different religions and cultures.

From a young age, Syed was shown the collections of European art in the museums of Paris by her French grandfather. He would encourage her to memorise the names of past artists, rewarding her with 10 francs for each one that she recalled. This introduction sparked her interest in the visual arts.

== Education and training ==
Syed graduated in 1995 from the Central Saint Martins College of Arts and Design, London, and went on to read Arabic and History of Art & Archaeology at the School of Oriental and African Studies, London, from which she graduated in 1999. In 2001, Syed graduated from the Masters programme in Visual Islamic and Traditional Arts at The Prince's School, London.

Syed studied Arabic calligraphy in Alexandria, Egypt during a year abroad in the second year of her degree program. Having been drawn to Arabic as a language, she sought the opportunity to study the Arabic script as a discipline and embarked on a seven-year apprenticeship in classical Islamic calligraphy.

In 2005, she was awarded the icazetname or authoritative calligraphy licence by IRCICA (International Research Centre for Islamic History, Culture and Art). At the time, she was the first and only Briton to have received the license.

== Career ==
In Istanbul, Syed learnt from different calligraphers whose craft had been passed down from teacher to student throughout the centuries. Among her teachers were the Turkish masters Efdaluddin Kilic and Hasan Celebi.

Syed's solo show, entitled Hurriyah or 'Freedom' at Leighton House Museum in London in 2013, received support from the Arts Council England.

She also created a mobile phone app called Nuqta, which creates a social-led archive of Arabic calligraphy.

Syed produced a holographic and 3D digital installation entitled Pen and the Sword in response to a commission by Cartwright Hall Art Gallery, Bradford, as part of their Bradford Museums and Galleries International Art Collection, 2015.

Syed's work has been exhibited in solo and group exhibitions as well as live calligraphy performances. Her artwork features in both private and public collections in Europe and the Middle East. In addition, she has lectured at various universities and worked with the British Museum, the British Council, and the Museum of Islamic Art, Doha. Her work was featured in the film Journey to Mecca.

== Personal life ==
Syed moved to London in 2006 and lives with her husband and children there.
