= Anil Kumar Chawhan =

Indian calligrapher

- Born: Anil Kumar Chowhan; 1970 (age 55–56)
- Education: Diploma in fine arts (dropped out)
- Known for: Islamic calligraphy
- Style: Calligraphy
- Children: 2

Anil Kumar Chawhan (Note: Also spelled in sources as Chauhan or Chowhan.) (born 1970) is an Indian calligrapher from Hyderabad. He is known for painting Quranic verses on the walls of Mosques and Dargahs in India. He received the Rehmat Alam International Peace Award in 2021.

== Life ==
Chawhan hails from a humble Marathi Hindu family from Maharashtra, his maternal grandmother is from Hyderabad, where they eventually moved.

His father, mother and grandfather were also painting artists, which sparked his interest in art from a young age.

He had to leave school after the 10th grade to support the family. He was quite skilled in drawing and painting, so he decided to pursue a career as a painter.

He later enrolled in the SV College of Fine Arts at Hi-Tech City, Hyderabad, to pursue a three-year diploma; however, after one year, he was unable to continue due to financial problems.

However, his children have not pursued painting or calligraphy. His younger brother Rajesh assists him in his work.

== Learning languages ==
In Hyderabad, where Urdu was commonly used in commerce, knowledge of the language was important, as the majority of shopkeepers were Urdu-speaking Muslims. This context motivated him to learn Urdu, which also facilitated his study of Arabic writing.

He initially lacked familiarity with the Urdu language. He self-studied and learned Urdu without formal education or a teacher.

He began by writing Urdu words without comprehension. Over time, he recognised letters and words, practising by copying from Urdu books and creating signboards.

In addition to Urdu and Arabic, Chawhan is proficient in Hindi, English, Telugu, Marathi, and Bengali. He has not received formal education in any school or madrasa; rather, he attributes his abilities to a divine gift.

== Career ==
Chawhan is known for painting Quranic Arabic verses on Mosque and Dargah walls for over 30 years.

Initially starting his career by painting Urdu signboards, Chawhan learned the language to enhance his skills. His first opportunity to paint on a mosque came from a patron impressed by his calligraphy in 1995.

He has worked in over 200 mosques, painting their walls with beautifully written Quranic passages. He states that he has not requested payment from at least a hundred mosques, receiving instead letters of gratitude for his contributions.

While he faced no opposition from his community regarding his calligraphy in mosques, some individuals from the Muslim community expressed disagreement. To address this, Chawhan obtained a fatwa in his favour from Jamia Nizamia, which helped to silence his critics.

His work is also displayed in the library of Jamia Nizamia University, showcasing verses from the Quran.

He has been employed by two mosques in Secunderabad to write Hadith (Sayings of Prophet Mohammad) on the blackboard of the masjid once a week.

He has also painted 30 temples with images of Hindu gods and goddesses, as well as countless dargahs (mausoleums) and monasteries.

Chawhan advocates for communal harmony, emphasising the peaceful coexistence of Hindus and Muslims (Ganga-Jamuni tehzeeb).

I believe art has no religion. God, Allah, Jesus: they are all one. And we’re God’s children. Today, most of my friends are Muslims. We eat together, hang out together, participate in mehfils [gatherings] and enrich each other’s lives

— Anil Kumar Chowhan, Al Jazeera

== Awards and honours ==
Chawhan received the Rehmat Alam International Peace Award on Eid Milad-un-Nabi in 2021. The award, presented by Islamic scholar Maulana Shamim-ul-Zaman Qadri from Kolkata, recognized Chauhan's voluntary contributions to writing Quranic verses in mosques. Additionally, Bazm Rehmat Alam organized an exhibition of his calligraphy works in celebration of Milad-un-Nabi.

== Miracles ==
Chawhan has several intriguing experiences from his work in the mosques, some of which he describes as spiritual. He shared two encounters with Muslim Mirror that he considers miraculous, feeling a divine presence during these moments.

One such experience occurred during Ramadan, after the night prayers when most people had left the mosque. While painting verses from the Quran, he became tired and drowsy, eventually falling asleep while standing on a high stool with the brush in hand. When he awoke more than an hour later, he found that the verses had already been painted.

Another experience was particularly harrowing, as he narrowly escaped a fall.

After completing his calligraphic work in a mosque, Chawhan descended a wooden ladder. Just as he stepped off the last rung, the entire ladder collapsed.

It was as if the ladder was waiting for me to finish my work so it could break. It all happened within a fraction of a second, I was dumbstruck. Such incidents, where I feel a divine presence around me, remind me of how fortunate I am. Even God seems pleased with my work

— Anil Kumar Chawhan, Muslim Mirror
