= Nuria Garcia Masip =

Spanish calligrapher (born 1978)

Nuria Garcia Masip (born in 1978) is a Spanish calligrapher of Arabic calligraphy. She started to learn Arabic calligraphy when she visited Morocco. In 2000, she learned Arabic calligraphy under the tutelage of calligrapher Mohamed Zakariya. Her interest in calligraphy took her to Istanbul, where she learned the various scripts and styles of Arabic calligraphy from Hasan Çelebi and Davut Bektaş. In 2007, she received a certificate in the Thuluth and Naskh scripts.

== Life and career ==
Nuria Garcia Masip grew up in Spain and the United States. After finishing her B.A. degree in 1999, she visited Morocco and developed her knowledge about Islamic art and Maghrebi calligraphy under the sponsorship of Moroccan calligrapher, Belaid Hamidi. In 2000, she returned to Washington, D.C. where she started the Riq'a. Thuluth, and Naskh scripts by Calligrapher Mohammed Zakariya. In 2004, she went to Istanbul, where she learned the various scripts and styles of Arabic calligraphy from Hasan Celebi and Davut Bektaş. In 2007, she received Ijazah, a certificate in the Thuluth and Naskh scripts by her three tutors. Nuria holds a Masters in Art History from the Sorbonne University, and she is currently living in Paris where she teaches, researches, and works on calligraphy.
