= Hasan Çelebi =

Turkish calligrapher (1937–2025)

Hasan Çelebi (1937 – 24 February 2025) was a Turkish master of Islamic calligraphy. He was a student of Hamid Aytaç.

== Life and career ==
Çelebi was born in Erzurum, Turkey. In 1954, he moved to Istanbul for religious education, attending school to learn Arabic and study Islam. He devoted his whole life to calligraphy, and was described by Caryle Murphy of The Washington Post as one "of the most celebrated masters of classical Ottoman calligraphy style". His work was included in an exhibition of Iranian and Turkish calligraphy at the Saba Institute in Tehran. His former student, Mohammed Zakariya, is an American master calligrapher who lectures in the USA and in the Middle East.

Çelebi died in Istanbul on 24 February 2025, at the age of 88. His life was depicted in the documentary "Hattın İzinde Bir Ömür" (A Lifetime in Pursuit of Calligraphy).

== See also ==
- Soraya Syed, a British Islamic calligrapher and artist, and one of Hasan Çelebi's students
- Hasan Çelebi (Ottoman era), a disciple of Ahmed Karahisari
