= Mohamed Zakariya =

American calligrapher

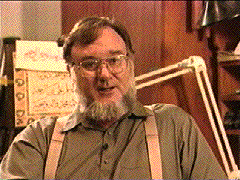
Mohamed Zakariya

Mohamed Zakariya (born 1942 in Ventura, California) is an American master Islamic calligrapher and an American Muslim convert.

== Biography ==
Mohamed Zakariya was born in 1942 in Ventura, California, the son of art director Emrich Nicholson and Amy Aplin. Later he moved to Los Angeles with his family. Zakariya saw Islamic calligraphy for the first time in the window of an Armenian carpet store in Los Angeles. Zakariya traveled to Morocco in his late teens where he became fascinated with Islam and Islamic Calligraphy. After returning from his trip to the United States he converted to Islam.

Zakariya studied manuscripts in the British Museum. He then studied with the Egyptian calligrapher Abdussalam Ali-Nour. Afterward, in 1984, he traveled to Istanbul and became a student of the Turkish master calligrapher Hasan Celebi. He received his diploma from Celebi in 1988 at the Research Center of Islamic History, Art, and Culture in Istanbul. He is the first American to receive this honor. In 1997, he received his second diploma, in the ta'liq script, from the master calligrapher Ali Alparslan.

From 2004 to 2012, Zakariya was a member of the Joint Advisory Board, Virginia Commonwealth University School of the Arts in Qatar. He was awarded an Honorary Doctorate of Humane Letters by the university in 2012.

Students worldwide travel to the United States to study under Zakariya.

== Calligraphy ==
Mohamed Zakariya is one of the prominent master calligraphers in Arabic Script Calligraphy, also known as Islamic Calligraphy. Viewed as a contemporary artist who practices traditional Islamic calligraphy, he focuses on styles of Ottoman and Turkish calligraphy (including hilyes, besmeles, ayets, kitas and levhas).

Mohamed Zakariya is not only a master of calligraphy, but he also executes all aspects of the process of creating a calligraphic artwork, from treating paper and preparing his tools and materials to illuminating the page. In addition, an important part of being a master calligrapher is cutting the pen (qalam). A hollow reed is used to make the pen, and the thicknesses of the reed as well as the cut of the nib results in a variety in sizes of pens for writing different styles and scales of scripts.

According to Zakariya, his choices of material, script, and illumination all depend on the word or phrase he is writing. The planning process for each piece is carefully thought through so that the visual design reflects the meaning of the phrase or word that is written. Furthermore, when choosing the words or phrases he states: “I find my texts in classic Arabic and Ottoman Turkish books, including poetry, aphorisms, collections of Hadith, and Quranic ayets. Study and tafsir are the sources of my concepts.”

Prior to learning the art of calligraphy, Mohamed Zakariya worked as a “machinist” and created various instruments such as astrolabes. The materials, techniques, and precision the learned as a machinist also informs his approach to calligraphy. According to the artist, “In approaching my work, I rely on methods informed by my industrial background: every work must be made in the most efficient and practical way possible to get the most powerful effect possible, using the best and most appropriate materials and methods. Some of my methodology I have learned in the shops, some I have reverse-engineered from observation of original work, and some I have gathered from ancient Arabic, Turkish, and English texts.”

=== Learning and teaching ===
Mohamed Zakariya can trace his master-student lineage through his teacher, Hasan Çelebi, back to the great Ottoman calligrapher Sheikh Hamdullah. He learned the art of ebru (marbled paper) from Alparslan Babaoğlu, paper preparation skills from Sabahattin Basaran, and talik script from Ali Alparslan.

Students who have received their icazets under Zakariya’s tutelage include Nuria Garcia Masip and Josh Berer.

=== Exhibitions and collections ===
Throughout his career as a working artist, Mohamed Zakariya has had a total of 12 solo exhibitions between the years of 1975–2011 and his work has been featured in 22 group exhibitions between the years of 1988–2015. From 1977–2009, he completed 16 selected commissions for a variety of clients. Out of his exhibitions, both solo and group, 20 of them were located within the United States, 4 in Qatar, 4 in Saudi Arabia, 2 in Türkiye, 2 in Kuwait, 1 in Iraq, and 1 in Egypt.

Zakariya's work is held in private collections and some public collections. He designed a postage stamp for the United States Postal Service to commemorate Eids (Eid al-Fitr and Eid al-Adha), which appeared in all editions issued to date. In 2009, US president Barack Obama commissioned Mohamed Zakariya to create a piece of calligraphy that was presented to the king of Saudi Arabia.

- Asian Art Museum (San Francisco, California, United States)
- Asian Civilisations Museum (Singapore)
- Harvard Art Museums (Cambridge, Massachusetts, United States)
- Smithsonian Institution's Renwick Gallery (Washington DC, United States)
- Smithsonian’s National Postal Museum (Washington DC, United States)
- Klutznick National Jewish Museum (Washington DC, United States)
- Metropolitan Museum of Art (New York City, New York, United States)
- Walters Art Museum (Baltimore, Maryland, United States)
