= Empire of the Sultans =

Touring Islamic art exhibition (1995–2004)

Empire of the Sultans: Ottoman Art of the Khalili Collection
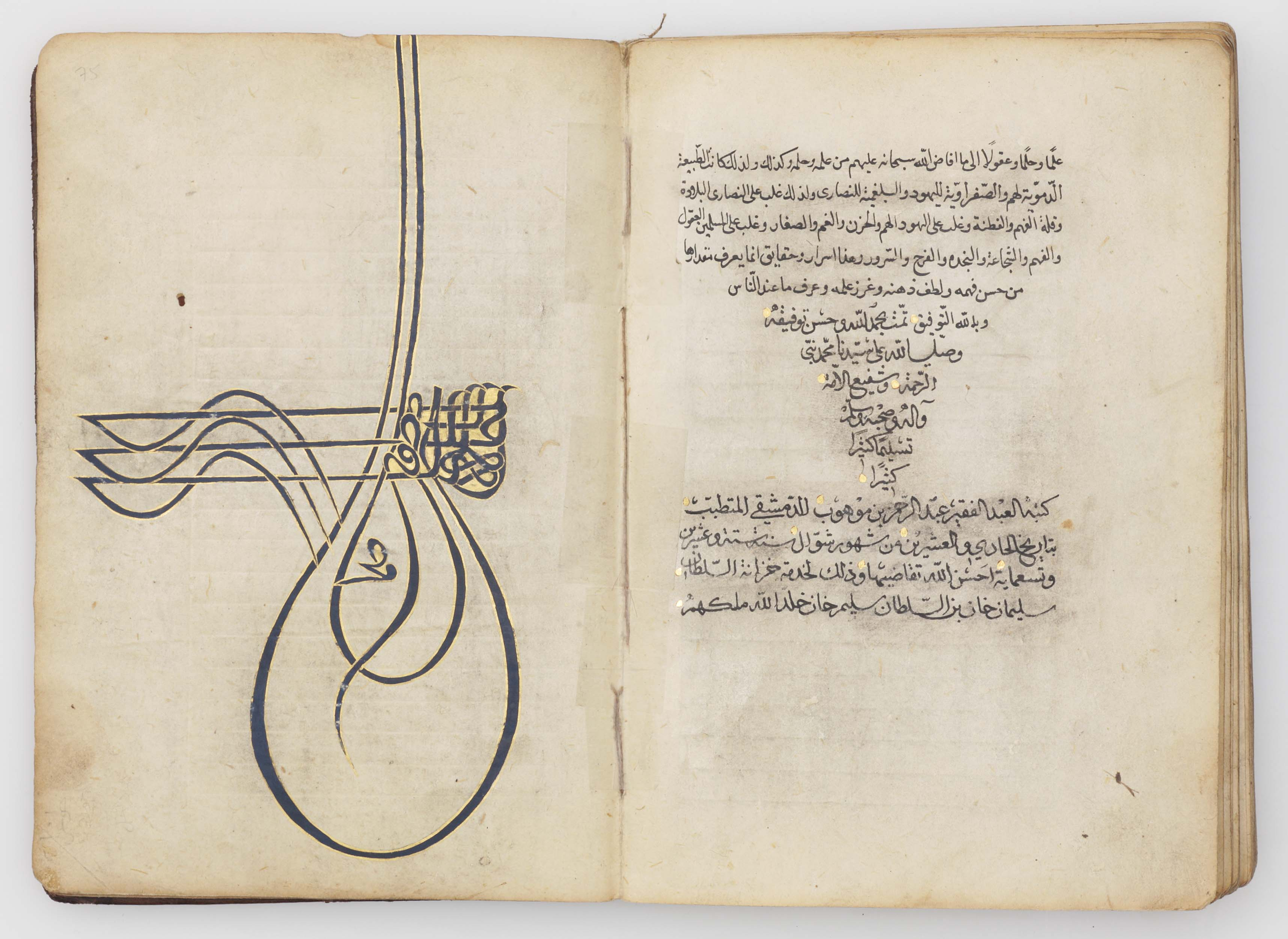
- Kitab al-Hadi al-Muhammadi fi'l-Tibb al-Nabawi (Treatise on Prophetic Medicine) with the tughra (monogram, left) of Suleiman the Magnificent, 1520
- Date: 1995–2004
- Venue: Locations in Switzerland, the UK, Israel, and the US
- Type: Art exhibition
- Theme: Ottoman Empire

Empire of the Sultans: Ottoman Art of the Khalili Collection was a 1995–2004 touring exhibition displaying objects from the Khalili Collection of Islamic Art. Around two hundred exhibits, including calligraphy, textiles, pottery, weapons, and metalwork, illustrated the art and daily life of six centuries of the Ottoman Empire. Many of the objects had been created for the leaders of the empire, the sultans. Two of the calligraphic pieces were the work of sultans themselves.

In the 1990s, the exhibition was hosted by institutions in Switzerland, the United Kingdom, and Israel. It visited thirteen cities in the United States from 2000 to 2004, a period when Islam became especially controversial due to the September 11 attacks and the subsequent wars in the Middle East. Critics described the exhibition as wide-ranging and informative. They praised it for showing beautiful art works—naming the calligraphy in particular—and for presenting a fresh view of Islam. Catalogues were published in both English and French.

== Background ==
The Ottoman Empire in 1590

The Ottoman Empire lasted from the 13th century until 1922 and, at its peak, had territory in three continents: Asia, Europe, and Africa. In 1516 and 1517, it took over Mecca, Medina, and Jerusalem, the holiest cities of Islam. Although officially an Islamic state, the empire was culturally diverse and multilingual, including Christians and Jews as well as Muslims.

Through the history of the Ottoman Empire, its rulers, the sultans, were patrons of the arts. At the capital Constantinople, they created institutes to train and organise architects and artists, establishing distinctive Ottoman styles of architecture, manuscript illustration, and design. The Ottomans developed distinctive styles of Islamic calligraphy, improving its practice for nearly 500 years. In the 19th century it was routine for the sultans themselves to be trained in calligraphy. The empire reached its greatest extent during the 16th-century reign of Suleiman the Magnificent. Suleiman and his successors used their wealth to build the Topkapı Palace and other buildings in Constantinople, including large mosque complexes decorated inside with architectural inscriptions.

For much of its history, Islamic sacred art has been characterised by aniconism: a prohibition against depictions of living beings. Islamic cultures and time periods differed in how they interpreted this, either as applying narrowly to religious art or to art as a whole. Islamic artists compensated for the restrictions on figurative art by using decorative calligraphy, geometric patterns, and stylised foliage known as arabesque.

Sir Nasser David Khalili is a British-Iranian scholar, collector, and philanthropist who has assembled the world's largest private collection of Islamic art. The Khalili Collection of Islamic Art spans the time period from 700 to 2000 and includes religious art works and decorative objects as well as those with secular purposes. Empire of the Sultans was the first exhibition drawn entirely from this collection and the first major exhibition at the School of Oriental and African Studies' Brunei Gallery. Some of its objects had never before been put on public display.

== Content ==
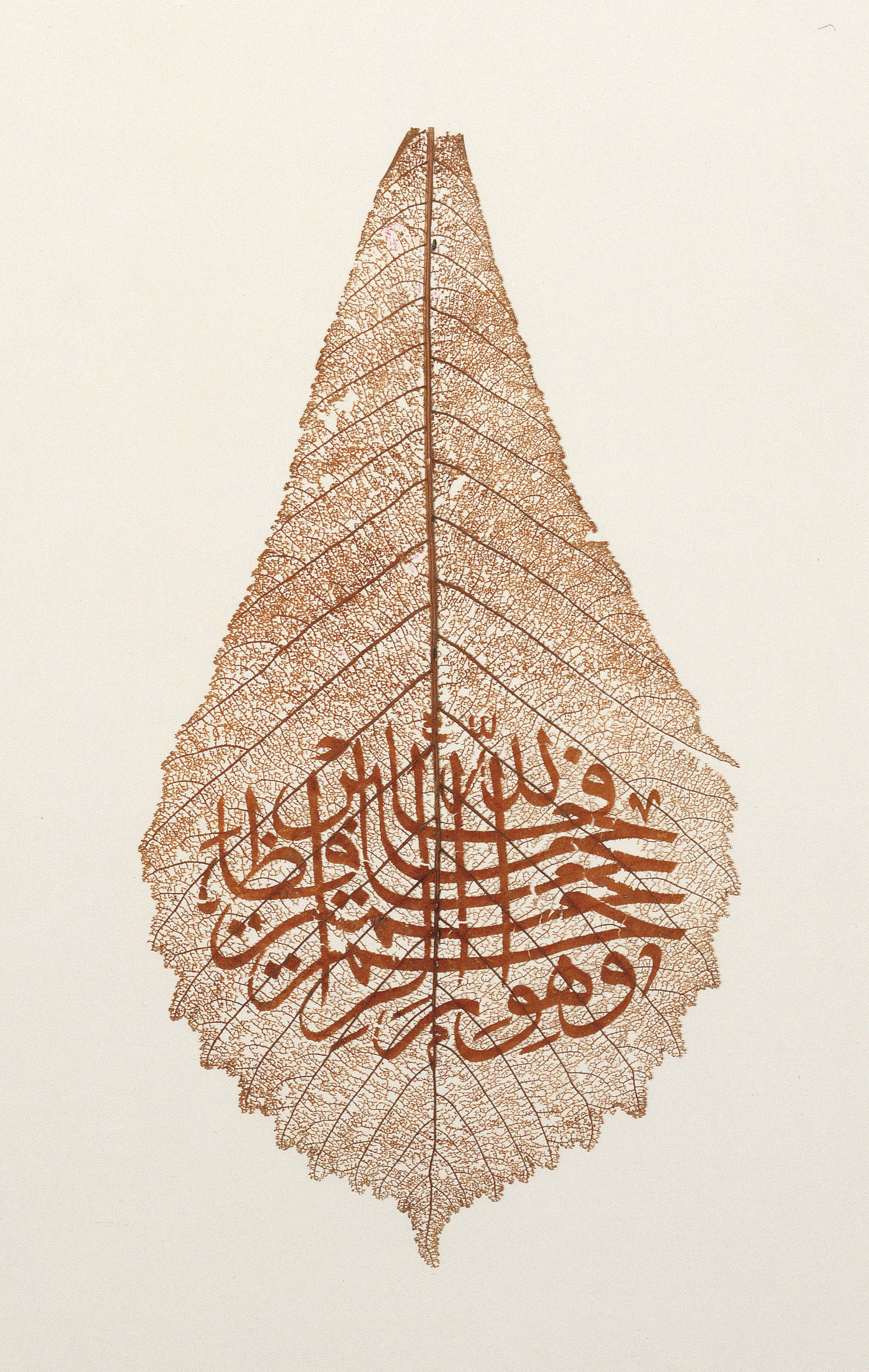
Calligraphic composition on horse chestnut leaf, 19th century

The exhibition's curators were J. M. Rogers, the collection's honorary curator; and Nahla Nassar, its acting curator and registrar. More than 200 objects were on display, covering six centuries of the Ottoman Empire. These exhibits fell into four sections. "In the service of God" displayed texts including the Quran as well as furniture and ornaments for decorating mosques. "Sultans, soldiers and scribes" included armour, banners, and documents relating to the administration of the empire. "Arts and crafts" included metalwork, textiles, glass, and ceramics. Finally, "books, paintings and scripts" included manuscript paintings, calligraphic works, tools associated with calligraphy, and book bindings. Most objects in the exhibition bore some form of calligraphy.

Some venues had listening stations that let visitors listen to music from Ottoman Turkey and hear stories in Arabic and English. At Brigham Young University, carpenters recreated facades of Turkish mosques.

=== In the service of God ===
The religious manuscripts included thirty-two calligraphed Qurans or Quran sections. These included the work of notable calligraphers including Ahmed Karahisari, Sheikh Hamdullah, Hâfiz Osman, and Mustafa Izzet Efendi. Other literary works included the Masnavi of Rumi and the Dala'il al-Khayrat, a collection of prayers. Wooden roundels, painted with Quranic quotes or the names of the Islamic prophet Muhammad and of the first caliphs, had been used to decorate mosques. Similar decorative calligraphy was embroidered on silk or satin textiles, including a black satin panel from a covering for the door of the Kaaba. Mosque furnishings on display included candlesticks and decorative door fittings in brass or copper. There were qibla compasses used to find the direction of Mecca for prayer and astrolabe quadrants for telling the time for prayer from the rising of stars.

=== Sultans, soldiers and scribes ===
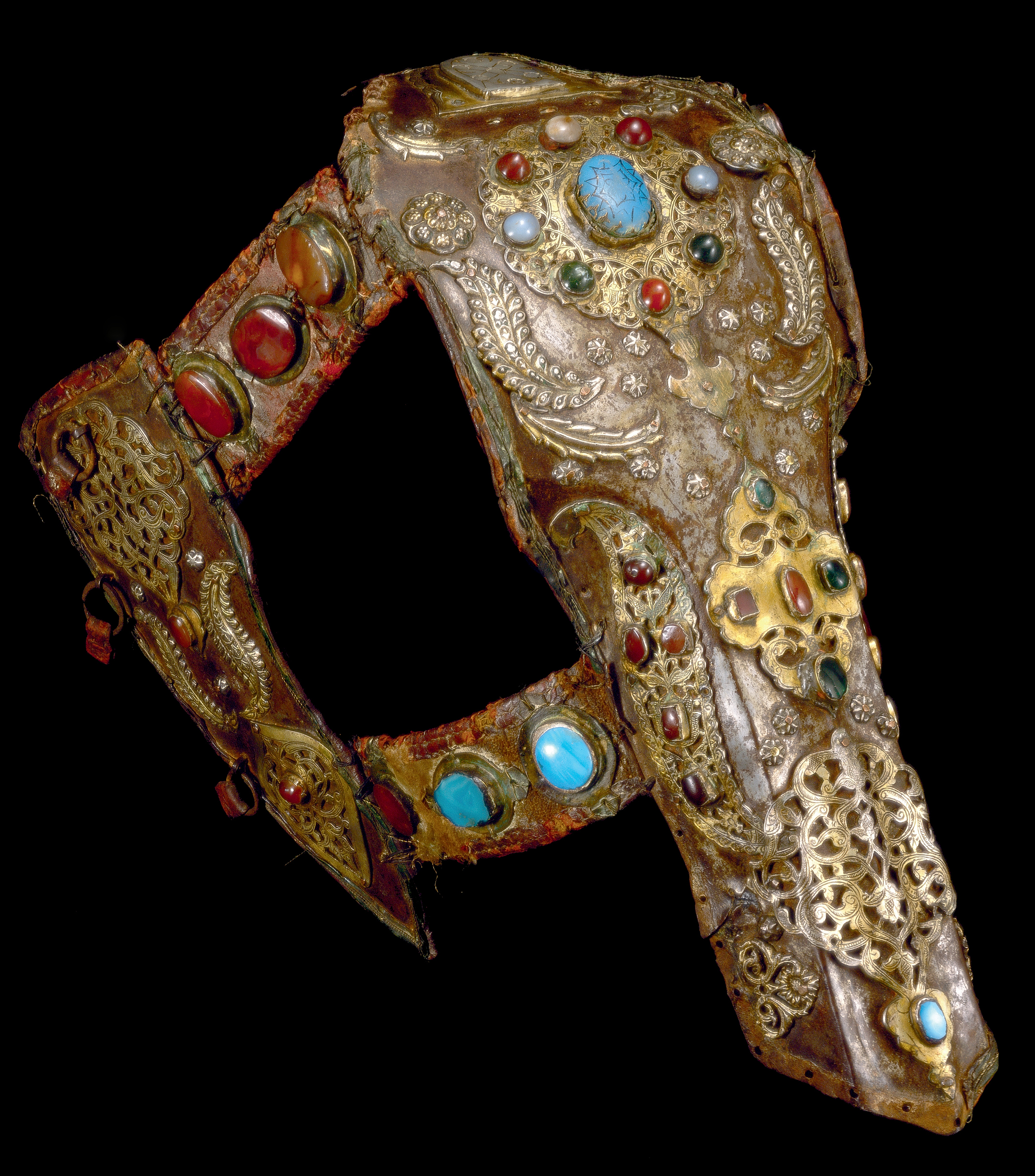
Chamfron and cheek-pieces (armour for a horse), 18th century

The armour on display included helmets, chain mail shirts, and a 15th century war mask. These were mainly forged from iron or steel. Some of this armour was for horses: chamfrons which protected their faces and also served an ornamental purpose. A cotton talismanic shirt was decorated with Quranic quotations, prayers, and the 99 names of God. Weapons on display included daggers, swords, and flintlock guns, many with inscriptions and fine decorative patterns created by damascening (inlaying gold and silver wires into a metal surface). The daggers and swords included the earliest surviving example of a curved Islamic sword upon which was engraved the name of Baybars, a 13th-century Mamluk sultan. The Ottomans took this from Egypt and added gold damascening. Military banners bore the names of God and Muhammad along with prayers and invocations. An image distinctive to Ottoman banners was Zulfiqar, the two-bladed sword that Muhammad is said to have taken at the Battle of Badr. A section of one such banner was included in the exhibition.

The documents included grants of land and income. As official proclamations of the sultan, these used highly ornate, stylised calligraphy and incorporated the sultan's tughra, an elaborate monogram that was their official seal. The display included tughras of Suleiman the Magnificent, Selim II, Murad III, Ahmed I, Mehmed IV, Abdul Hamid I, and Abdulmecid I. Two manuscripts told histories of the sultans, illustrated with portrait paintings.

=== Arts and crafts ===
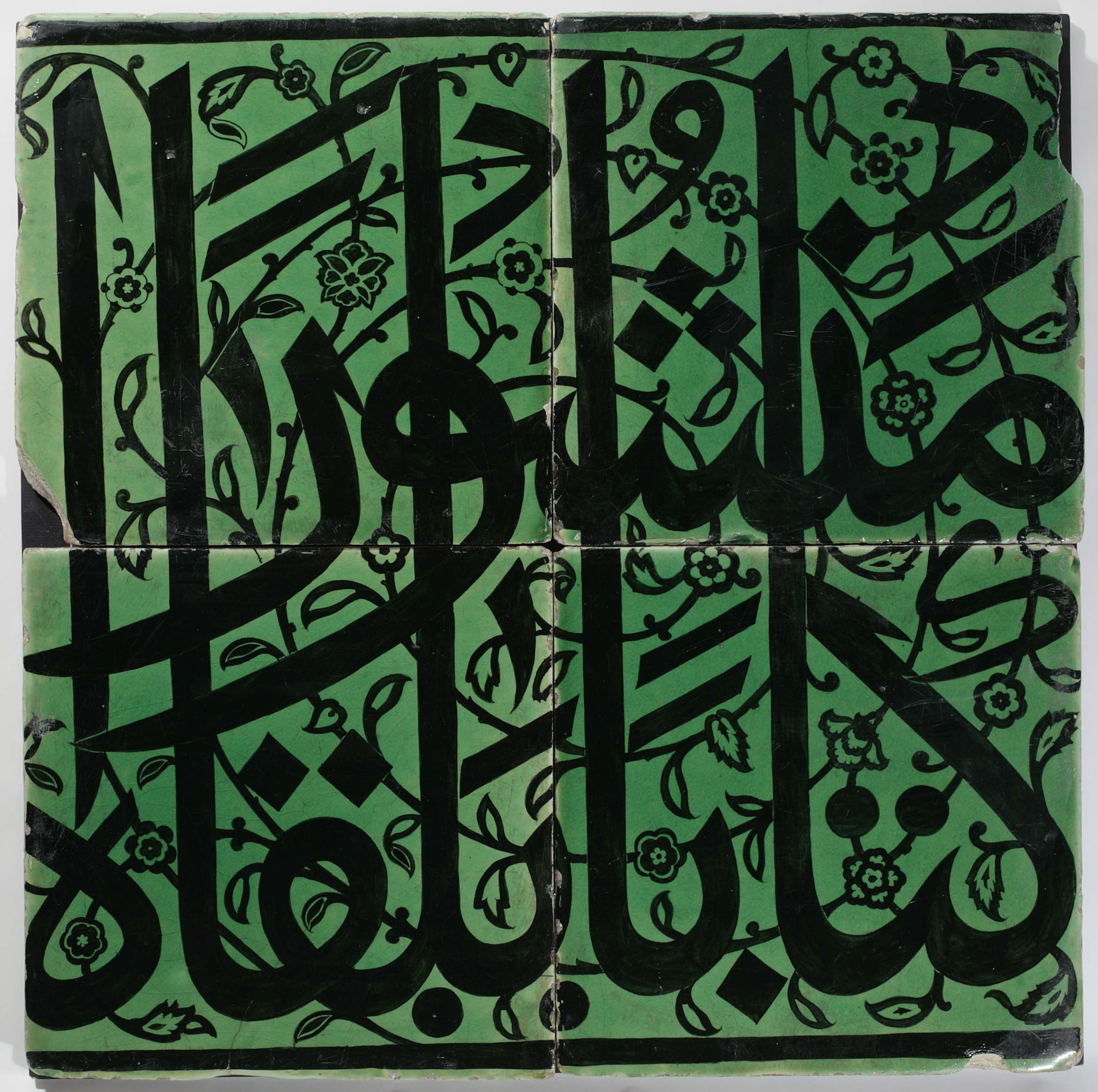
Four tiles from a frieze with a calligraphed inscription from the 17th chapter of the Quran, c. 1550

The third section included metalwork, pottery, jade, and textiles. The domestic metalwork objects were made of silver, brass, or gilt copper. The textiles, from the 16th and 17th centuries, included rugs and woven silk lampas panels from locations around the Ottoman Empire.

In the late 16th century, the Ottomans used Iznik pottery, with its bold colours on white, to decorate imperial palaces and mosques. Several examples from Iznik were included in the exhibition, including tiles, dishes, and vases. Other pottery on display included fritware dishes from Syria and a set of twelve fritware bowls made in 1860, each inscribed in Arabic with "Imperial Chamber" and "a gift for his excellency Abraham Lincoln". The curators were not able to establish why or where this gift was made for Lincoln, beyond that the inscription suggests they were made in Turkey. A 16th or 17th century tile panel, 207 by 112.5 centimetres (6.79 ft × 3.69 ft), bore two calligraphed statements of faith, suggesting it was made to decorate a mosque.

=== Books, paintings and scripts ===
The final section of the exhibition included calligraphic works, manuscript paintings, decorative book bindings, and tools used by calligraphers. The calligraphic works included single panels, albums, and inscriptions on leaves. Among their scribes were notable calligraphers such as Sheikh Hamdullah, Mahmud Celaleddin Efendi, and Mehmed Şevkî Efendi. The exhibition had calligraphy panels by two sultans, Abdulmejid I and Mahmud II. One type of calligraphic work special to Islam is the hilye, a description in words of the qualities of Muhammad or other prophets of Islam. On display were several examples of hilyes. Some of these followed a standard pattern with main text inside a central medallion and additional names and quotations in surrounding panels; others had unconventional layouts or textual inclusions.

Among the paintings and drawings were portraits from poetry manuscripts, painted within elaborate decorative borders, and two examples of the saz style which combines fantastical foliage and creatures.

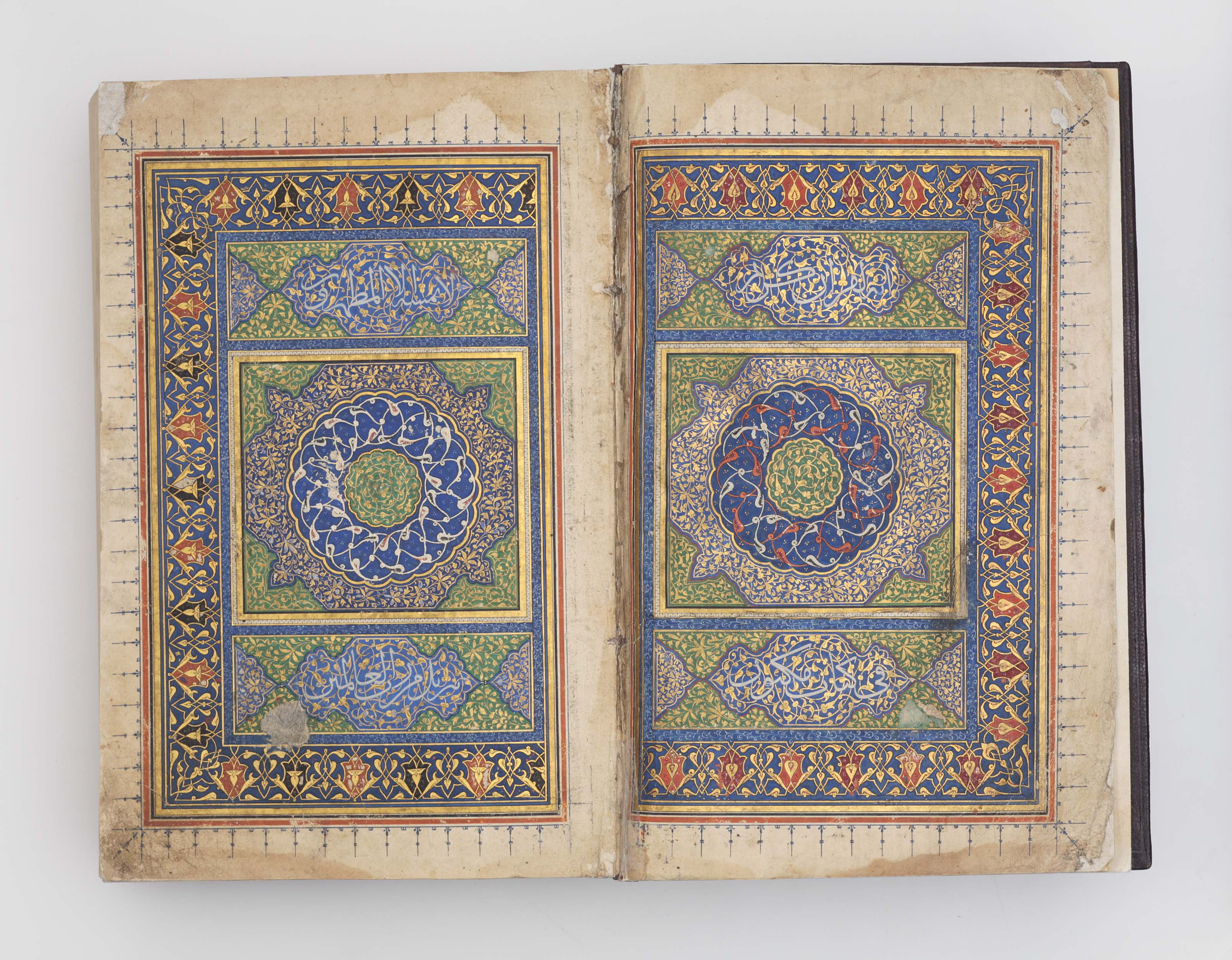
Single-volume Quran, c. 1470

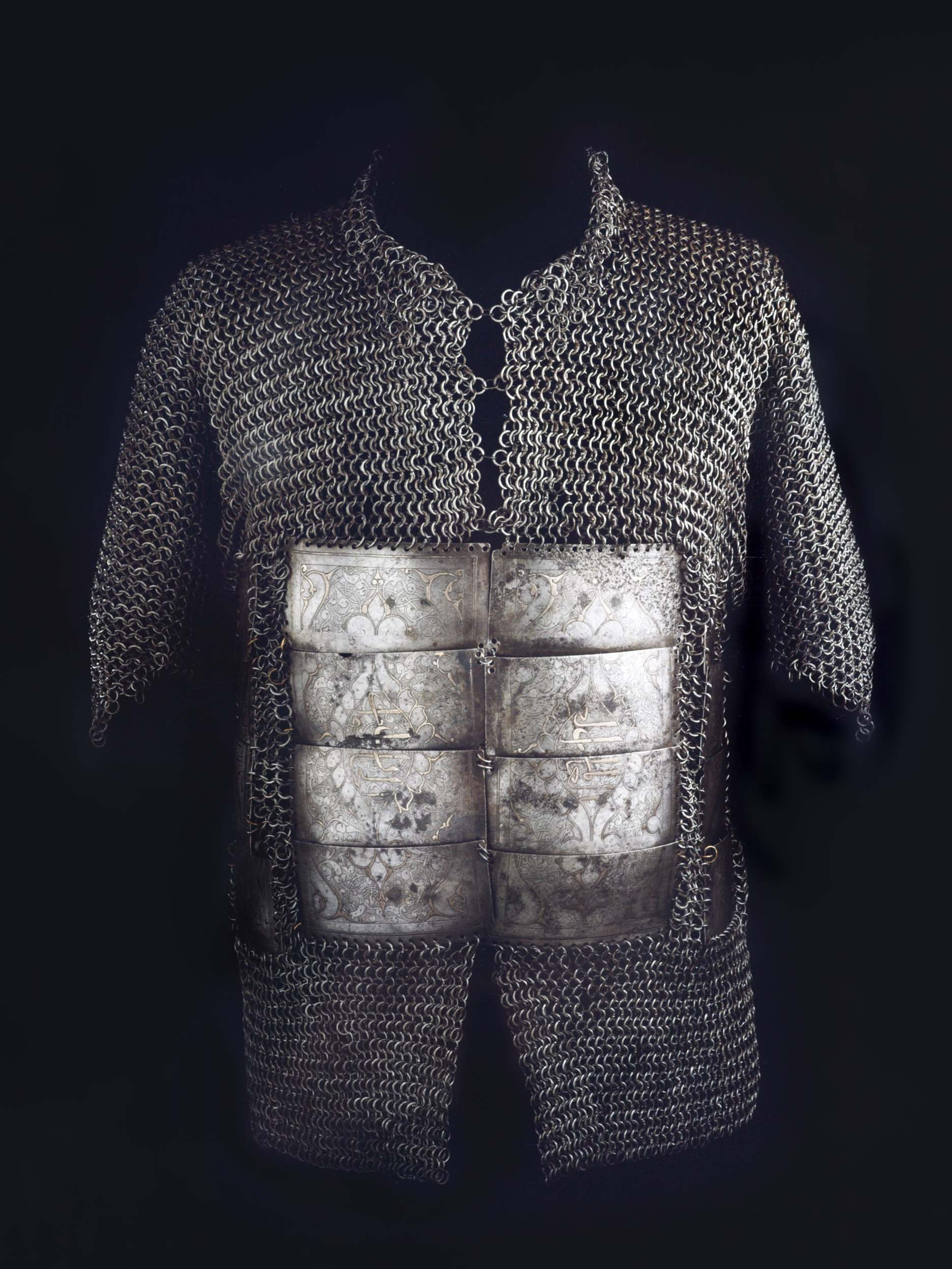
Chain mail and plate shirt, late 15th or early 16th century

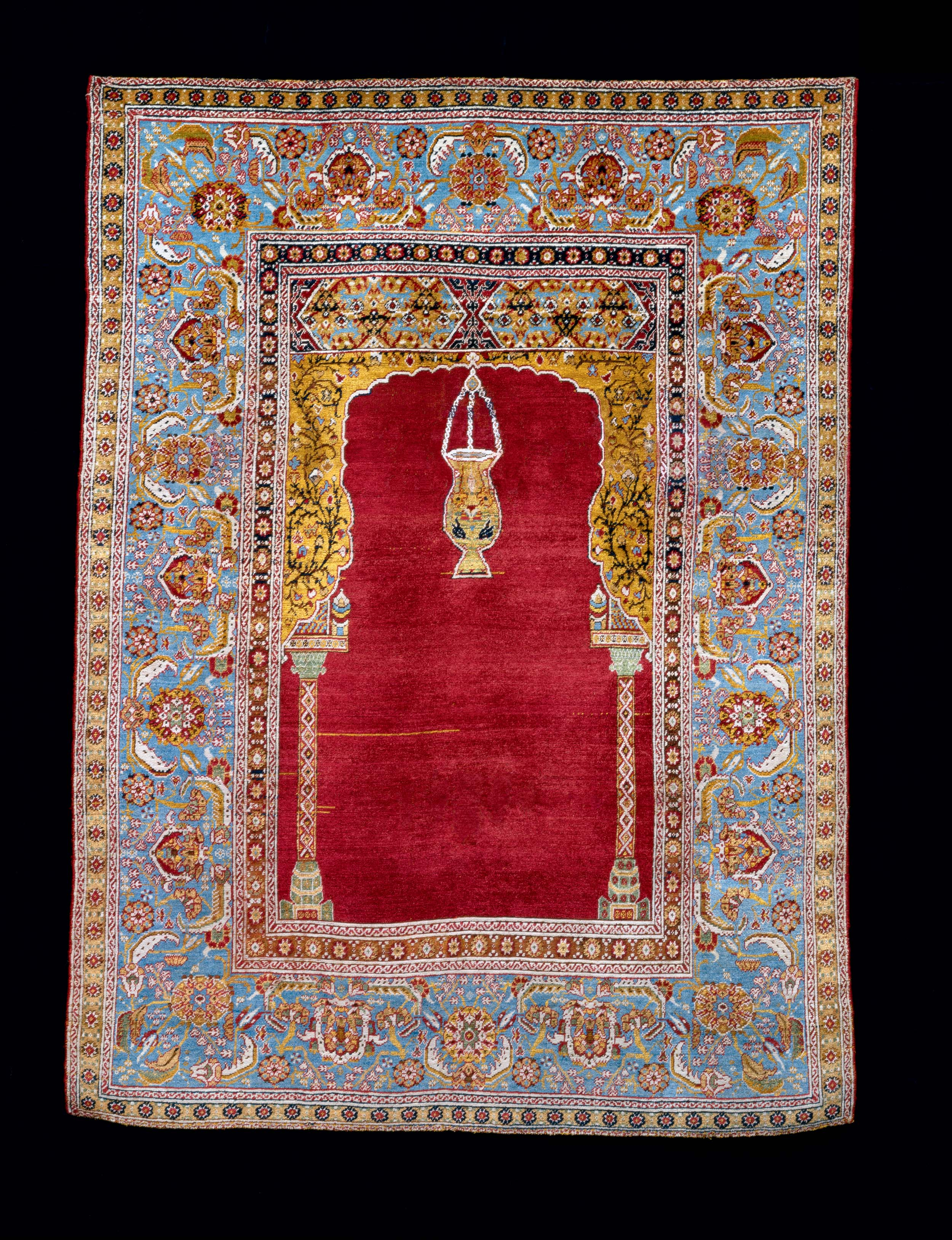
Niche rug, late 16th or early 17th century

== Venues ==
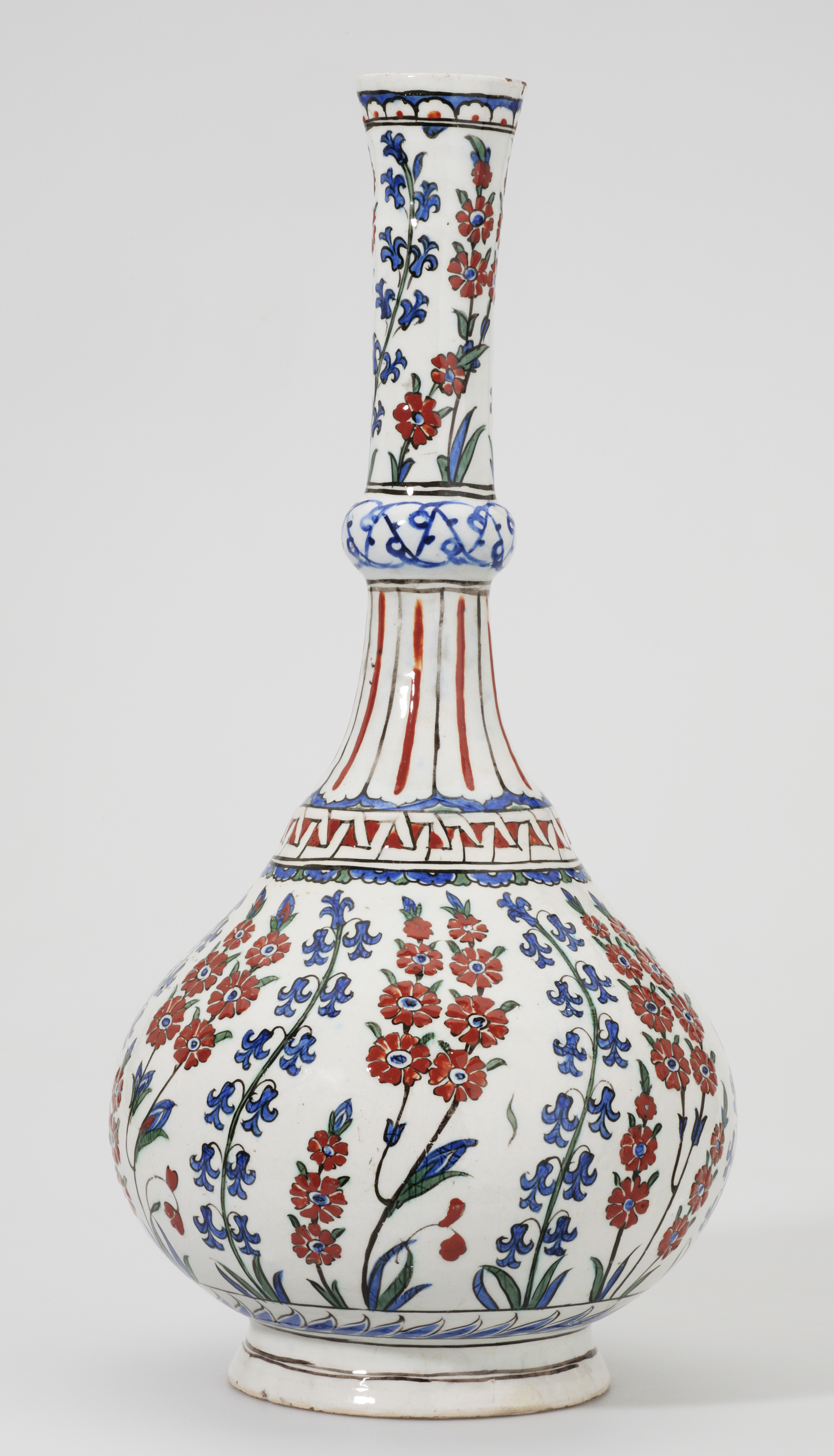
Flask from Iznik, c. 1560–1580

The exhibition travelled to a total of sixteen venues in four countries. Some venues put on special events, including performances of Turkish music, film viewings, lectures, and demonstrations of calligraphy.

- Musée Rath, Geneva, Switzerland, July–September 1995
- Brunei Gallery, School of Oriental and African Studies, University of London, UK, July–October 1996
- Israel Museum, Jerusalem, Israel, December 1996 – June 1997

Thirteen venues were in the United States, the first time an exhibition from the Khalili Collections had been held in North America.

- Society of the Four Arts, Palm Beach, Florida, February–April 2000
- Detroit Institute of Arts, Detroit, Michigan, July–October 2000
- Albuquerque Museum of Art and History, Albuquerque, New Mexico, October 2000 – January 2001
- Portland Art Museum, Portland, Oregon, January–April 2001
- Asian Art Museum of San Francisco, San Francisco, California, August–October 2001
- Bruce Museum of Arts and Science, Greenwich, Connecticut, October 2001 – January 2002
- Milwaukee Art Museum, Milwaukee, Wisconsin, February–April 2002
- North Carolina Museum of Art, Raleigh, North Carolina, May–July 2002
- Museum of Art, Brigham Young University, Provo, Utah, August 2002 – January 2003
- Oklahoma City Museum of Art, Oklahoma City, Oklahoma, February–April 2003
- Frist Center for the Visual Arts, Nashville, Tennessee, May–August 2003
- Museum of Arts and Sciences, Macon, Georgia, August–November 2003
- Frick Art and Historical Center, Pittsburgh, Pennsylvania, November 2003 – February 2004

== Reception and legacy ==
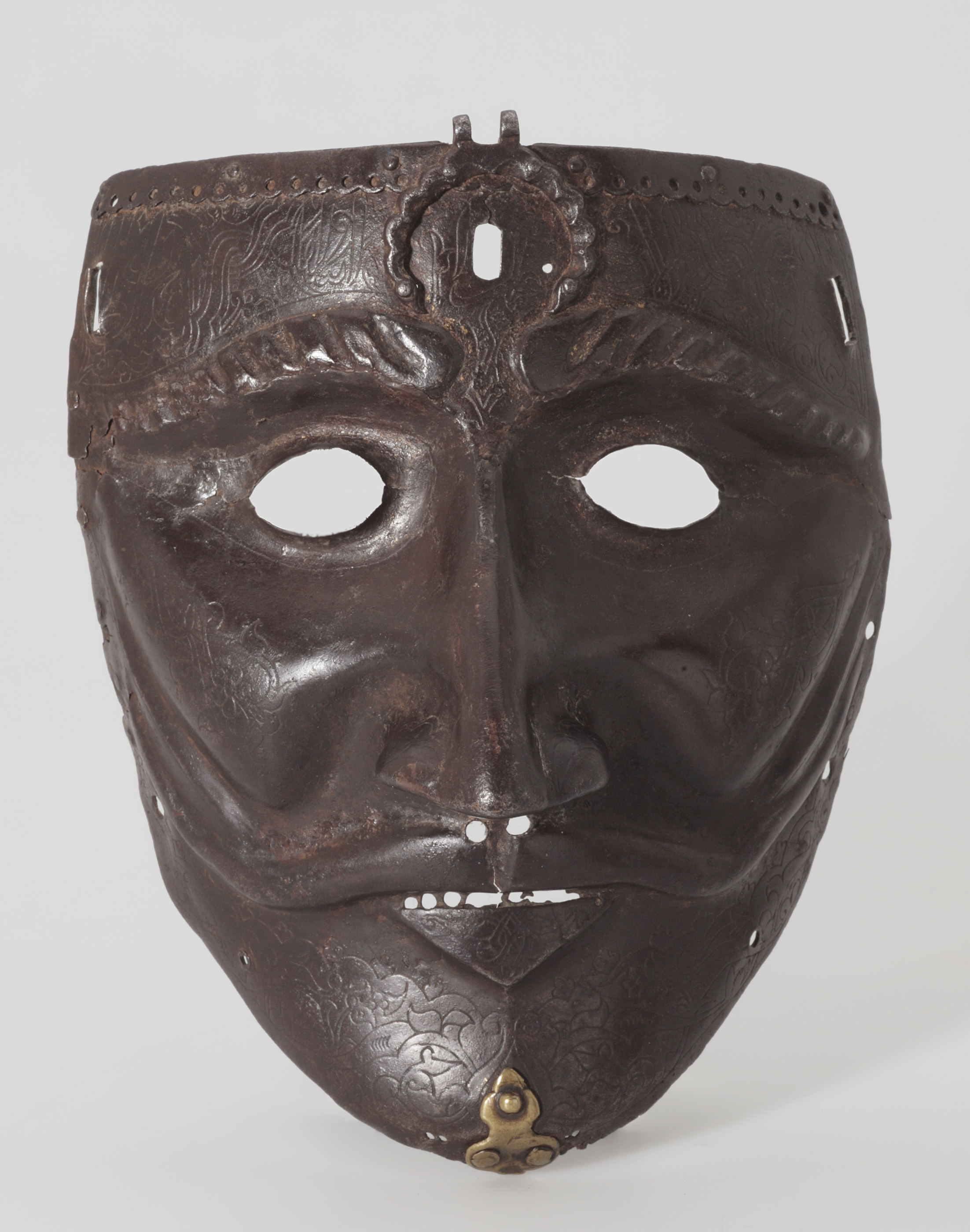
War mask, late 15th century

Critics described Empire of the Sultans as broad and informative. Reviewing the Geneva exhibition for the Financial Times, Susan Moore observed that "no other single collection outside Istanbul has the range of material" to put on such a wide-ranging overview of Ottoman culture. She identified its main achievement as showing how the Ottoman world was affected by its conquest of other territories. The Middle East magazine said the Brunei Gallery offered a "beautifully curated" show that "cleverly illustrates how art was an integral part of Ottoman daily life". The Columbian concluded from the Portland exhibition that "Nasser D. Khalili's collection of Islamic art treasures is so extensive it nearly brings the Ottoman Empire to life." The New York Times described "[t]his treasure trove of a show" at the Bruce Museum as having "an impressive sweep".

Critics praised the beauty of the exhibited art works. The Albuquerque Tribune described Empire of the Sultans as a "stunning exhibit of treasures of the Ottoman Empire" whose 225 objects "are simply breathtaking". Reviewing for the San Francisco Chronicle, David Bonetti found all the objects "at least interesting" and the best "gorgeous", naming the carpets and ceramics as highlights. For The Capital Times, Kevin Lynch described the Milwaukee exhibition as a "serenely gorgeous show" and "a must-see for those who want clarity in these troubling times." In his review of the year for 2002, Lynch named Empire of the Sultans as the fourth best visual arts event. Reviewing the London exhibition for The Times, John Russell Taylor found it a pity that some of the most interesting objects shown in Geneva had been excluded from the Brunei Gallery (usually for lack of space), but said that the somewhat reduced display still included "many real gems of significant art".

The calligraphy, in particular, attracted praise. The Associated Press wrote that its beauty could be appreciated even by visitors who do not understand Arabic writing. Alan Riding in The New York Times described the calligraphy from the later years of the Ottoman Empire as "works of extraordinary delicacy". In The Oklahoman, John Brandenburg named the calligraphy section as the strongest part of the exhibition, saying that the "magnificent blend of art and science as well as military and cultural history" may require more than one visit to take in. The Atlanta Journal-Constitution highlighted the "superb" calligraphy as well as "wonderful" miniature paintings.

Empire of the Sultans was described as showing Islam in a way that contrasted with existing prejudices and with current media coverage. Describing the Brigham Young University exhibition as a "[p]art decorative art extravaganza, part cultural history lesson", The Salt Lake Tribune praised it for sharing the artistic culture of the Islamic world at a time when news mentions of Islam were dominated by war in the Middle East. The US senator John Edwards said of the North Carolina exhibition in 2002, "Since Sept. 11, Americans have been asking more questions [...] about Islam and Islamic cultures in general. The Museum of Art's exhibition offers opportunities to enhance our understanding of Islam's rich and varied cultural history, as well as the events happening today." The New Statesman recommended "an unmissable exhibition" that showed Ottoman culture on its own terms rather than following Western preconceptions. The Pittsburgh Post-Gazette saw the exhibition as an alternative both to the way Islam was being portrayed in news reports and to a romanticised view of the Arabic world as mysterious and distant.

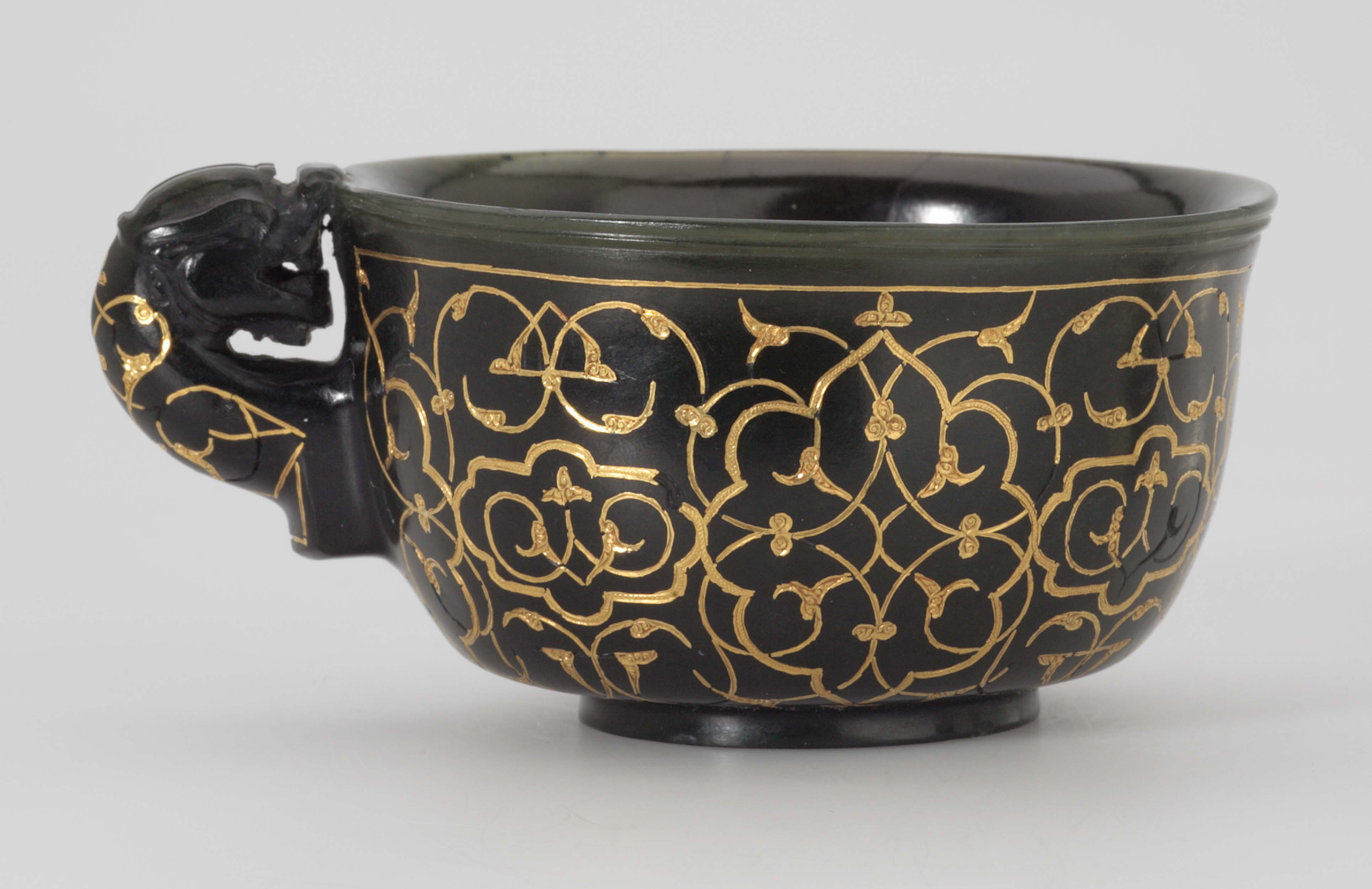
Cup with dragon handle, jade inlaid with gold, late 15th century

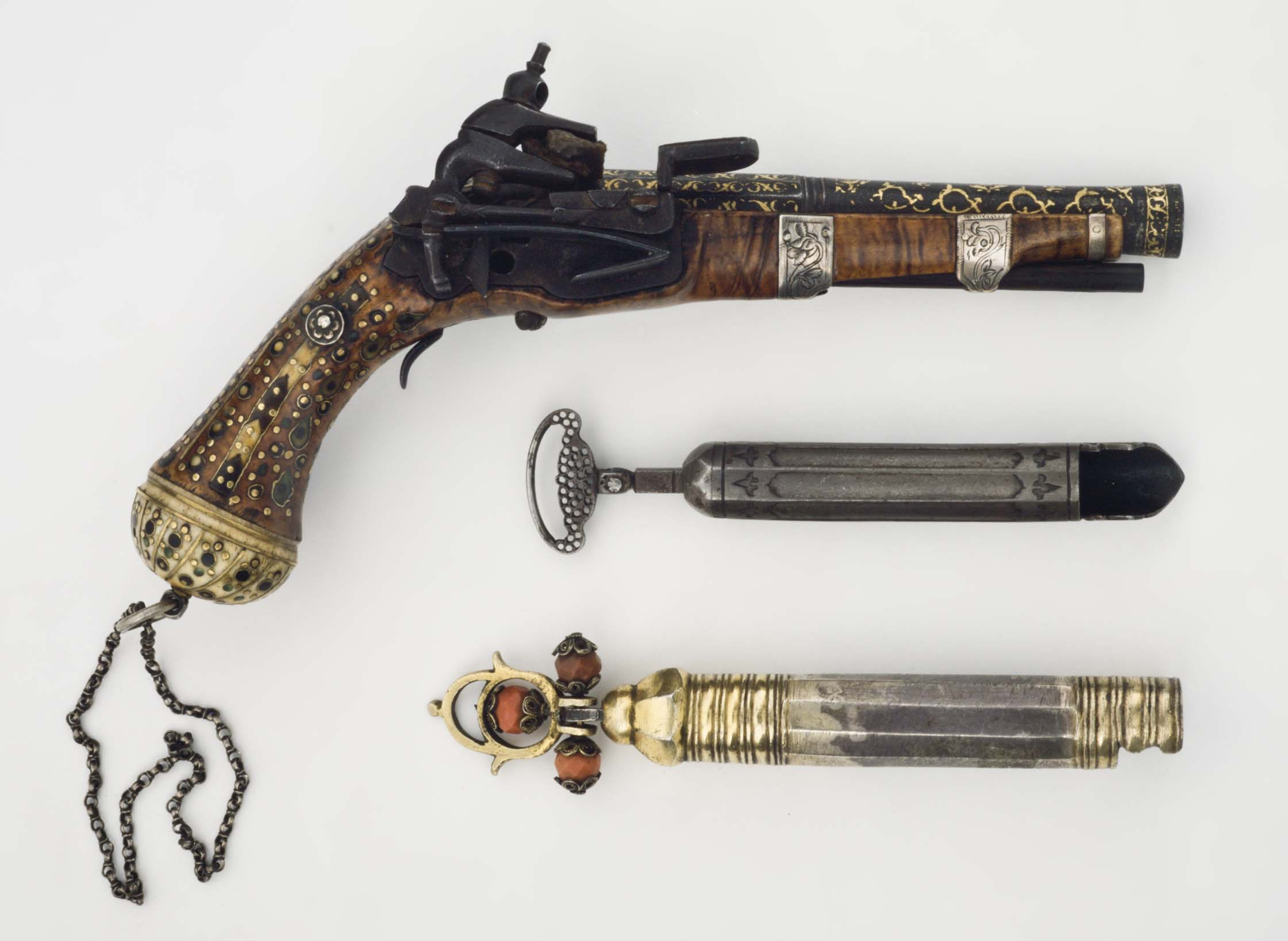
Flintlock pistol, 17th century

=== Publications ===
A catalogue by J. M. Rogers was first published in both English and French in 1995 to coincide with the exhibition at the Musée Rath in Geneva. This included colour photographs of 203 exhibited objects. Updated English editions accompanied the Brunei Gallery exhibition in 1996. Fourth and fifth editions of the catalogue were produced for the United States tour, including 226 objects.

- Rogers, J. M. (1995). Empire of the Sultans: Ottoman Art from the Collection of Nasser D. Khalili. Geneva: Musée d'Art et d'Histoire. ISBN 1-898592-04-7. OCLC 34380041.
- Rogers, J. M. (1995). L'empire des sultans: l'art ottoman dans la collection de Nasser D. Khalili (in French). Geneva: Musée d'Art et d'Histoire. ISBN 9782830601190. OCLC 716306659.
- Rogers, J. M. (1996). Empire of the Sultans: Ottoman art from the collection of Nasser D. Khalili. London: Azimuth Ed. ISBN 9781898592075. OCLC 475490537.
- Rogers, J. M. (2000). Empire of the Sultans: Ottoman art of the Khalili Collection (4 ed.). London: Nour Foundation. ISBN 9780883971321. OCLC 471619620.
