= List of Egyptian musicians =

This is a list of musicians and musical groups from Egypt.

- Abdel Halim Hafiz
- Abou El Leef
- Ahmed Sheba
- Amal Maher
- Amira Selim
- Amr Diab
- Angham
- Anoushka
- Carmen Suleiman
- Dina El Wedidi
- Fatheya Ahmed
- Hisham Abbas
- Leila Mourad
- Mayam Mahmoud
- Mohamed Mounir
- Mohammed Abdel Wahab
- Tamer Hosny
- Ezz Eddin Hosni (1927–2013)
- Mounira El Mahdeya
- Nesma Mahgoub
- Ratiba El-Hefny
- Ruby
- Sayed Darwish
- Shadiya
- Sherine
- Umm Kulthum
- Yasmine Niazy
- Yousra
- Zizi Adel
- Hamid Al Shaeri
