= Nagat El-Sagheera =

Egyptian singer and actress (born 1938)

- نجاة الصغيرة
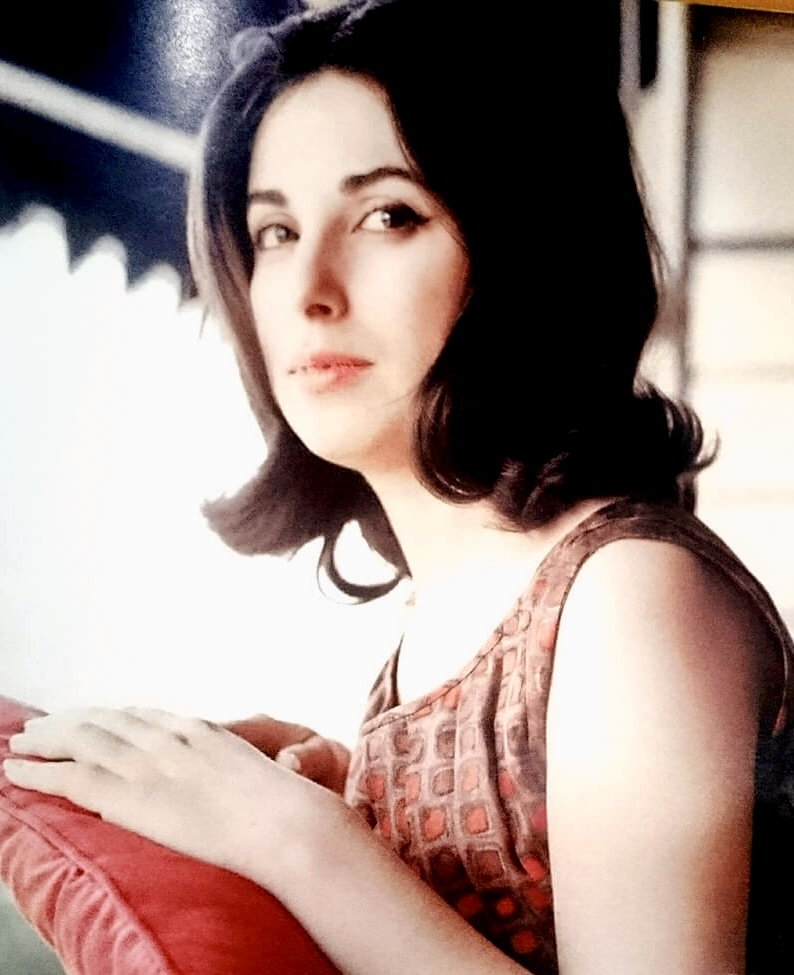
- Nagat in 1960s
- Born: Nagat Mohammad Kamal Hosni نجاة محمد كمال حسني; 11 August 1938 (age 88); Cairo, Kingdom of Egypt
- Occupations: Singer; actress
- Years active: 1943–2002
- Spouses: Kamal Mansy (m. 1955; div. 1960) Houssam El-Din Mustafa (m. 1967; div. 1968)
- Children: 1
- Father: Mohammad Hosni
- Relatives: Soad Hosny (half-sister)

Nagat El-Sagheera (or El Saghirah, Arabic: نجاة الصغيرة; born Nagat Mohammad Kamal Hosni [نجاة محمد كمال حسني], 11 August 1938) is an Egyptian former singer and actress. She retired from filming in 1976 and from singing in 2002. Nagat began her career at the age of five and retired 59 years later.

Nagat's works are a part of Egyptian music from the "golden age" of the 1940s–1960s. She still inspires other Arab artists.

== Early life ==
Nagat El Sagheera was born in Cairo on 11 August 1938, the daughter of prominent Egyptian Arabic calligrapher of Kurdish origin Mohammad Hosni, and an Egyptian mother. Her father was married twice. She grew up in a household that was frequented by leading artists and calligraphers. Nagat was singing at family gatherings from the age of five. She made her first film, Hadiya (released in 1947) at the age of eight.

She is reported to have performed songs by the diva, Umm Kulthum, from the age of 7 years. Along with Umm Kulthum, she was one of a small group of female singers who formed the Egyptian "golden age" of music in the 1940s, 1950s and 1960s.

She was known as al-Saghira, meaning "the small one" or "the young one". She gained many fans after releasing the song, Irja Ilyya (Return to Me), based on a poem by Nizar Qabbani whose sister had committed suicide rather than enter into an arranged marriage. The song's feminist lyrics struck a chord with fans. During the 1970s, Nagat added original lines to the song during 1970s' performances, demonstrating her capacity for "inspired interpretation".

In a recorded interview, in the mid-1960s for Egyptian TV with the presenter Ms Salwa Hegzi, Nagat stated that she had, at that time, eight brothers and sisters. Lately, some media outlets are indicating double that number; the most frequently mentioned is 17 brothers and sisters. The discrepancy between eight and 17 siblings can be readily explained by the nature of an extended family. Nagat is one of eight siblings (four boys: Ezz Eddin, Nabil, Farooq and Sami; and four girls: Khadiga, Samira, Nagat herself and Afaf) from her father's first marriage; as well as three half-sisters from her father's second marriage to Gawhara (Kawther, Soad, Sabah). Following Gawhara's divorce from Hosni and remarriage to Abdel Monem Hafez, another six children were born (three boys: Jaheer, Jaser and Jalaa; and three girls: Gehan, Janjah and Jeely). The grand total of 17 is made up of eight full siblings; three half-sisters and six step-siblings. In the same interview, Nagat confirmed that she was brought up in a home where most of her brothers and sisters were artists.

== Family ==
Her father's household was known as "the home of the Artists". Leading artists from across the Arab world regularly visited Hosni's home in Khan el-Khalili, Cairo. He nurtured his children's talents and encouraged them to pursue careers in the performing and visual arts. Many of his children became artists in their own rights. His son, Ezz Eddin Hosni (1927–2013) was a noted composer and taught Nagat music and singing. Another brother, son Sami Hosni became a cello player, jewellery designer and calligrapher. Her other brother, Farooq, was a painter whose daughter, Samira, would also later become an actress. The Egyptian actress Soad Hosni (1943–2001) was Nagat's half-sister.

== Marriages ==
Nagat had two marriages. Her first marriage was at young age, in 1955, when she was 16 (or 17) years old to an Egyptian man called Kamal Mansi who was a friend of her brother. She divorced him around 1960 and remarried in 1967. Nagat also divorced from her second husband, Egyptian film director Houssam El-Din Mustafa (1926–2000), shortly afterwards and has remained single to date. Media reports suggest that she made a decision to devote her life to raising her only child, Waleed, from her first marriage, and to her work.

== Vocal development and style ==
In the first 10 years of her singing career, Nagat imitated other singers. Renowned Egyptian journalist Fekry Abaza (1896–1979) demanded that the State should support the young and gifted Nagat. According to her family that period "trained" her voice. However, in 1949, the iconic Egyptian music composer Mohamed Abdel Wahab (1902–1991) actually filed an official complaint at the Police station against Nagat's father. He claimed that such training hindered the natural process of her voice development and that she should be left alone to develop freely without it.

Nagat broke away from imitating other singers when she released her own first song in 1955 at the age of 16 years. In the above-mentioned 1960s interview, Nagat herself indicated her first song was "Why did you allow me to love you?" Thereafter she released several other songs for Radio stations. Each song had a duration of 7 to 8 minutes. She began to deliver "long-duration" songs. All of these songs tell a story and typically had a length of 20–40 minutes in studio recordings. In order to keep her audience for the longer songs on stage, Nagat turned her attention to people like Nizar Qabbani. His classic poetic styles combine simplicity and elegance in exploring themes of love and feminism. She has sung at least four of his poems, all of which were composed by Abdul Wahab.

These long-duration songs met with definite success, which critics have attributed to her rigorous training, lengthy rehearsals in the recording studios and endurance during on-stage performance. In total, Nagat El Sagheera may have recorded more than 200 songs; top 53 of which are available on Apple's iTunes web site

She built on this success in subsequent years, despite the difficulty of finding new outstanding poems and corresponding music compositions. To combat this shortage, she was forced to rely on her own abilities in performance. For example, in 1976, at the age of 37, she performed several songs in her last film "Dried Tears". One of these songs was "Mata?" derived from the poem written by Nizar Qabbani with music by Abdul Wahab. In the years that followed, Nagat sang it several times on stage, extending the delivery of the song from below 10 minutes in the film to about one hour on the stage.

== Recognition and legacy ==
Nagat's stage performances are at the core of her legacy. Kamal Al Taweel (1922–2003), one of her distinguished collaborators, indicated in a TV interview that as far as music composers were concerned Nagat El Saghira was the best performer in the Arab world.

Mohamed Abdel Wahab, the most prominent 20th-century Egyptian composer, felt his works were safest with Nagat. He described her as "the owner of the loud silence"!

Nizar Qabbani (1923–1998) a Syrian diplomat and one of the most revered contemporary poets in the Arab world said in a TV interview that he hoped to attract some 15 thousand readers when he published a book of poetry, but when Nagat sang one of his poems it attracted millions in the Arab-speaking world. He also said “… I believe she (Nagat) is the best among those who sang and expressed my poems”.

Nagat’s 1960s–1970s songs, including those in films and stage performances are the core of her legacy. The popularity of her stage performances remained undiminished right up to her retirement in 2002.

In 2006, she was awarded the Owais Cultural Award in recognition of her leading artistic career in the world of song.

== Films ==
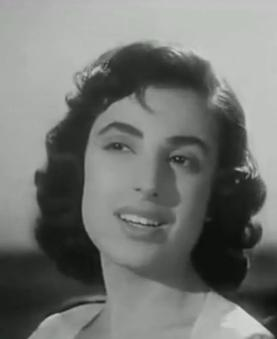
Nagat in Stranger (1958)

Nagat starred in 13 Egyptian movies before retiring from acting in 1976, at only 37 years old. Her most prominent film is Ezz El-Dine Zulficar's Black Candles. Nearly all of her films contained songs performed by her, and one of her most popular performances is an Egyptian rural dialect song called "Ama Barawa".

The best of these films are those where she has the starring role (top five of listed films below are available on YouTube);

- 1958: Stranger
- 1962: Black Candles
- 1966: Beach of Fun
- 1969: Seven Days in Heaven
- 1971: My Dear Daughter
- 1976: Dried Tears

== Music ==
Many well-known Arabic music composers of the 20th century worked with Nagat El Sahgeera such as;

- Mohamed Abdel Wahab (1902–1991) who composed her best hits including "Do not lie", "In the hour when I see you beside me" and "Mata?”
- Kamal El Taweel (1922–2003) who composed "Live with me”
- Baleegh Hamdi (1932–1993) who composed "I am waiting for you".
- Sayed Mekawy (1927–1997) who composed "It makes a big difference".
- Mohammad El Mougi (1923–1995) who composed "Eyes of the heart".
- Mahmood El Sherif (1912–1990) who in 1955 composed for her the brilliant song "Thirsty" on loving the Nile river which was written by Morsi Jameel Aziz.
- Ezz Eddin Hosni (1927–2013) (Nagat's brother) who composed for her "On your wing my bird I will tie my message" which was written by Mohammad Al Bahteeti.
- Composers of other songs: Riad Al Sunbati (1906–1981), Hilmy Bakr (born 1937) as well as Zakariyya Ahmad (1896–1961).

== Words ==
The list of song-writing collaborators may have been larger than the amount of composers she worked with.

Nagat El Sagheera kick-started the 1960's with her first long-duration song "Does he think I am a toy in his two hands? (or in short Arabic: “Ayadhonu”)”. It was written by Nizar Qabbani and composed by Abdul Wahab. An intriguing photo of an archived 1960 letter by Qabbani, addressed to Nagat El Saghira when he was on a diplomatic mission in China, circulated in the media upon its discovery. In the letter, he pressed her to send him a recording of the song upon its release. It was his first song with her and an immediate huge success.

Besides Nizar Qabbani, other famous Arabic poets and song writers of the 20th century also obliged Nagat; such as Maamoun Shennawi (1914–1994) who wrote "Your love is my life". Others included his brother, Kamal Shennawi (1908–1965) who wrote "Do not lie" and Abdel Rahman el-Abnudi who described her warm and soft voice as "diamond-like".

Nagat, who herself confirms in a 1960s interview, always sought quality in words. She was extremely cautious with and meticulous in her choice of lyrics. For example, she replaced several words and even possibly removed more than one line from “Mata?” the original poem by Nizar Qabbani before she agreed to perform it.

== Competition ==
Nagat El Sagheera emerged at a time when the field was already crowded with formidable competitors. However, from the start of the 1960's, Nagat El Sagheera quickly became regarded as her own category.

== Awards ==
Nagat was honoured and given prizes numerous times.

- In 1960s, Egyptian President Gamal Abdul Nasser (1918–1970) awarded her a high ranking Medal.
- Due to her popularity in Tunisia, two Tunisian presidents, Habib Bourguiba (1903–2000) and later Zine El Abidine Ben Ali (born 1936) gave her awards.
- In 1985, King Hussain of Jordan (1935–1999) gave her the First Degree Medal of Independence.
- In 2006, some four years after her retirement, she won the prize for "Those Who Gave People Happiness" in Dubai. She was handed a Gold Medal and US$100,000.

== Latest ==
Nagat El Sagheera has not been seen on screen or in public since 2006, and rather chose a religious and quiet life.

In 2010, a reporter confirmed that she still lives in her native Cairo but travels to London in summer for medical treatment.

In 2014, at the age of 74, she made a phone call to an Egyptian TV station. She was talking from Germany where she was receiving medical treatment.

In 2015 (January), Nagat El Sagheera refused substantial monetary offers from TV channels for her participation in a proposed TV series on her half-sister Soad Hosni.

In 2015 (spring), social media chatter indicated Nagat was receiving physiotherapy and there were some concerns about her health.

In 2022, her music appeared in the mini-series OST, Moon Knight.

in January 2024, she was invited to attend the Joy Awards in Riyadh and sang Oyoun El Alb, her signature song before getting honored for her lifelong career.

== See also ==
- fr:Najet Essaghira
