= Ohannes Mühendisyan =

Ottoman Armenian Typographer

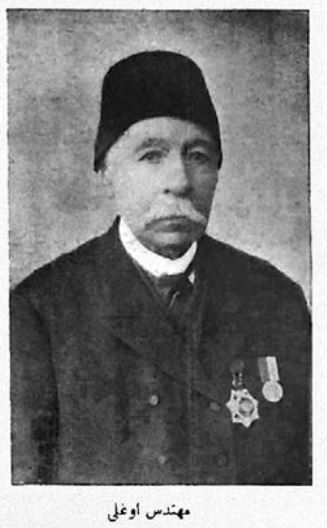
Muhendisyan in April, 1891.

Ohannes Mühendisyan (also spelled Hovhannes and Müehendisoglu in Turkish and Müehendiszade in Ottoman Persian; 1810–1891) was an Armenian typographer and engraver working in Istanbul. He is notable for having pioneered the flattened ج ح خ forms (ـجـ ـحـ ـخـ) in type, as necessitated for printing the Arabic script with the technology available at the time.

== Biography ==
After completing schooling at 15, he apprenticed at a jeweller. He began creating type in 1839 without prior introduction, starting with producing lower case Armenian type first published in an almanac in 1840 at a press located in a seminary in Üsküdar. In 1843, he was invited by the Ottoman Imperial Printing House Takvim-hane-i Amire to create Nastaliq-style typefaces for Turkish, a complex project that took a number of years. At this time he moved with his equipment to Çukur Çeşme Han. He also fulfilled many other printing orders, such as printing banknotes, which he was able to execute with presses imported from the US and France. He crafted a naskh typeface for Arabic based on manuscripts of Mustafa Izzet Efendi, and presented his family of naskh fonts to Sultan Abdul Hamid II in 1888.
