= Abdel Rahman el-Abnudi =

Egyptian poet and writer (1938–2015)

- عبد الرحمن الأبنودي
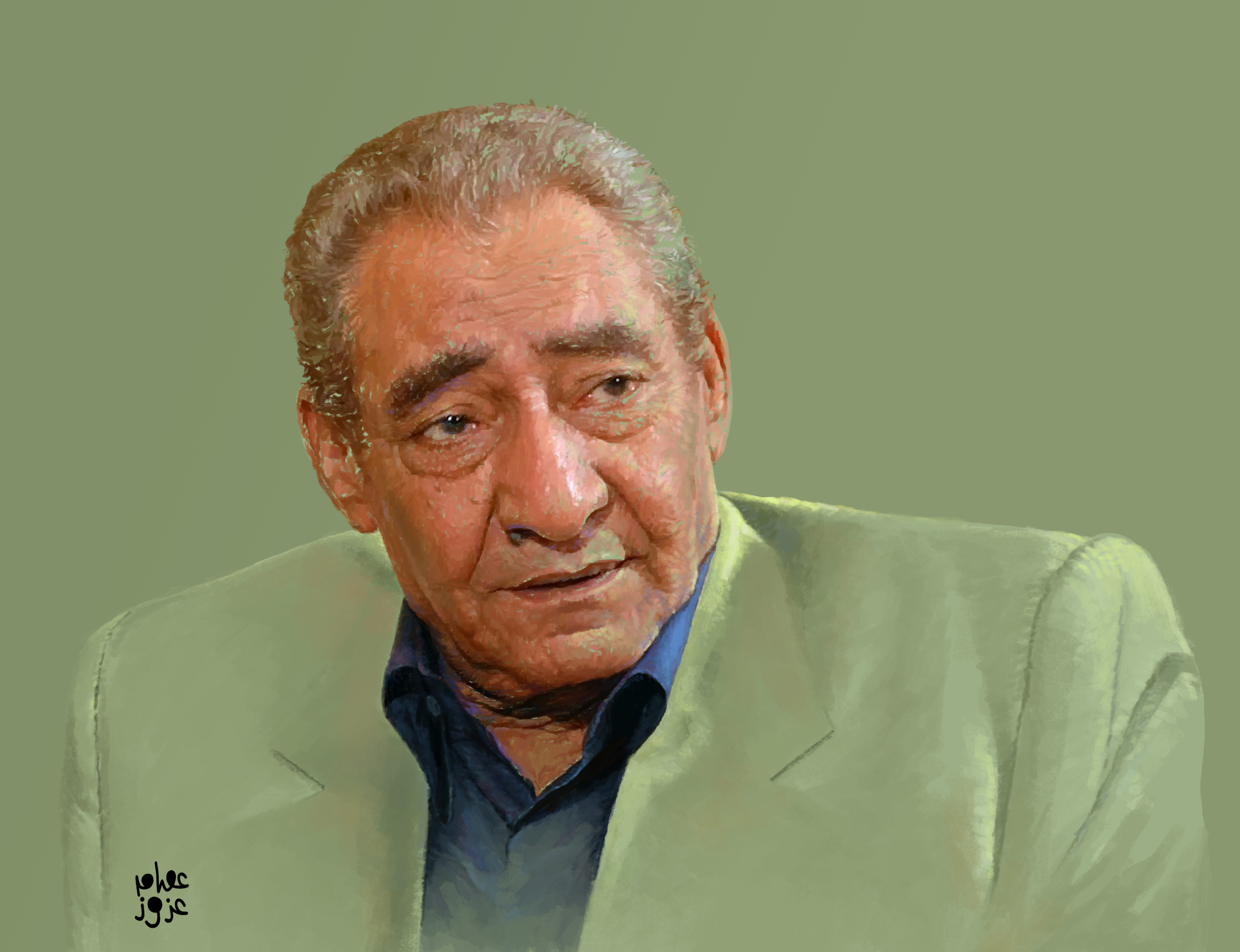
- Born: 11 April 1938; Abnud, Qena, Egypt
- Died: 21 April 2015 (aged 77)

Abdel Rahman el-Abnudi (Arabic: عبد الرحمن الأبنودي, romanized: ʻAbd ir-Raḥmān il-Abnūdī, 11 April 1938 – 21 April 2015) was a popular Egyptian poet, and later a children's books writer. He was one of a generation of poets who favored to write their work in the Egyptian dialect (in Abnudi's case, Upper Egyptian dialect) rather than Standard Arabic, the formal language of the state. This literary stance was associated with a militant political engagement: Abnudi and other Egyptian writers of this school sought to make their literary production part of the process of political development and movement towards popular democracy in Egypt.

== Life ==
He was born in the village of Abnud in Upper Egypt. He wrote his first poetry when he was a high school student. In 1958, he traveled to Cairo. First of his works were published in the weekly magazine Sabah al-Khayr. In 1961, he moved to Cairo where he worked as a songwriter. He married the former President of the Egyptian Television Network and television presenter and interviewer Nehal Kamal, and they had two children: Aya and Nour.

== Works ==
Many of his works have been set to music by composers including Ezz Eddin Hosni and performed by popular singers such as Abd El Halim, Nagat el Saghera, Shadia, Sabah, Majida El Roumi, Mohamed Mounir and others.

- El-Mot ala el-Asfalt (الموت على الأسفلت, Al-Mawt ʻalá al-Asfalt, 'Death on the Asphalt') – named in the top 100 African books of the 20th century at the 2001 Zimbabwe International Book Fair.
- Jawabat Haraji il-Gutt (Sa'idi Arabic: جوابات حراجى القط, romanized: Jawābāt Ḥarājī il-Guṭṭ, lit. 'Letters of Haraji the Cat'; – written in the form of an epistolary novel the work comprises letters exchanged between Haraji, a worker on the Aswan Dam and his wife at home. the poems explore the theme of Homesickness and longing to family and loved ones written from both the perspective of the man working far from home and his family back home, the poems resonated deeply with the Egyptian public specially after the open door policy when many Egyptian youth left the country to work abroad.
- El Siral Hilaliyah (Sa'idi Arabic: السيرة الهلالية, romanized: el sīra el Hilaliya, lit. 'The Epic Of Hilali (tribe)'; 1980s) – is an Arabic Saidi epic poem about Banu Hilal and their journey across Arabia and north Africa recollected in 5 volumes and edited by him from different poets of Upper Egypt. For this work he was claimed as "Homer of Arabs" by some of his biographers.

== Most famous poetry ==
- The allowed and prohibited
- Death on the asphalt
- Charged with forest cat
- Earth and the children
- The silence of the bell

== Songs for many singers ==
- Abdel Halim Hafez: Your son is proud of you (Egyptian Arabic: "Ebnak Yoalak Ya Batal"), Every Time I Say I Repent (Et Touba), Love is Mine (El Hawa Hawaya), The Embracement of Lovers (Ahdan EL Habayeb), The Day Has Passed (Adda El Nahar), The Christ (El Maseeh) and many other songs.
- Mohamed Rushdie: Under The Trees (Taht El Shagar).
- Najat Al Saghira: The Eyes of The Heart (Eyon EL Alb).
- Shadia: Ya Asmarany el loon .
- Sabah (singer) : Sometimes (Saat Saat).
- Warda Al-Jazairia: Lovers of course (Tabaan Ahbab).
- Majida El Roumi: From Beirut (Mn Bairout), I love you Egypt (Bahoaki Ya Masr).
- Mohamed Mounir: Chocolate (Shokolata), All Things Reminds me (Kol EL Hagat), I am not Innocent (Msh Baryi2), Outside Windows (Barrah EL Shababeek), A Summer Moon (Amar Seify), Younis, My Heart doesn't seem like me (Alby Mayshbehnish), Oh Bird (Ya Hamam)
- Cairokee: Ehna el shaab (We are the People)

== See also ==
- Ahmed Fouad Negm
- Salah Jaheen
