= Mohammad Hosni =

Egyptian master calligrapher

Mohammad Hosni محمد حسني
- Born: Mohammad Kamal Hosni; 1894; Cairo, Egypt
- Died: June 6, 1969 (aged 74–75); Cairo, United Arab Republic (present-day Egypt)
- Other name: Mohammad Kamal Hosni Elbaba
- Citizenship: Egyptian
- Occupation: Calligrapher
- Years active: 1905–1969
- Children: 11, including Soad and Nagat

Mohammad Hosni, also known as Mohammad Kamal Hosni Elbaba (Arabic: محمد حسني البابا), was an Egyptian master calligrapher, at the Royal Institute of Calligraphy in Cairo. He was one of the last of the classical calligraphers, who is noted for making a number of improvements to the lettering. He excelled in the Thuluth school of calligraphy. His father was of Kurdish descent.

== Early life ==
Born in 1894 in Cairo, Egypt. His father, Hosni al-Baba, was a Syrian singer; his brother was the Syrian artist Anwar al-Baba, known as "Umm Kamel". He was fond of calligraphy from his early childhood, and he migrated to Egypt at the age of 19, where he became a national. Mohammad Hosni received his initial formal training with the Turkish master, Istanbul-based Yousef Rasa (d. 1915) who had renovated the Umayyad Mosque in Damascus at the turn of the 20th century. Yousef Rasa was commissioned by the Ottoman Caliph, Abdul Hameed to prepare the calligraphy of the Umayyad Mosque in Damascus during its restoration, which is how Hosni and Rasa met. Hosni later studied with Mohammad Shawqi (also known as Mehmed Şevkî Efendi).

At the age of only 18, in 1912, Hosni migrated with his father to Cairo in Egypt, where he studied and lived his entire life, and was later naturalized as an Egyptian

== Life and career ==
He moved to Cairo as a youngster in 1912, where he studied and later became a master calligrapher at the "Royal Institute of Calligraphy". He wrote thousands of frames for the “silent movies”, book headers and many other publications.

In the 1920s, he purchased a house in Cairo's Khan el Khalili district and initially worked from there. By 1929, at the age of 35 years; he had opened his own office and workshop. His works found favour with several prominent persons, Egyptian prime minister Ismail Sidqi (1875-1950) and Yousef Thu Al Fiqar (father of queen Farida) and others. They retained Hosni to prepare their personal and business cards. He worked on improving the linear structure of Arabic script and improving all types of calligraphy.

His house in Khan el-Khalili was known as the "artists' house". Leading artists from across the Arab world regularly visited him, whether for private tuition or for social interaction with the master calligrapher. His children, who grew up in an artistic household and whose talents were nurtured from a very young age, often performed for the family as well as Hosni's guests and many of his children went on to have careers in the visual and performing arts.

Hosny was the first professor to be appointed by King Farouk, to teach at the new Royal School of Calligraphy when it was formed in 1922. His fame brought him in contact with some of the most renowned calligraphers of Egypt and the Arab world; including Najeeb Al Hawaweeni (shown in the 1946 photo, sitting second on the right). In 1944, he certified the renowned Iraqi master calligrapher Hashim Mohammad Al Khatat Al Baghdadi (1917-1973), who became a regular visitor to Hosni's home and also correspondended with Hosni throughout his life.

By 1958, Hosni was widely regarded as one of the leading Islamic calligraphers. In 1965, he was awarded an honorary doctorate in calligraphy in Canada, a year after his death in 1964.

Samples from his work can be seen on several web sites and books including some of his master frameworks and few of his greatest in the Thuluth.

== Family life ==
He married two women with whom he had eleven children;

* Eight with his first wife; four boys (Ezz Eddin, Nabil, Farooq and Sami) and four girls (Khadiga, Samira, Nagat, Afaf).
* Three with his second wife; three girls (Kawthar, Soad, Sabah).

Two of his daughters became popular actors and singers. Nagat, known as Nagat El-Sagheera (born 1938) and Soad Hosni (1943-2001) both became singers and were super-stars in the Arab world. Another daughter, Samira, was a minor actress.

His son, Ezz Eddin Hosni (1927–2013), was a music composer, with credits for some 100 songs, and taught his sister Najat music and singing. Another son, Sami Hosni, was a cellist, jewelry designer and calligrapher. His son Farooq was a painter and his daughter Samira was an actress.

== Latest ==
In 2011, Egyptian master calligrapher Khudair al-Borsaidi said he met Mohammad Hosni in 1958 and that Mohamed Hosni was his “first teacher”.

In 2012, Arabic Calligraphy Exhibition in Cairo (organized by Senari House in Sit Zainab, Cairo) showed the original of one of his frameworks for the first time. This particular work of Hosni was owned by artist Hamdi Al Sharif; a student of Hosni.
