= Libyan Arab Airlines Flight 114 =

1973 Israeli shootdown of an airliner

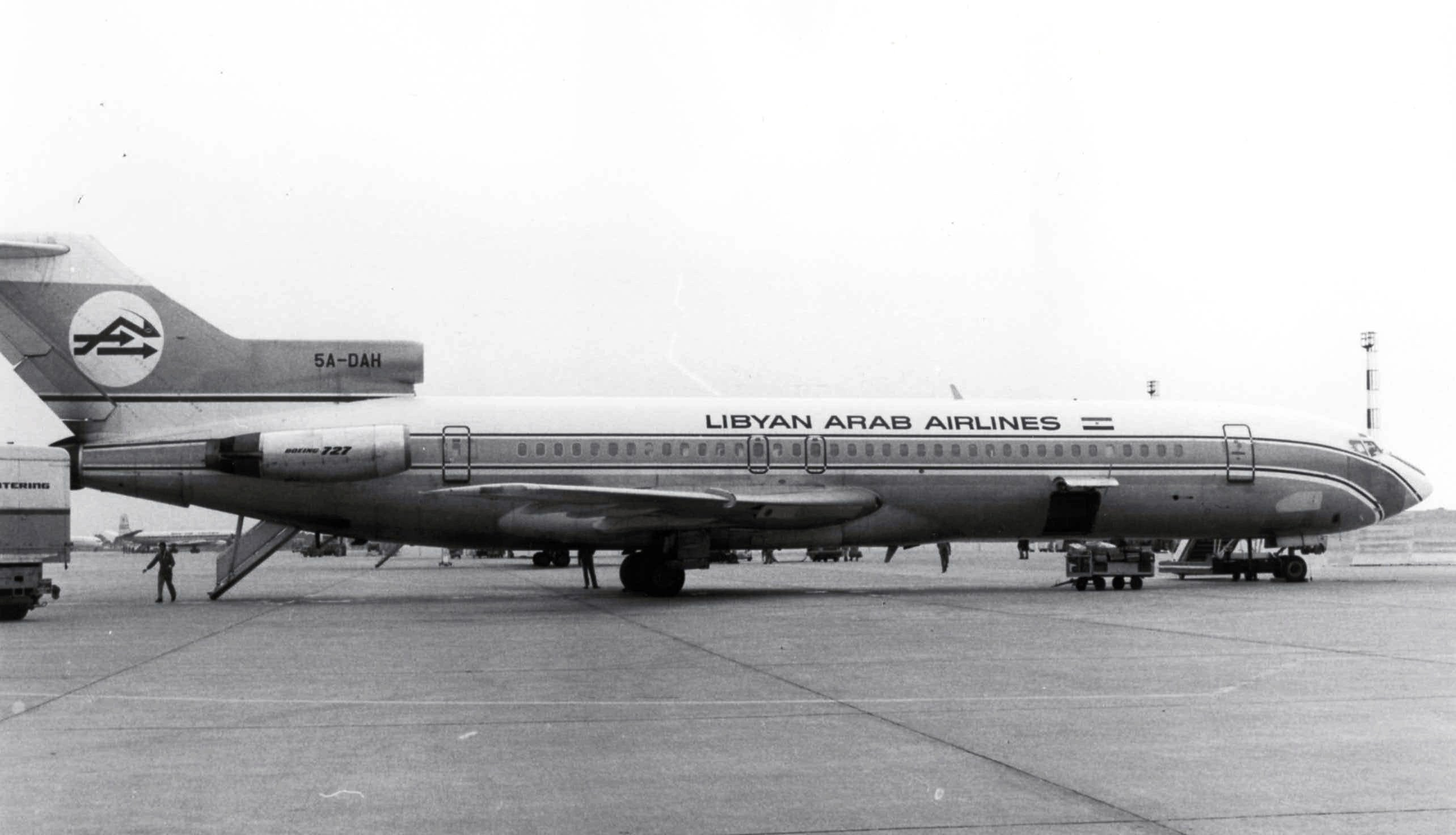
- 5A-DAH, the Boeing 727 involved in the incident, in 1972

Shootdown
- Date: 21 February 1973
- Summary: Airliner shootdown
- Site: Israeli-occupied Sinai Peninsula; 30.3444°N 32.6761°E

Aircraft
- Aircraft type: Boeing 727–224
- Operator: Libyan Arab Airlines
- Registration: 5A-DAH
- Flight origin: Tripoli International Airport, Tripoli, Libya
- Stopover: Benghazi Airport, Benghazi, Libya
- Destination: Cairo International Airport, Cairo, Egypt
- Occupants: 113
- Passengers: 104
- Crew: 9
- Fatalities: 108
- Injuries: 5
- Survivors: 5

Libyan Arab Airlines Flight 114 was a regularly scheduled international passenger flight from Tripoli, Libya, to Cairo, Egypt, through Benghazi in Libya. The flight was shot down on 21 February 1973 by two Israeli McDonnell Douglas F-4 fighter jets after it mistakenly entered the airspace of Egypt's Sinai Peninsula – then under Israeli occupation – resulting in the death of 108 passengers and crew, with 5 survivors.

The Boeing 727-200 left Tripoli and flew to Benghazi for its scheduled stopover. After taking off from Benghazi, it became lost because of a combination of bad weather and equipment failure over Northern Egypt. The aircraft entered Israeli controlled airspace and territory over the Sinai Peninsula, where it was intercepted by two Israeli F-4s. It was then shot down by the Israeli fighter pilots with the authorisation of David Elazar, chief of staff of the Israeli Defense Forces.

The downing of the plane earned unanimous international criticism: both the Soviet Union and the United States condemned the incident, not accepting the reasoning given by Israel; all member-nations of the International Civil Aviation Organization voted to censure Israel for the attack. Israel's Defense Minister, Moshe Dayan, called it an "error of judgment", and Israel paid compensation to the victims' families.

== Background ==
=== Aircraft ===
The aircraft involved, manufactured in 1968, was a Boeing 727-224 registered as 5A-DAH with serial number 20244 and line number 650. It was equipped with three Pratt & Whitney JT8D-9 engines and in its five years of service, it had logged 4526 airframe hours.

=== Crew ===
There was a crew of nine on board the aircraft. Five crew members were French, including the pilot-in-command, 41-year-old Jacques Bourges. He had logged 11,926 hours of flying time, only 550 of which were logged on the 727. His Libyan co-pilot was 33-year-old First Officer Ayad Nebai Younis. The total hours of his flight time was undetermined but he had logged 405 hours of flying time on the 727. The French flight engineer was 45-year-old R. Nandin. He had logged 18,777 hours of flying time, 1,448 of which were logged on the 727. The crew were contracted to Air France and Libyan Arab Airlines.

== Timeline ==
Libyan Arab Airlines Flight 114 was an international scheduled Tripoli–Benghazi–Cairo passenger service operated with a Boeing 727–224. After a brief stop in Benghazi, the aircraft departed the city at 10:40 GMT and continued to Cairo with 113 people on board. Most of the passengers were Arabs, but there were also two Germans and an American on board.

Normally, the Benghazi–Cairo route was flown eastwards along the Libyan coast until reaching the city of Sidi Barrani in Egypt, where the airway turned inland to the VHF omnidirectional range (VOR) and non-directional beacon (NDB) area located west of Lake Qarun. The entry to the Cairo terminal area was made on a north-easterly heading over a 71-nautical-mile (82 mi; 131 km) long path that separated Lake Qarun from the Cairo VOR. At 13:45, the Cairo traffic control (CTC) saw the aircraft approaching from the west. Permission was granted to land on runway 23. CTC surprisingly saw the Boeing heading eastward towards the Suez Canal at 13:50. Evidence from both the recovered Boeing 727 voice recorders and the Israeli authorities' flight data recorder later showed that the Libyan aircraft was likely off course when it reported its position over Qarun, probably due to strong westerly upper-level winds associated with a low level sandstorm. The crew was forced to rely on instrument navigation because of this sandstorm. Both instrument and navigational error caused the aircraft to go off course, entering Israeli-controlled airspace over the Sinai Peninsula. By this time, the aircraft had been lost by the Egyptian air traffic control. The crew believed they were close to the destination airport and started a descent.

At 13:55, the aircraft was detected on the radar by the Israelis as it was entering Israeli-controlled airspace; it was located south-east of Suez at an altitude of 15,000 feet (4,600 m). Two Israeli Air Force Phantoms were sent to intercept the then-unidentified aircraft. Following the re-establishment of communications with CTC, the French pilot looked through the cabin's port window and saw the fighters, but he mistook them for Egyptian MIGs. It continued flying eastwards into the Sinai at a speed of 325 miles per hour (282 kn; 523 km/h), until the crew realised they had had problems with their instruments and were off their path. At this moment, the French pilot performed a U-turn, in order to leave the Sinai and go back towards Cairo. The Israeli pilots interpreted it as an attempt to flee and, according to them, then tried to make visual contact with the airliner's crew and to communicate with them by signaling with their hands. Still according to the Israelis, the 727's French pilot responded with a hand gesture indicating refusal, signaling his intention to continue back on his way out of Sinai. The fighter-pilots claim to have replied by dipping their wings, but this was once again ignored by the airliner crew. Then, the Israeli Phantoms opened fire on the airliner.

The Israeli Phantom pilots fired bursts from their 20 mm (0.8 in) M61 cannons, severely damaging the airliner's control surfaces, hydraulic systems, and wing structure. Flight 114 attempted an emergency landing but the aircraft hit the top of a sand dune; it bounced hard and a wing section was torn off before the airframe slid down a slope. Thirteen people were still alive in the burning wreckage when Israeli soldiers arrived at the crash site; seven of them still lived two days later. Of the 113 people aboard, 108 died, including the former foreign minister of Libya, Salah Busir, and television presenter Salwa Hegazy.

=== Aftermath ===
Israeli Air Force (IAF) General Mordechai Hod claimed that the co-pilot, who survived the crash, admitted that he understood Israeli signals and chose to "run for it." Hod's claim was met with skepticism by many in the international community, as it was incongruous with both transcripts of tapes recovered from the aircraft and reports that the co-pilot, in critical condition at the time, was still "incoherent." Those doubts were accentuated by the fact that "nobody could believe that a civil aircraft with 113 people on board would ignore orders to land when surrounded by jet fighters" and a number of discrepancies in early Israeli accounts of the incident. The IAF maintained that it saw Flight 114 as a security threat. The Israelis feared that the plane could have been undertaking an aerial spy mission over the Israeli air base at Bir Gifgafa, or that it was on a suicide mission, aiming to plunge into an Israeli city or the Negev Nuclear Research Center.

The Israeli government said Flight 114 was shot down with the authorisation of David Elazar, the IDF chief of staff. Israel's argument was that the heightened security situation and the erratic behaviour of the jet's crew made the attack prudent. Many nations, including the Soviet Union, condemned the attack. The United Nations did not take action against Israel. The 30 member-nations of the International Civil Aviation Organization voted to censure Israel for the attack. The United States did not accept the reasoning given by Israel, and condemned the incident. Israel's Defense Minister, Moshe Dayan, called it an "error of judgment", and Israel paid compensation to the victims' families.

Libyan leader Muammar Gaddafi was enraged by the incident and told Egyptian President Anwar Sadat that he intended to order an attack against Haifa. Sadat restrained him, hinting of war plans for what was to become the Yom Kippur War and warning that such an attack by Libya would likely result in an Israeli reprisal against Libyan airfields that would only damage the ability of Arab nations to launch a combined strike. When the bodies of the victims arrived in Libya, riots erupted in Tripoli and Benghazi. Public outrage was also directed at Egypt over the failure of the Egyptian Air Force to protect the airliner, and Salah Busir's son printed leaflets blaming his father's death on Egyptian cowardice. Two days after the incident, rioters attacked the Egyptian consulate in Benghazi.

Although Sadat had managed to convince Gaddafi to refrain from direct military retaliation, Gaddafi nonetheless attempted to retaliate by other means. The month after the incident, he offered Black September $10 million to blow up an El Al plane with passengers on board. On 4 April 1973, two Black September members were arrested in Rome carrying guns and hand grenades intended to be used in an attack on an El Al plane there. After this failure, Gaddafi decided to attack the Queen Elizabeth 2, which was then embarking on a special cruise from Southampton to Ashdod to commemorate the upcoming 25th anniversary of the Israeli Declaration of Independence with many Jews and other supporters of Israel aboard, among them the wife of Shimon Peres. On 17 April, Gaddafi issued an order to the commander of an Egyptian submarine that had been stationed in Libya under an Egyptian–Libyan joint defense agreement to sink the liner, claiming that under the defense agreement, the submarine and its crew were part of the Libyan armed forces and thus under his jurisdiction. The Egyptian government learned of the plan before it could be carried out. There are conflicting accounts as to how the information reached the Egyptian government, with one account stating that the submarine sent a coded message about its mission to the Egyptian naval base at Alexandria while another states that British planes detected the submarine's movements as it headed towards Malta and contacted the Egyptians. When Sadat was informed, he countermanded the order.

The Israeli Cabinet discussed the incident three times in secret meetings. The minutes, declassified in 2023, show that the main decisions were to deny all responsibility and to refuse to hold an official inquiry. A proposal to establish a standing order against shooting down civilian aircraft was rejected.

== See also ==
- List of airliner shootdown incidents
