= Ezz Eddin Hosni =

Egyptian musician and composer (b. 1927, d. 2013)

- عز الدين حسني
- Born: Ezz Eddin Mohammad Kamal Hosni; 15 June 1927; Bulaq, Cairo, Kingdom of Egypt
- Died: 18 October 2013 (aged 86); Cairo, Egypt
- Burial place: Cairo, Egypt
- Occupation: Composer
- Father: Mohammad Hosni
- Relatives: Nagat El-Sagheera, Soad Hosny (sister)

Ezz Eddin Hosni (15 June 1927 – 18 October 2013) was an Egyptian composer. He is noted for writing tunes performed by some of Egypt's leading singers.

== Life and career ==
Ezz Eddin Hosni was the son of calligrapher Mohammad Hosni, and his first wife, a middle class Egyptian woman. He was the oldest child in what became a very large family. He had three full brothers (Nabil, Farouk and Sami) and four full sisters (Khadega, Samira, Nagat and Afaf); and following his parents' divorce, he had three half-sisters (Kawthar, Soad, Sabah) from his father's second marriage and an additional three young half-brothers (Gaheer, Gasser and Galaa (named after the Egyptian ceremony) plus three half-sisters (Gehan, Janjah and Geely) from his mother's second marriage, giving a total of sixteen siblings. He was from a Syrian Kurdish descent.

He was raised in his father's home in the Khan El-Khalili, Egyptian folk and vibrant district of central Cairo, where Naguib Mahfouz written about. His father's house became known as "the home of the artists." Given his father's reputation as a master Arabic calligrapher and teacher, leading artists and calligraphers usually visited the Hosni home. The children's creative talents were nurtured; their father took them to the theatre, provided them with the best tutors and introduced them to other prominent Egyptian artists. Many of the Hosni children became artists in their own right. Ezz Eddin Hosni was a noted musician and composer; his sisters, Nagat and Souad Hosni both became popular singers appearing in many Arabic films, while another sister, Samira was a minor actress. His brother, Sami Hosni became a cello player, jewellery designer and calligrapher. Yet another brother, Farooq, became a painter.

Around the time of Ezz Eddin's birth, his father, Mohammed Hosni, had a close friendship with the prominent Egyptian oud-maker, Khalil El-Gowhari, who promised to make an instrument for Hosni's first born. When Ezz Eddin was aged six, he came across the oud made for him and began to play. His father soon recognised the boy's talent and found him a teacher who recommended that the boy study the violin because it had greater potential as a career. After completing his secondary education, Ezz Eddin studied at the Fuad Institute of Music where he became a highly accomplished violinist and also learned to play other instruments, including the piano.

As a boy, he was influenced by the prominent Egyptianmusician Riyad al-Sunbati who wrote many songs for the influential Egyptian singer, Umm Kulthum. He was especially fond of the tune, Salwa my heart, performed by Kulthum and based one of his early compositions, Hilal Al Eid on this tune. The tune was broadcast live from a concert at Dar Al Hikma in El Aini Palace and drew a rapturous response from listeners whose appreciation was enhanced with the knowledge that it was the work of a child. Years later, at the age of 19, Umm Kulthum invited him to play with her group, where he was given the opportunity to perform the guitar before Gamal Abdel Nasser, who praised his mastery of the instrument.

He taught two of his younger sisters, Najat and Soad, music and singing and both went on to have prominent careers in music and film. During his sister, Najat's early career, he regularly toured with her. The careers of Ezz Eddin and his sister, Nagat, coincided with a period described as the "golden age of music" in which artists sought to resurrect traditional local melodies and songs.

In his later years, Ezz Eddin wrote a non-fiction work detailing the life of his sister, actress, Suad Hosni, who died in London in 2001 in mysterious circumstances. The aim of his book was to correct rumours which had emerged in the Arabic press about his sister's private life and the cause of her untimely death. His instructions to the family were that the book was only to be published after his own death.

== Work ==
He composed melodies for well-known poems, such as the verse of Abdel Rahman El Abnoudi or Ibrahim Ragab. He wrote many original melodies for his sisters, Najat and Suad as well as for many other Egyptian singers. He also collaborated with prominent musicians such as Mohamed Abdelmutallab, Farid al-Atrash, Mohamed Abdel Wahab, Mohamed Kandil, Alia of Tunisia and others. His style and compositions have been described as "authentic Egyptian" music.

Among his most well-known compositions are:

- Your Right and Sameh
- One Day
- I Still Want to Survive
- Al Asmar Everywhere (written for Shadia)
- I am Free (written for Hoda Sultan)
- Laila Maqrish (written for Laila Mourad)
- I'm Still Your Thing (written for his sister, Suad Hosni)
- On the Edge of Your Wing, O Bath (written for his sister, Suad Hosni)

== See also ==
- List of Egyptian composers
- List of Egyptian musicians
