= Abou El Leef =

Egyptian singer (born 1968)

Abou El Leef أبو الليف
- Born: Nader Anwar Gaber; 1968 (age 56–57); Alexandria, Egypt
- Occupation: Singer
- Years active: 2010–present

Nader Anwar Gaber (Arabic: نادر أنور جابر, pronounced [ˈnæːdeɾ ˈʔɑnwɑɾ ˈɡæːbeɾ]; born 1968) is an Egyptian singer who is popularly known by his stage name Abou El Leef (ابو الليف [æbʊlˈliːf], "Loofahs Person").

== Biography ==
Nader Anwar Gaber was born 1968. He grew up and lived in Cairo, Egypt. Since he was young, he developed a passion for music, and especially for singing. He had to struggle long to prove himself as an artist. His first opportunity came when an anonymous producer helped him record his song "Elostah". "Elostath" was a hit single, included in a variety album Cocktail Sakhen Jeddan including songs by many artists.

As many self-made artists, Abou Elleef disappeared for several years due to particular circumstances like the incapability to fund or record albums. In 2009, he appeared again on the scene with the hit single "Barkouta", praising the soccer player Mohamed Barakat. He soon followed it with another hit single titled "Ettaxi", which was also a success. In 2010, he signed with Melody Music Productions, and together they produced a hit album including a successful single titled "King Kong". The album Khroung was written by Ayman Bahgatt Kamar, composed by Mohamed Yahiya, and distributed by Tomah.

Abou Elleef raised a fuss and critics consider him a phenomenon in Egypt because he divided the public between supporters and opposers. Supporters say he speaks about their daily life, social problems and also provides them relief through his art. Opposers say that he represents a lost generation of young artists who sing nonsense, and has nothing but nice beats.

== Albums ==
- King Kong (2010)
- Khroung
