= Mehmed Şevkî Efendi =

Influential 19th century Ottoman calligrapher

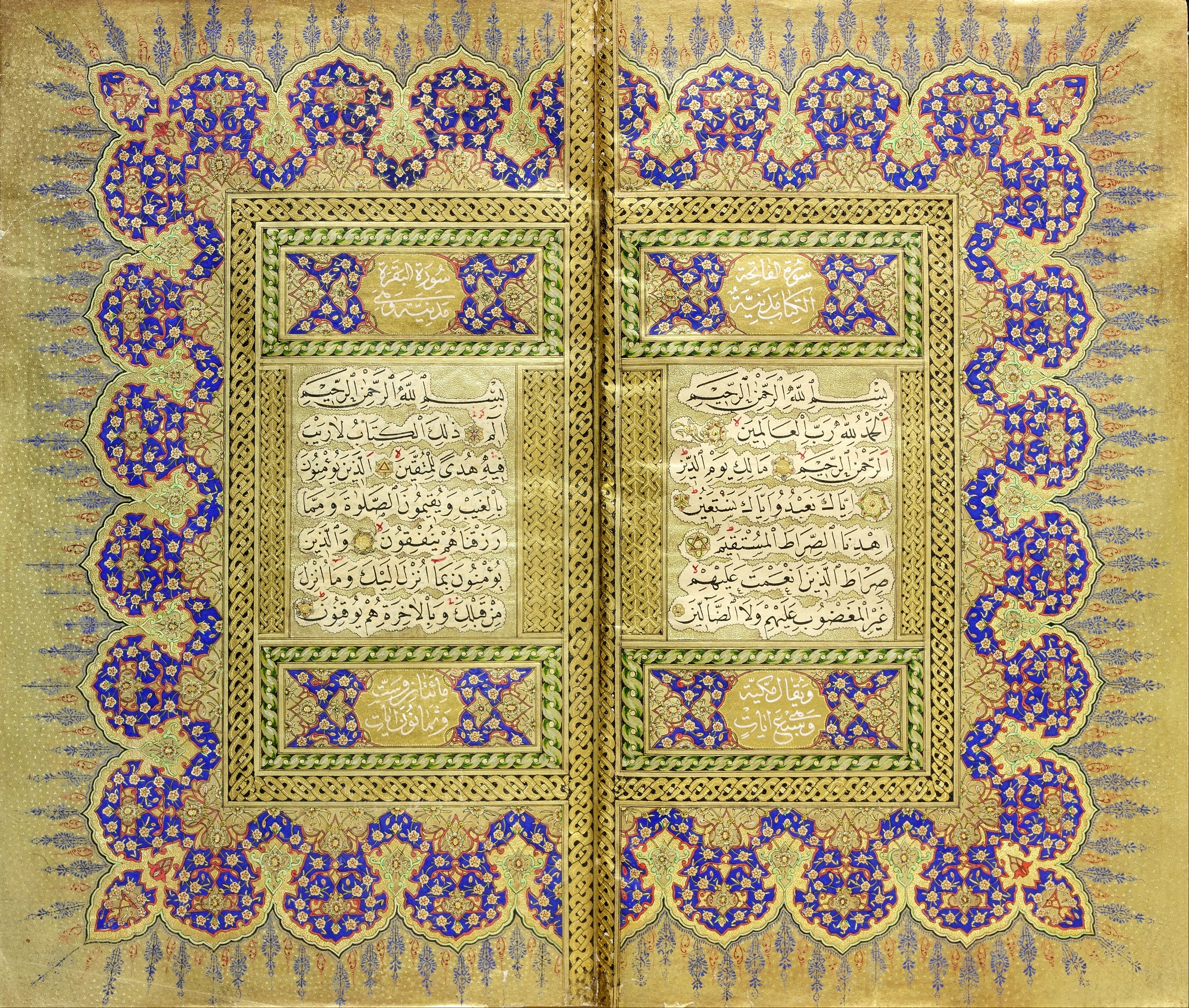
Qur'an copied by Mehmed Şevkî Efendi. Sakıp Sabancı Museum

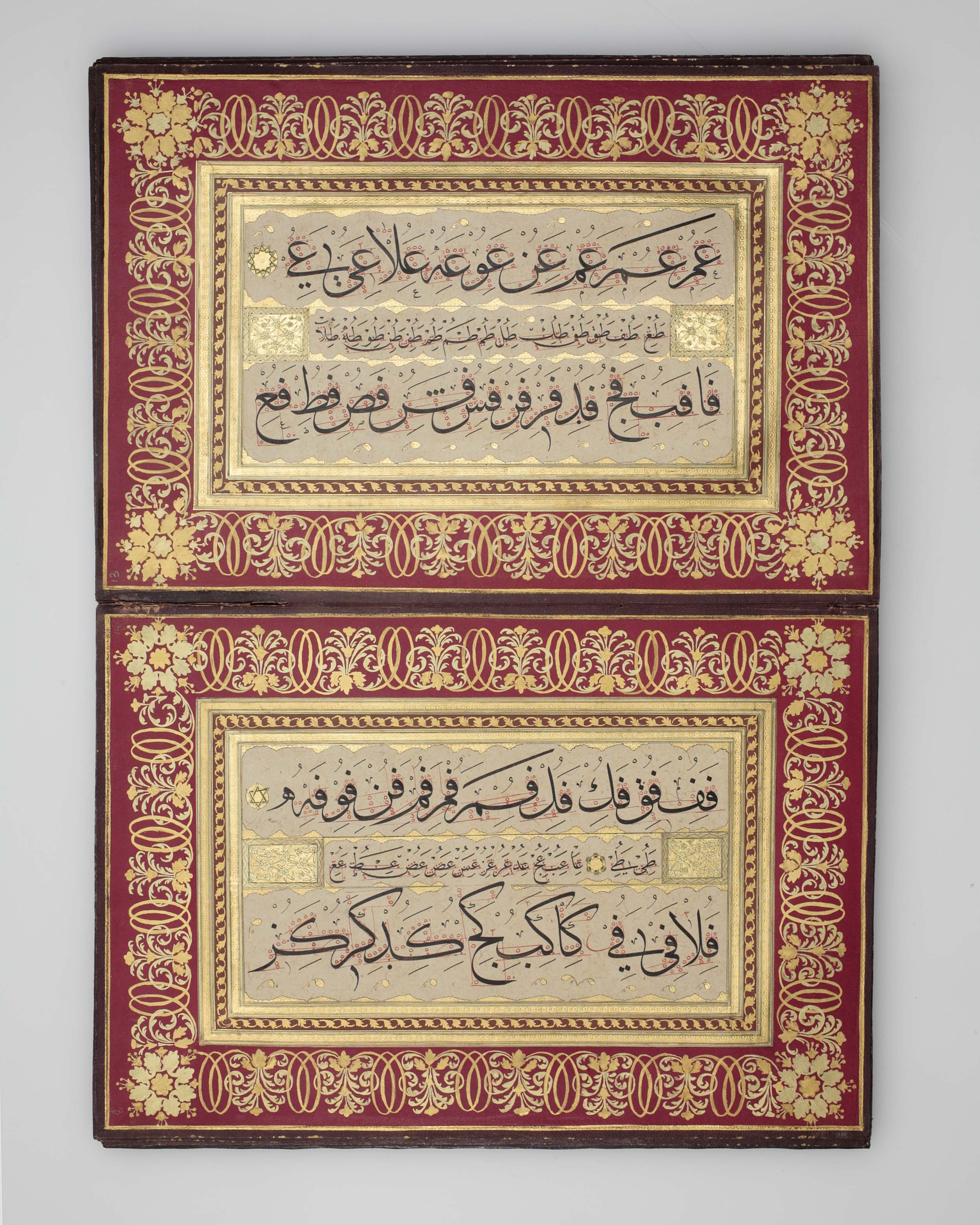
Muraqqa by Mehmed Şevkî Efendi. Khalili Collection of Islamic Art

Mehmed Shevki Efendi (Ottoman Turkish: محمد شوقي افندي; Modern Turkish: Mehmed Şevki Efendi; 1829 Kastamonu–1887 Istanbul) was a prominent Ottoman calligrapher. He is known for his Thuluth-Naskh works, and his style developed into the Shevki Mektebi school, which many contemporary calligraphers in the style take as a reference.

== Life and career ==
Born in Kastamonu, a town near the Black Sea, in 1829, Mehmed Shevki Efendi was the son of Ahmad Agha from Tajc. He was sent to Istanbul at a young age, where he was raised by his uncle.

He received his earliest formal training from his uncle, Mehmed Hulûsi Efendi (d. 1894) and obtained a Diploma at the age of fourteen. He was trained in the thuluth and the naskh scripts. Later, his uncle wanted him to study with a more experienced master and sought to apprentice him to Kazasker Mustafa Izzet Efendi. However, the boy refused to study with any master, other than his uncle. Ultimately, he taught himself advanced techniques from calligraphic works of Hâfiz Osman and other great calligraphers. By remaining with his uncle, rather than joining a different school, Mehmed Şevkî had the freedom to develop his own style. This style became known as û Şevki mektebi eb. He certified a number of calligraphers, who went on to enjoy exceptional careers including Mohammad Hosni.

Şevkî Efendi was the last in a long line of calligraphers, beginning with Sheikh Hamdullah in the 15th century, who refined and improved the sülüs and naskh scripts. He achieved a "height of perfection never attained previously, nor surpassed since."

He taught penmanship in the Ministry of War, where he trained military scribes and also worked in several schools. He also taught calligraphy to the sons of Sultan Abdulhamid II.

He died on 7 May 1887 following a stroke and was buried next to his uncle, Hulûsi Efendi, in the Merkezefendi Cemetery. He was survived by three daughters and a son.

== Work ==
He wrote 25 copies of the Quran and also produced many personal prayer books. He is the author of the work, The Thuluth & Naskh Mashqs. His work also includes calligraphic compositions, which he signed "Muhammed Shawki".

== See also ==
- Culture of the Ottoman Empire
- Islamic calligraphy
- List of Ottoman calligraphers
- Ottoman art
