= Salwa Hegazy =

Egyptian television presenter (1933-1973)

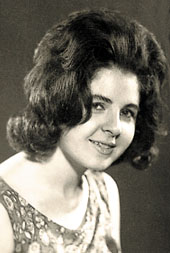
- Salwa Hegazy
- Born: Salwa Hegazy; January 1, 1931; Cairo, Egypt
- Died: February 21, 1973 (aged 42); Sinai Peninsula, Egypt (under Israeli control)
- Occupations: TV host and Poet

Salwa Hegazy (1 January 1933 – 21 February 1973) was an Egyptian television presenter and poet. She presented a number of television programs and represented Egyptian Television in a number of international conferences. She died on board Libyan Arab Airlines Flight 114 after the plane was shot down and crashed in Israeli-occupied Sinai Peninsula by Israeli fighter jets.

== Biography ==
Hegazy was born in Port Said, Egypt, and educated at the French-language Lycee School.

Hegazy had four children. She was among the 113 people killed when Israeli fighter jets shot down Libyan Arab Airlines Flight 114 on 21 February 1973. This plane was en route from Benghazi to Cairo, but a sandstorm caused it to stray from its course into Egypt's Sinai Peninsula, then under Israeli occupation. In 2003, the family filed a lawsuit against Israel, trying to bring Israeli officials to justice.

== Media career ==
Hejazi started her media career with Riyadh Radio. In 1960, she moved to Egypt to be a presenter on Egyptian state television. There, she presented programmes including A Recorded Tape, Reportage, Art and Life, and a children's show, The Sparrows, which gave her the nickname Mama Salwa. She also presented news bulletins in French.

== Literary career ==
Hejazy published four collections of poetry, including Shades and Lights in French, with an introduction by Ahmed Rami.
