= Ahmed Sheba =

Egyptian folk singer (born 1965)

- Born: Ahmed Mohamed Sheba; 21 December 1965 (age 60); Alexandria, Egypt
- Genres: Egyptian pop; Arabic pop; Shaabi
- Occupations: Singer; Songwriter
- Years active: 2005–present
- Labels: Mazzika; Rotana Records

Ahmed Sheba (Arabic: أحمد شيبة; born 21 December 1965) is an Egyptian singer and songwriter. He is known for his distinctive voice and fusion of traditional Egyptian music with modern pop elements. Sheba rose to prominence in the mid-2000s and has since become one of the most popular singers in Egypt and the wider Arab world.

== Early life and career ==
Ahmed Mohamed Sheba was born on 15 March 1965 in Alexandria, Egypt. He grew up in a musical family, with his father being an amateur oud player. Sheba started singing at a young age and participated in various school and local competitions. In 2005, Sheba auditioned for the reality TV show "Najm El Arab" (Star of the Arabs), where he finished as a semi-finalist. This exposure led to his first record deal with Mazzika, a prominent Egyptian music label.

== Musical style and influences ==
Sheba's music is characterized by a blend of traditional Egyptian melodies and contemporary pop arrangements. He is known for his powerful vocals and emotive performances. His style incorporates elements of Shaabi music, a popular working-class genre, with more polished production techniques. In interviews, Sheba has cited legendary Egyptian singers such as Umm Kulthum and Abdel Halim Hafez as his main influences, alongside more contemporary artists like Amr Diab.

== Notable works and achievements ==
Sheba's breakthrough came with his 2010 album "Leila Min Layali" (A Night of Nights), which included the hit single "Mawlood Fi Masr" (Born in Egypt). The patriotic theme of the song resonated with audiences during a period of political change in Egypt. Some of his most popular songs include: "Ah Ya Alby" (Oh My Heart) - 2013 "Kol Youm Ahebak" (Every Day I Love You) - 2016 "Shams El Aseel" (The Sun of Nobility) - 2019 Sheba has won several awards, including: Best Male Vocalist at the Middle East Music Awards (2015, 2018) Egyptian Music Award for Album of the Year (2020)

== Personal life ==
Sheba married actress Yasmin Abdel Aziz in 2021. The couple has been involved in various charitable activities, particularly focusing on education initiatives in rural Egypt.
