= Reza Abedini =

Iranian graphic designer and a professor

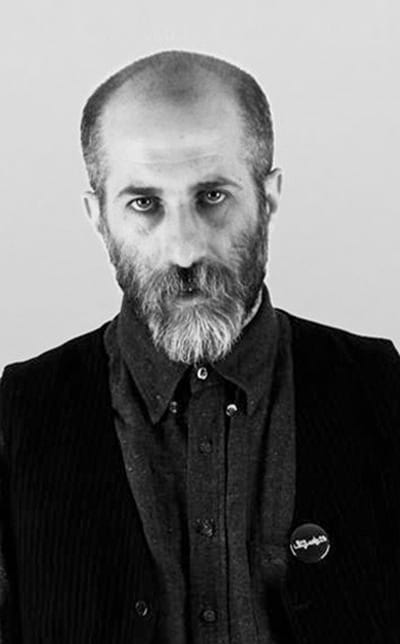
- Born: 1967 (age 57–58); Tehran, Iran
- Education: University of Art
- Known for: Persian Typographic Design, Visual Art, Graphic Design
- Notable work: Cultural Typographic Posters
- Awards: Prince Claus Fund

Reza Abedini (born 1967) is a visual artist and graphic designer from Tehran, Iran. Between 1985 and 1990, he studied for degrees in design and the visual arts at the School of Fine Arts in Tehran and the Art University of Tehran. Subsequently, he has been working as a graphic designer since 1989. Abedini founded his studio, Reza Abedini Studio, in 1993. In his work, Abedini often blurs the lines between design and art. He engages with his Iranian Heritage in creative ways, often through calligraphy and typography. Typography is a crucial aspect of Abedini’s work, and he utilizes the Persian language as both an aesthetic and conceptual element in his designs. Reza Abedini was a participating artist for the first iteration of Framer Framed’s exhibition Crisis of History, between 2 May to 28 August 2014, curated by Robert Kluijver.

== Early life ==
Reza Abedini is a graphic designer and visual artist based in the Netherlands. Originally from Iran, Abedini’s contributions to contemporary Persian graphic design blend traditional themes with modernist aesthetics. His work often incorporates Persian calligraphy into dynamic compositions, reflecting his interest in cultural identity and the exploration of form and space. Abedini's projects include cultural posters and identity designs that have received international acclaim, particularly for their inventive use of typography and calligraphic elements. His designs have been exhibited globally, including the Tehran Museum of Contemporary Art and the Stedelijk Museum.

== Design ==
His design influences, including Aleksander Rodchenko, Ikko Tanaka, Sani'ol Molk Ghafari, Roman Cieslewicz and Mirza Gholam-Reza Esfahani.

Abedini has won dozens of national and international design awards. In 2006, he received the Principal 'Prince Claus Award' in recognition of his creativity in the production of unique graphic designs and the personal manner in which he applied and redefined the knowledge and accomplishments of Iran's artistic heritage, thus making them highly interesting. The award also focuses on the diversity of historical and modern Iranian culture, recognizing the impact of graphic design as an influential international means of communication.

Abedini has been a member of the Iranian Graphic Designers Society since 1997,. He was a jury member at several biennials worldwide. His name is listed in Meggs History of Graphic Design as one of the world's outstanding post-digital graphic designers.

== Academic career ==
Since 1996, he has been a professor at the University of Tehran in graphic design and visual culture. He previously was a visiting assistant professor of graphic design and visual culture at the American University of Beirut.

== Honors and awards ==
- 1993, 1994, 1996 – First Prize: best film poster of Fajr International Film Festival, Iran
- 1994 – Film Critics Special Award for the Best film poster, Iran
- 1996 – IRIB’S Special Award: The Best film poster, Iran
- 1999 – 3rd Award: poster, The 6th Biennial of Iranian Graphic Designers, Iran
- 1999 – Special Award: Creativity from Iranian Graphic Designers Society, Iran
- 2003 – Special Prize: China International Poster Biennale, China
- 2004 – The Union of Visual Artists of the Czech Republic Award, Brno, Czech Republic
- 2004 – Second prize: 15th Festival d'affiches de Chaumont, France
- 2004 – Gold Prize: Hong Kong International Poster Triennial, Hong Kong
- 2004 – First prize and gold medal: 8th International Biennial of the Poster, Mexico
- 2004 – Silver prize: Second International Poster Biennale, Korea
- 2004 – First prize: The First international Biennale of the Islamic world Poster, Iran
- 2005 – Bronze Medal: The 2nd China International Poster Biennial CIPB, China
- 2005 – First prize: 9th Press Festival of Children & Young Adults, Iran
- 2006 – Principal award, Prince Claus Award, Netherlands

== Bibliography ==
- Reza Abedini (Vision of Design), by Jianping He (ISBN 978-981-245-502-4)
- Reza Abedini (design & designer), by Alain le Quernec (ISBN 978-2-910565-86-2)
- New Visual Culture of Modern Iran, by Reza Abedini and Hans Wolbers (ISBN 978-90-6369-097-7)
- Iran. Gnomi e giganti, paradossi e malintesi, by Reza Abedini and Ebrahim Nabavi (ISBN 978-88-7770-846-5)

== See also ==
Other Iranian Prince Claus Award winners

- Rakhshan Bani-Etemad
- Ebrahim Nabavi
