= Abdol Majid Taleqani =

Persian calligrapher

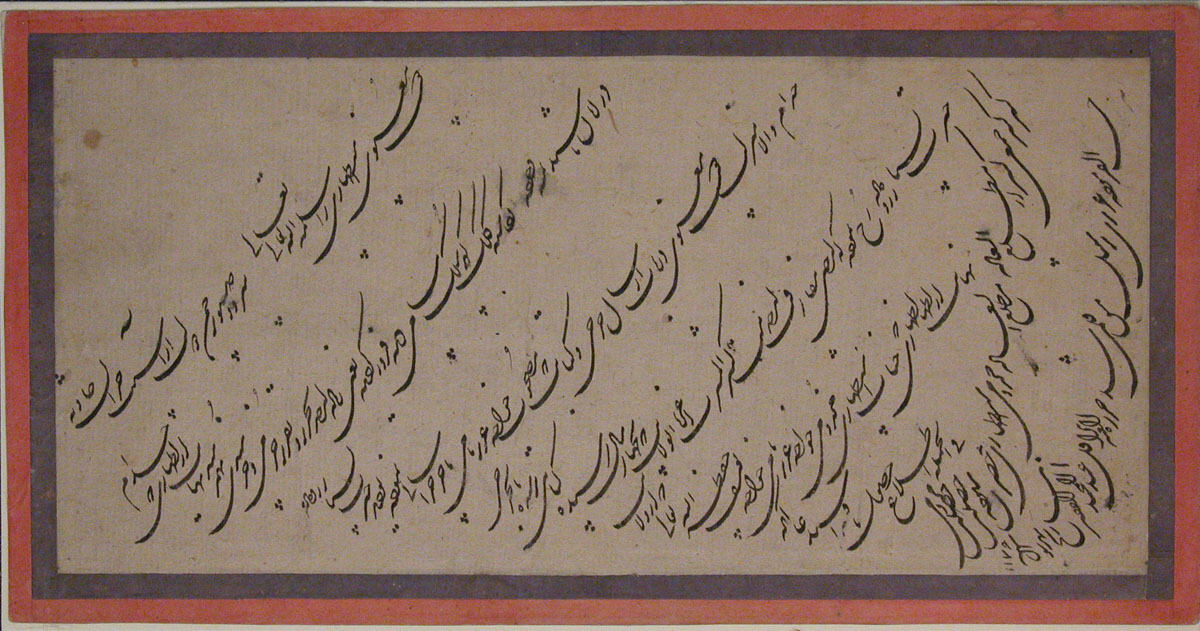
Page of Shekasteh calligraphy by Abdol Majid Taleqani, dated 1763. Stored in the Metropolitan Museum of Art

Abdol Majid Taleqani (Note: Also spelled "Abdolmajid", "Abd-al-Majid", "Taleghani" or "Talaqani".) (Persian: عبدالمجید طالقانی; c. 1737/8–1771/2) was an eminent Iranian calligrapher of the 18th century. He was the most celebrated 18th-century calligrapher of the Shekasteh form of Nastaliq, and is also credited with turning the Shekasteh script into its definitive form.

== Biography ==
Taleqani was born c. 1737/8 in the Taleqan district of Qazvin (now Alborz Province) in Afsharid Iran. He pursued education at a young age in the city of Isfahan, the former royal capital of Safavid Iran. Due to Taleqani's ascetic character, he is also known as Darvish Abdol Majid ("Abdol Majid the Dervish"). He died in Isfahan in 1771/2.

== Calligraphy ==
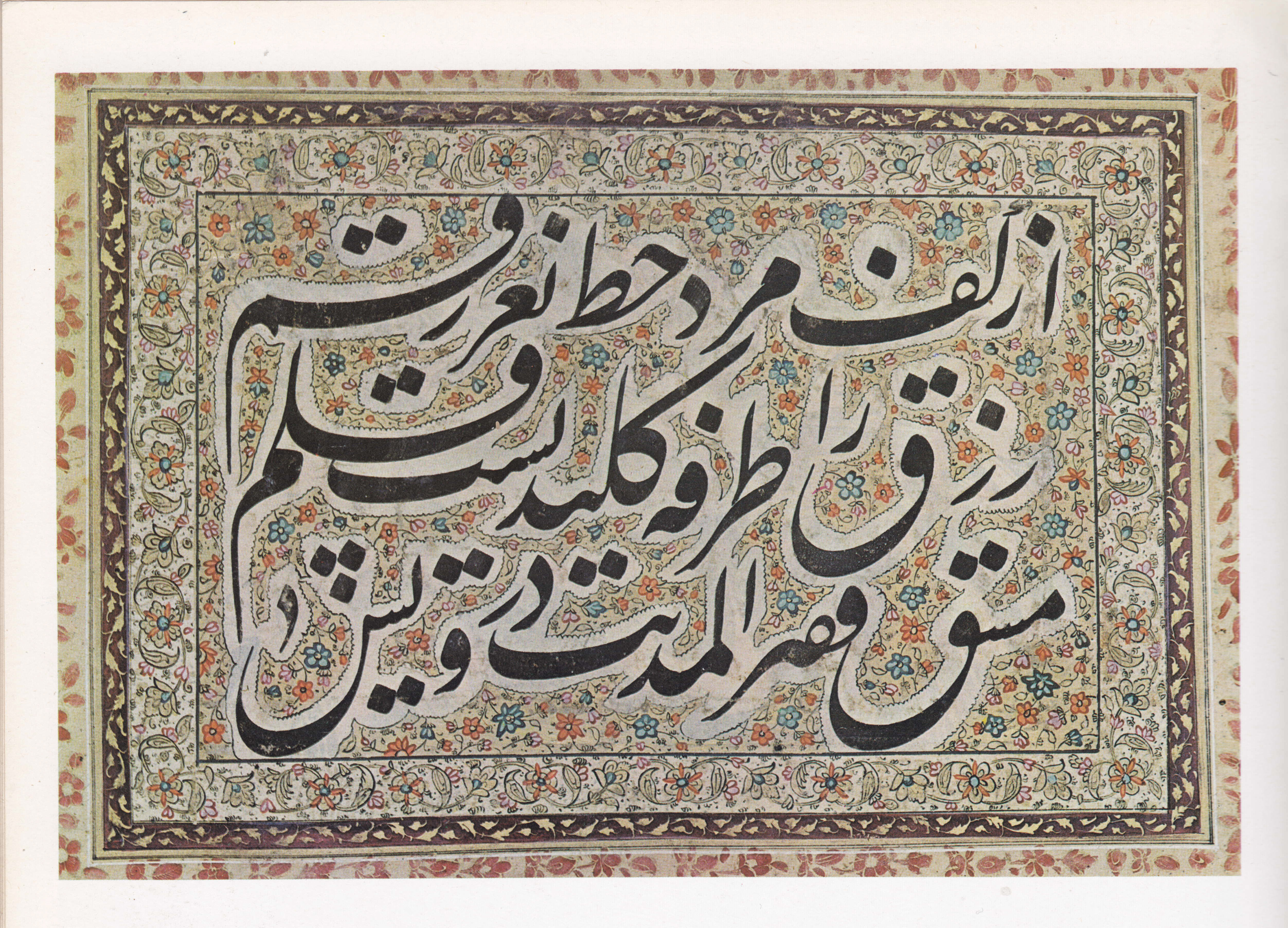
An illuminated panel in Nastaliq script, by Abdol Majid Taleqani

The Shekasteh script, which fuses features from taliq and Nastaliq, emerged at the Safavid court circles in the 17th century. At the time, the script was used for correspondence. Taleqani's calligraphy teacher is unknown, but Taleqani's works were reportedly of even higher quality than that of Mohammad Shafi al-Hosayni (died 1670/1). The art historian P. P. Soucek explains that Taleqani may have therefore studied under a calligrapher who worked in the style of Mohammad Shafi al-Hosayni. Abdol Majid's calligraphic works are mostly known through album pages created between 1756/7 to 1771/2. These album pages are written in both Shekasteh and Nastaliq calligraphic scripts.

In 19th-century Qajar Iran, the Shekasteh script was also used for album pages and copying manuscripts in addition to correspondence. Abdol Majid's calligraphic career, in turn, "may mark the beginning of a wider acceptance of this script". Abdol Majid's personal formulation of Shekasteh was reportedly admired and imitated by later Iranian calligraphers, including Mirza Kuchik Esfahani (died 1813) and Neshat (died 1829).

== Poetry ==
Taleqani also wrote poetry with both "Majid" and "Khamus" as his pen name (takhallos).
