= Amar Nastaleeq =

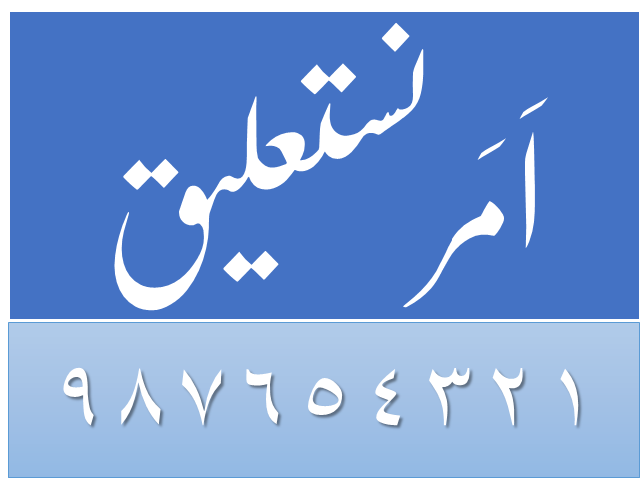
- Category: Nastaʿlīq
- Designer(s): Amar Fayaz Buriro, Saima Asghar
- Date created: 2012
- Date released: 2013
- License: Proprietary

Amar Nastaleeq (Urdu: امر نستعلیق) is a Nastaliq style Embedded OpenType and TrueType Font which was lowest in size, created for web embedding on Urdu websites in 2013. The font was announced by Urdu poet Fahmida Riaz. Jang Group of Newspapers has rendered this font from the developers.

== Development ==
Amar Nastaleeq was developed on the tables of Nafees Nastaleeq created by Center for Language Engineering, Lahore and re-shaped all glyphs and Arabic diacritics in order and excluded majority of Orthographic ligatures by developers. Amar Fayaz Buriro, a language engineer and Saima Asghar have developed this font and released it in 2013. Jang Group of Newspapers then rendered this font and exclusively used it in their websites for 18 months and then this font become freely for open usage.

== Technical info ==
The font is developed for Desktop publishing and Embedded OpenType. It is encoded on UTF-8, in Encoding Scheme: 4. The font has total 1006 number of characters of Urdu and Roman typography including numerical digits of both languages. There are 7 most commonly used Orthographic ligatures of Urdu language are included in the font.

== Font size ==
Amar Nastaleeq font has different sizes according to the type. For Desktop publishing in TrueType format it is 361 KB sized and for Embedded OpenType (eot) format the font size has been reduced on 154 KB, in Web Open Font Format (WOFF) the size is 185 KB.
