= Nastaliq =

Predominant calligraphic hand of the Perso-Arabic script

Nastaʿlīq نَسْتَعْلِیق
- "Welcome to Wikipedia" from the Persian Wikipedia
- Script type: Abjad
- Period: 14th century AD – present
- Direction: Right-to-left
- Region: Commonly used in Iran, Pakistan, Afghanistan, India and Xinjiang; Historically used in Iraq, Turkey, Uzbekistan, Bangladesh, Turkmenistan and Tajikistan
- Languages: Classical Persian; Urdu; Kashmiri; Punjabi; Arwi; Turkic languages

ISO 15924
- ISO 15924: Aran (161), Arabic (Nastaliq variant)

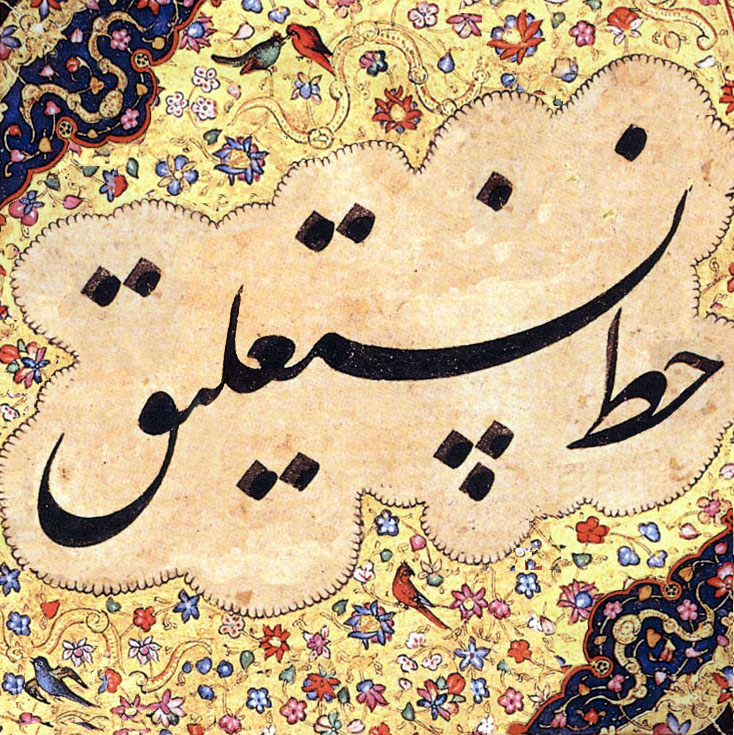
Example reading "خط نڛتعليق" ("Nastaliq script") in Nastaliq. The dotted form ڛ is used in place of س.

Nastaliq (Note: (/ˌnæstəˈliːk, ˈnæstəliːk/; Persian: ['nastaʔ'liːq]; Urdu: [nəst̪əʔ'liːq, nəst̪ɑː'liːq]); also romanized as Nastaʿlīq or Nastaleeq or Nastaaleeq (نَسْتَعْلِیق)) is one of the main calligraphic hands used to write the Persian and sometimes Arabic scripts, and is used for several significant Indo-Iranian languages, predominantly Persian, Urdu, Pashto, Balochi, Punjabi (in Pakistan), Kashmiri and Saraiki. It is also often used for Ottoman Turkish, but rarely for Arabic (particularly in Iraq) and Arwi. Nastaliq developed in Iran from a combination of Naskh and Ta'liq, beginning in the 13th century and it remains widely used in Iran, India, Pakistan, Afghanistan, and other countries for writing poetry and as a form of art.

== History ==
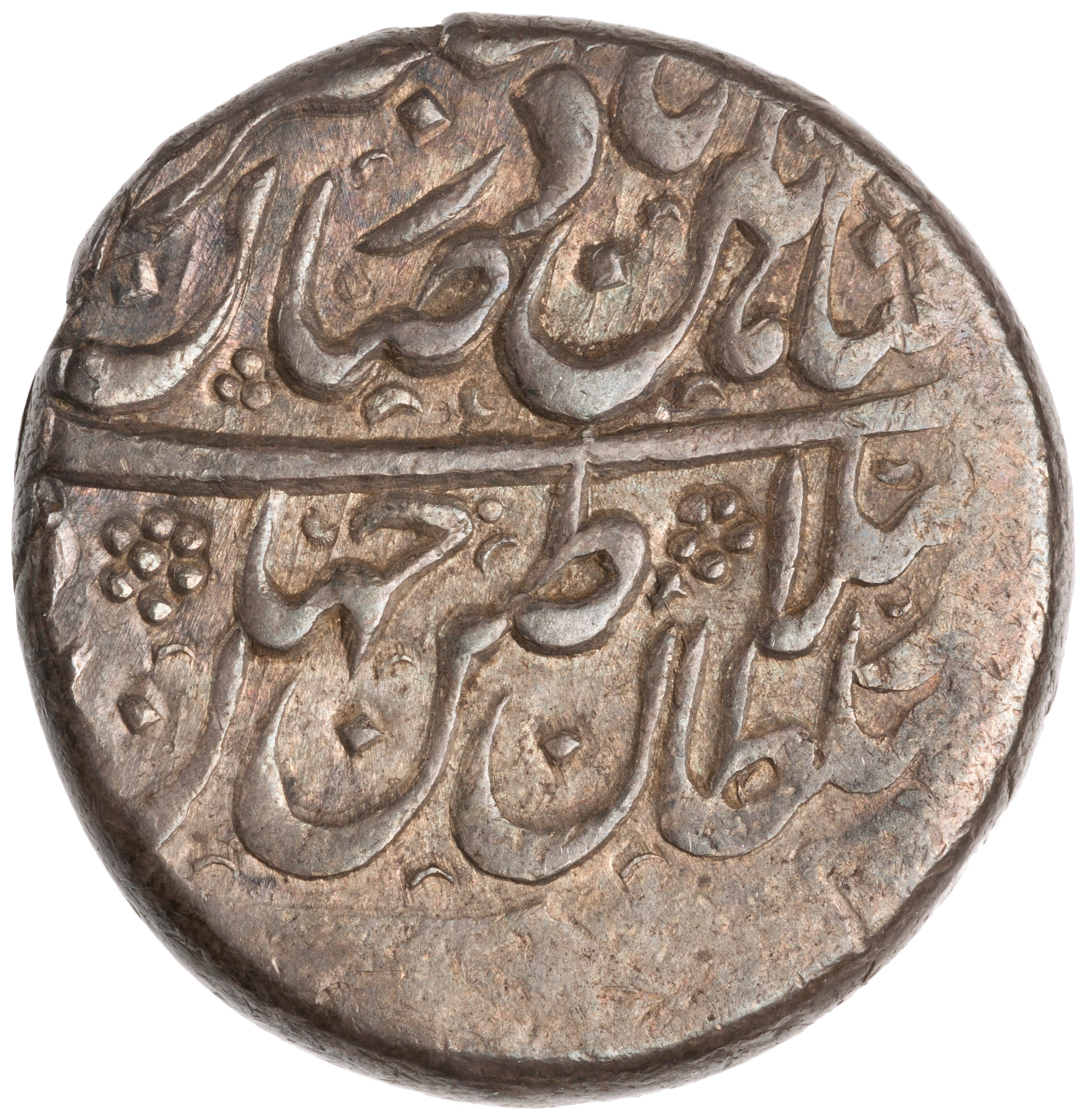
Nastaliq writing style in Silver coin of Nader Shah, minted in Daghestan. Dated 1741/2. Reverse.

The name Nastaliq "is a contraction of the Persian naskh-e ta'liq (Persian: نَسْخِ تَعلیق), meaning a hanging or suspended naskh." Virtually all Safavid authors (like Dust Muhammad or Qadi Ahmad) attributed the invention of nastaliq to Mir Ali Tabrizi, who lived at the end of the 14th and the beginning of the 15th century. That tradition was questioned by Elaine Wright, who traced the evolution of Nastaliq in 14th-century Iran and showed how it developed gradually among scribes in Shiraz. According to her studies, nastaliq has its origin from naskh alone, and not by combining naskh and taliq, as was commonly thought. In addition to study of the practice of calligraphy, Elaine Wright also found a document written by Jafar Tabrizi c. 1430, according to whom:

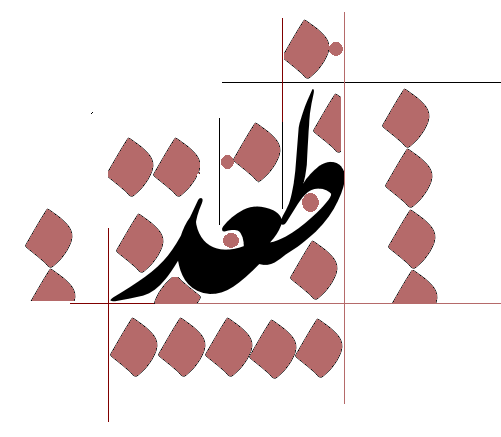
In Nasta'liq calligraphy, dimensions and sizes are determined using the dot of Nasta'liq and small approximate circles. In the hypothetical word TAAD (Persian: طعد), observe the dotting and dimensioning

It must be known that nastaʿliq is derived from naskh. Some Shirazi [scribes] modified it [naskh] by taking out the flattened [letter] kaf and straight bottom part of [the letters] sin, lam and nun. From other scripts they then brought in a curved sin and stretched forms and introduced variations in the thickness of the line. So a new script was created, to be named nastaʿliq. After a while Tabrizi [scribes] modified what Shirazi [scribes] had created by gradually rendering it thinner and defining its canons, until the time when Khwaja Mir ʿAli Tabrizi brought this script to perfection.

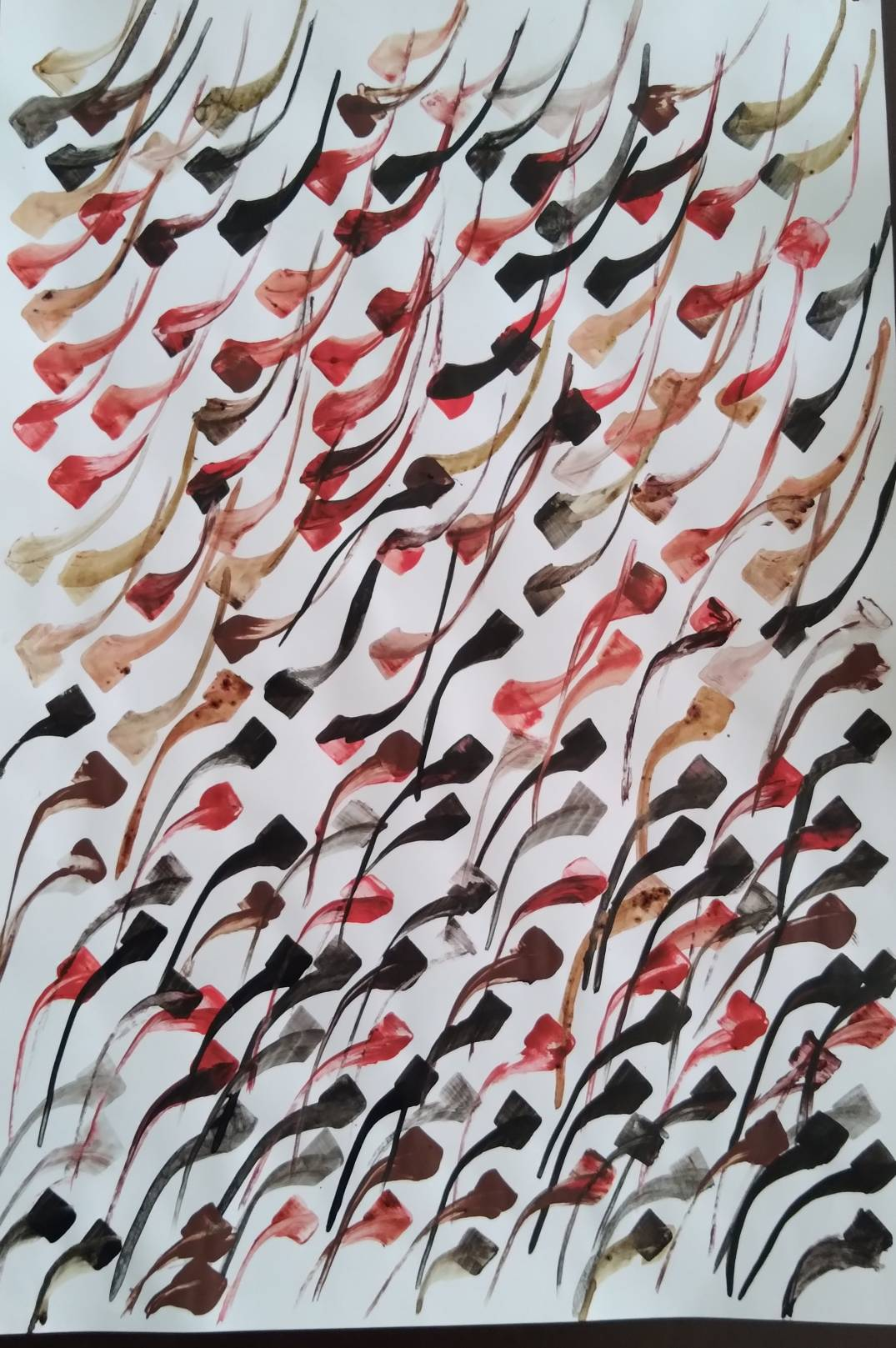
Nastaliq Persian Calligram the Persian letter Mem

Thus, "our earliest written source also credits Shirazi scribes with the development of nastaʿliq and Mir ʿAli Tabrizi with its canonization." Wright's proposed origin of nastaliq was complicated by studies of Francis Richard, who argued on the basis of some manuscripts from Tabriz that its early evolution was not confined to Shiraz. Finally, many authors point out that development of nastaʿliq was a process which occurred over several centuries. For example, Gholam-Hosayn Yusofi, Ali Alparslan and Sheila Blair recognize a gradual shift towards nastaʿliq in some 13th-century manuscripts. Hamid Reza Afsari traces the first elements of the style to 5th/11th-century copies of Persian translations of the Qur'an, and Rawāqī argues that the referenced translations may be even older.

Persian differs from Arabic in its proportion of straight and curved letters. It also lacks the definite article al-, whose upright alif and lam are responsible for Arabic writing's distinct verticality and rhythm. Hanging scripts like taliq and nastaliq were suitable for writing Persian –when taliq was used for court documents, nastaliq was developed for Persian poetry, "whose hemistiches encourage the pile-up of letters against the intercolumnar ruling. Only later was it adopted for prose."

The first master of nastaliq was the aforementioned Mir Ali Tabrizi, who passed his style to his son ʿUbaydallah. A student of ʿUbaydallah, Jafar Tabrizi (d. 1431) (see quote above), moved to Herat, when he became the head of the scriptorium (kitabkhana) of prince Baysunghur (therefore his epithet Baysunghuri). Jafar trained several students in nastaliq, of whom the most famous was Azhar Tabrizi (d. 1475). Its classical form nastaliq achieved under Sultan Ali Mashhadi (d. 1520), a student of Azhar (or perhaps one of Azhar's students) who worked for Sultan Husayn Bayqara (1469–1506) and his vizier Ali-Shir Nava'i.

Simultaneously, a different style of nastaliq developed in western and southern Iran. This style was associated with ʿAbd al-Rahman Khwarazmi, the calligrapher of the Pir Budaq Qara Qoyunlu (1456–1466), and then with his children, ʿAbd al-Karim Khwarazmi and ʿAbd al-Rahim Anisi (both active at the court of Ya'qub Beg Aq Qoyunlu; 1478–1490). This more angular western Iranian style was largely dominant at the beginning of the Safavid era, but then lost to the style canonized by Sultan Ali Mashhadi; however, it continued to be used in the Indian subcontinent.

The most famous calligrapher of the next generation in eastern lands was Mir Ali Heravi (d. 1544), who was especially renowned for his calligraphic specimens (qitʿa). The eastern style of nastaliq became the predominant style in western Iran, as artists gravitated to work in the Safavid royal scriptorium. The most famous of these calligraphers working for the court in Tabriz was Shah Mahmud Nishapuri (d. 1564/1565), known especially for the unusual choice of nastaliq as a script used for the copy of the Qur'an. Nastaliq achieved its apogee in the writings of Mir Emad Hassani (d. 1615), "whose style was the model in the following centuries." Mir Emad's successors in the 17th and 18th centuries developed a more elongated style of nastaliq, with wider spaces between words. Mirza Mohammad Reza Kalhor (d. 1892), the most important calligrapher of the 19th century, reintroduced the more compact style, writing words on a smaller scale in a single motion. In the 19th century nastaliq was also adopted in Iran for lithographed books. In the 20th century, "the use of nastaliq declined. After World War II, however, interest in calligraphy and above all in nastaliq revived, and some outstandingly able masters of the art have since then emerged."

The use of nastaliq expanded beyond Iran at a very early date. Timurids brought it to the Indian subcontinent, and nastaliq became the favorite script of the Persian court of the Mughals. Notable masters of nastaliq such as Muhammad Husayn Kashmiri (d. 1611/1612) and Abd al-Rahim Anbarin-Qalam worked for Akbar (1556–1605) and Jahangir (1605–1627). Another important practitioner of the script was Abd al-Rashid Daylami (d. 1671), nephew and student of Mir Emad, who became court calligrapher of Shah Jahan (1628–1658) after arriving in India. During this era, nastaliq became the common script for writing the Hindustani language, especially Standard Urdu.

Nastaliq was also adopted in the Ottoman Empire, which has always had strong cultural ties to Iran. Here it was known as taliq (Turkish: talik), not to be confused with the Persian taliq script. The first Iranian calligraphers who brought nastaliq to Ottoman lands, including Asadullah Kirmani (d. 1488), belonged to the western tradition. However, at a relatively early stage, Ottoman calligraphers adopted the eastern style of nastaliq. In the 17th century, a student of Mir Emad, Darvish Abdi Bokharai (d. 1647), transplanted his style to Istanbul. The greatest master of nastaliq in 18th century was Mehmed Yasari (d. 1798), who closely followed Mir Emad. This tradition was further developed by Yasari's son Mustafa Izzet (d. 1849), who founded a distinct Ottoman school of nastaliq. He introduced new and precise proportions of the script that differed from the Iranian tradition. The most important member of this school in the second half of the 19th century was Sami Efendi (d. 1912), who taught many famous practitioners of nastaliq, including Mehmed Nazif Bey (d. 1913), Mehmed Hulusi Yazgan (d. 1940) and Necmeddin Okyay (d. 1976). The specialty of the Ottoman school was celî nastaliq, used in inscriptions and mosque plates.

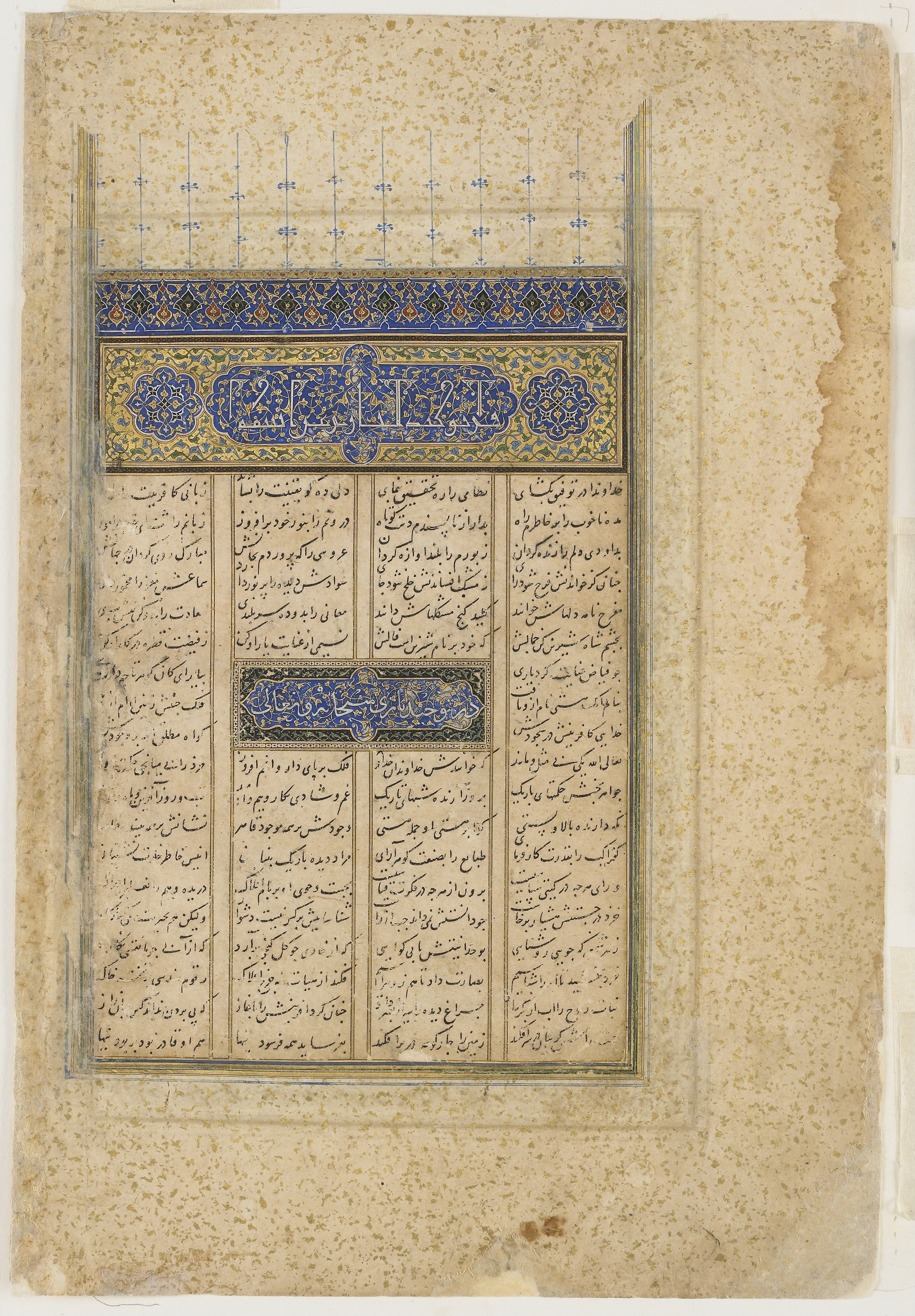
Opening page to a copy of Nizami's Khosrow and Shirin with calligraphy by Mir Ali Tabrizi. Tabriz, c. 1410. Freer Gallery of Art

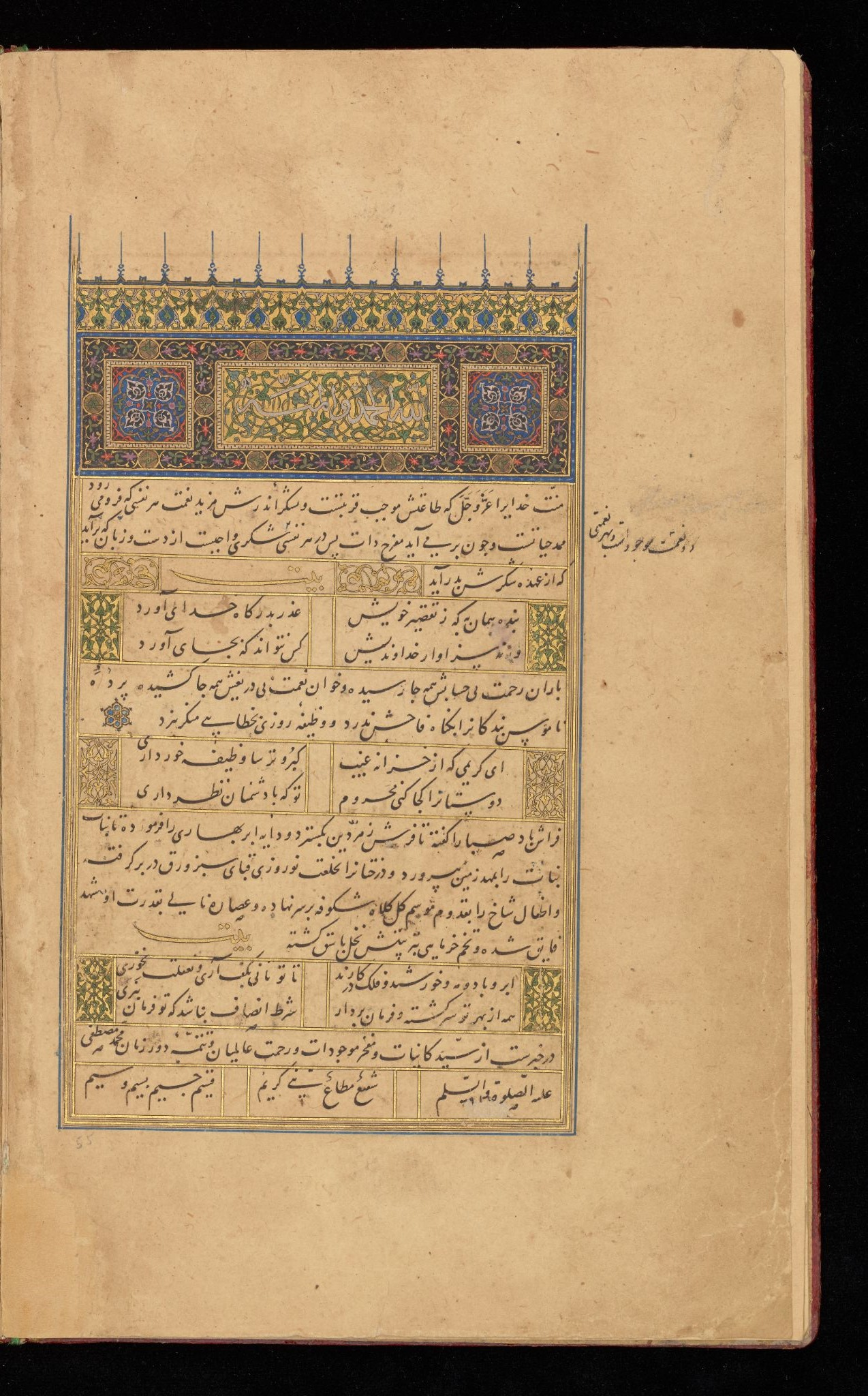
Opening page from a manuscript of Saʿdi's Gulistan copied by Jafar Tabrizi. Herat, 1426/27. Chester Beatty Library

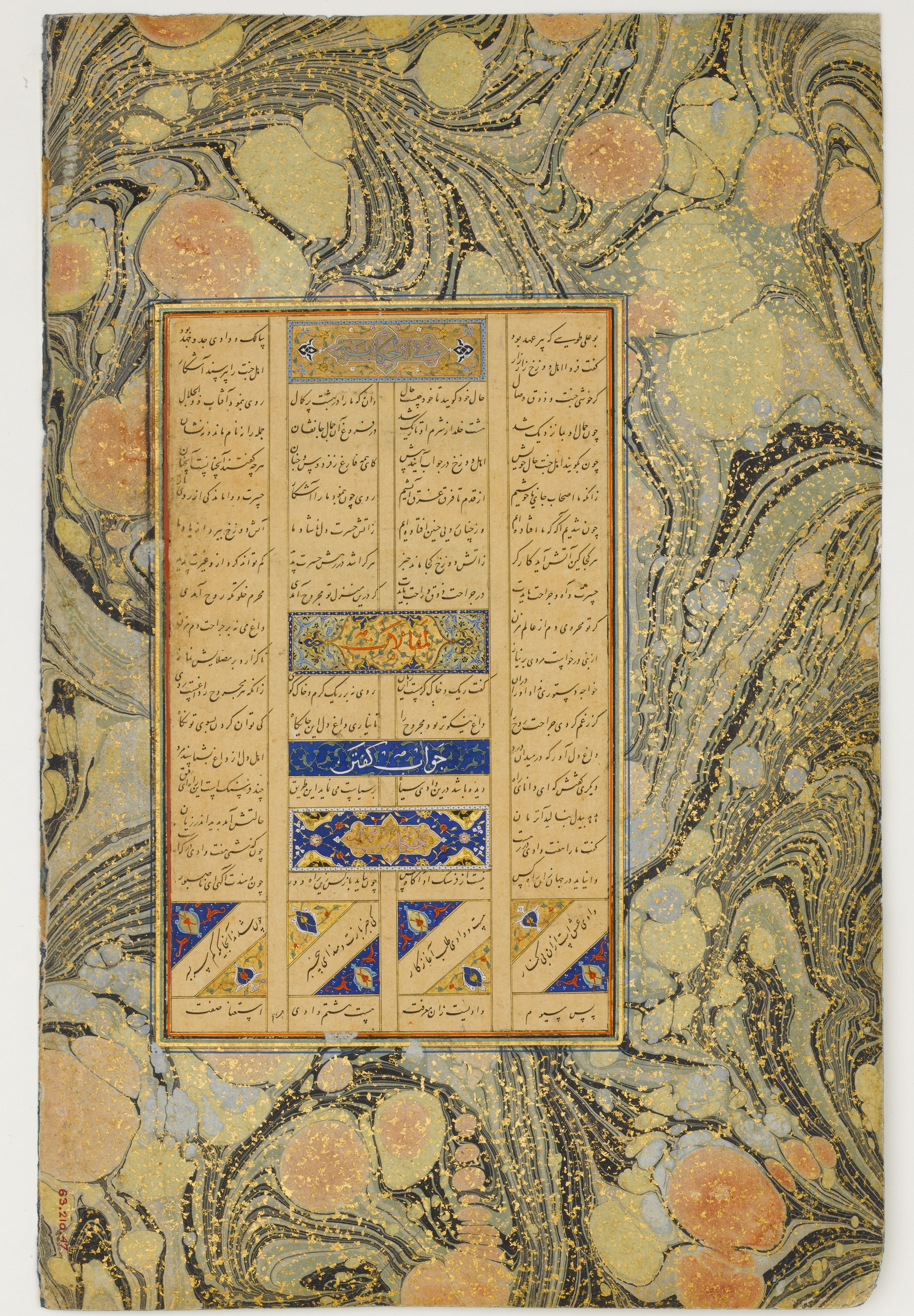
Page from a manuscript of Attar's Mantiq al-Tayr copied by Sultan Ali Mashhadi. Herat, dated 25 April 1487. Metropolitan Museum of Art

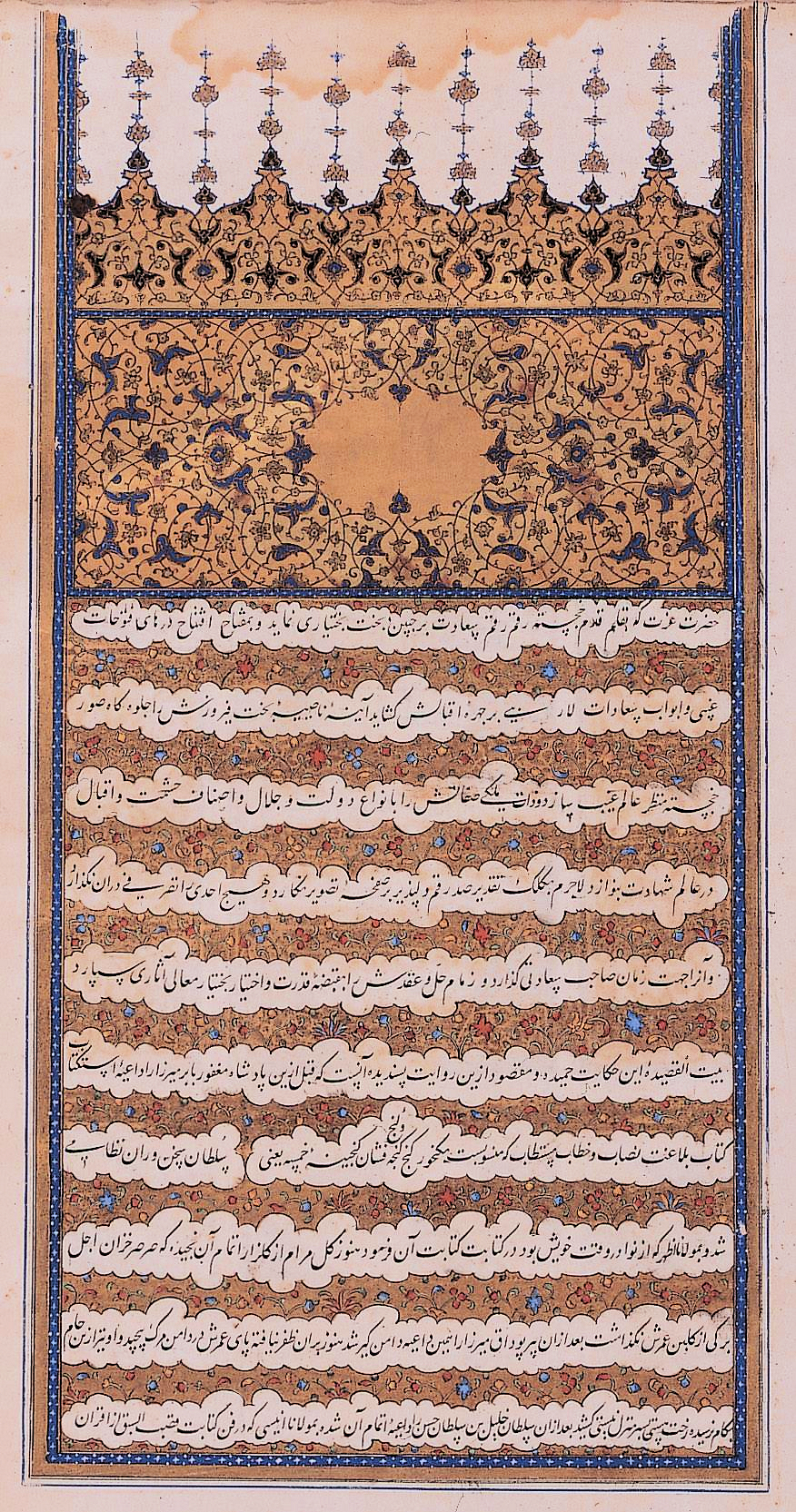
Colophon to Nizami's Khamsa copied by ʿAbd al-Rahim Khwarazmi Anisi. Tabriz, 1481. Topkapı Palace Museum

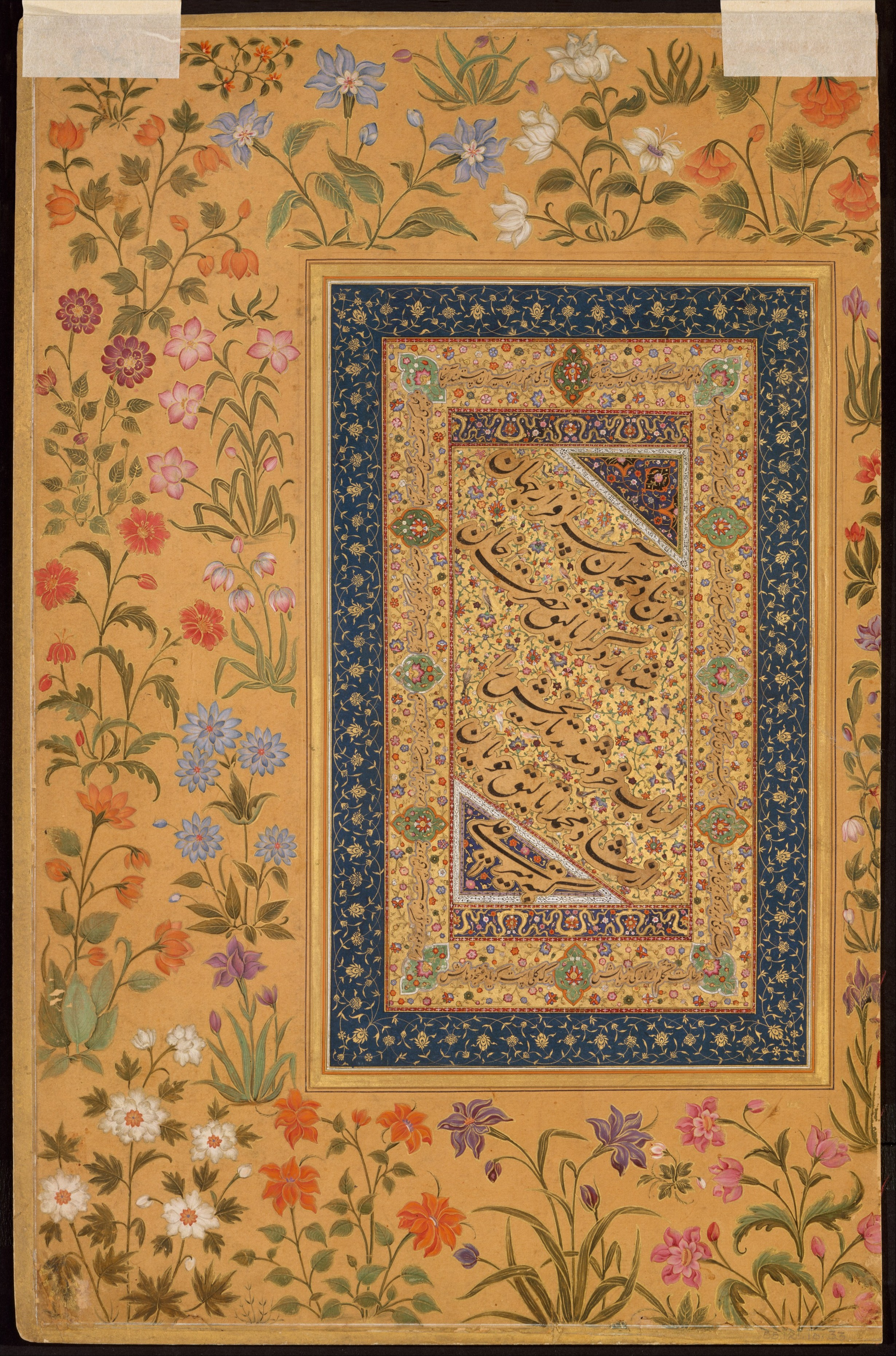
Rubaʿi copied by Mir Ali Heravi and later mounted in the so-called "Kevorkian Album". Bukhara, c. 1534. Metropolitan Museum of Art

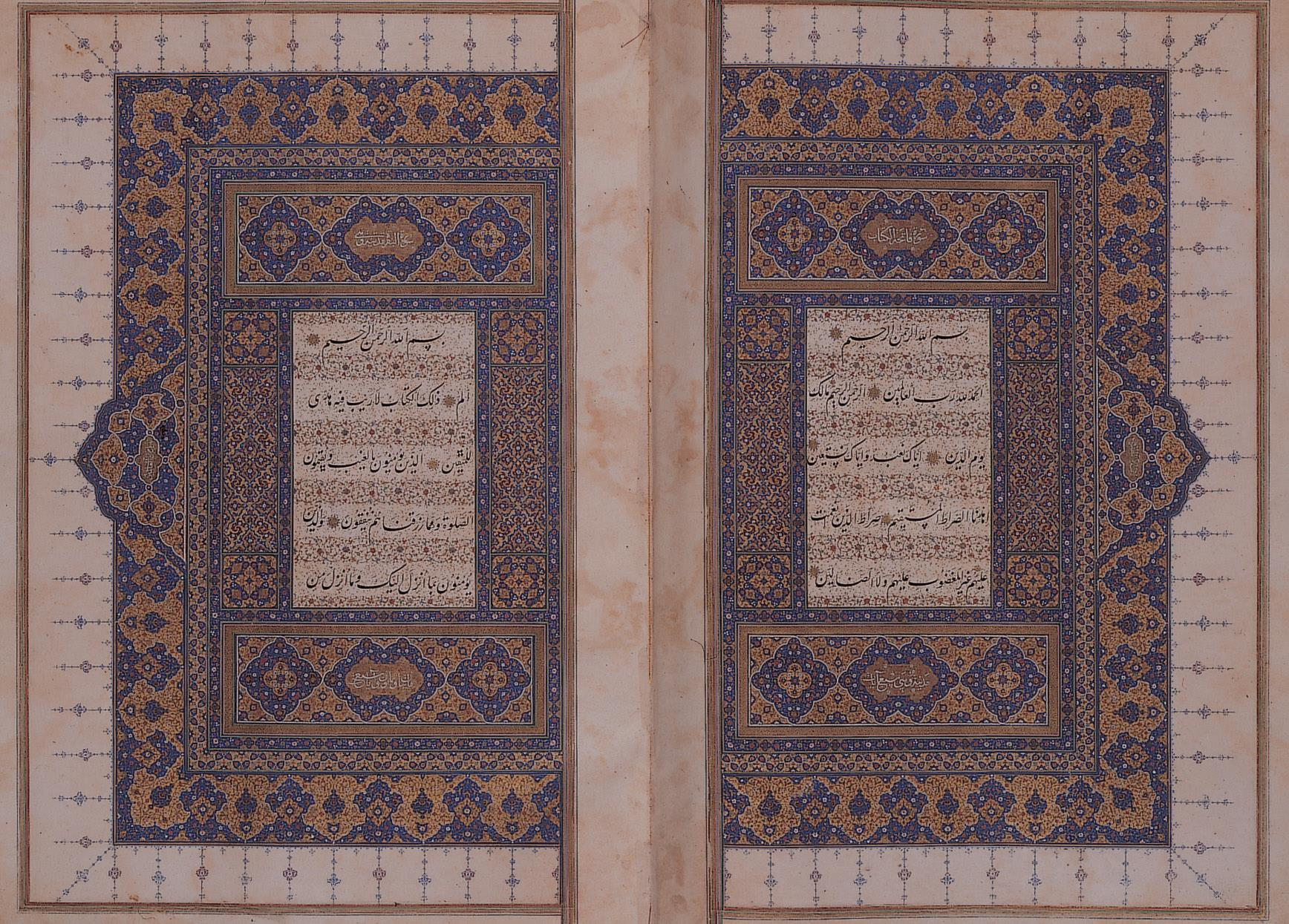
Opening double page from the Qur'an manuscript copied by Shah Mahmud Nishapuri, dated 12 June 1538. Topkapı Palace Museum

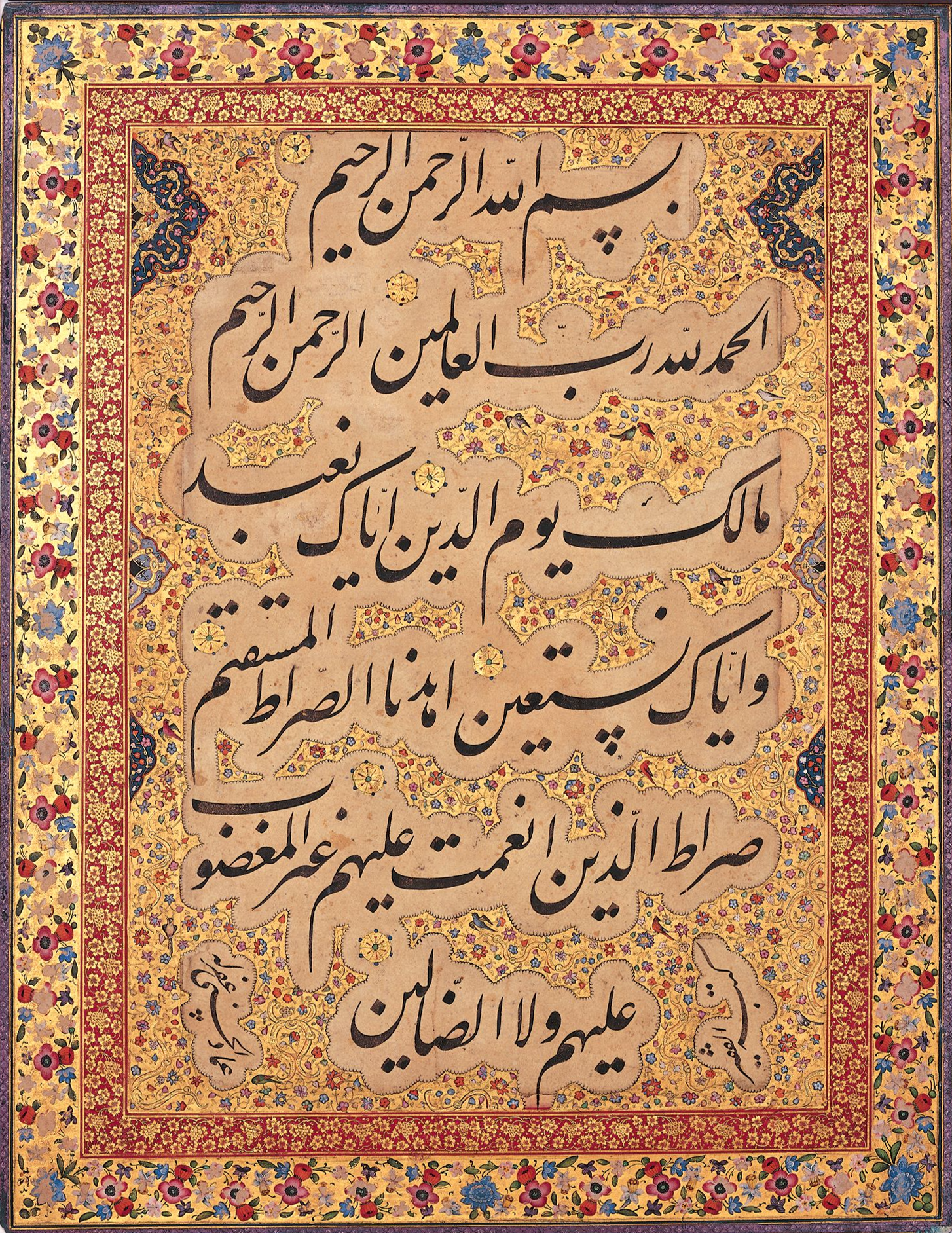
Sura Al-Fatiha copied by Mir Emad Hassani. Museum of the Islamic Era

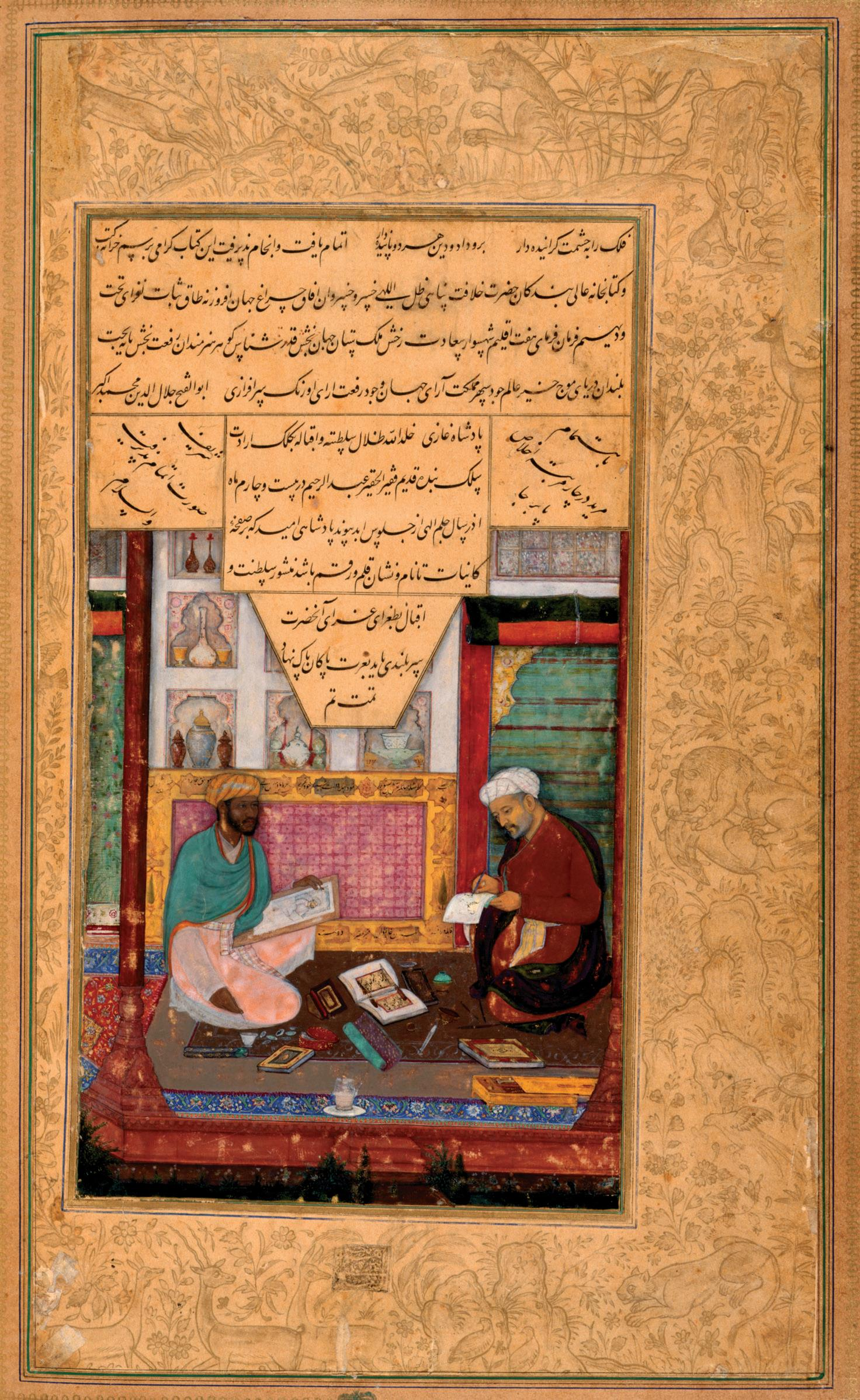
Colophon from a manuscript of Nizami's Khamsa copied by Abd al-Rahim Anbarin-Qalam, dated 14 December 1595. British Library

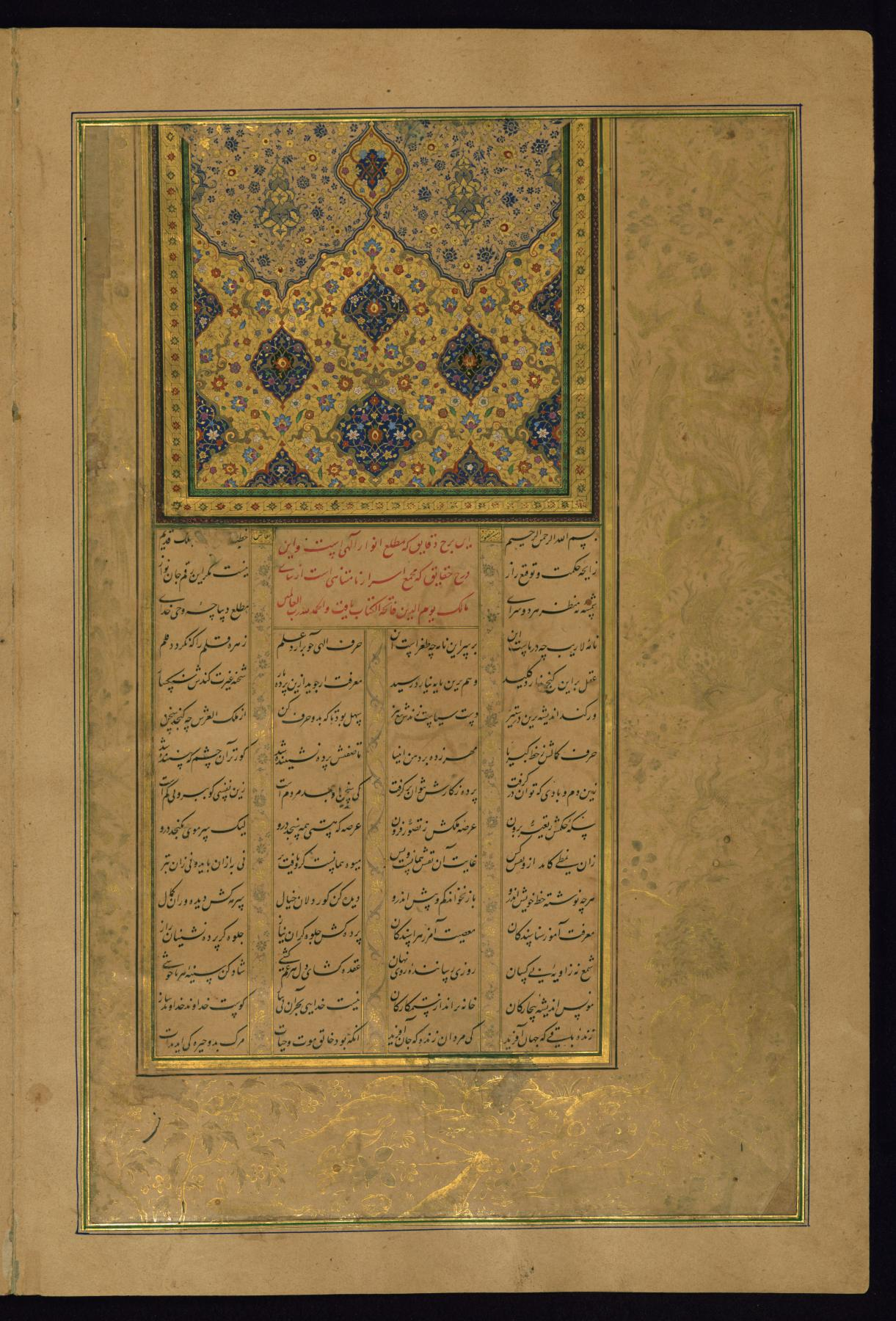
Page from a manuscript of Amir Khusrau's Khamsa copied by Muhammad Husayn Kashmiri and finished in the forty-second year of Akbar's reign (March 1597 – March 1598). Walters Art Museum

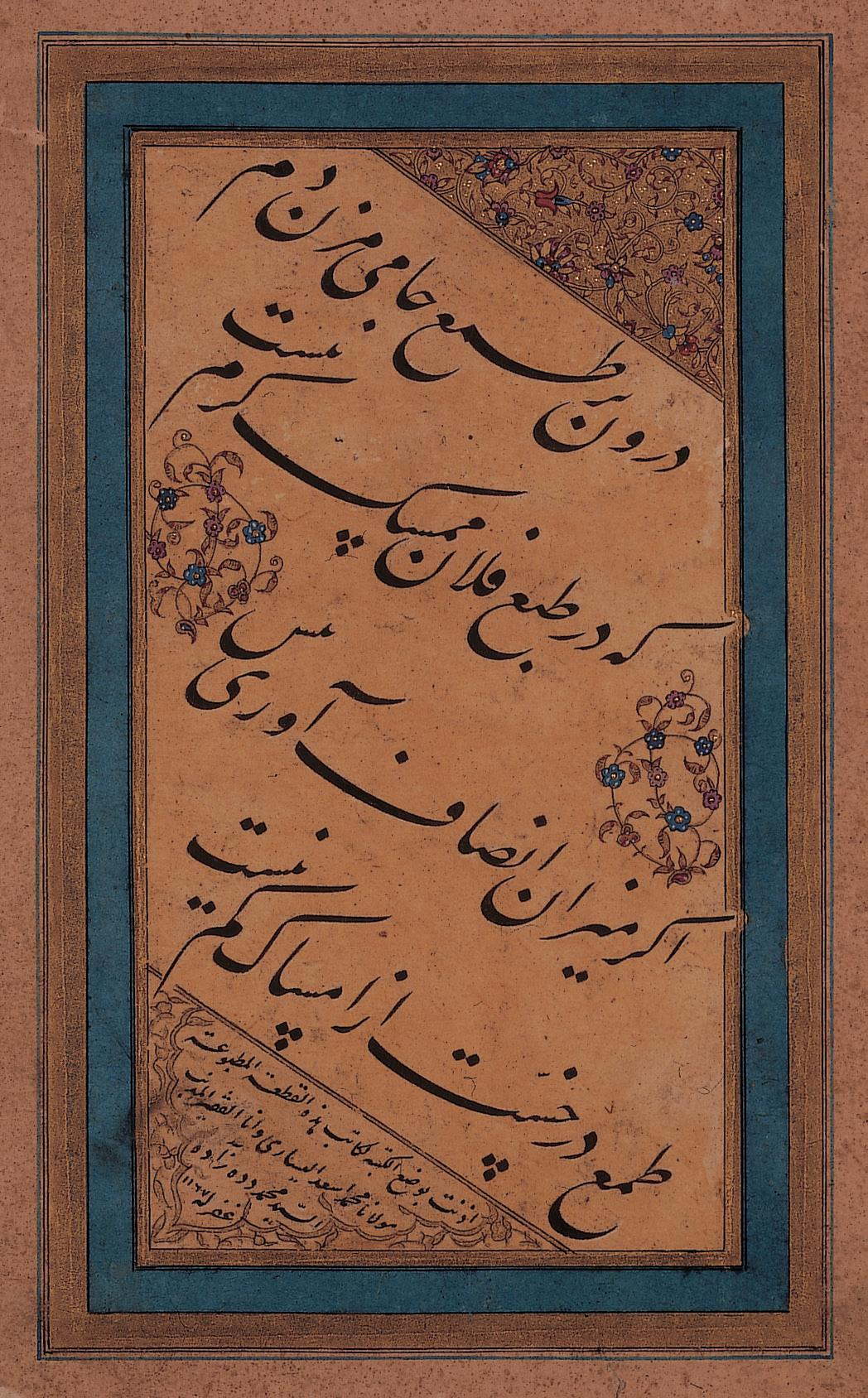
Calligrapher's license with a rubaʿi copied by Mehmed Yasari from an exemplar by Mir Emad. Istanbul, 1754. Topkapı Palace Museum

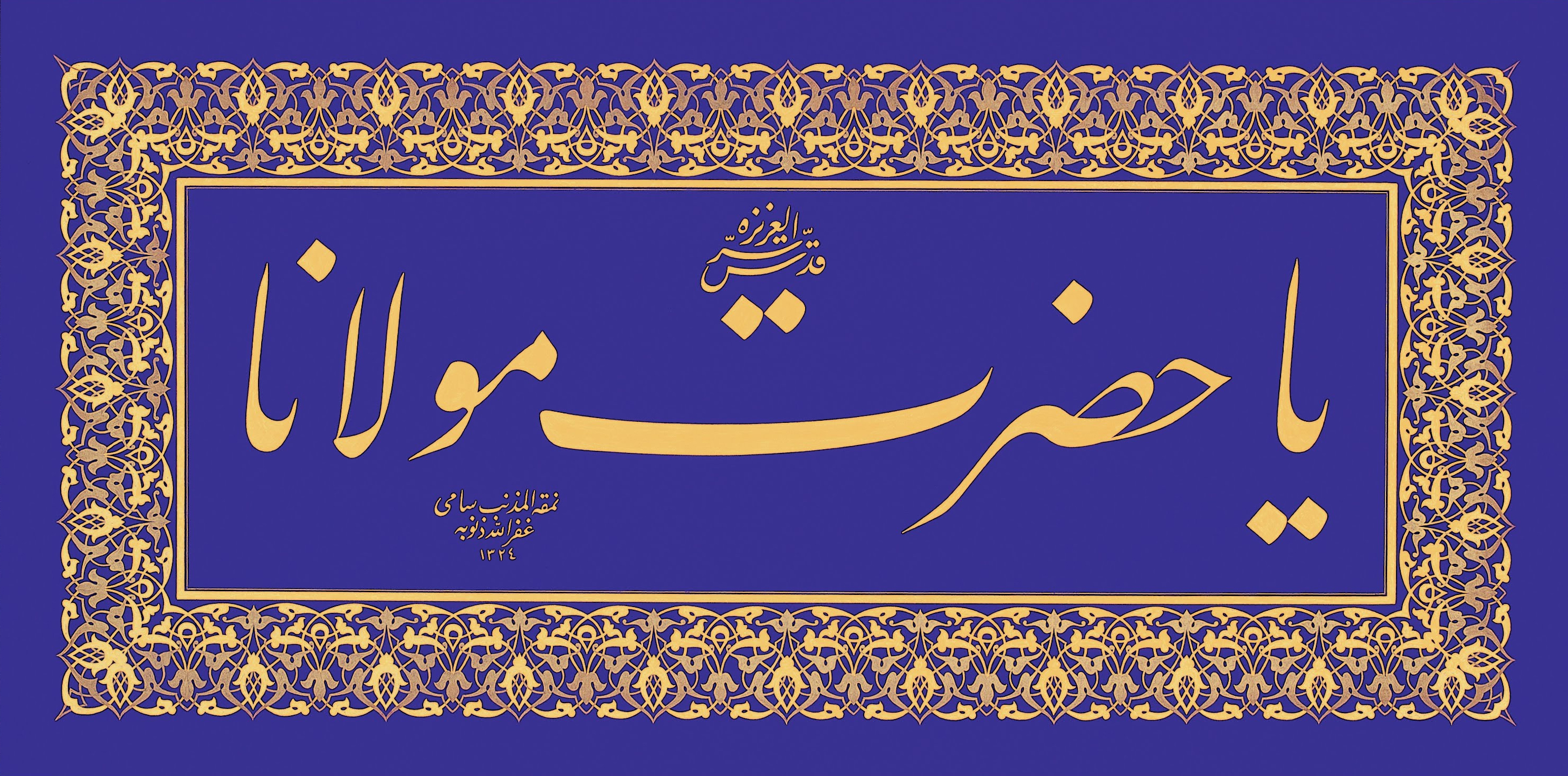
Levha (calligraphic inscription) by Sami Efendi. Istanbul, 1906. Sakıp Sabancı Museum

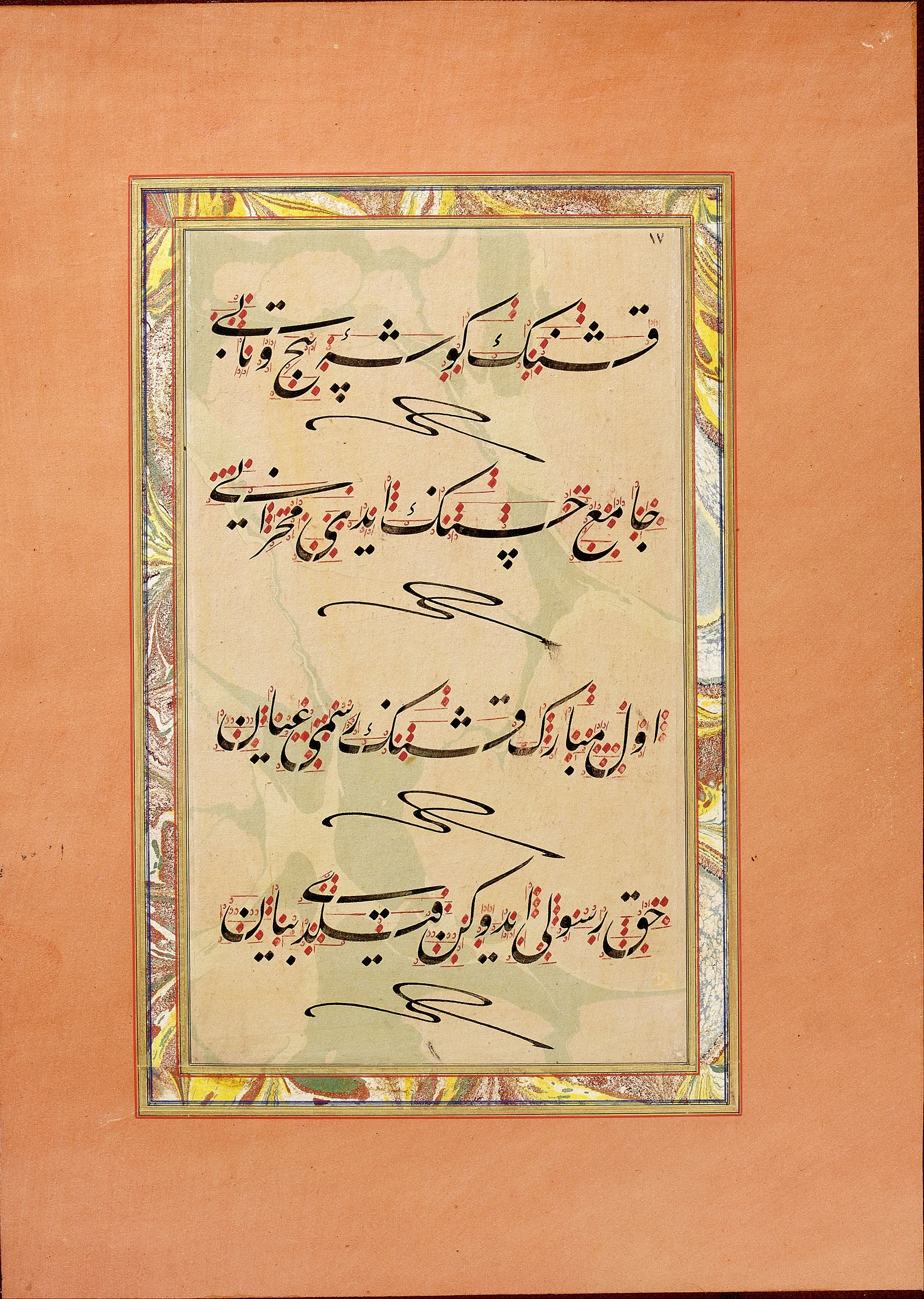
Page from the muraqqa with Khaqani's ode on the Prophet copied by Mehmed Nazif Bey from an original by Mustafa Izzet. 20th century (before 1913). Sakıp Sabancı Museum

== Shekasteh Nastaliq ==
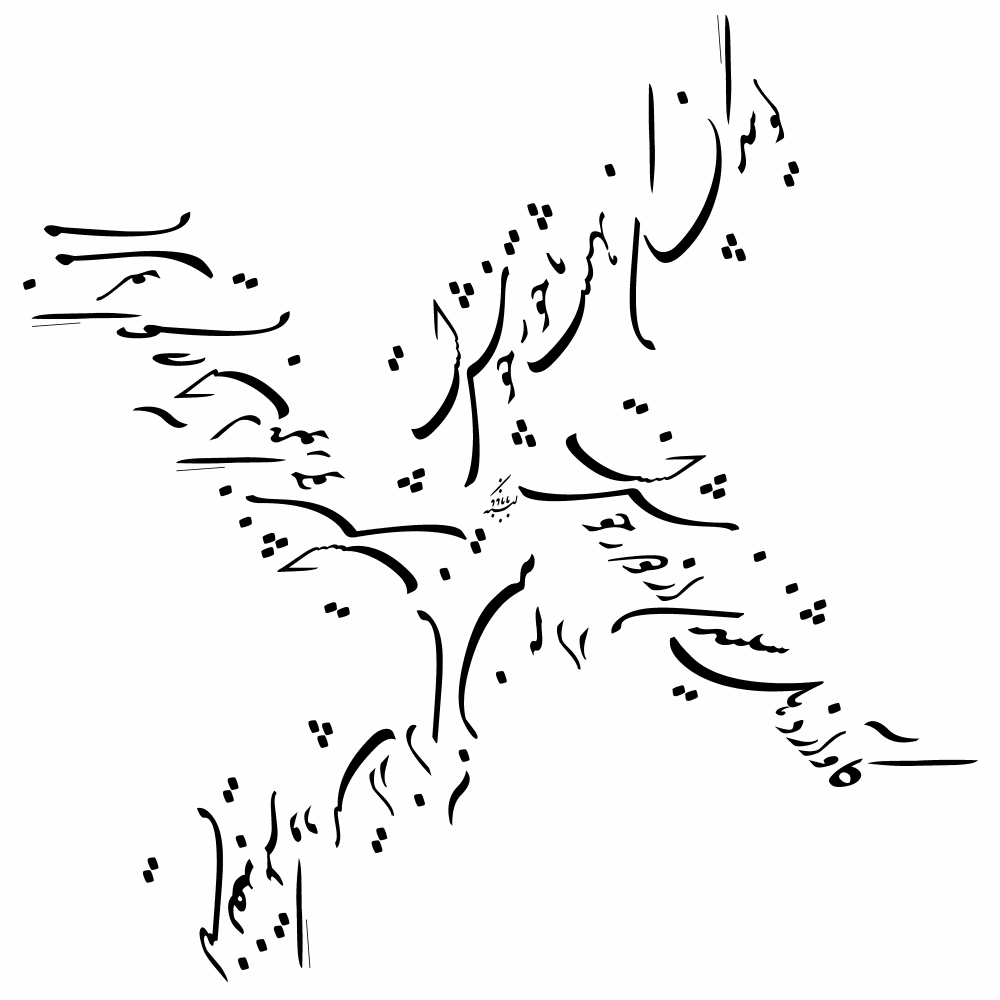
A rubaʿi of Omar Khayyam in Shekasteh Nastaliq. In print: گویند کسان بهشت با حور خوش است من میگویم که آب انگور خوش است این نقد بگیر و دست از آن نسیه بدار کاواز دهل شنیدن از دور خوش است In modern Naskh: گویند کسان بهشت با حور خوش است من میگویم که آب انگور خوش است این نقد بگیر و دست از آن نسیه بدار کاواز دهل شنیدن از دور خوش است

A line of poetry by the Iranian poet Omar Khayyam in Shekasteh Nastaliq. In print: این قافلهٔ عُمر عجب میگذرد In modern Naskh: این قافلهٔ عُمر عجب میگذرد

Shekasteh or Shekasteh Nastaliq (Persian: شکسته نستعلیق, شکسته نستعلیق, "cursive Nastaliq" or literally "broken Nastaliq") style is a "streamlined" form of Nastaliq. Its development is connected with the fact that "the increasing use of nastaʿlīq and consequent need to write it quickly exposed it to a process of gradual attrition." The shekasteh nastaliq emerged in the early 17th century and differed from proper nastaliq only in so far as some of the letters were shrunk (shekasteh, lit. "broken") and detached letters and words were sometimes joined. These unauthorized connections "mean that calligraphers can write shekasteh faster than any other script." Manuscripts from this early period show signs of the influence of shekasteh taliq; while having the appearance of a shrunken form of nastaliq, they also contain features of taliq "due to their being written by scribes who had been trained in taʿlīq." Shekasteh nastaliq (usually shortened to simply skehasteh), being more easily legible than taliq gradually replaced the latter as the script of decrees and documents. Later, it also came into use for writing prose and poetry.

The first important calligraphers of shekasteh were Mohammad Shafiʿ Heravi (d. 1670–71) (he was known as Shafiʿa and hence shekasteh was sometimes called shafiʿa or shifiʿa) and Mortazaqoli Khan Shamlu (d. 1688–89). Both of them produced works of real artistic quality, which does not change the fact that in this early phase shekasteh still lacked consistency (it is especially visible in writing of Mortazaqoli Khan Shamlu). Most modern scholars consider that shekasteh reached its peak of artistic perfection under Abdol Majid Taleqani (d. 1771), "who gave the script its distinctive and definite form." The tradition of Taleqani was later followed by Mirza Kuchek Esfahani (d. 1813), Gholam Reza Esfahani (d. 1886–87) and Ali Akbar Golestaneh (d. 1901).

The added frills made shekasteh increasingly difficult to read and it remained the script of documents and decrees, "while nastaʿliq retained its pre-eminence as the main calligraphic style." The need for simplification of shekasteh resulted in development of secretarial style (shekasteh-ye tahriri) by writers like Adib-al-Mamalek Farahani (d. 1917) and Nezam Garrusi (d. 1900). The secretarial style is a simplified form of shekasteh which is faster to write and read, but less artistic. Long used in governmental and other institutions in Iran, shekasteh degenerated in the first half of the 20th century, but later again engaged the attention of calligraphers. Shekasteh was used only in Iran and to a small extent in Afghanistan and Ottoman Empire. Its use in Afghanistan was different from the Persian norm and sometimes only as experimental devices (tafannon)

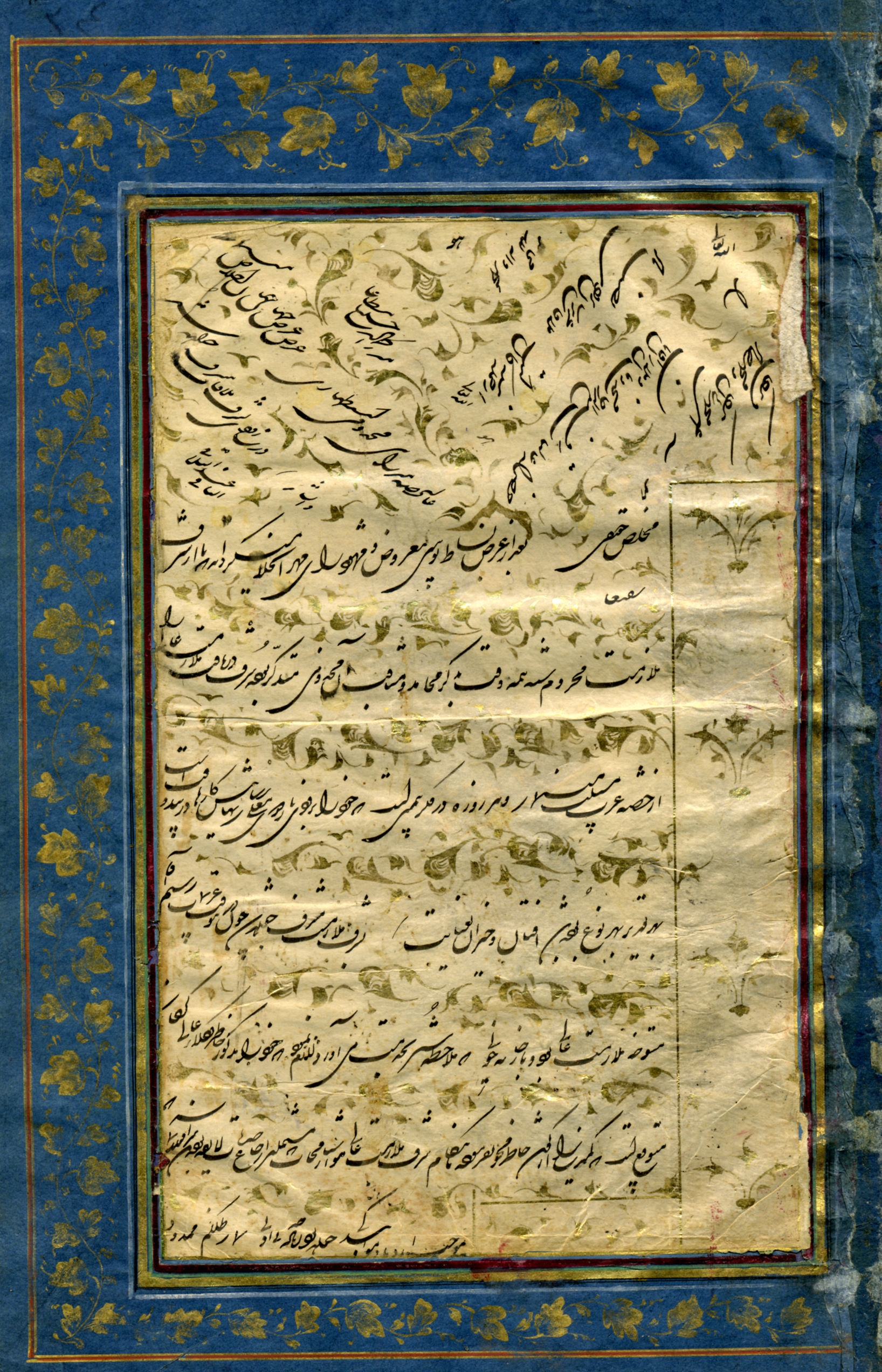
Calligraphy by Mohammad Shafiʿ Heravi. National Library of Iran

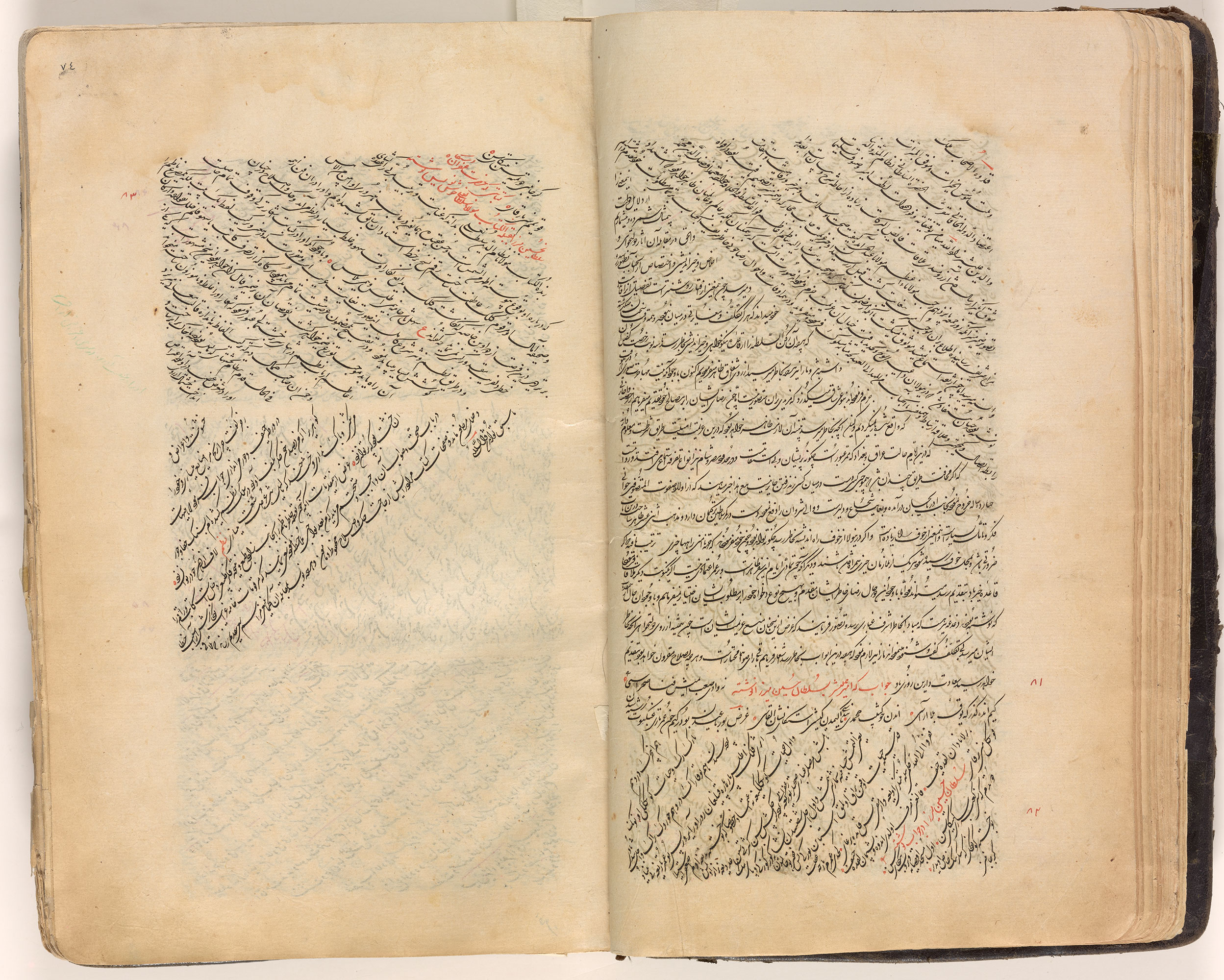
Double page from the "Majmu‘a-i munsh‘at" – collection of correspondence sent by Persian rulers compiled by Abu‘l-Qasim Ivughli Haydar. Isfahan, 1682. Arthur M. Sackler Gallery

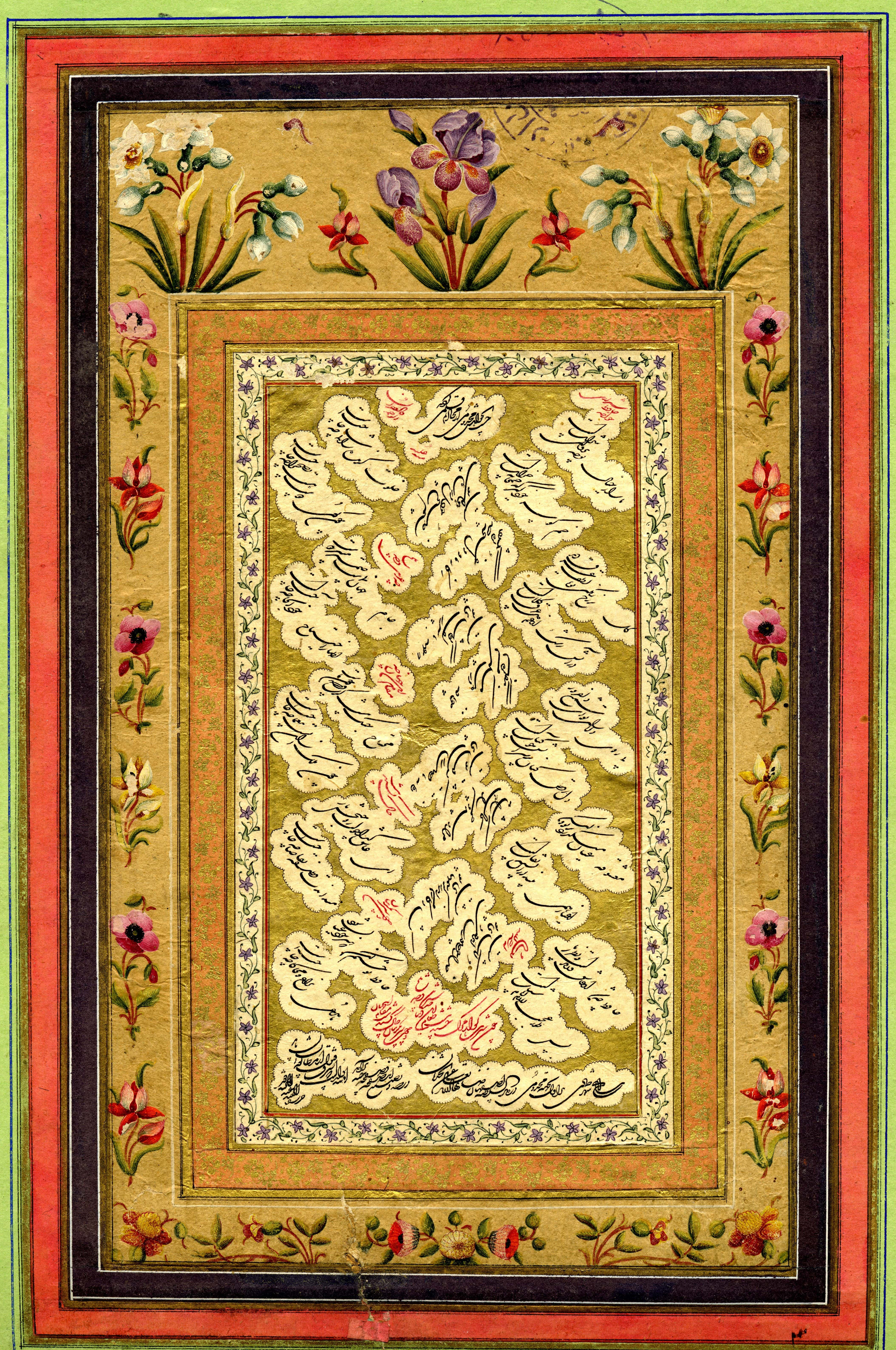
Calligraphy by Abdol Majid Taleqani. Golestan Palace Library

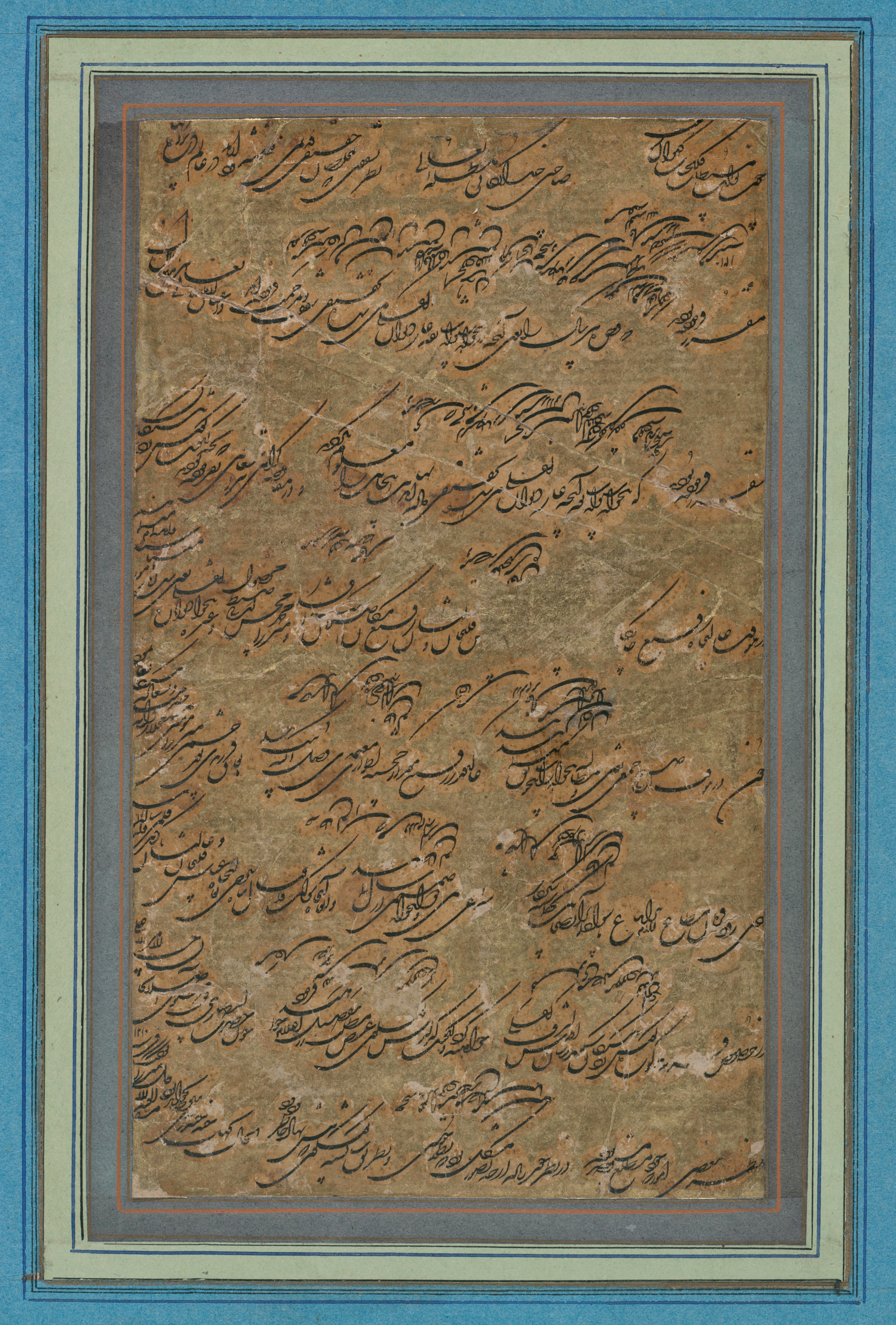
Plea for tax relief copied by Mirza Kuchak Esfahani. Iran, 1795–1796. Harvard Art Museums

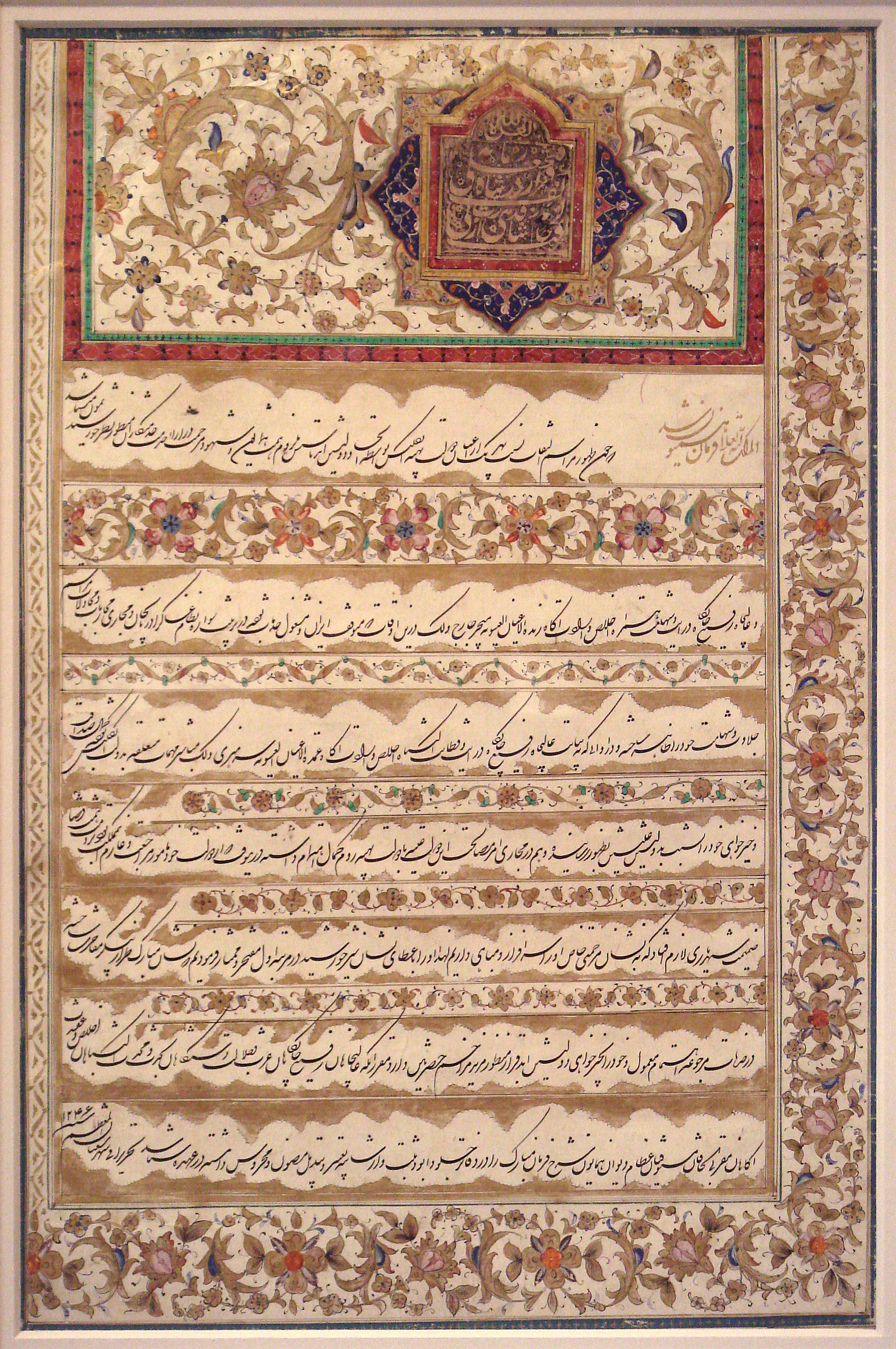
Firman issued in the Name of Fath-Ali Shah Qajar. Iran, January 1831. Metropolitan Museum of Art

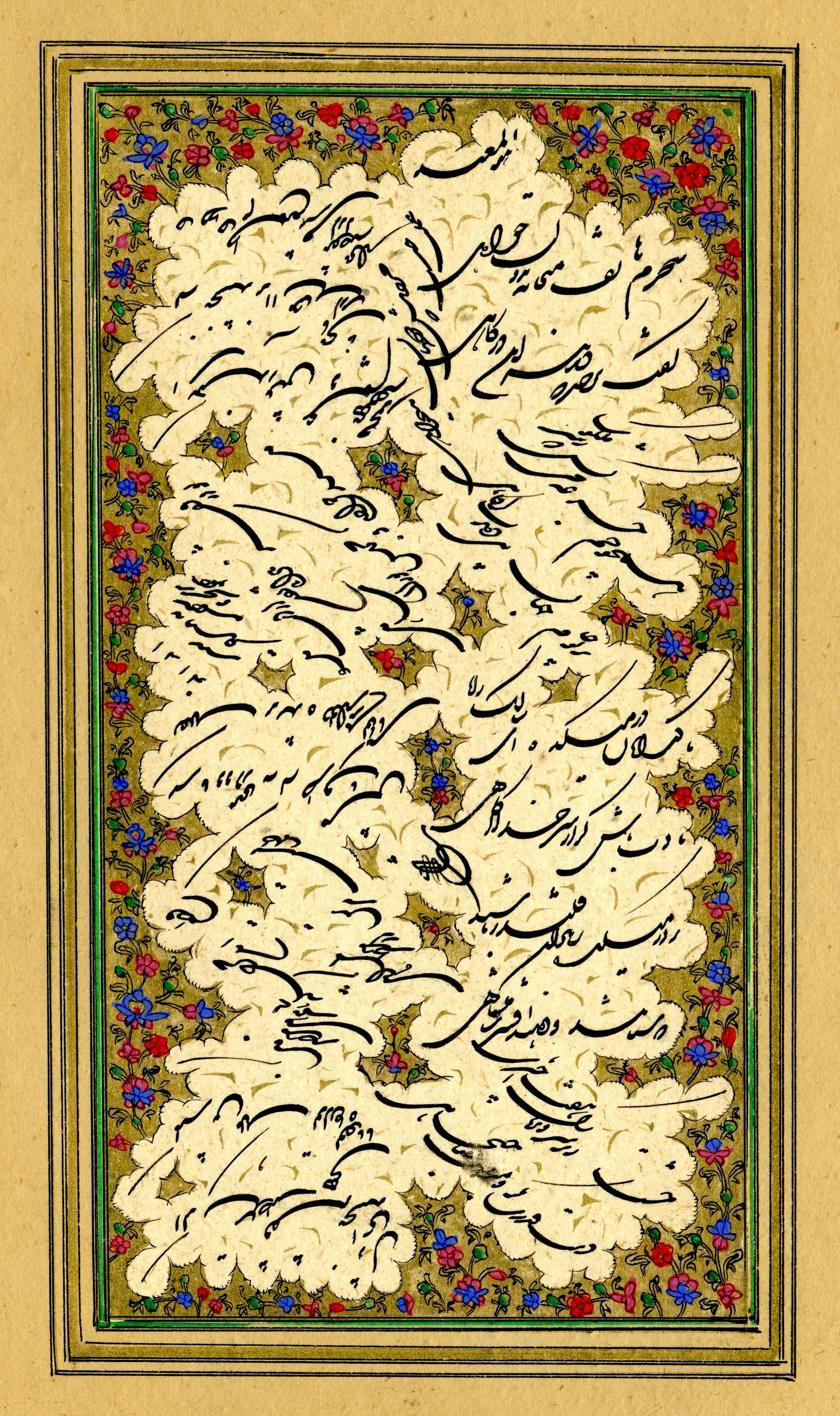
Calligraphy by Ali Akbar Golestaneh. Iran, 1896. Library of the Islamic Parliament of Iran

== Nastaliq typesetting ==
Modern Nastaliq typography began with the invention of Noori Nastaliq which was first created as a digital font in 1981 through the collaboration of Ahmed Mirza Jamil (as calligrapher) and Monotype Imaging (formerly Monotype Corp & Monotype Typography). Although this employed over 20,000 ligatures (individually designed character combinations), it provided accurate results and allowed newspapers such as Pakistan's Daily Jang to use digital typesetting instead of a group of calligraphers. It suffered from two problems in the 1990s: its non-availability on standard platforms such as Microsoft Windows or Mac OS, and the non-WYSIWYG nature of text entry, whereby the document had to be created by commands in Monotype's proprietary page description language.

Examples of Nastaliq typesetting
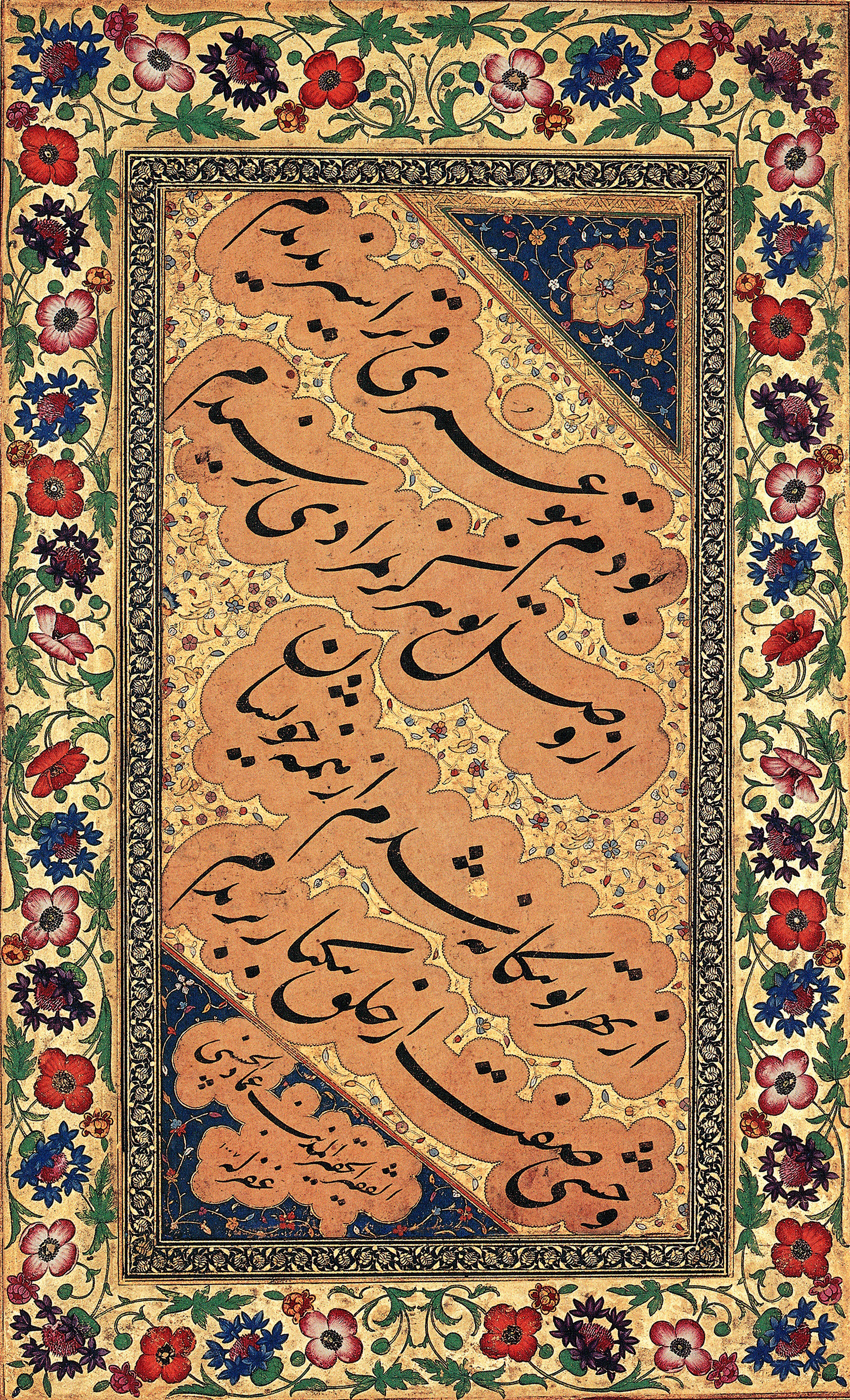
Persian Chalipa panel, Mir Emad
In print:^{[note]}
بودم به تو عمری و ترا سیر ندیدم
از وصل تو هرگز به مرادی نرسیدم
از بهر تو بیگانه شدم از همه خویشان
وحشی صفت از خلق به یکبار بریدم
In Naskh styled typeface:
بودم به تو عمری و ترا سیر ندیدم
از وصل تو هرگز به مرادی نرسیدم
از بهر تو بیگانه شدم از همه خویشان
وحشی صفت از خلق به یکبار بریدم

An example of the Nastaliq script used for writing Urdu.
Nastaliq:
؎ کیا تنگ ہم ستم زدگان کا جہاں ہے
جس میں ایک بیضۂ مور آسماں ہے
Naskh:
؎ کیا تنگ ہم ستم زدگان کا جہاں ہے
جس میں ایک بیضۂ مور آسماں ہے

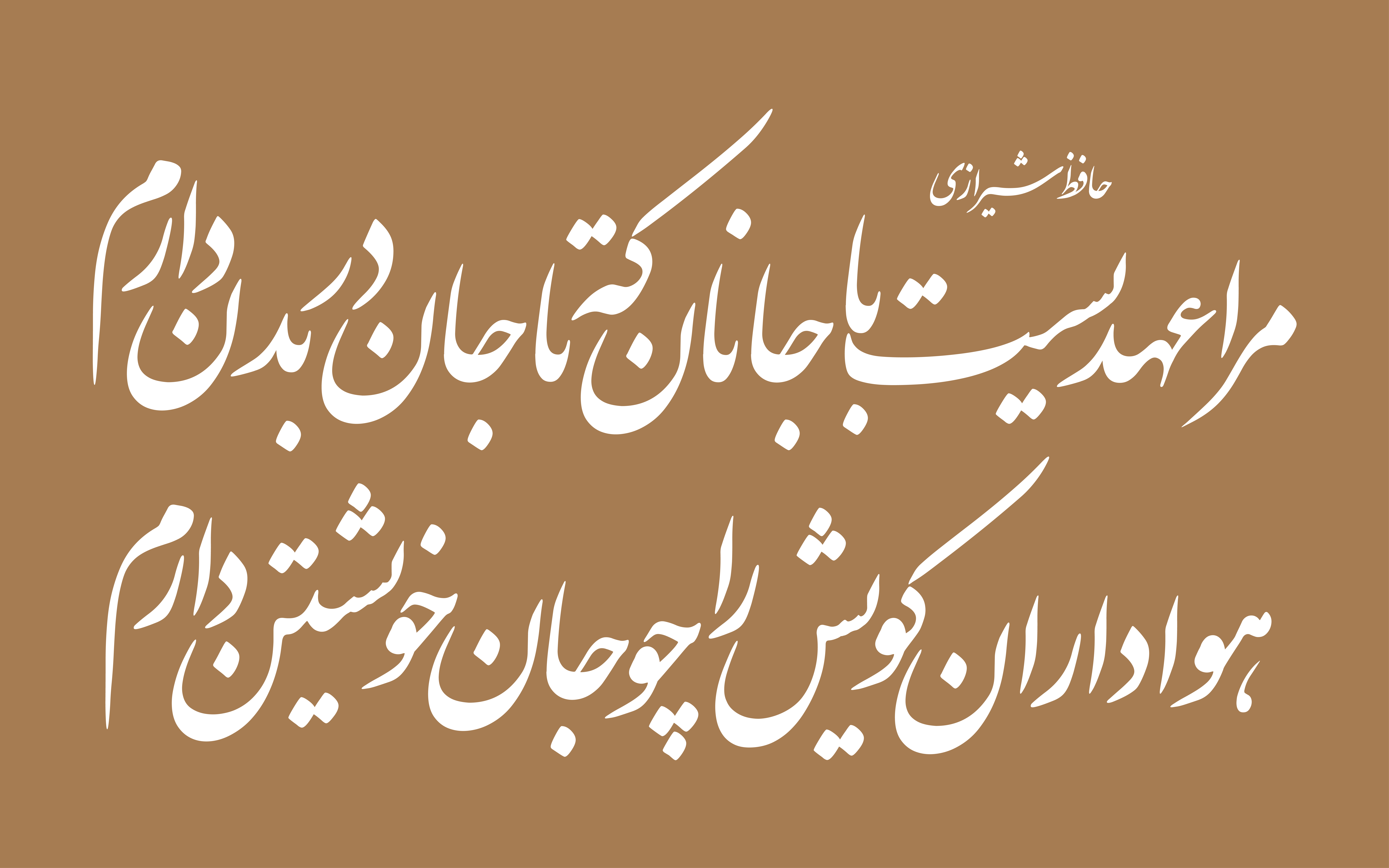
A couplet versified by the Persian poet Hafez in Nastaliq font (by Software), in print:^{[note]}
حافظ شیرازی
مرا عهدیست با جانان که تا جان در بدن دارم
هواداران کویش را چو جان خویشتن دارم
in a Naskh styled typeface:
حافظ شیرازی
مرا عهدیست با جانان که تا جان در بدن دارم
هواداران کویش را چو جان خویشتن دارم

=== InPage ===
In 1994, InPage Urdu, which is a functional page layout software for Windows akin to QuarkXPress, was developed for Pakistan's newspaper industry by an Indian software company Concept Software Pvt Ltd. It offered the Noori Nastaliq font licensed from Monotype Imaging. This font is still used in current versions of the software for Windows. As of 2009, InPage has become Unicode based, supporting more languages and the Faiz Lahori Nastaliq font with Kasheeda has been added to it along with compatibility with OpenType Unicode fonts.

=== Cross platform Nastaliq fonts ===
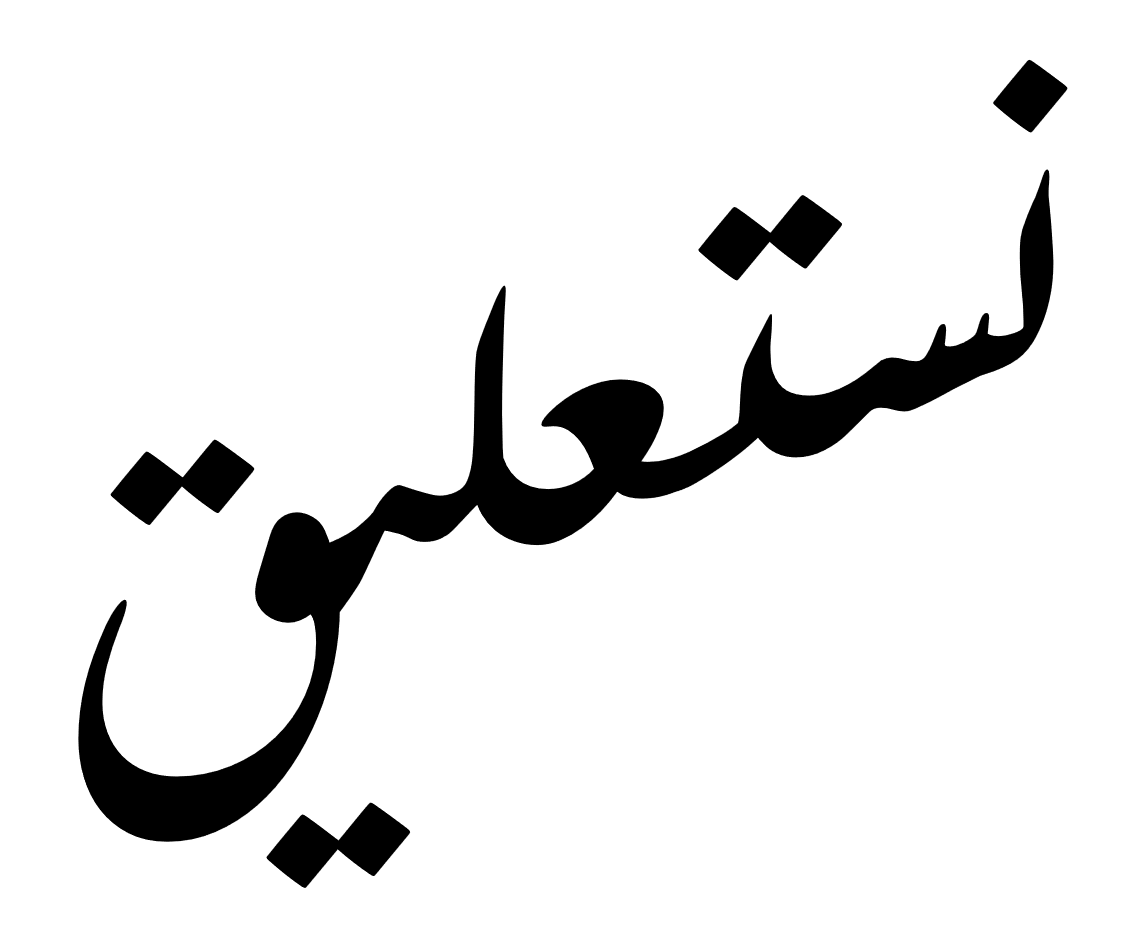
Text: نستعلیق in the font "Urdu Typesetting".

- Windows 8 was the first version of Microsoft Windows to have native Nastaliq support, through Microsoft's "Urdu Typesetting" font.

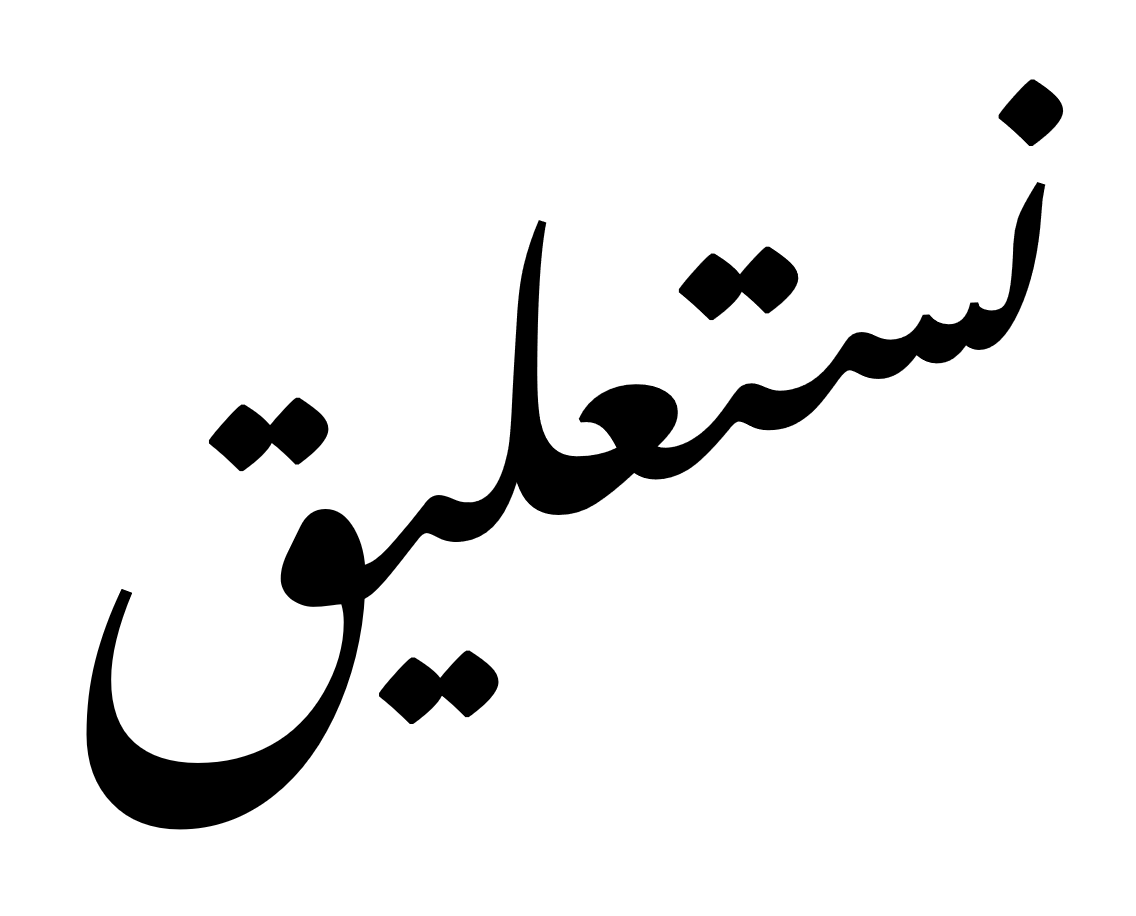
Text: نستعلیق in the font "Noto Nastaliq".

- Noto Nastaliq Google has an open-source Nastaliq font called Noto Nastaliq Urdu. Apple provides this font on all Mac installations since macOS High Sierra. Likewise, Apple has carried this font on iOS devices since iOS 11.
- Awami Nastaliq features a more extensive character set than most Nastaliq typefaces, supporting: Urdu, Balochi, Persian, Khowar, Palula, Saraiki, Shina.
- Amar Nastaleeq was created for web embedding on Urdu websites in 2013. The font was announced by Urdu poet Fahmida Riaz.
- PDMS Nastaliq Nafees
- Ali Nastaliq
- Iran Nastaliq
- Jauhar Nastaliq
- Mehr Nastaliq
- Urdu Emad Nastaliq
- Gulzar Nastaliq

== Letter forms ==
The Nastaliq style uses more than three general forms for many letters, even in non-decorative documents. For example, most documents written in Urdu use the Nastaliq style.

== In Unicode ==
Nastaliq is not separately encoded in Unicode as it is a particular style of Arabic script and not a writing system in its own right. Nastaliq letterforms are produced by choosing a Nastaliq font to display the text.

== See also ==
- Islamic calligraphy
- Persian calligraphy
- Naskh script
- Shahmukhi script
- Urdu alphabet
- Ruqʿah script
- Chalipa panel

== Bibliography ==
- Blair, Sheila (2008). Islamic Calligraphy. Edinburgh University Press. ISBN 978-0748612123.
