= Chalipa =

Panel in the Nastaliq script

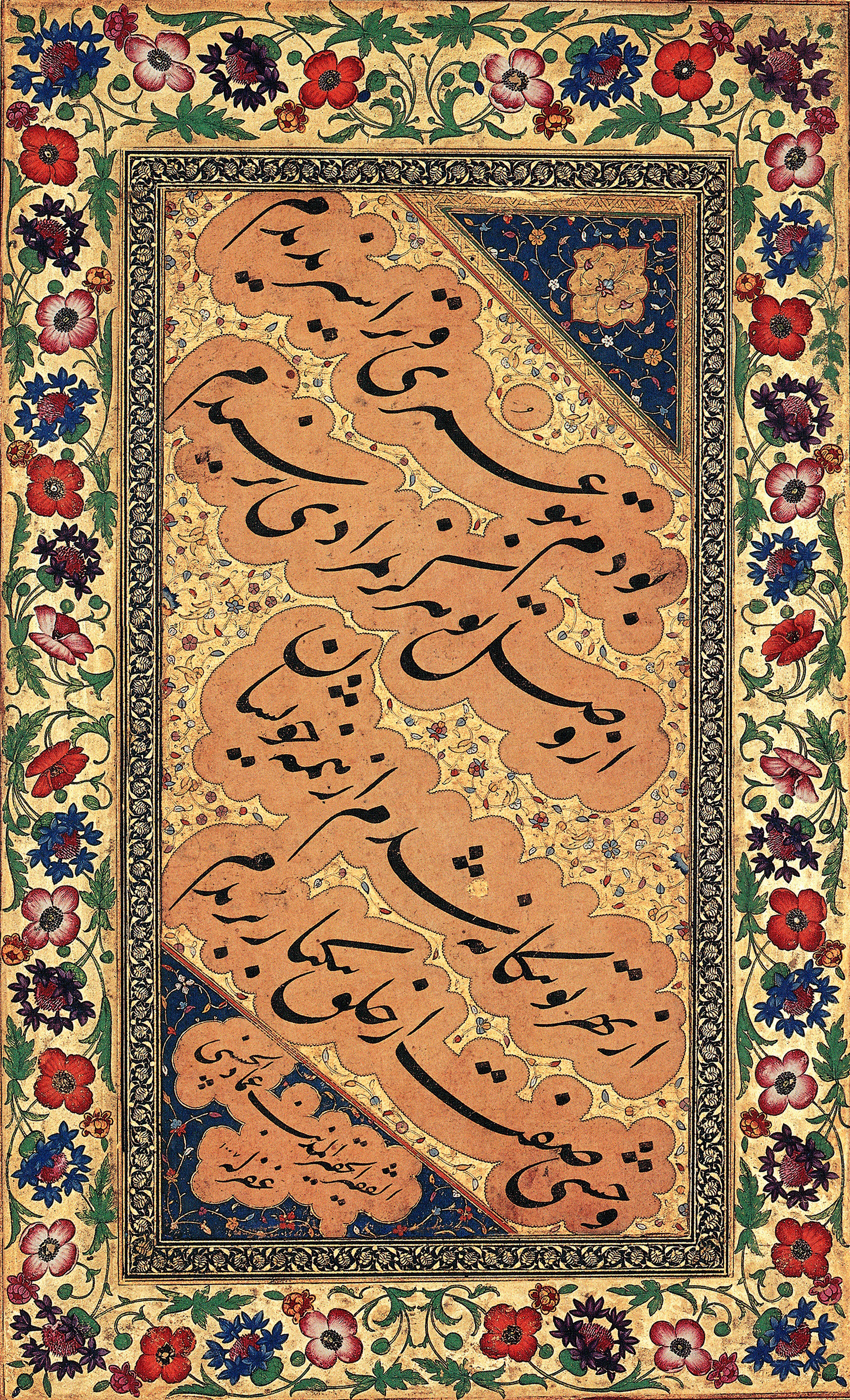
A chalipa by Mir Emad

Chalipa (Persian: چلیپا, romanized: chalīpā, lit. 'cross') is a panel in the Nastaliq script created by Mir Emad Hassani. There are two important panels in the Nastaliq calligraphy: Chalipa and Siah Mashgh. Chalipa consists of four diagonal hemistiches of a poem, which has clearly a moral, ethical and poetic theme.

== See also ==
- Islamic calligraphy
- Persian calligraphy
- Urdu alphabet
- Islamic poetry
