= Awami Nastaliq =

- Date released: 2014
- License: SIL Open Font License
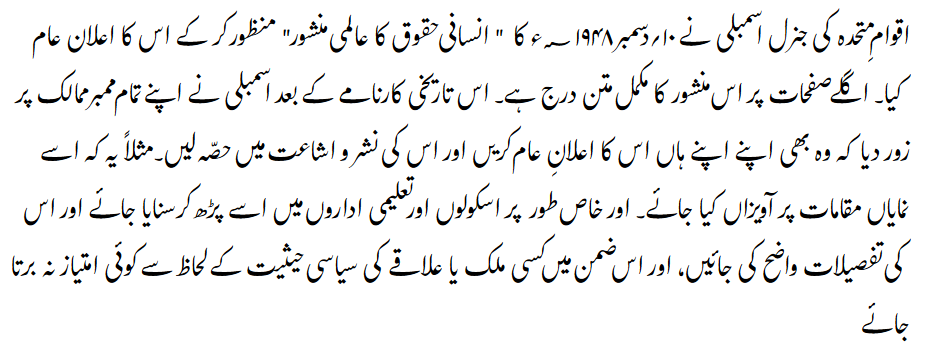
- Sample
- Website: software.sil.org/awami/

Awami Nastaliq (Awami derived from the adjectival form for Urdu word awam) is a Nasta'liq-script font designed by SIL's Peter Martin for Graphite aware applications. It requires a recent version of Firefox, LibreOffice, XeTeX, etc. to render correctly, and aiming at a wide variety of languages of southwest Asia, including but not limited to Urdu. It also provides a number of user-selectable font features available via 4-byte character tags to produce character variants and variable word spacing.

The font is available under the Open Font License.

== External resources ==
- Awami Nastaliq at SIL International
