= Mirza Gholam Reza Esfahani =

Master of Persian calligraphy (1830/31–1887)

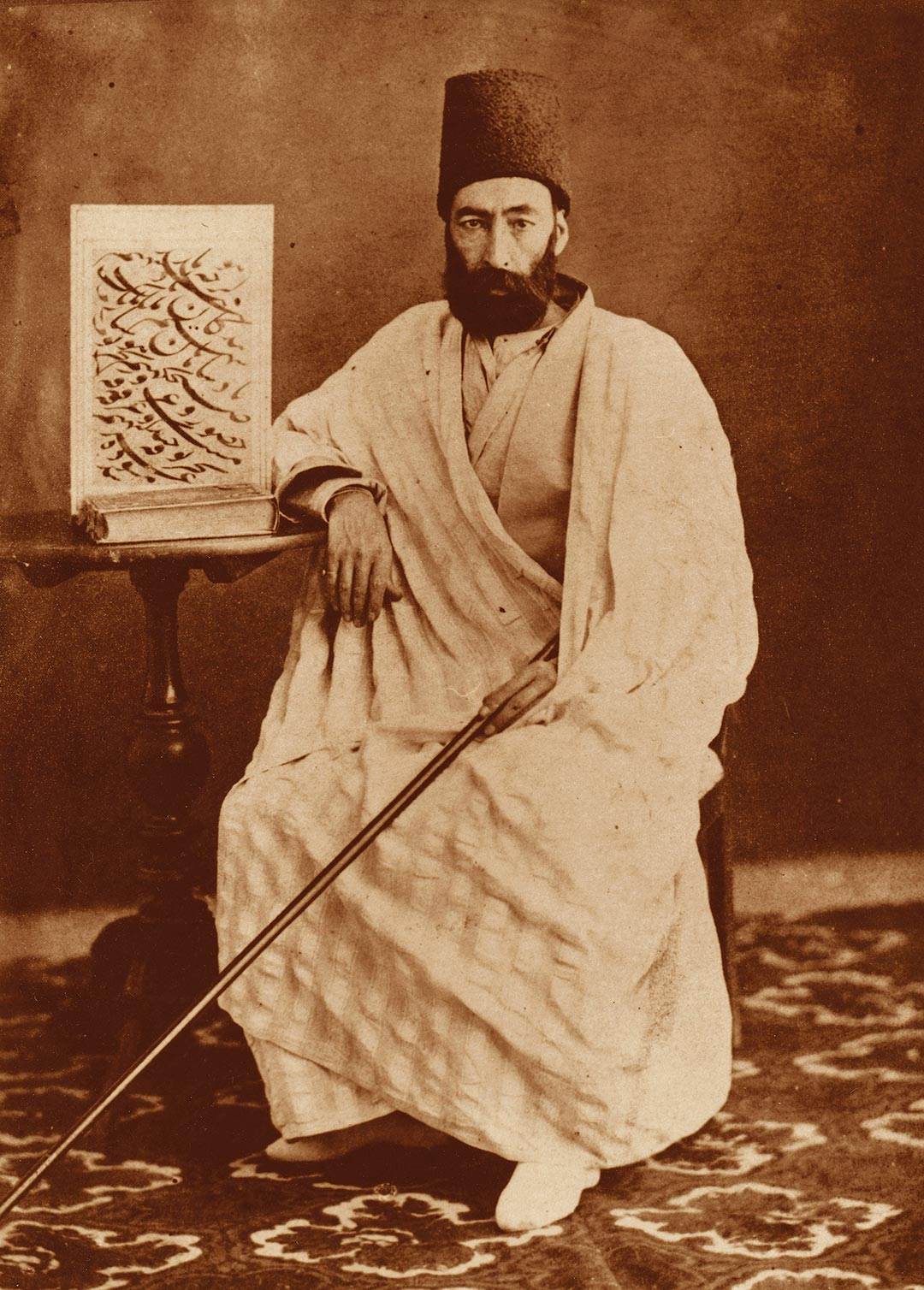
- Born: 1830 or 1831; Isfahan, Qajar Iran
- Died: 1 March 1887
- Resting place: Cheshmeh-Ali, Shahr-e-Rey; 35.6023989°N 51.4436908°E
- Known for: Persian Calligraphy
- Style: Nastaliq, Shekasteh Nastaliq

Signature
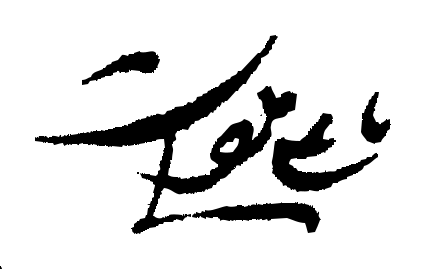

Mirza Gholam Reza Esfahani (Persian: میرزا غلام‌رضا اصفهانی; 1830/31 – 1 March 1887), also known as Khoshnevis, was a late 19th-century Iranian calligrapher and epigraphist. He was a master of Persian calligraphy, in particular the Nastaliq, Shekasteh-Nastaliq and Shekasteh scripts. He signed his works with two invocations, either "Ya Ali madad" or "Gholam Reza, Ya Ali madadast".

== Gallery ==
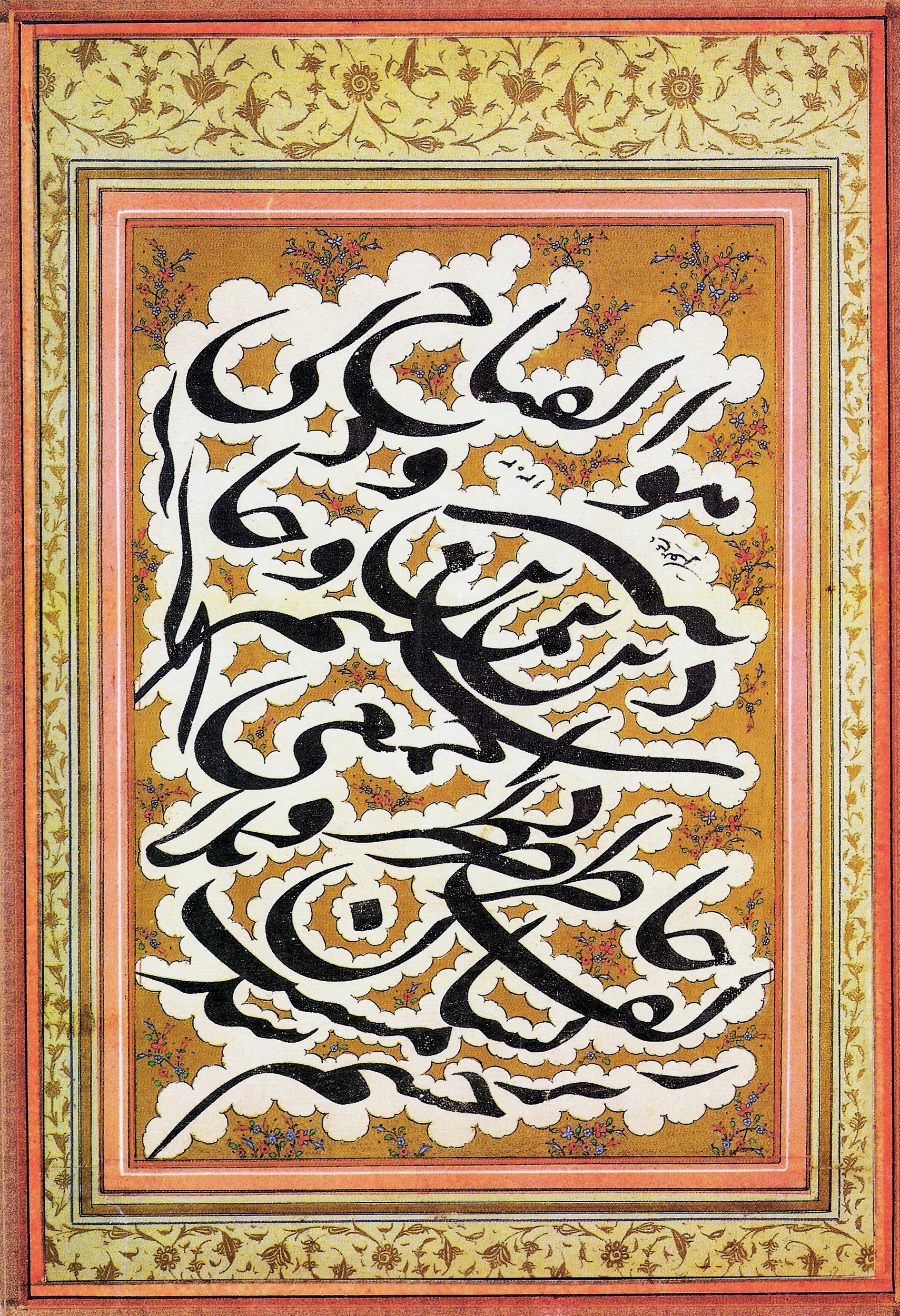

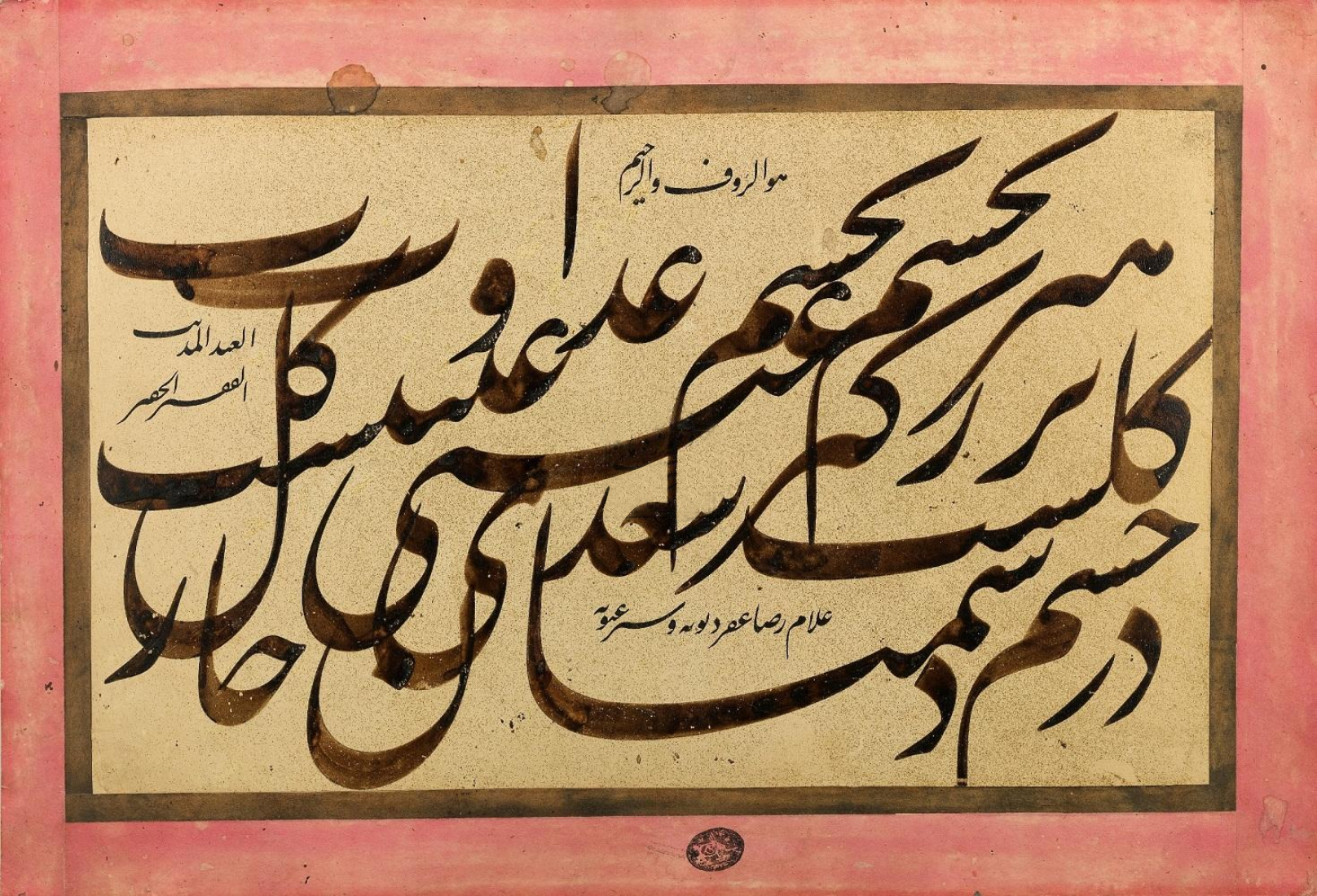

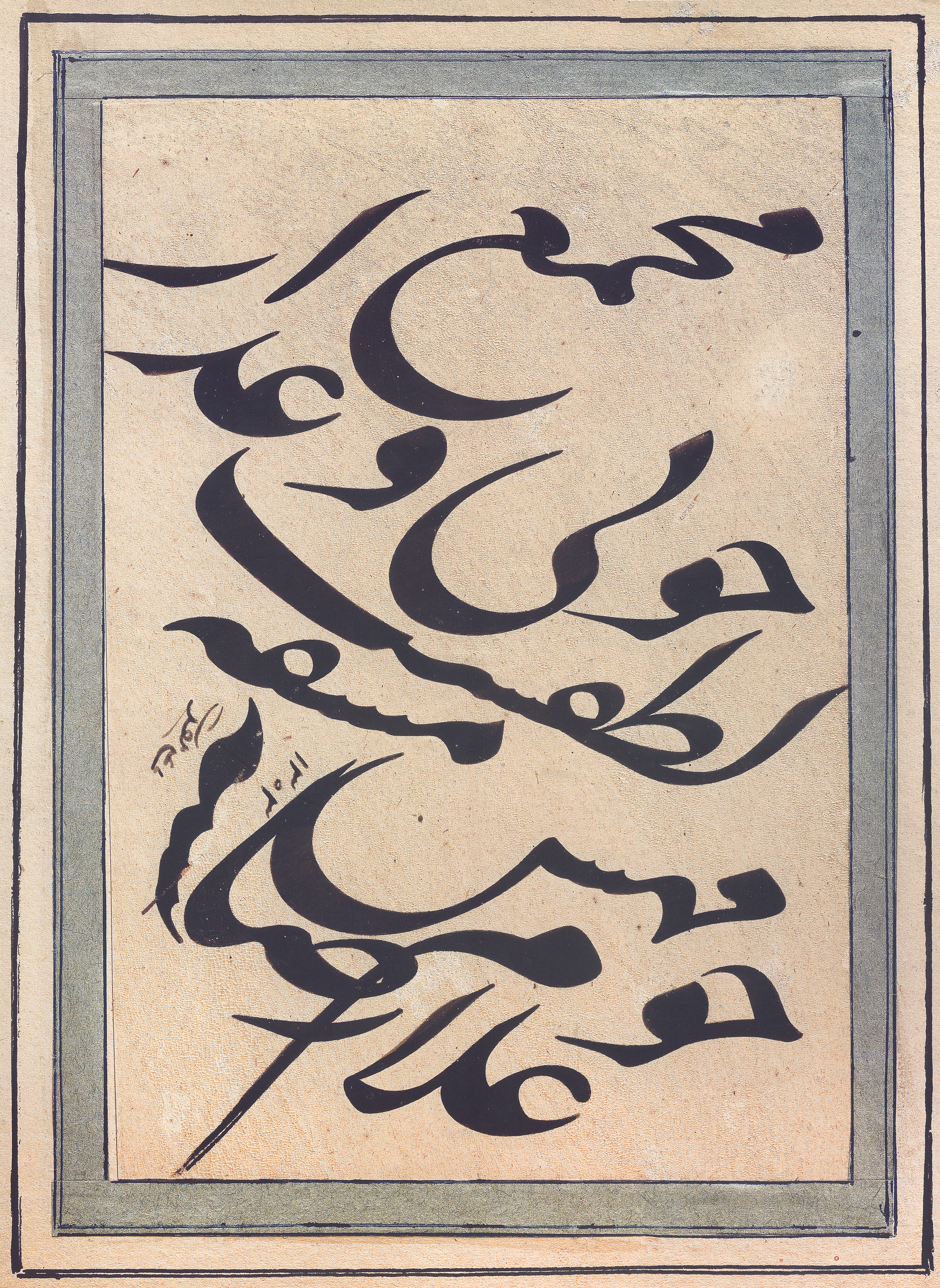

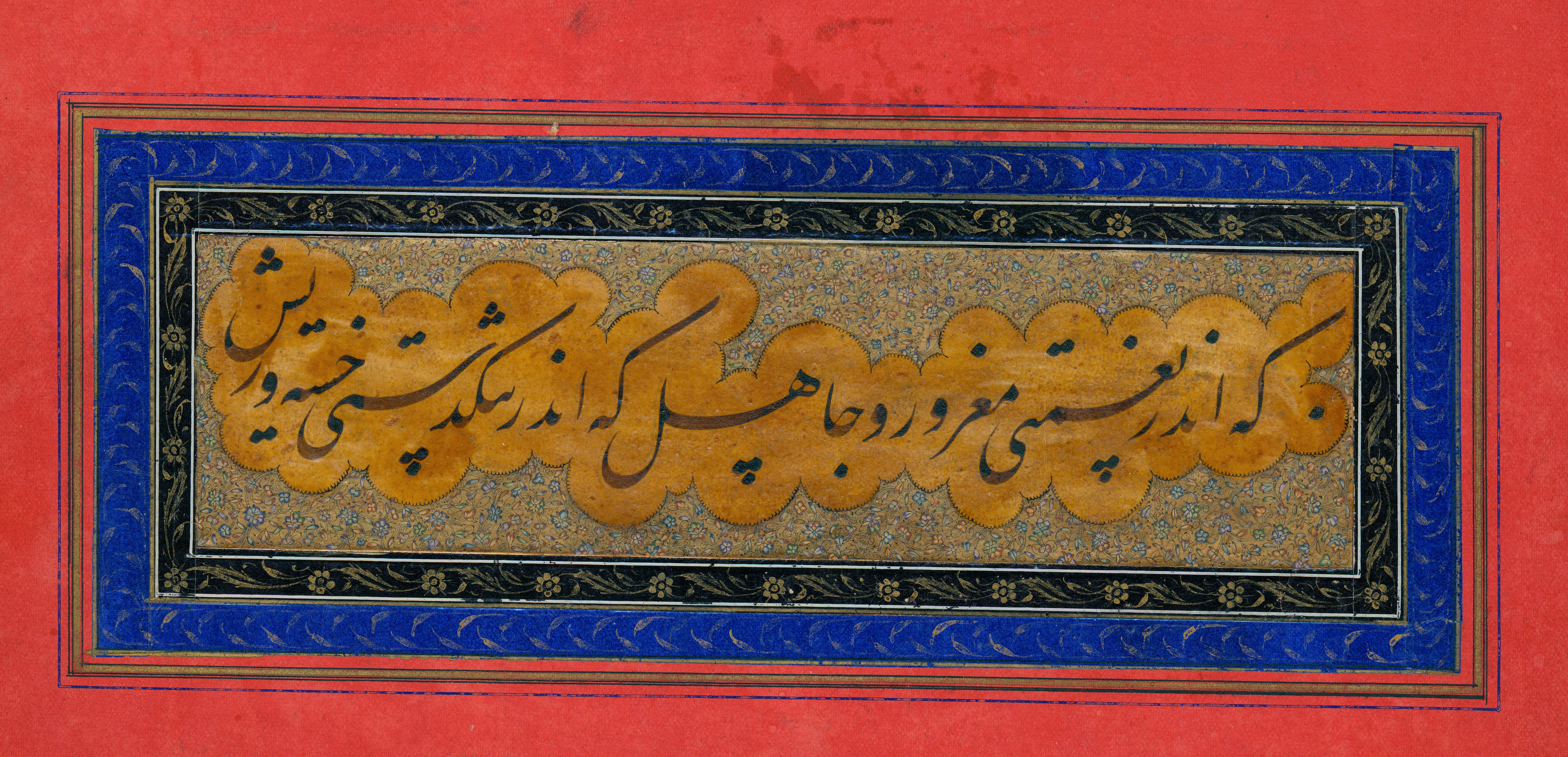
