= Ali Reza Abbasi =

Persian calligrapher (1500s–1600s)

Ali Reza Abbasi Tabrizi
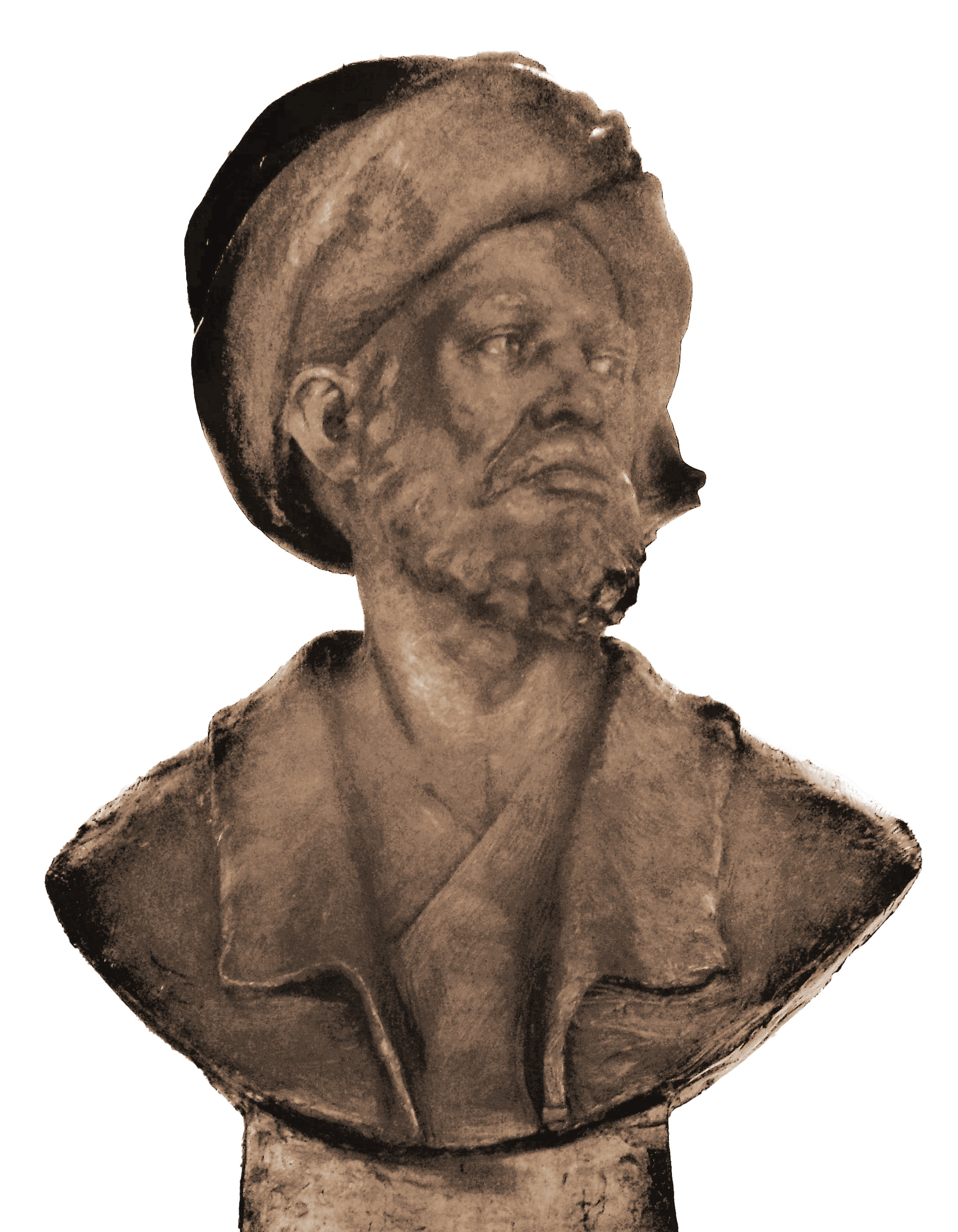
- Born: Late 1500's
- Died: 1600's
- Occupations: Calligrapher and calligraphy teacher

Ali Reza Abbasi Tabrizi (Persian: علیرضا عباسی تبریزی) was a prominent Persian calligrapher and calligraphy teacher, who flourished in 16th-17th century Safavid Iran. He was titled by Shah Abbas I as Šāhnavāz Xān. Abbasi was a master of Naskh and Thuluth scripts and the initiator of his own style of Nastaʿlīq script. Besides he was an expert of various other scripts like Muhaqqaq, Reqa, Reyhan, Tevki and Taʿlīq scripts.

== Youth ==
Ali Reza Abbasi started learning calligraphy in Tabriz as a pupil of Mohammad Hossein Tabrizi and Ala Beyk. Abbasi obtained an outstanding knowledge of Thuluth and Naskh scripts. After that the Ottomans occupied Tabriz during the reign of Mohammad Khodabanda, Abbasi left the city and went to Qazvin, the capital of the Safavid dynasty. He lived there in the Jameh mosque of Qazvin. He worked as a calligrapher and completed some parts of inscriptions of the mosque and also some Koran samples. His works on the Jameh mosque of Qazvin made him famous.

In the early years of the reign of Abbas I, he was in Farhad Khan's employ, who was an important Sardar of the Safavids and his rank and dignity was increasing under Abbass I. When Sardar Farhad Khan noticed that Alireza Abbasi was an able artist, he appointed him as his personal companion and took Abbasi as his companion to Khorasan and Mazandaran.

== In the Safavid court ==
Alireza Abbasi's fame increased. On 1 July 1593, Abbasi became the shah's intimate friend and the shah instructed some calligraphers like Mohammad Reza Emami, Mohammad Saleh Esfahani and Abd ol-Baghi Tabrizi to teach Abbasi the Thuluth script.

He had a son named Badi al-Zaman Tabrizi.

Abbasi's death date in unknown, but it is supposed that he died towards the end of Safi's era.
