= Abd ol-Baghi Tabrizi =

Iranian calligrapher (died 1629)

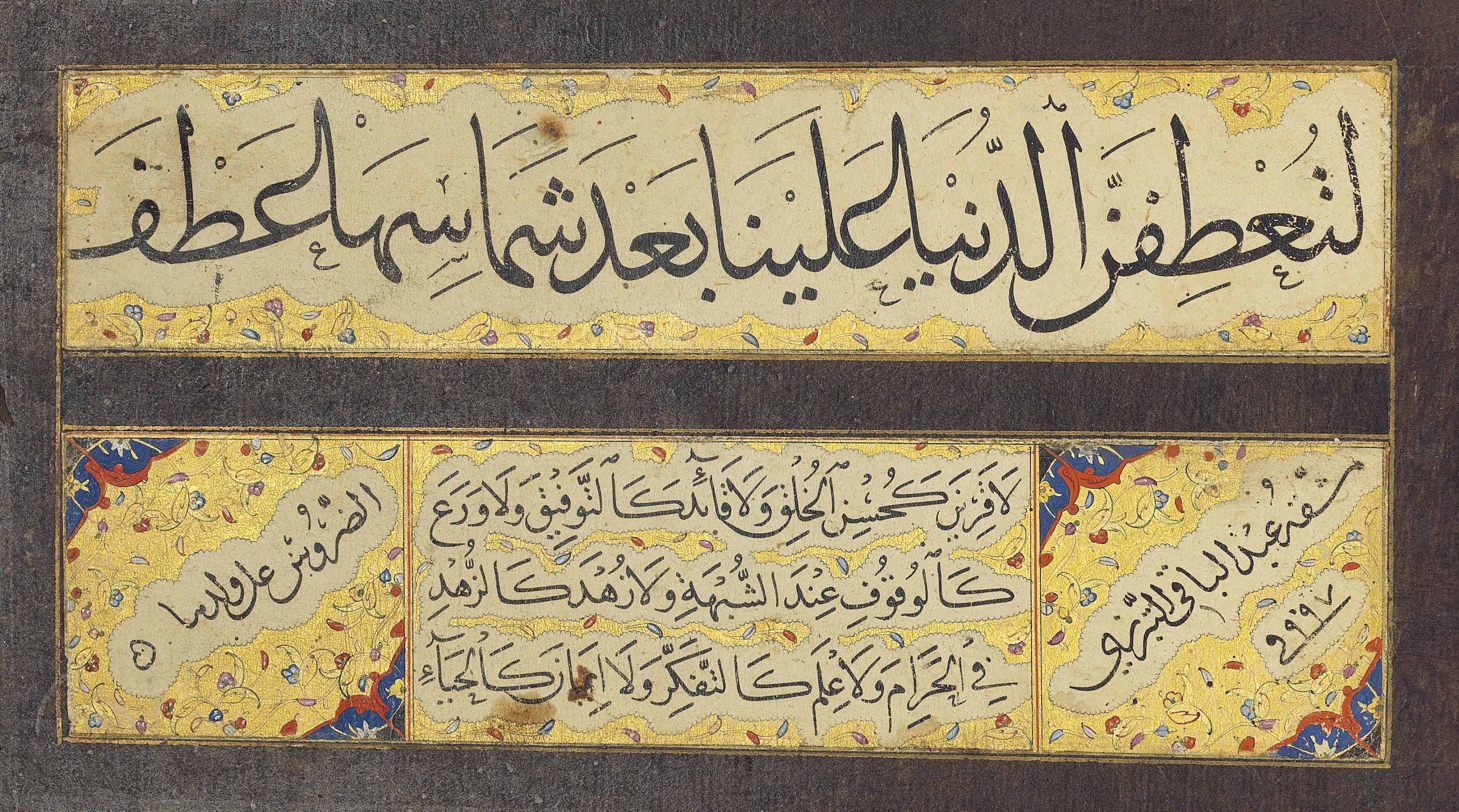
Persian calligraphy of Abd ol-Baghi Tabrizi, dated 1588-89. The panel contains a ruling attributed to Ali from the Nahj al-Balagha

Abd ol-Baghi Tabrizi (Persian: عبدالباقی تبریزی; died 1629) was a prominent Iranian calligrapher during the reign of Safavid dynasty. He was specially an expert in the Thuluth, Naskh and Reqa script. He lived during the era of Abbas I and was a student of Alaeddin Tabrizi and Ali Reza Abbassi. He died in 1629.
