= Akhmaqaya =

Akhmaqaya is an ancient and historic district in southwestern of Tabriz. Akhmaqaya has a great and old cemetery which has hundreds of old carved tombstones and ram sculptures. The largest of these tombstones belongs to Khajeh Amineddin Sadaqeh, that has been dug beautiful inscriptions in Thuluth script on the upper margin of its walls.

Akhmaqaya in Azerbaijani language means "shedding rock".

== Sources ==
- Akhmaqaya Cemetery
