= Timurid Quran manuscript =

15th-century Quranic manuscript

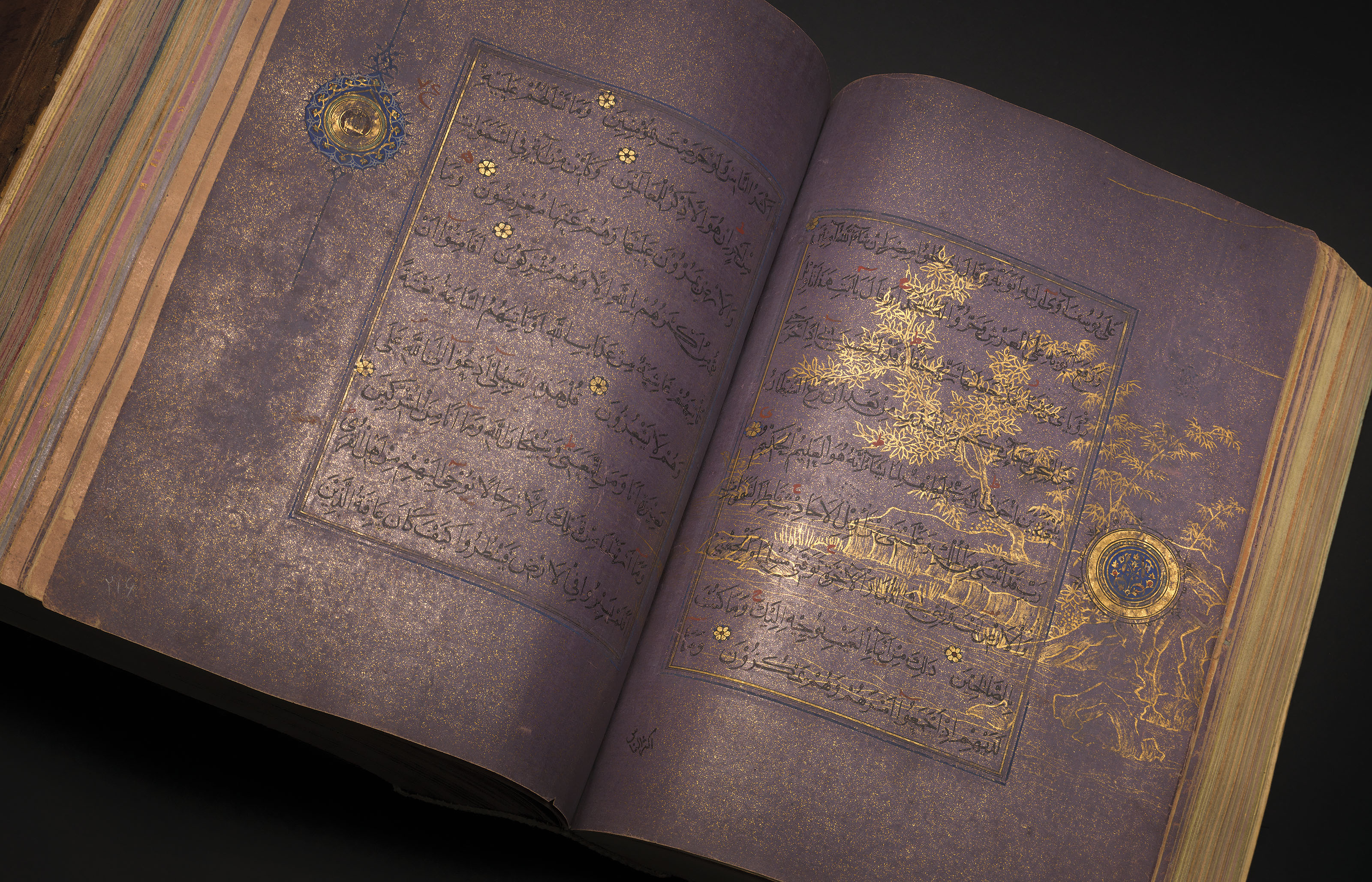
- Folia from the manuscript consisting of purple paper, with a depiction of a tree on the right
- Also known as: Aqquyunlu Quran
- Date: 15th-century CE
- Place of origin: Iran
- Language(s): Arabic
- Scribe(s): Unknown
- Material: Paper
- Size: 22.6 x 15.5cm; 534 folios
- Format: Vertical
- Script: Naskh; Thuluth

The Timurid Quran manuscript, also known as the Aqquyunlu Quran manuscript, is a 15th-century Timurid Quranic manuscript written on paper produced in the Ming dynasty. On 25 June 2020, it was sold at auction by Christie's for £7,016,250, surpassing its estimated value more than twelve-fold and rendering it the most expensive Quranic manuscript ever sold at the time.

== Description ==
The manuscript consists of 534 folios, sized 22.6 x 15.5cm, largely comprising dyed, gold-flecked paper manufactured in Ming China. Infused with lead white, the paper is described as having a soft and silk-like texture. It is variously coloured pink, purple, cream, orange, blue and turquoise, with some pages containing depictions of landscapes, flora and birds. The Arabic is written using naskh script, with thuluth script used for titling surahs and the thirty juz'.

== Controversy ==
The sale of the manuscript was condemned by several academics, who argued that doing so undermined its historical, cultural and spiritual value. Questions were also raised over its provenance, with critics stating that concealment by Christie's of its details before the 1980s could obscure possible instances of looting and trafficking.

== Gallery ==
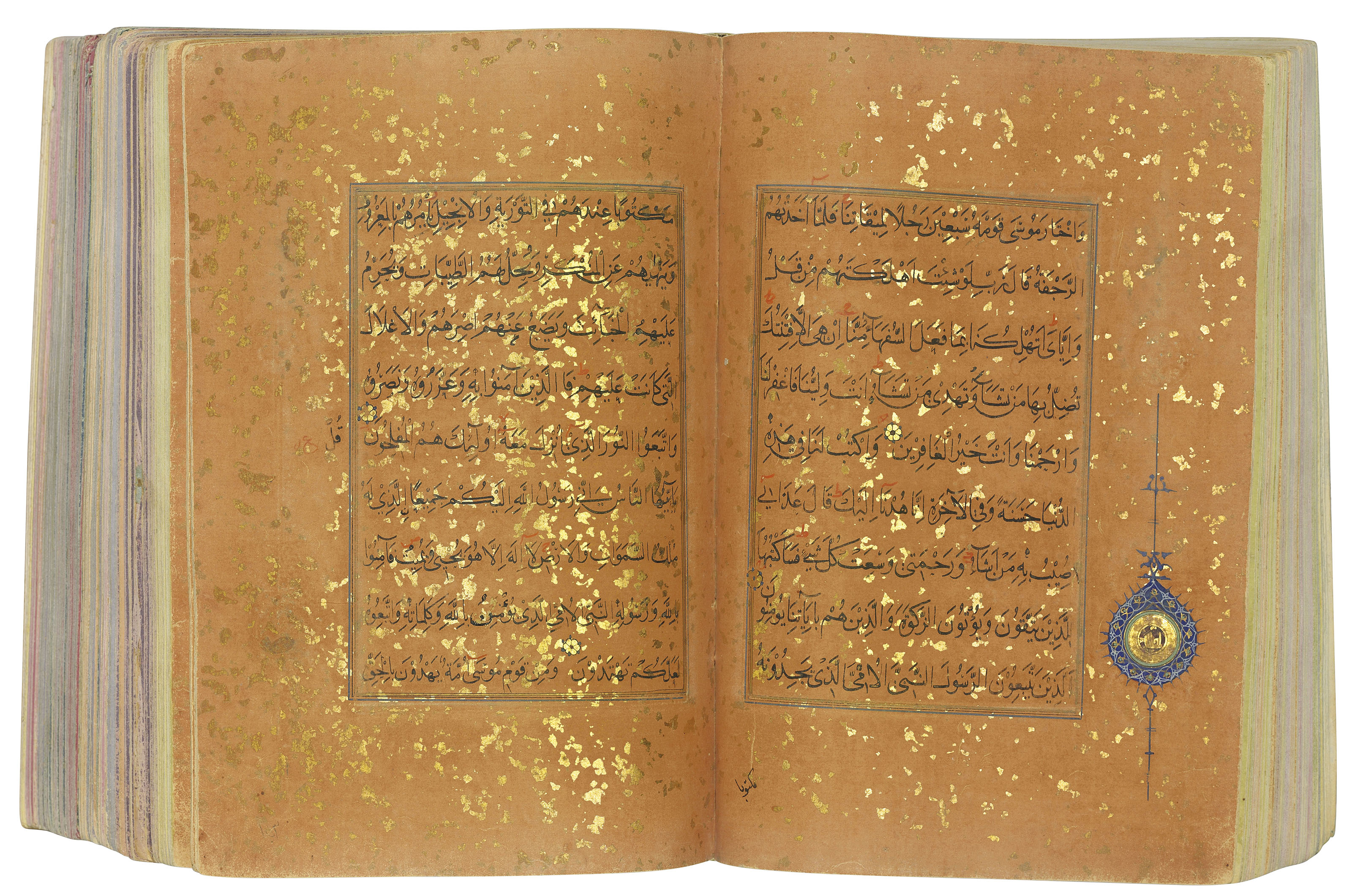

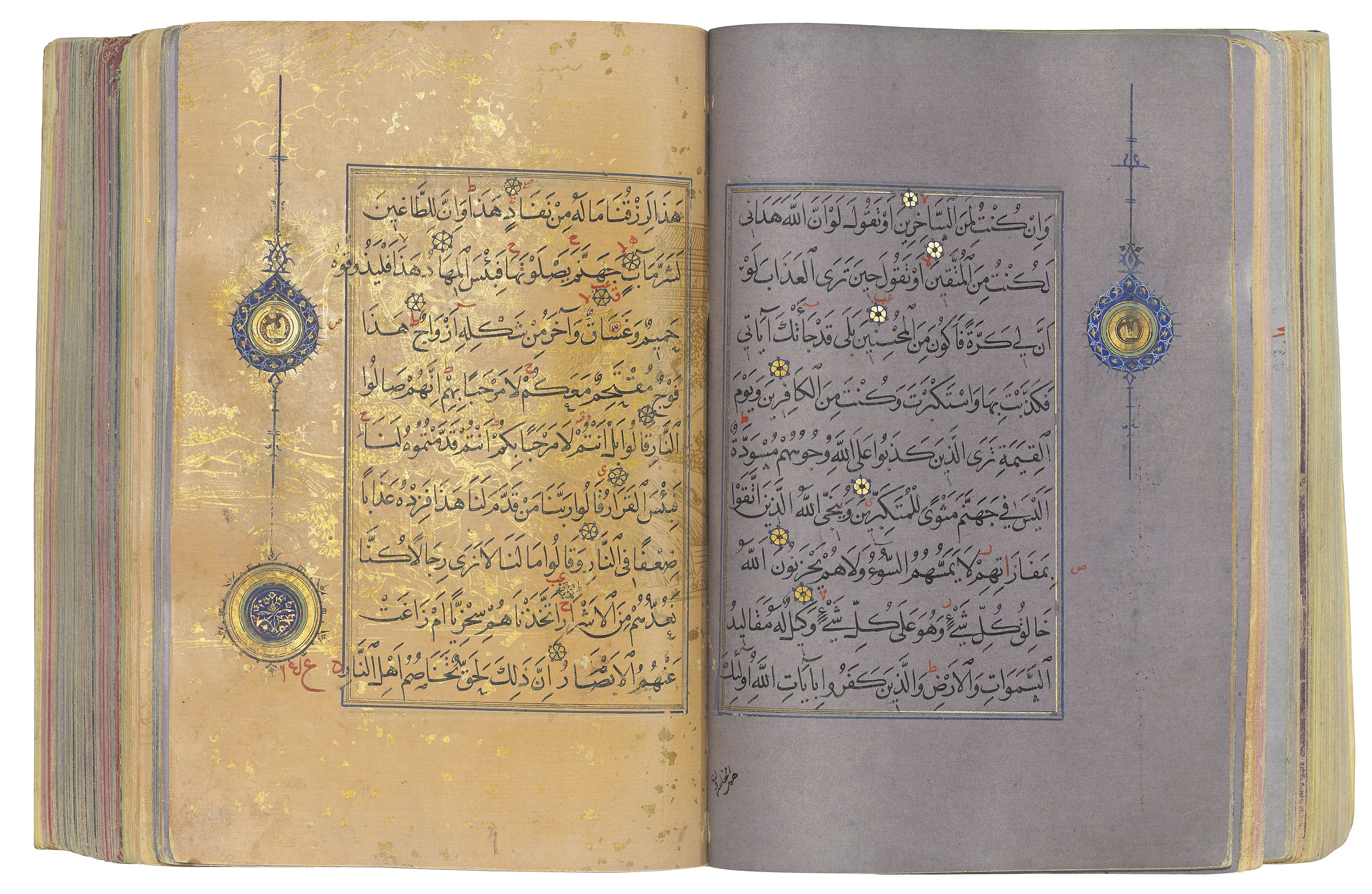

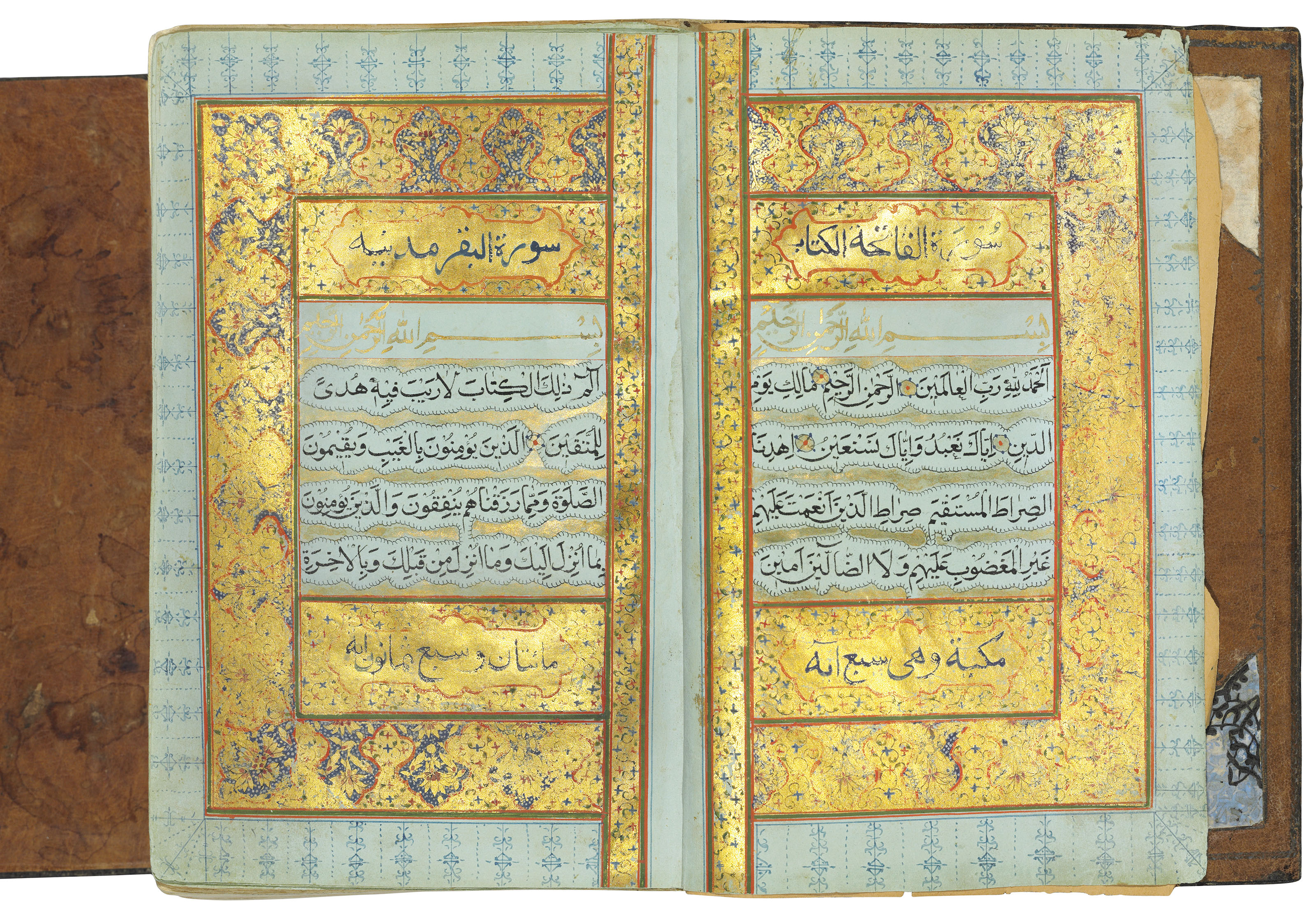

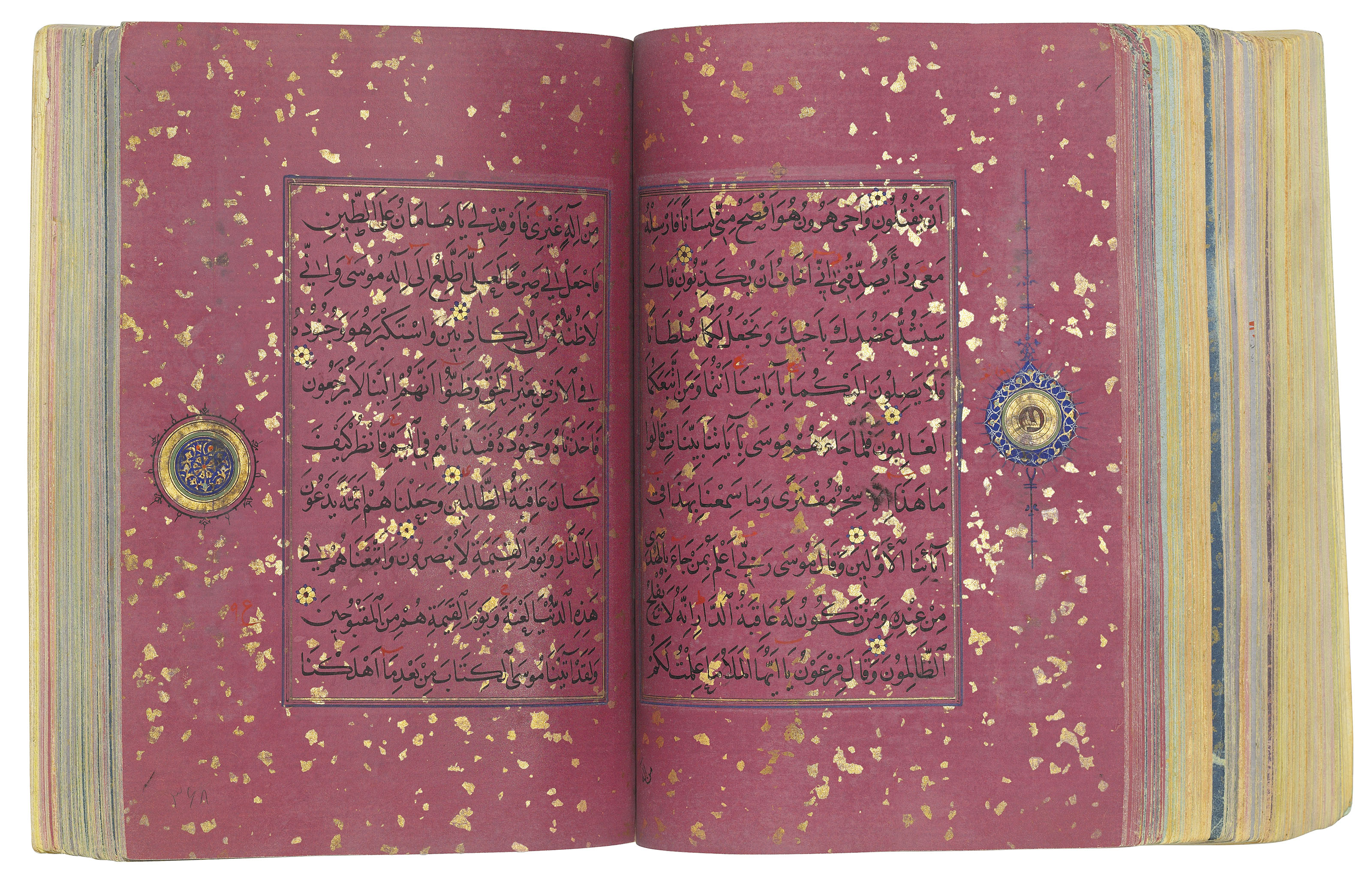

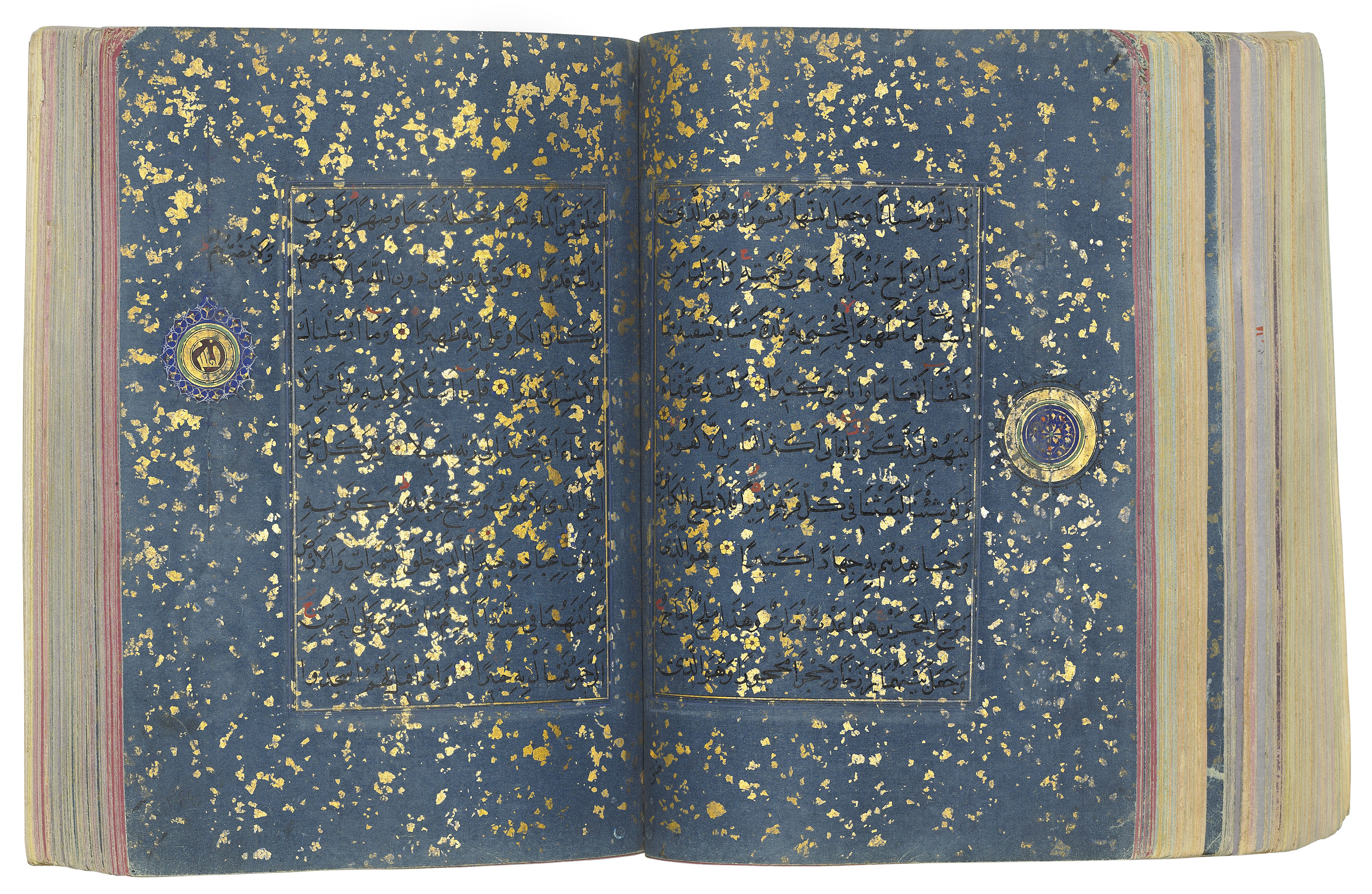
