= Ruqʿah script =

Arabic script variety used in handwriting

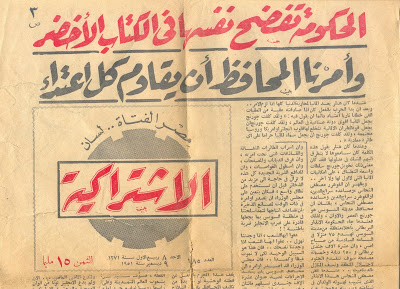
Ruqʿah as a display typeface: A 1951 edition of the Young Egypt Party journal Al-Ishtirakiyya. Ruqʿah is used for the headlines, Naskh for body text.

Ruqʿah (Arabic: رُقعة [ˈrʊqʕæ]) or Riqʿah (رِقعة [ˈrɪqʕæ]) is a writing style of Arabic script intended for the rapid production of texts. It is a relatively simple and plain style, used for everyday writing and often used for signs. The Ottoman calligraphers Mumtaz Efendi (1810–1872) and Mustafa Izzet Efendi (1801–1876) are credited with standardizing the writing style which had existed in slightly different styles as everyday handwriting.

It is not to be confused with the much older reqāʿ (رِقَاع) style.

== Description and usage ==
Ruqʿah is the most common type of handwriting in the Arabic script. It is known for its clipped letters composed of short, straight lines and simple curves, as well as its straight and even lines of text. It was probably derived from the Thuluth and Naskh styles.

Unlike other types of calligraphy, ruqʿah is not considered an art form. Instead, it is a functional style of writing that is quick to write and easy to read. Every literate Ottoman was expected to be able to use the ruqʿah.

The demonstration below is not typical since it uses full vowels, which are rarely used in handwriting:

If one of the ruqʿah style fonts is installed, the following text should appear as the above image sample:

خَيْر للمَرء أن يَمُوتَ فِى سَبِيل فِكرَتِه مِنْ أنْ يَعِيشَ طُولَ الدَهْرِ جَبَانًا عَن نِصْرةِ وَطَنِه

The same text without a ruqʿah style font (typically naskh):

خَيْر للمَرء أن يَمُوتَ فِى سَبِيل فِكرَتِه مِنْ أنْ يَعِيشَ طُولَ الدَهْرِ جَبَانًا عَن نِصْرةِ وَطَنِه

== Gallery ==
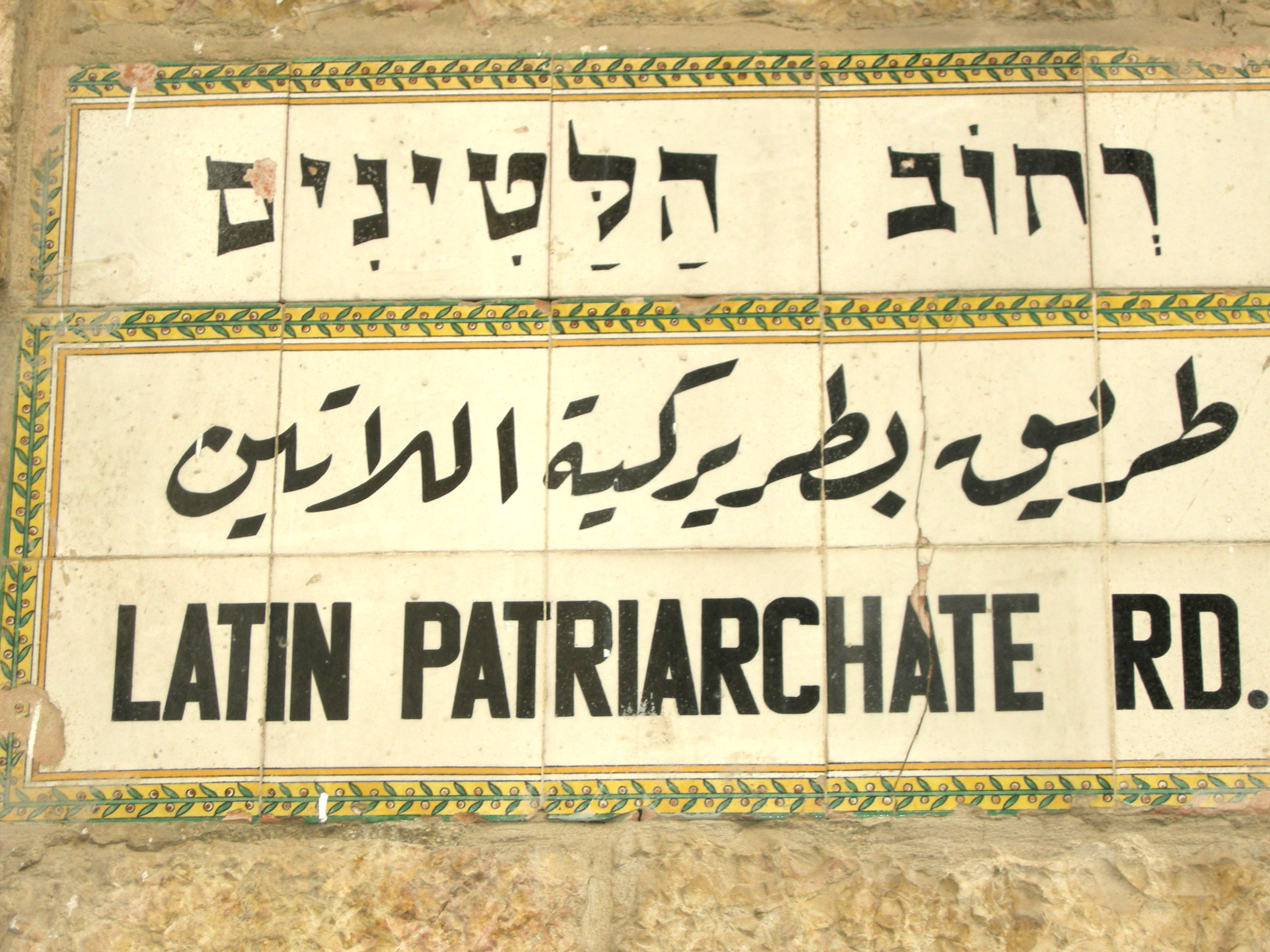
Street sign in Jerusalem (Old City)

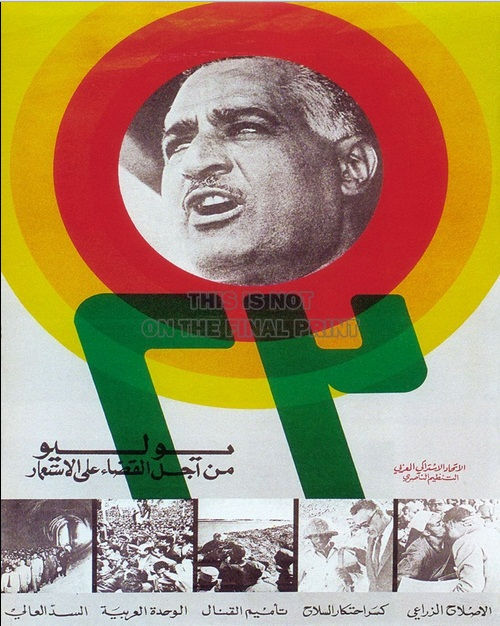
The numerals 23 appear in Ruqʿah style differently from Naskh (٢٣).

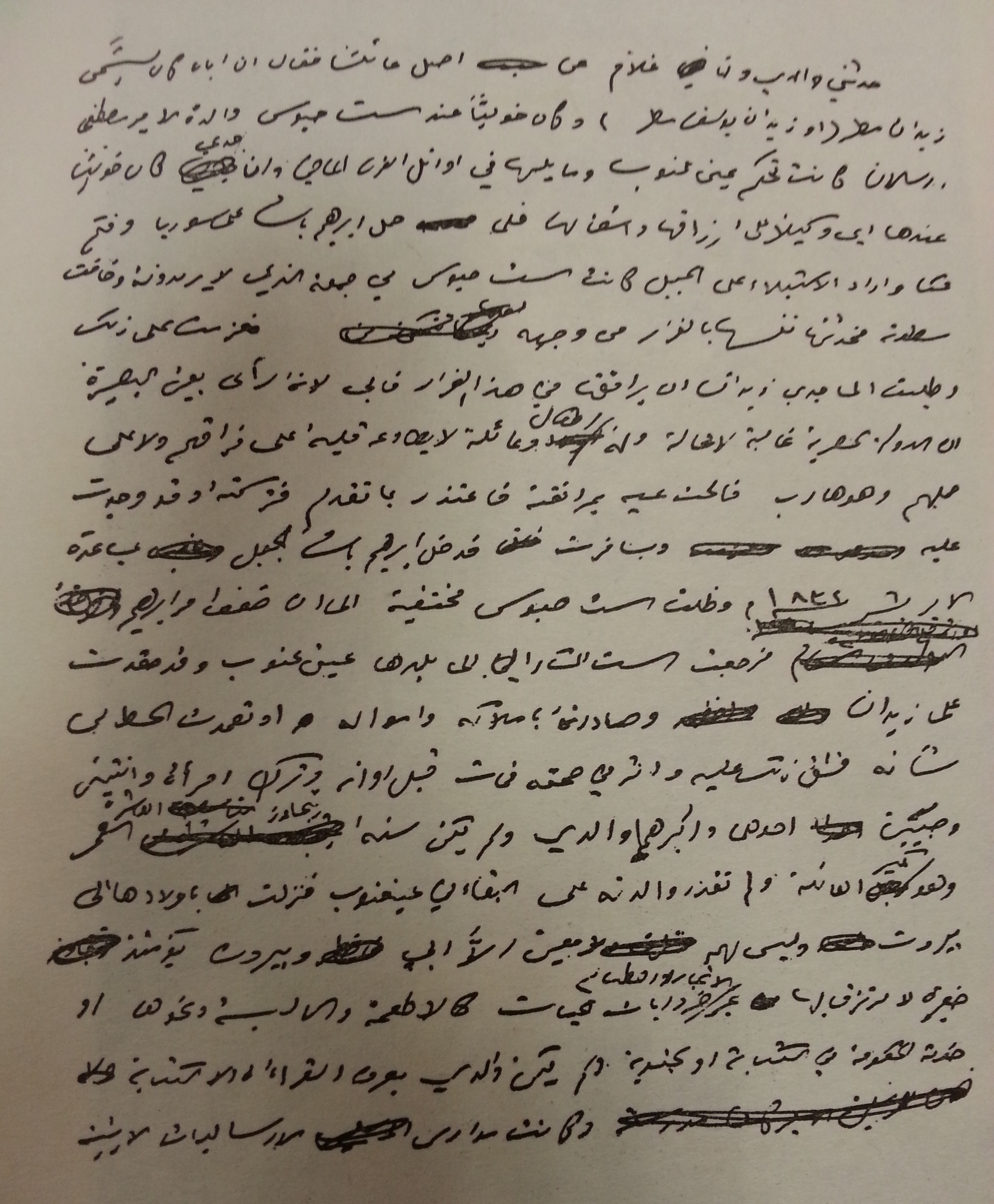
A letter hand written by Jurji Zaydan

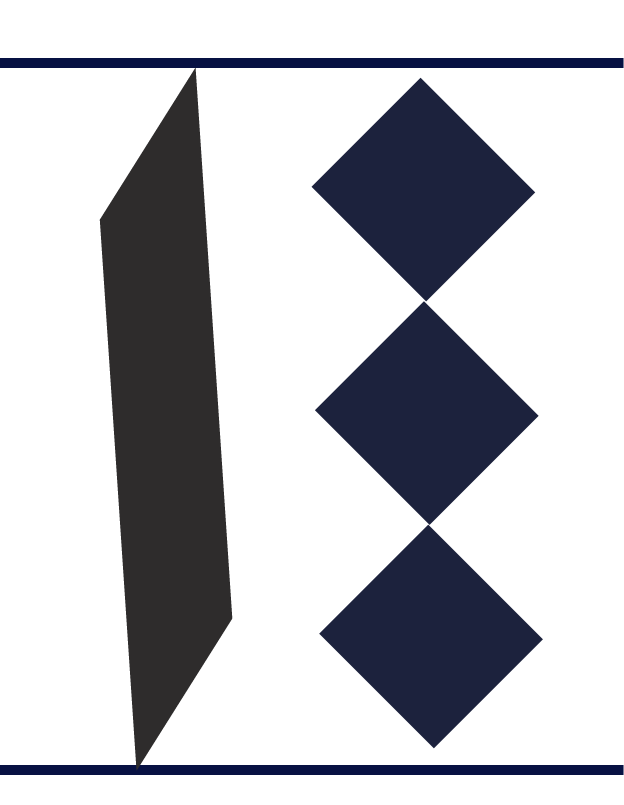
Height of the letter Alif

== Typefaces ==
Examples of modern digital typefaces rendering Arabic text in this style, are:

- Aref Ruqaa by Abdullah Aref
- Rakkas by Zeynep Akay
- Waseem on iOS
- B Arabic Style by Borna Rayaneh
- Layla Ruqaa by Mohammed Isam

== See also ==
- Diwani
- Naskh (script)
- Nastaʿlīq script
- Taʿlīq script
- Cursive
- Handwriting
