= Taliq script =

Script style in Persian calligraphy

Taliq
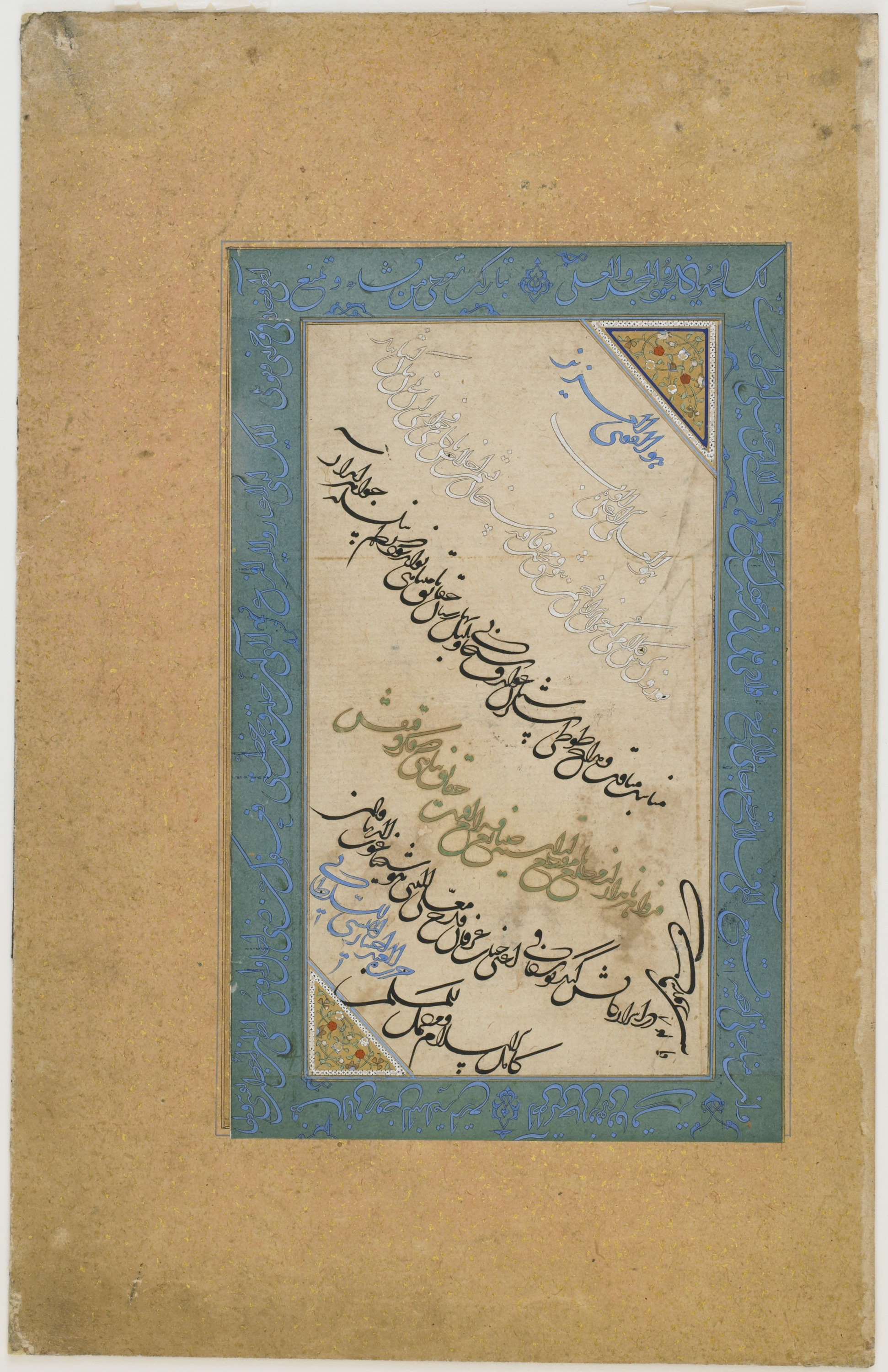
- Page of calligraphy in taliq script signed by Ekhtiyar Monshi Gonabadi. Iran, 1541-42 (948 A.H.). Freer Gallery of Art
- Script type: Abjad
- Languages: Persian

The taʿlīq (Persian: تعلیق, lit. 'hanging') script is a calligraphic hand in Islamic calligraphy typically used for official documents written in Persian. Literally meaning hanging or suspended script, it emerged in the mid‑13th century CE and was widely used, especially in chanceries of Iranian states, although from the early 16th century onward it lost ground to another hanging script, the increasingly popular nastaliq.

Taliq had a long gestation. The Persian style of writing naskh underwent gradual changes from the 11th century onward, and those changes, together with some borrowings from tawqi and riqa', resulted in the emergence of taliq script in the mid‑13th century CE. Taliq shares many peculiarities with these three scripts, "but is more stylized. It revels in curvilinear elements, extraneous loops, extreme contrasts between compression and expansion, and connected letters, all traits that make it difficult for the novice to decipher".

In taliq words and detached letters could be joined, which allowed for speedy writing and made it suitable for official correspondence. By the late thirteenth century taliq had achieved a definitive style, sometimes called taliq-i qadim (old taliq) or taliq-i asl (original taliq), "probably driven in part by the burgeoning Ilkhanid bureaucracy’s need to standardize written Persian". (see firman of Sadr al-Din Zanjani, vizier of ilkhan Gaykhatu). In order to write even faster, chancery clerks (munshi) streamlined the script by increasing the number of unorthodox ligatures and dropping the pointing on many letters. Some letters were reduced in size, while others were written with thinner strokes or in new shapes. This new style known as shikasta taliq (broken, i.e., truncated and simplified taliq) (sometimes also called khatt-i tarassol - "correspondence script") was used systematically from the end of the 14th century.

According to Safavid authors (like Dust Muhammad or Qadi Ahmad) shikasta taliq have been invented, or at least defined, by Taj al-Din Salmani, a scribe working in the court of Timur (r. 1370-1405), and perfected by ʿAbd-al-Hayy Astarabadi, chief clerk under Timur's grandson Abu Sa'id (r. 1451-1469). ʿAbd-al-Hayy developed two varieties of taliq – a more flowing style associated with the Timurids in Khurasan and a more linear and solid style associated with Aq Qoyunlu in Iraq and Azerbaijan. The biographers mention Darvish 'Abdallah Munshi as the most famous calligrapher in the Khurasan style (see letter by his hand). The most important taliq calligrapher of Safavid period was Ekhtiyar Monshi Gonabadi (d. 1582), after whom "no calligraphers dedicated themselves with the same seriousness to Ta‘liq calligraphy because the same century saw the flowering of the Nasta‘liq script".

Gholam-Hosayn Yusofi stressed that shikasta taliq "is a script devised for rapid writing and therefore one in which intertwining is allowed, that is, unjoinable letters as well as two or more words are joined together. The strokes, except in certain contexts, are predominantly round, and the pen is moved smoothly. The sizes of letters and words are not uniform, and if there is any consistency in the composition, it is very different from the neat symmetry to be seen in other scripts".

In the 15th century taliq was also used in the Ottoman Empire. Following the expansion of imperial chancery after conquest of Constantinople in 1453 Ottoman scribes began to elaborate taliq script, developing the distinctive Ottoman style known as divani. Taliq is also generally used as the name for the nastaliq script in the Turkish language and often in the Arabic language. Traditionally taliq was considered to be the basis of the nastaliq, but more recent research derive this script from the naskh alone.

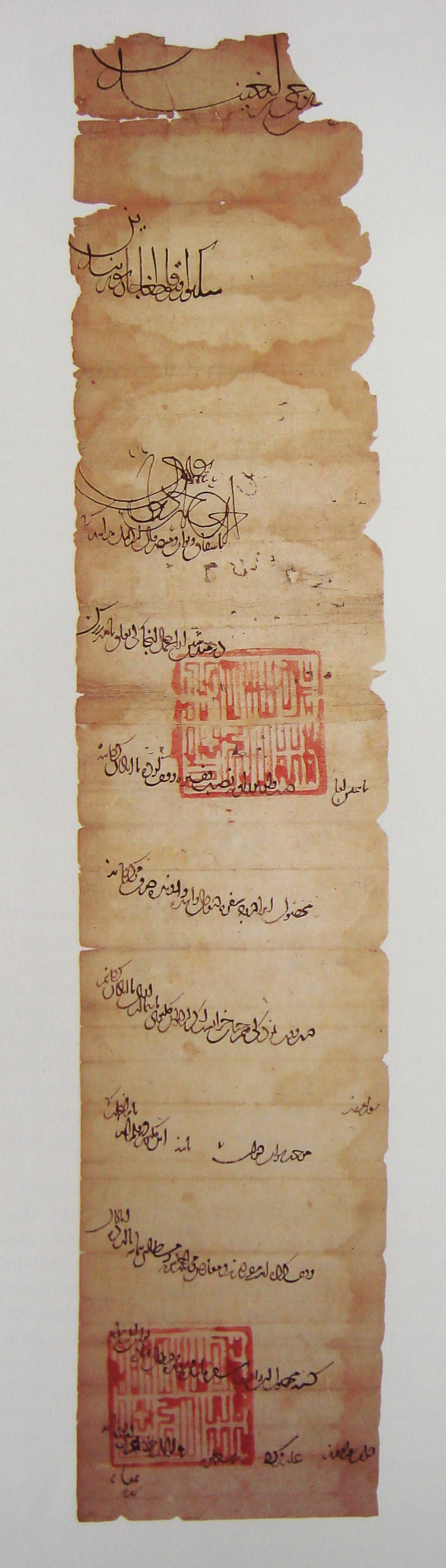
Firman of Sadr al-Din Zanjani, vizier of ilkhan Gaykhatu, dated Jumada II 692/June 1292. Art and History Collection on loan to the Arthur M. Sackler Gallery

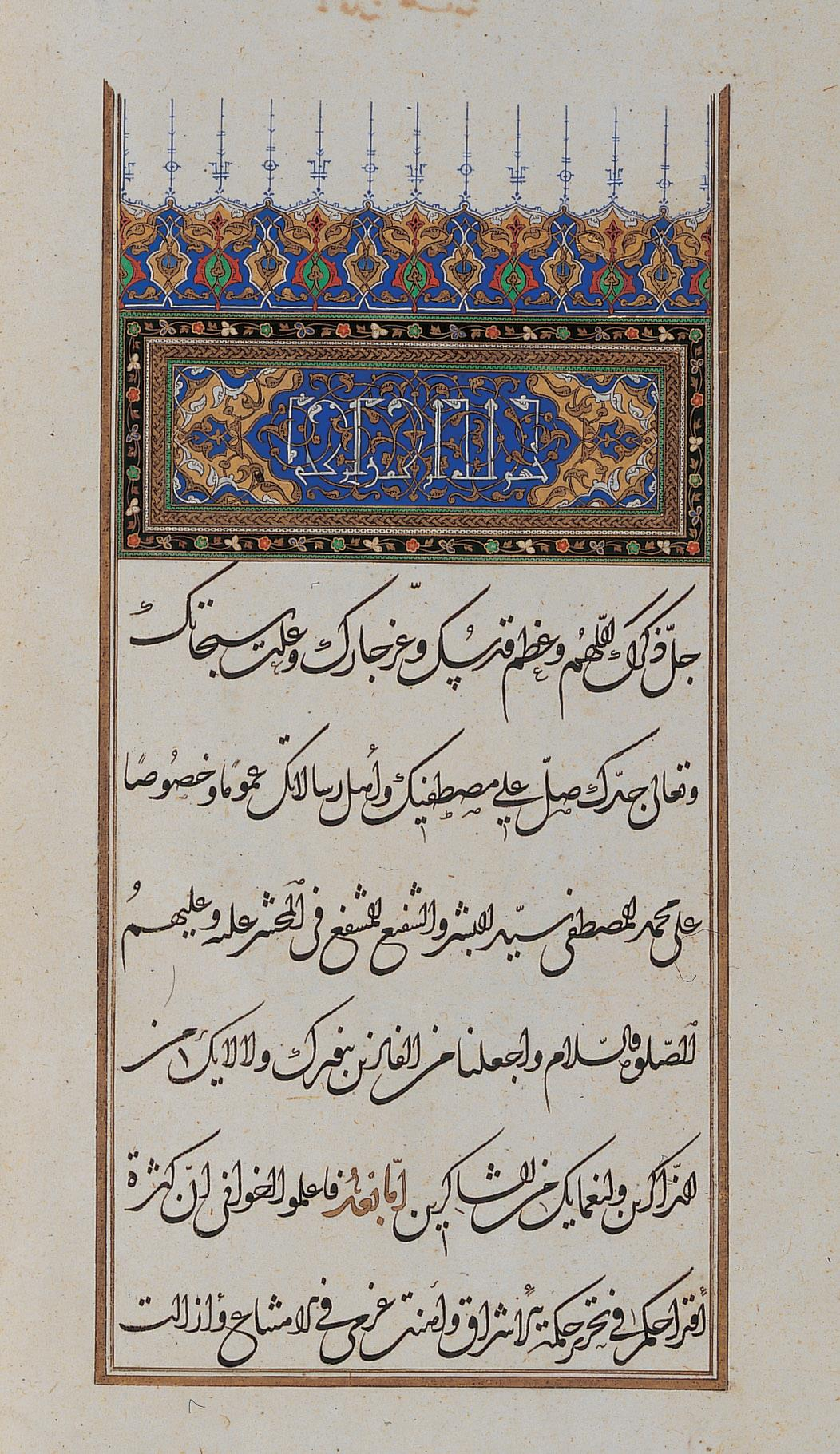
Opening page from the manuscript of Hikmat al-ʿIshraq transcribed by Sayyid Muhammad Munshi for the library of sultan Mehmed II. Istanbul, dated 882 AH (1477-8 CE). Topkapı Palace Museum

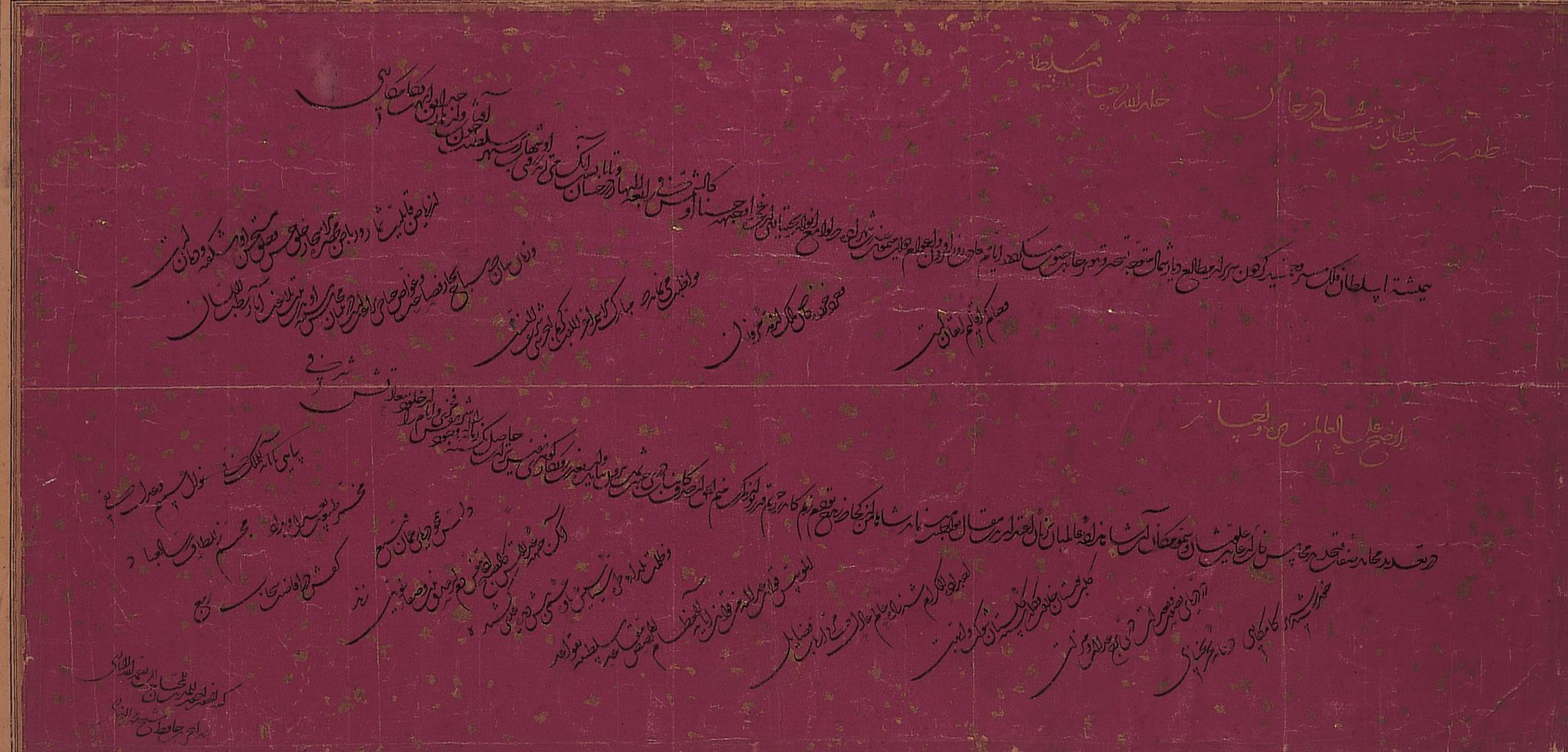
Encomium to the sultan Yaʿqub Aqqoyunlu (r. 1478-1490), copied in shikasta taliq by ʿAbd al- Hayy ibn Hafiz Shaykh Muhammad al-Bukhari. Topkapı Palace Museum

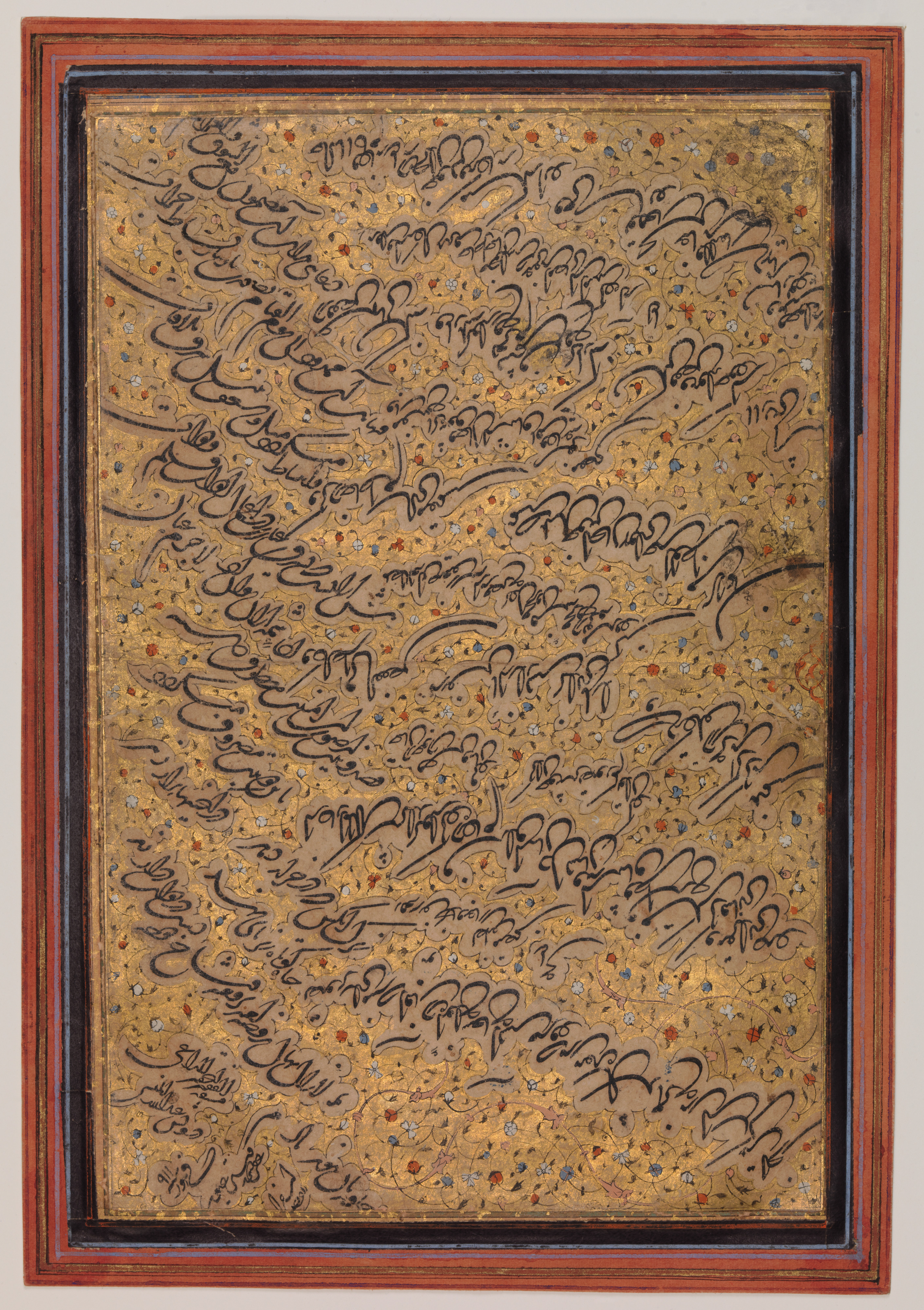
Letter in taliq by Darvish 'Abdallah Munshi. Iran, A.H. 911 (1505–6 CE). Metropolitan Museum of Art

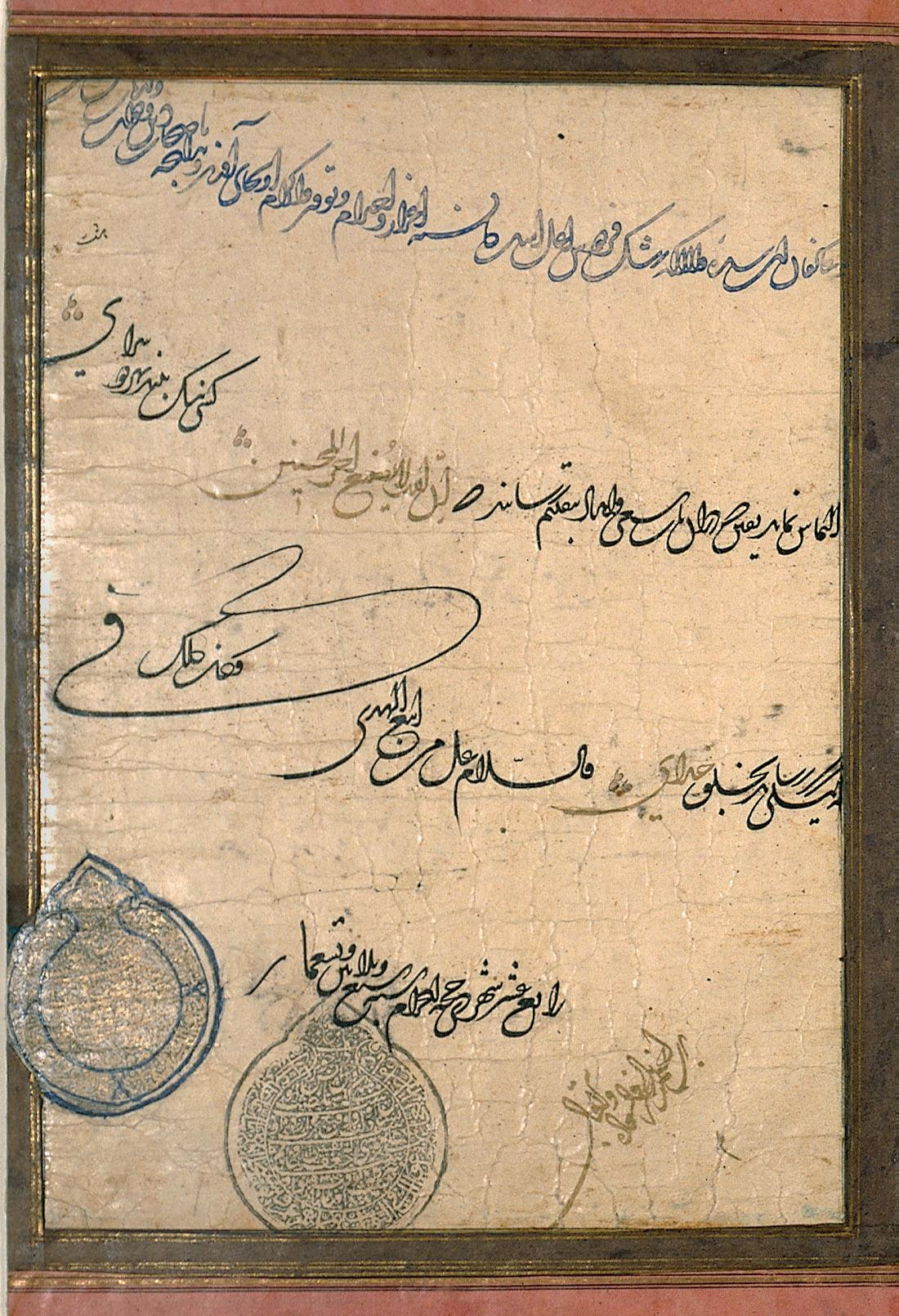
Closing page from a ziyaratnama (letter of recommendation) issued by the shrine of Imam Reza at Mashhad on 14 Dhu'l Hijja 944/5 July 1533. Letter recommend Darvish Khidr Shah as a worthy person who had performed the pilgrimage to Mashhad. British Museum

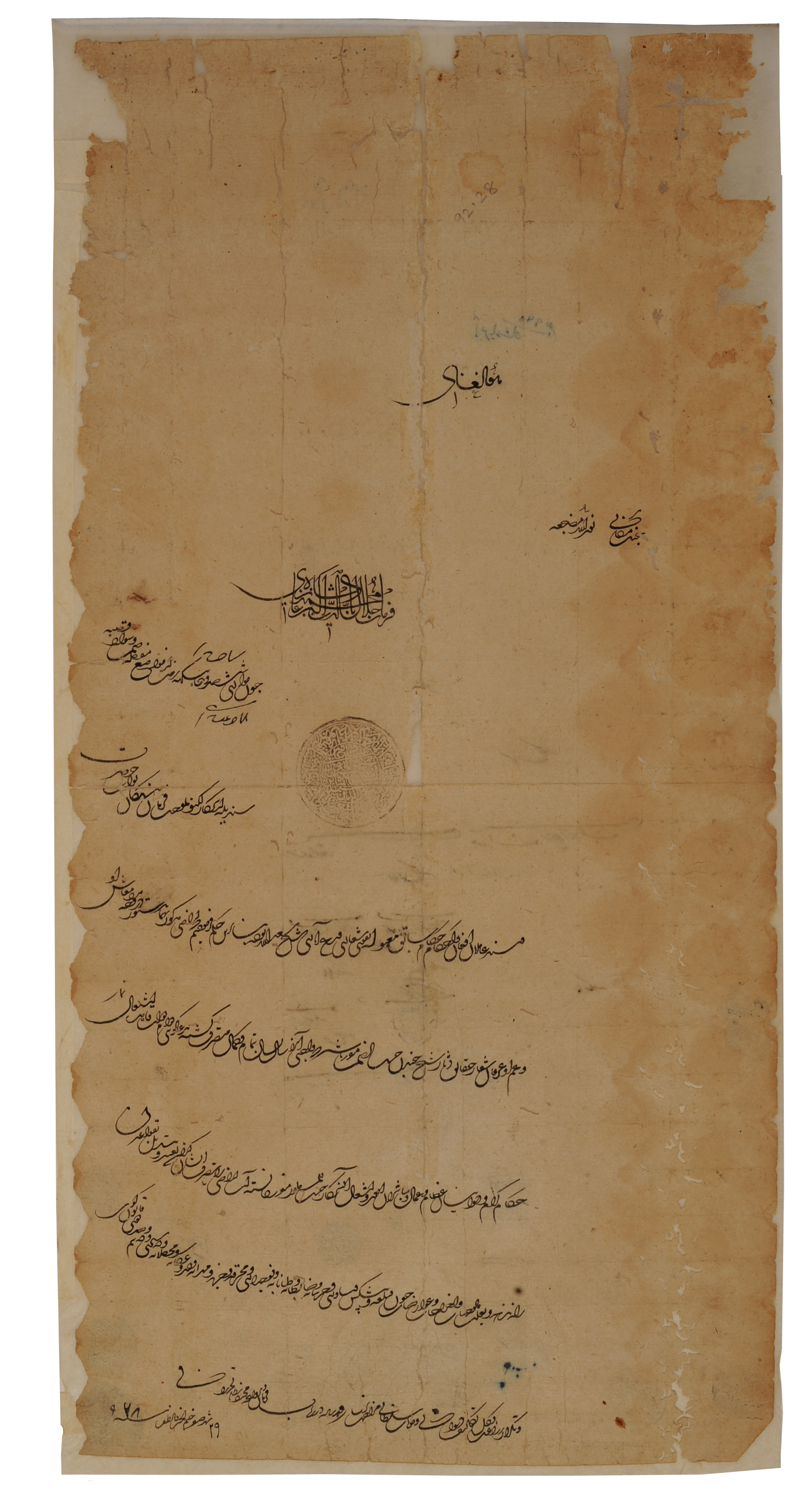
Firman of Mughal Emperor Akbar, dated 1560 CE. National Museum of India

== Bibliography ==
- Blair, Sheila (2008). Islamic Calligraphy. Edinburgh University Press. ISBN 978-0748612123.
