= Alaeddin Tabrizi =

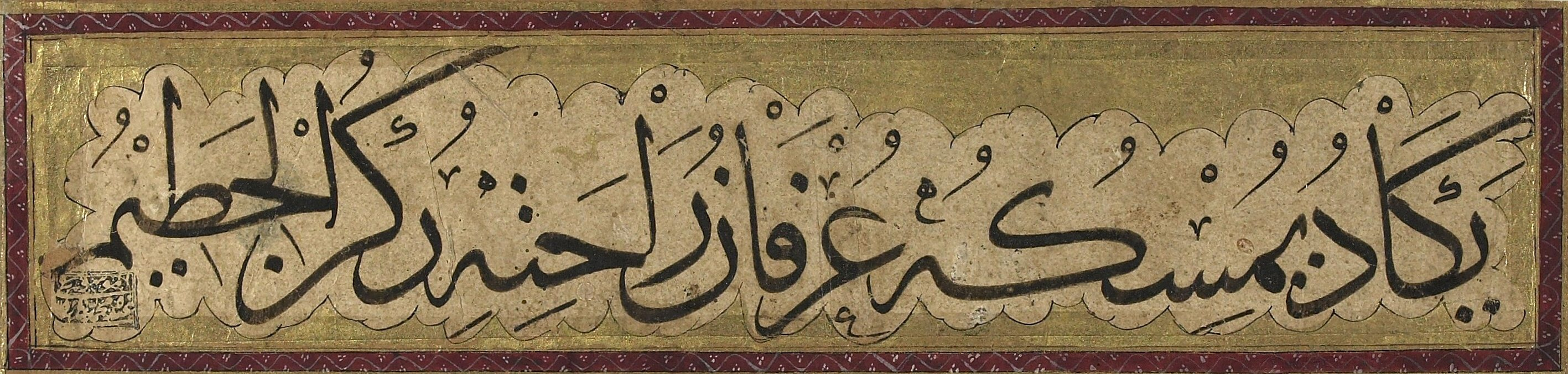
Calligraphic panel with prayer in thuluth, which reads "the grasping of God brings the knowledge of His comfort". The later inscription attributed this work to Alaeddin Tabrizi. (Library of Congress)

Alaeddin Tabrizi or Ala'al-Din Tabrizi (Persian: علاءالدین تبریزی) was a royal master calligrapher who was active during the reign of the Safavid ruler Shah Tahmasp (r. 1524–76), for whom he executed firman (Persian: فرمان, lit. 'royal decrees'). He executed a number of inscriptions placed on buildings in the cities Tabriz, Qazvin, and Karbala.

== References and Notes ==
- Huart (1972): 103
- Qadi Ahmad (1959): 79
- Safwat (1996): 84–88 and Cat. No. 43, and 134–135, Cat. No. 65
