= Tawqi =

Calligraphic variety of the Arabic script

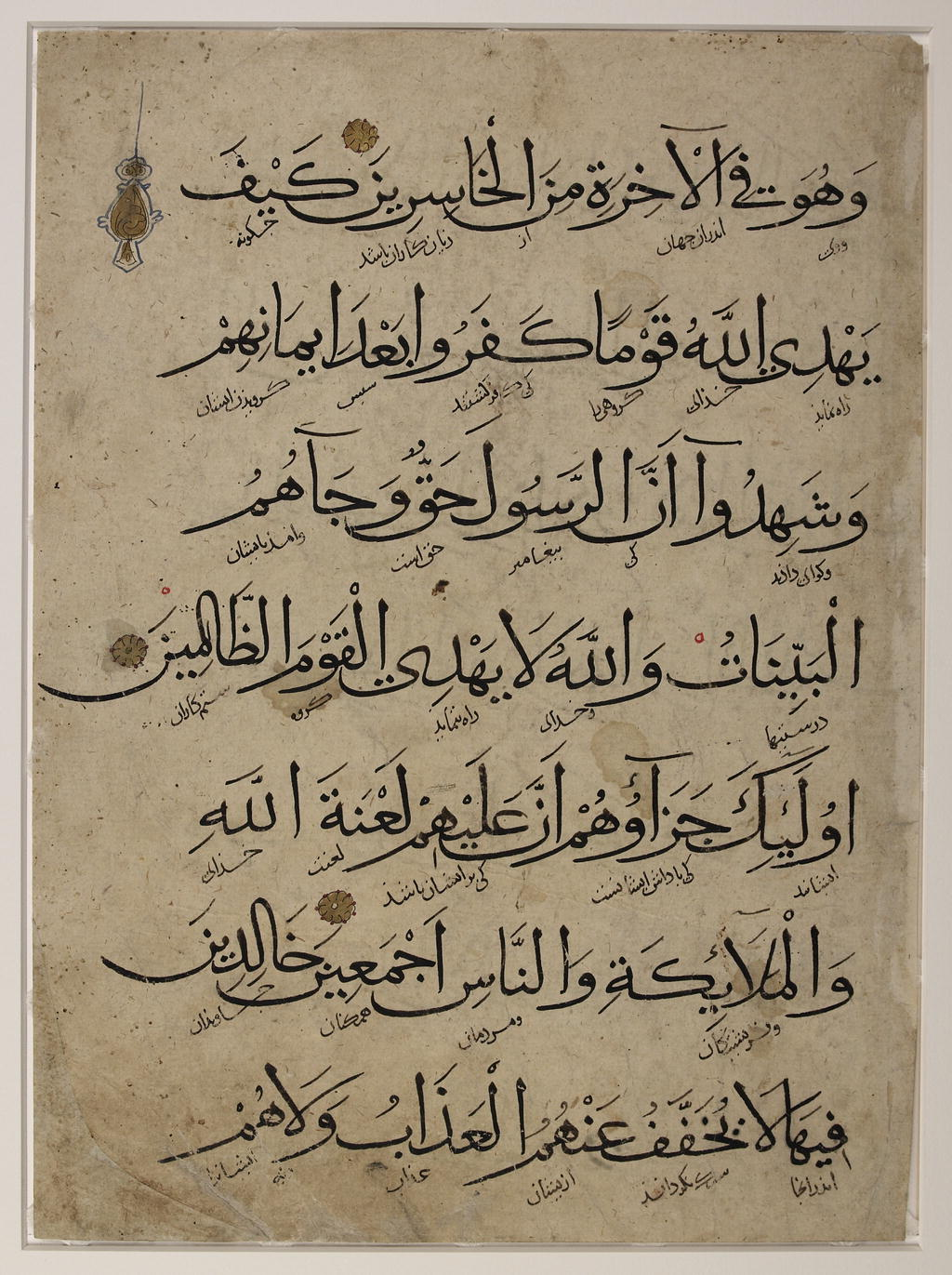
Qur'an verse 3:85-88 written in tawqi‘ with Persian annotations in naskh (14th century)

Tawqi‘ (Arabic: التوقيع, romanized: al-tawqī‘) is a calligraphic variety of the Arabic script. It is a modified and smaller version of the thuluth script. Both scripts were developed by Ibn Muqlah. The tawqi‘ script was further refined by Ibn al-Bawwab.

It was mostly employed in official state papers and documents in the Ottoman Empire, where the script was known as tevki.
