= Naskh (script) =

Small, rounded script of Islamic calligraphy

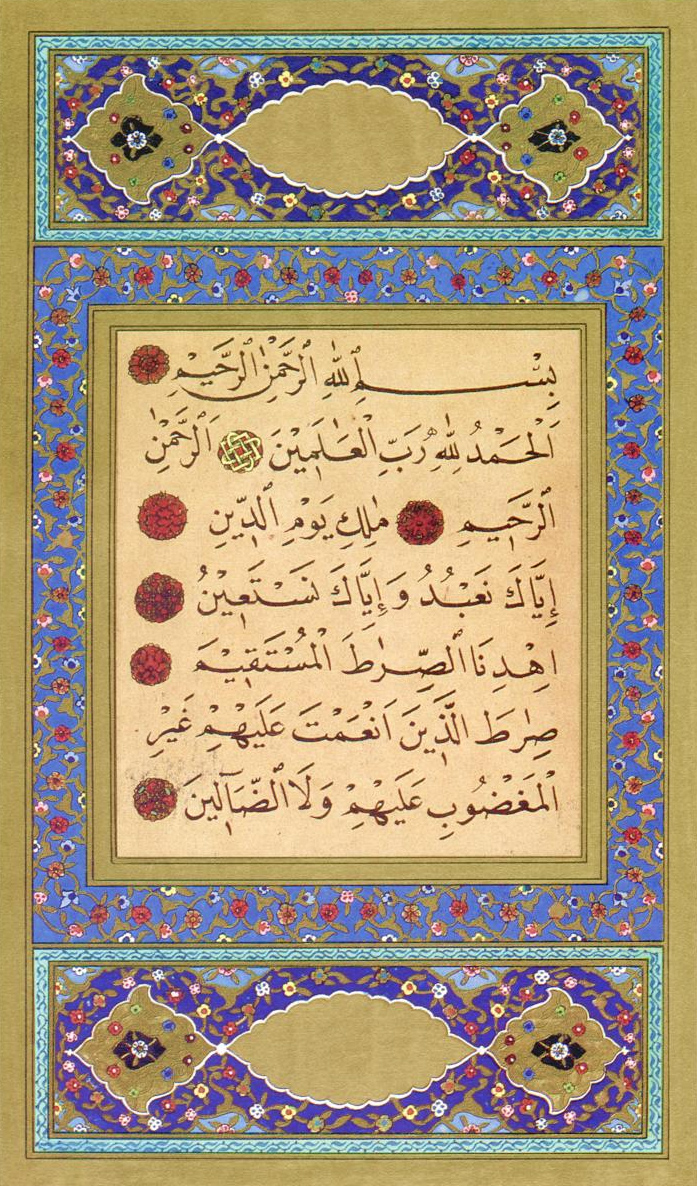
Al-Fatihah surah written in Naskh script

Naskh (Note: Arabic: [næsx], قلم النسخ qalam al-naskh, from the verb نَسَخَ, nasakha, 'to copy', from the root n-s-kh (ن-س-خ)) is a small, round script of Islamic calligraphy. Naskh is one of the first scripts of Islamic calligraphy to develop, commonly used in writing administrative documents and for transcribing books, including the Qur’an, because of its easy legibility.

In his 1617 Grammatica Arabica, Thomas van Erpe defined naskhī characters as the "noblest and true writing style".

== Origin ==
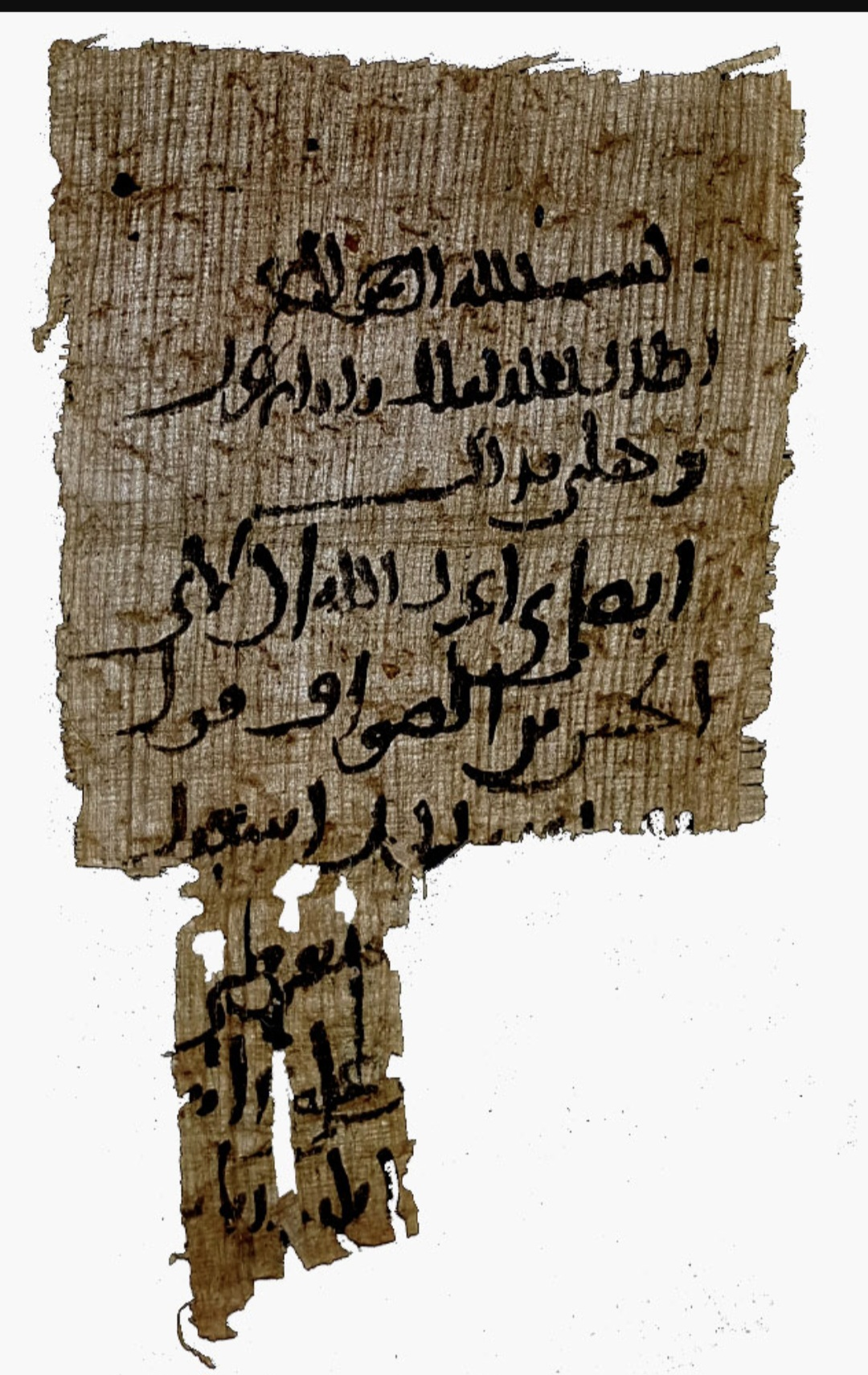
This is a piece of papyrus written in Qara script (Naskh) in black ink. It is written in Arabic (Classical) in the 8th century AD.

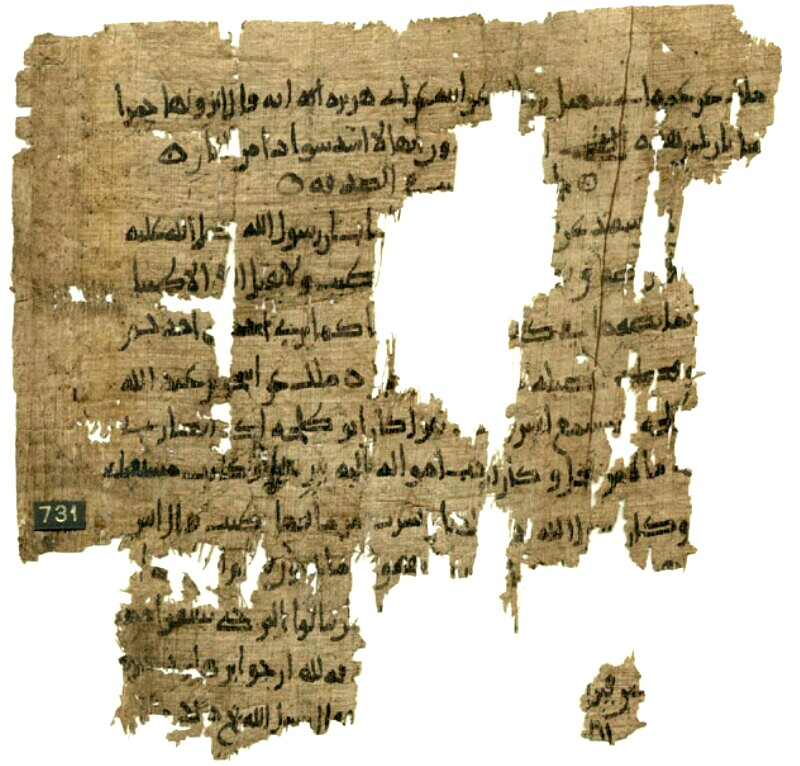
PERF No. 731, the earliest manuscript of Mālik's Muwaṭṭaʾ, dated to his own time. Recto (left) has the contents of Bāb al-Targib fī-Sadaqah, Manuscript of Malik's Muwatta in soft, flowing Naskh scriptIn the second century AH

The Naskh style of writing can be found as early as within the first century of the Islamic calendar. It was established at this time by order of Abd al-Malik ibn Marwan due to the presence of defects in the Kufic script.

Ibn Muqla is credited with standardizing the "Six Pens" of Islamic calligraphy, also including thuluth, tawqi’, riqaaʿ, muhaqqaq, and rayhani. These are known as "the proportioned scripts" (al-khatt al-mansub) or "the six scripts" (al-aqlam al-sitta).

Kufic is commonly believed to predate naskh, but historians have traced the two scripts as coexisting long before their codification by Ibn Muqla, as the two served different purposes. Kufic was used primarily in decoration, while Naskh served for everyday scribal use. The Naskh script is believed to have existed since the first century of the Islamic calendar.

== Description ==
The alif is written as a straight stroke, bending to the lower left. Naskh differentiates various sounds through the use of diacritical points, in the form of 1–3 dots above or below the letter, which makes the script more easily legible. Naskh uses a horizontal base line; in situations where one character starts within the tail of the preceding letter, the base line is broken and raised. In sixteenth-century Constantinople, Şeyh Hamdullah (1429–1520) redesigned the structure of naskh, along with the other "Six Pens", in order to make the script appear more precise and less heavy.

== Use ==
Naskh was historically used heavily in the transcription of books and in administrative courtly documents.

Naskh allowed for the development of decorative elements into more supple, rounded designs, away from the common use of squared Kufic in decoration. Naskh's use in architecture first began in the tenth century and had been adopted in many Muslim countries by the eleventh century.

The script is what is normally used electronically and as the default typeface. Examples on typefaces in naskh on Windows (W), iOS (M), Linux (L), and Google Fonts (G):

Simple types with nearly no complicated glyphs

- Arial^{(W/M)} (Arabic Transparent,^{(W)} Times New Roman,^{(W/M)} Arial Arabic)
- Simplified Arabic^{(W)}
- Scheherazade New^{(G)}
- Courier New^{(W/M)} (monospace)
- Cascadia Mono^{(G)} (monospace)
- Noto Naskh Arabic^{(G)}
- SF Arabic^{(M)}
- Layla Basic Arabic

With some glyphs shared partly with ruqaa style

- Damascus^{(M)}
- KacstOne^{(L)}
- Arabic Typesetting^{(W)}
- Al Bayan^{(M)}
- DecoType Naskh^{(M)}
- Baghdad^{(M)}
- Geeza Pro^{(M)}
- Nadeem^{(M)}
- Yakout
- Sakkal Majalla^{(W)}
- Traditional Arabic^{(W)}
- Amiri^{(G)}

Amiri is inspired by the Bulaq Press-inspired Amiri typeface or Monotype Imaging's Bustani font.

== Gallery ==
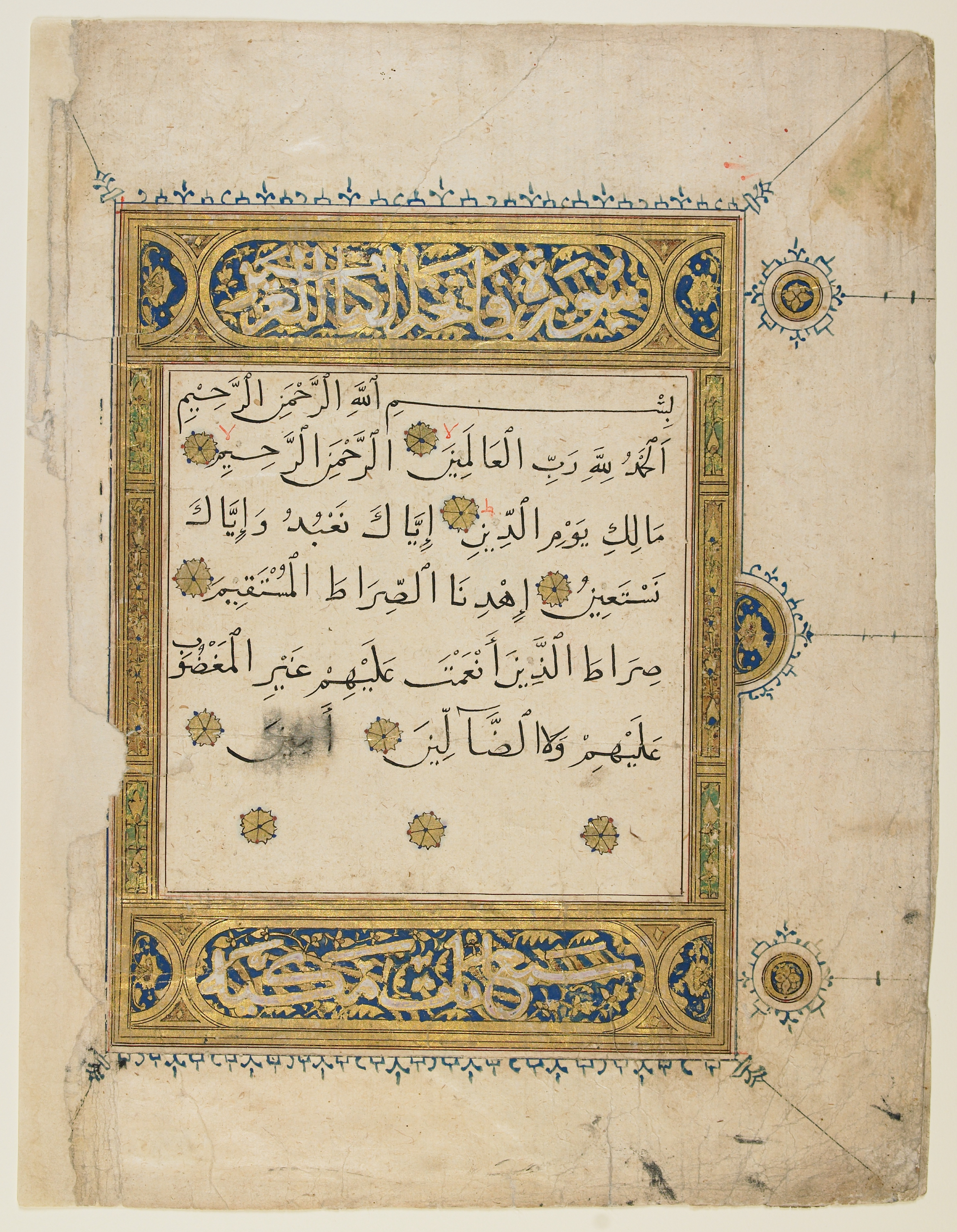
14th- or 15th-century Quran with body text in naskh

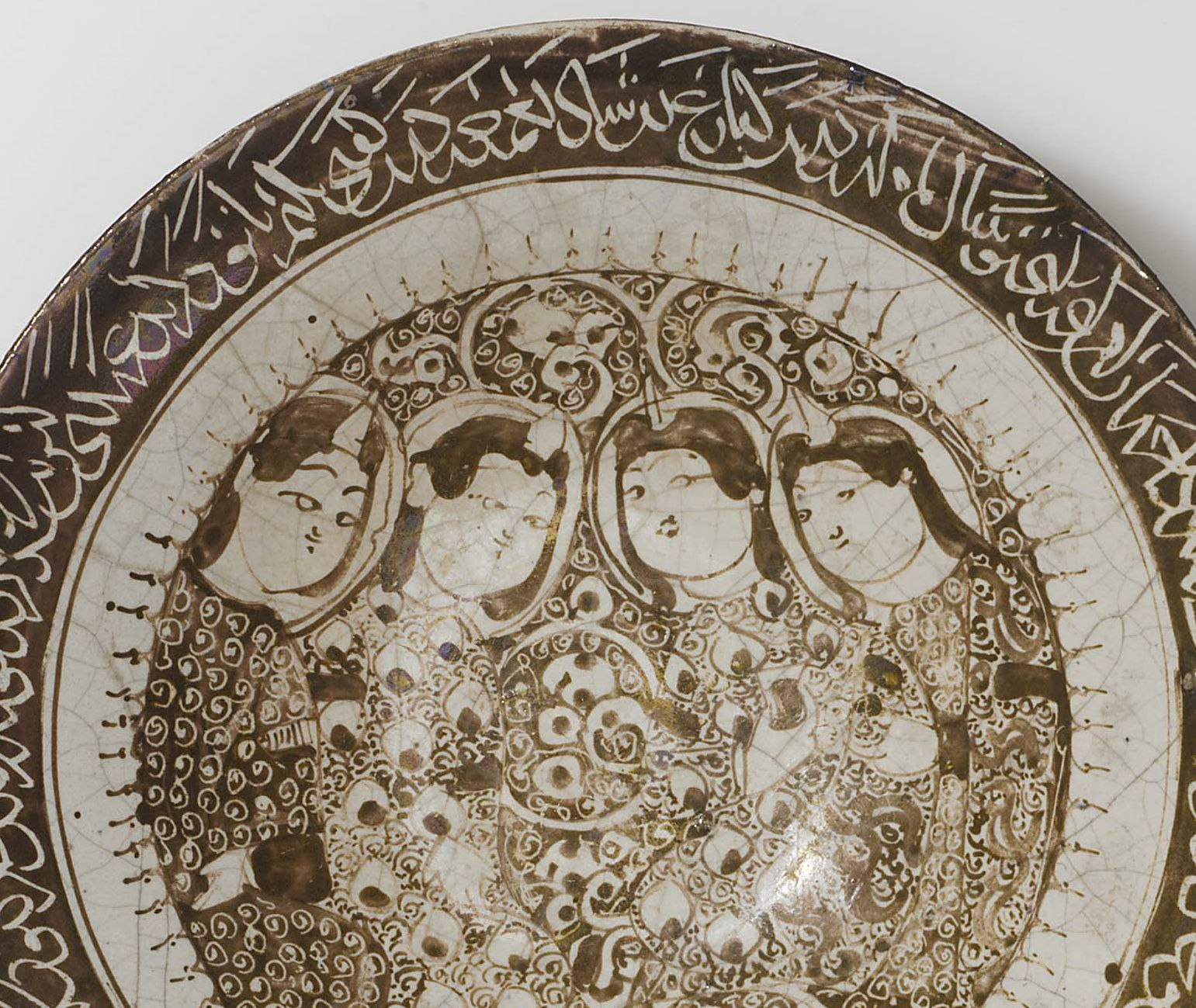
Stonepaste dish from 13th-century Iran with a poem in naskh around the rim.

Basmala in naskh.

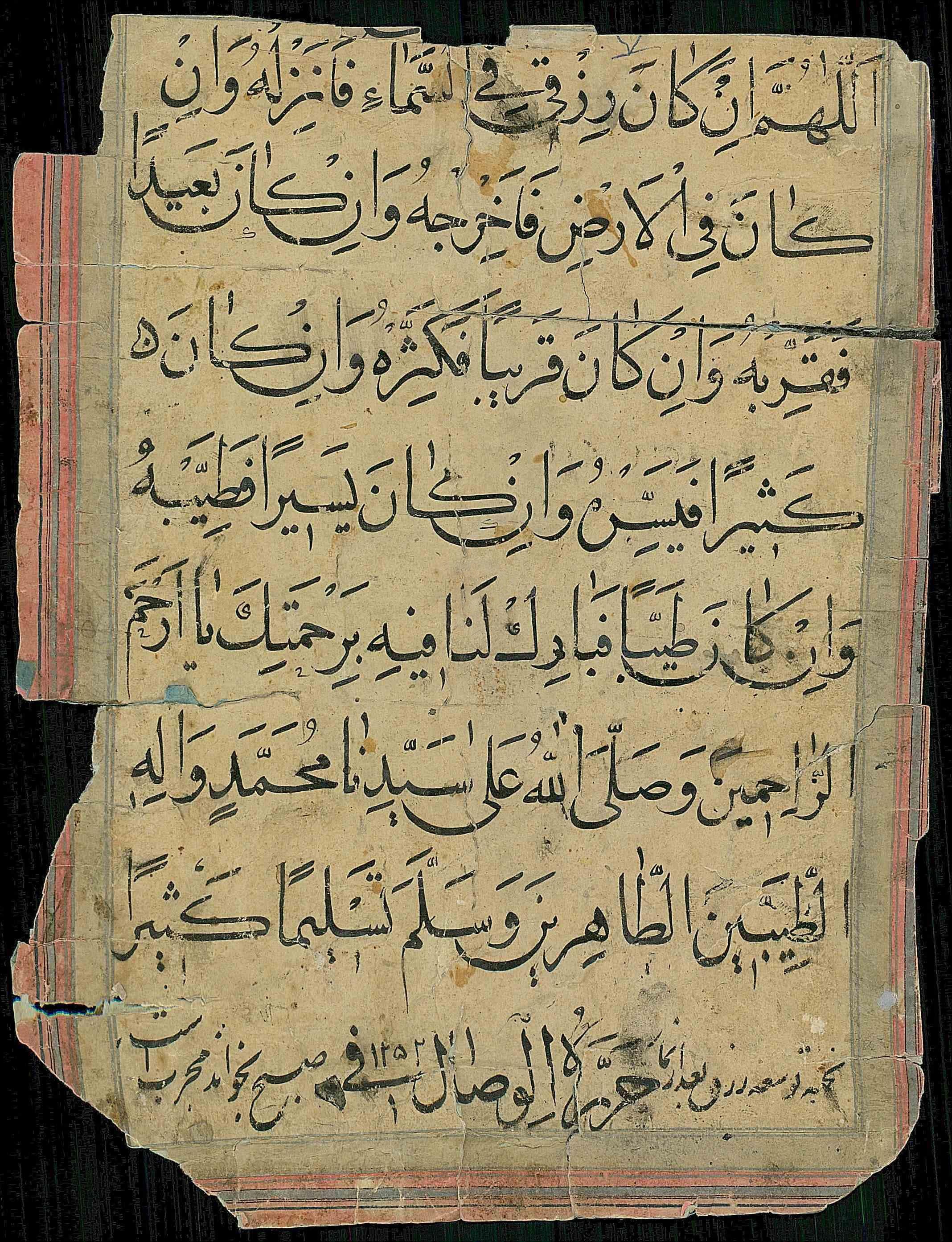
Prayer in naskh, 1252 AH, Vesal-i Shirazi, National Library of Iran.

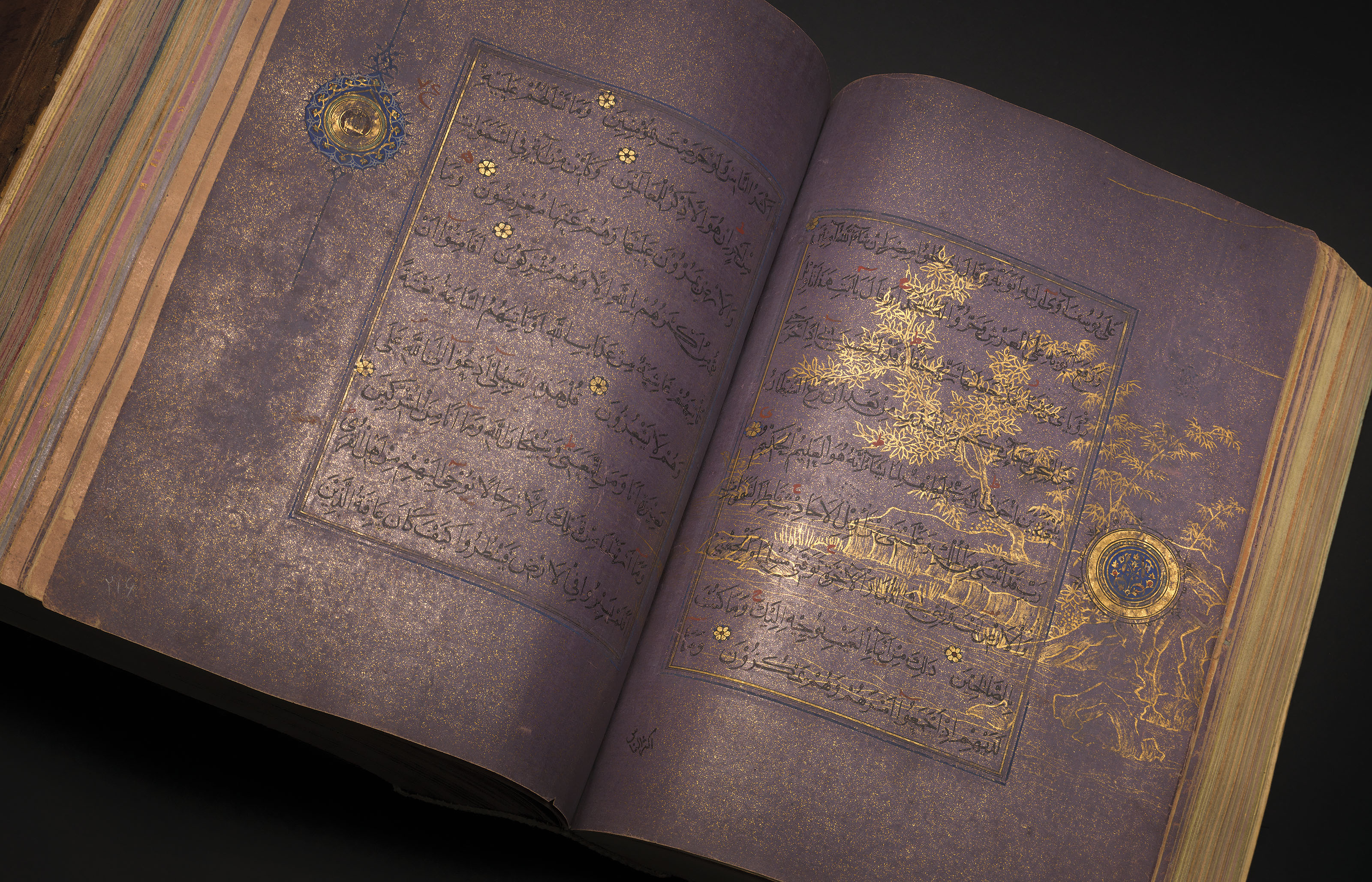
The Timurid Quran manuscript, c. 15th-century, written in naskh.

== See also ==
- Ruqʿah (the cursive Arabic handwriting)
- Nastaliq
- Arabic, Urdu, other Arabic keyboard layouts
- National Language Authority
- Taʿlīq script
