= Reqā' =

Script of Arabic calligraphy

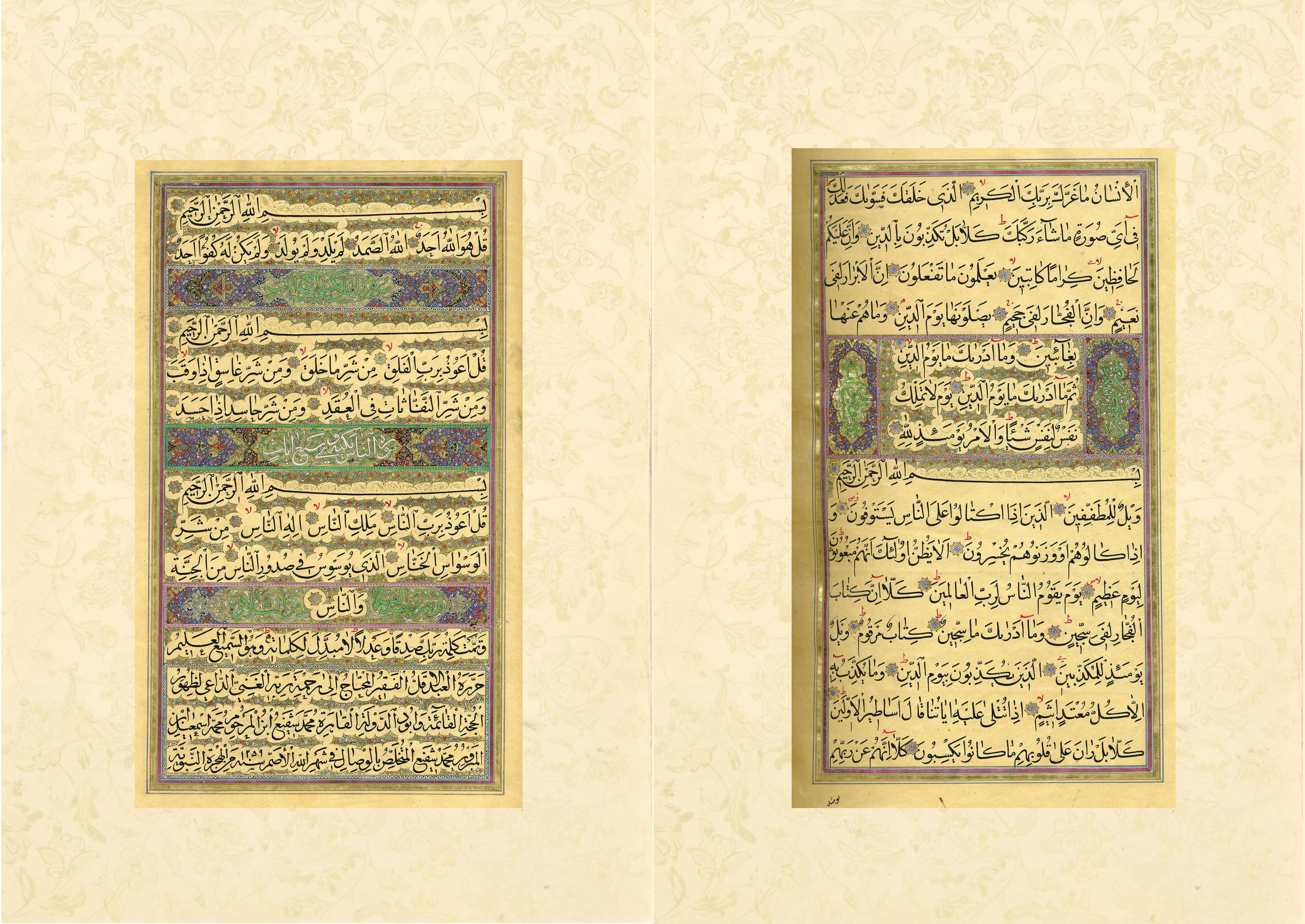
Folio from the Quran copied by Vesal Shirazi. This has parts written in Reqāʿ and Naskh

Reqāʿ (Arabic: رِقَاع, romanized: Riqāʿ) is one of the six scripts of Arabic calligraphy used primarily for letters, edicts, or manuscripts. Reqa' was used for private correspondence on small papers or for nonreligious books and texts. Ibn al-Nadim mentioned in Al-Fihrist that the inventor of Reqaʿ was al-Fadl ibn Sahl. This script was one of the most popular scripts in the Ottoman Empire. Reqaʿ was gradually simplified by other calligraphers, and was changed into a form called Ruqʿah (رُقعة) or Riqʿah (رِقعة), which is now the most common handwriting script in the Arab world.
