= Thuluth =

Script variety of Arabic calligraphy

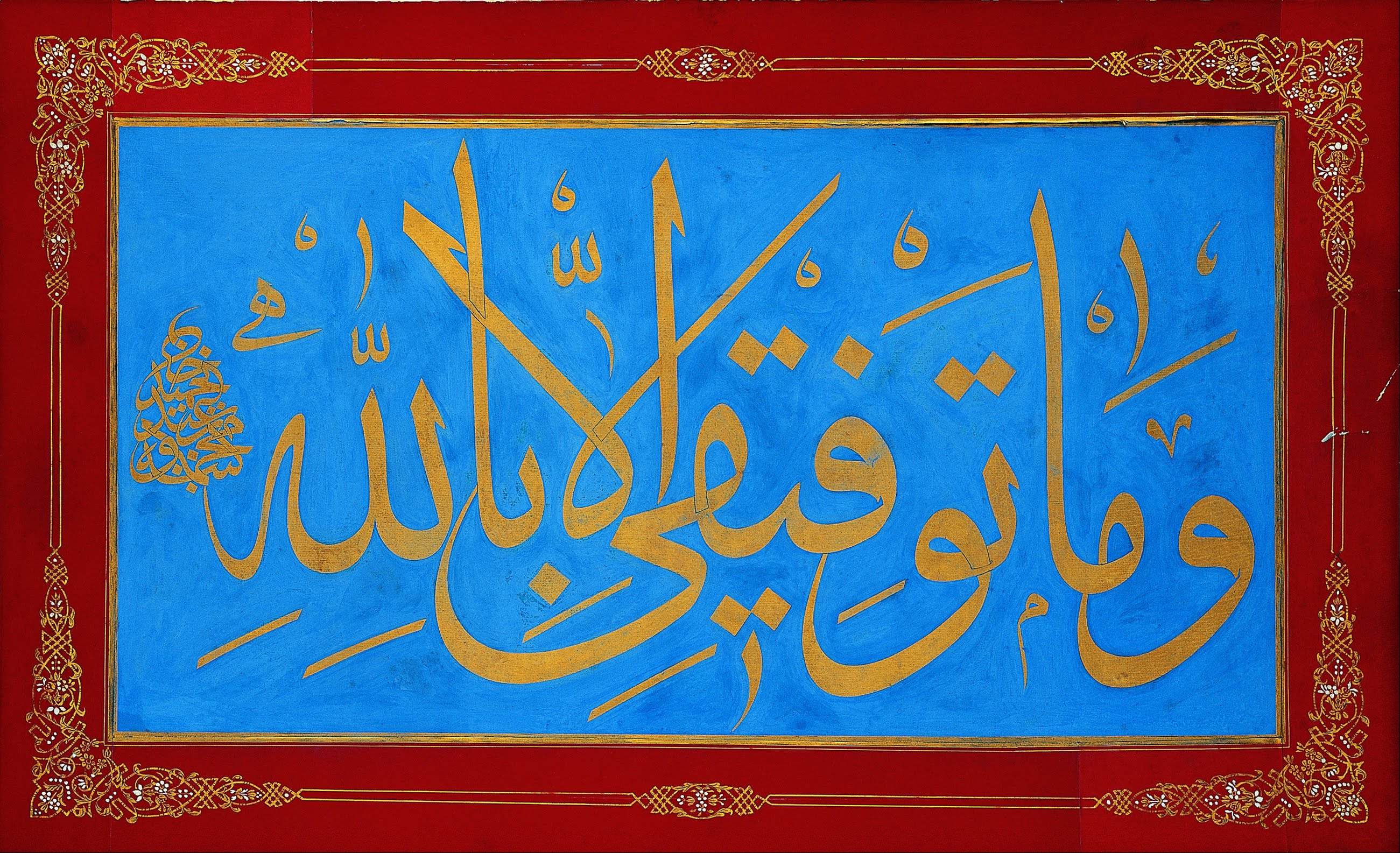
Quran 11:88 in the Thuluth scripture, calligraphed and signed by Mahmud II

Thuluth (Arabic: ثُلُث, Thuluth or Arabic: خَطُّ الثُّلُثِ, Khaṭṭu th-Thuluthi; Persian: ثلث, Sols; Turkish: Sülüs, from thuluth "one-third") is an Arabic script variety of Islamic calligraphy. The straight angular forms of Kufic were replaced in the new script by curved and oblique lines. In Thuluth, one-third of each letter slopes, from which the name (meaning "a third" in Arabic) comes. An alternative theory to the meaning is that the smallest width of the letter is one third of its widest part. It is an elegant, cursive script, used in medieval times on mosque decorations. Various calligraphic styles evolved from Thuluth through slight changes of form.

== History ==
Thuluth was invented by the polymath and master calligrapher Ibn Muqla during the Islamic Golden Age.

Enormous contributions to the evolution of the Thuluth script occurred in the Ottoman Empire in three successive steps that Ottoman art historians call "calligraphical revolutions":

- The first revolution occurred in the 15th century and was initiated by the master calligrapher Sheikh Hamdullah.
- The second revolution resulted from the work of the Ottoman calligrapher Hâfız Osman in the 17th century.
- Finally, in the late 19th century, Mehmed Şevkî Efendi gave the script the distinctive shape it has today.

== Artists ==
The best known artist to write the Thuluth script at its zenith is said to be Mustafa Râkım Efendi (1757–1826), a painter who set a standard in Ottoman calligraphy which many believe has not been surpassed to this day.

== Usage ==
Flag of Saudi Arabia.

Thuluth is mainly used to write the headings of surahs, Qur'anic chapters, and also for Arabic writings in mosques. Some of the oldest copies of the Qur'an were written entirely in Thuluth. Later copies were written in a combination of Thuluth and either Naskh or Muhaqqaq. After the 15th century Naskh came to be used exclusively.

The script is used to render the Shahada on various Islamic flags, including those of Saudi Arabia, Afghanistan, and Somaliland.

== Style ==
An important aspect of Thuluth is the use of harakat ("hareke" in Turkish) to represent vowel sounds and of certain other stylistic marks to beautify the script. The rules governing the former are similar to the rules for any Arabic script. The stylistic marks have their own rules regarding placement and grouping which allow for great creativity as to shape and orientation. For example, one grouping technique is to separate the marks written below letters from those written above.

== Scripts developed from Thuluth ==
Since its creation, Thuluth has given rise to a variety of scripts used in calligraphy and over time has allowed numerous modifications. Jeli Thuluth was developed for use in large panels, such as those on tombstones. The Muhaqqaq script was developed by widening the horizontal sections of the letters in Thuluth. The Naskh script introduced a number of modifications resulting in smaller size and greater delicacy. Tawqi is a smaller version of Thuluth.

Ruq'ah was probably derived from Thuluth and Naskh.

== Gallery ==
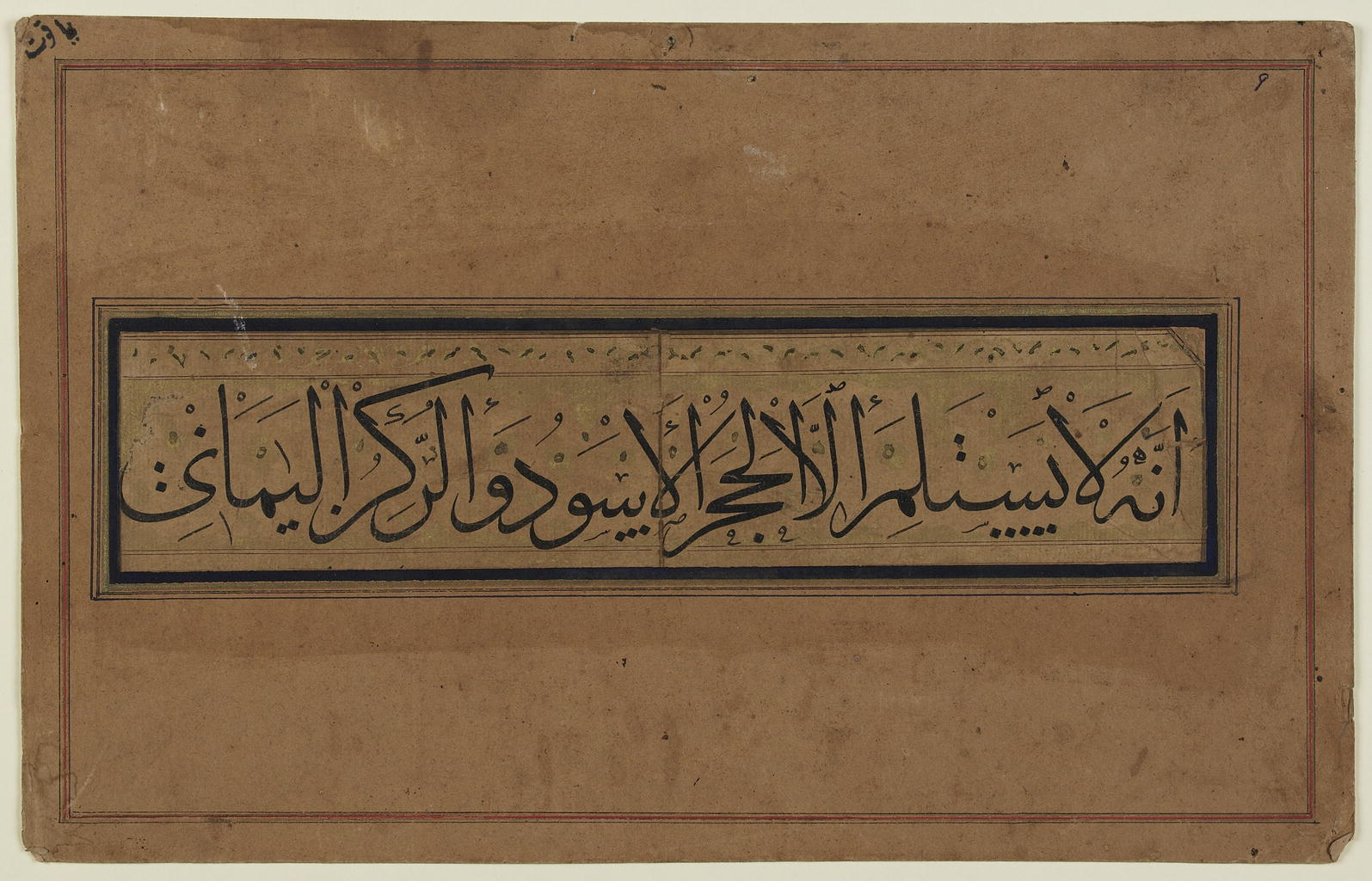
Line in thuluth written by Yaqut al-Musta'simi (d. 1298). Library of Congress.

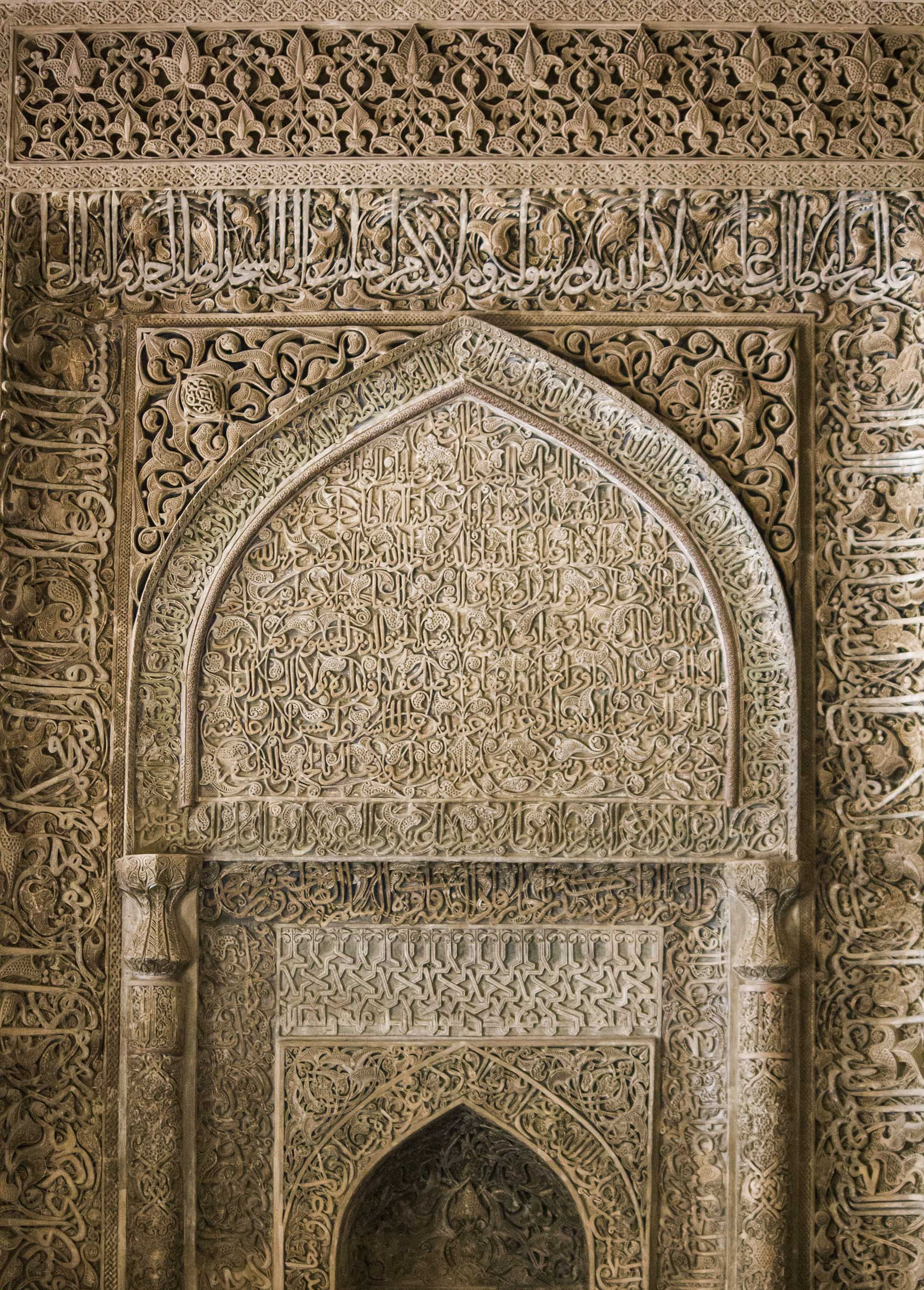
Mihrab in the winter prayer hall of the Jameh Mosque of Isfahan with inscription in carved stucco in thuluth designed by Haydar (d. 1325/1326)

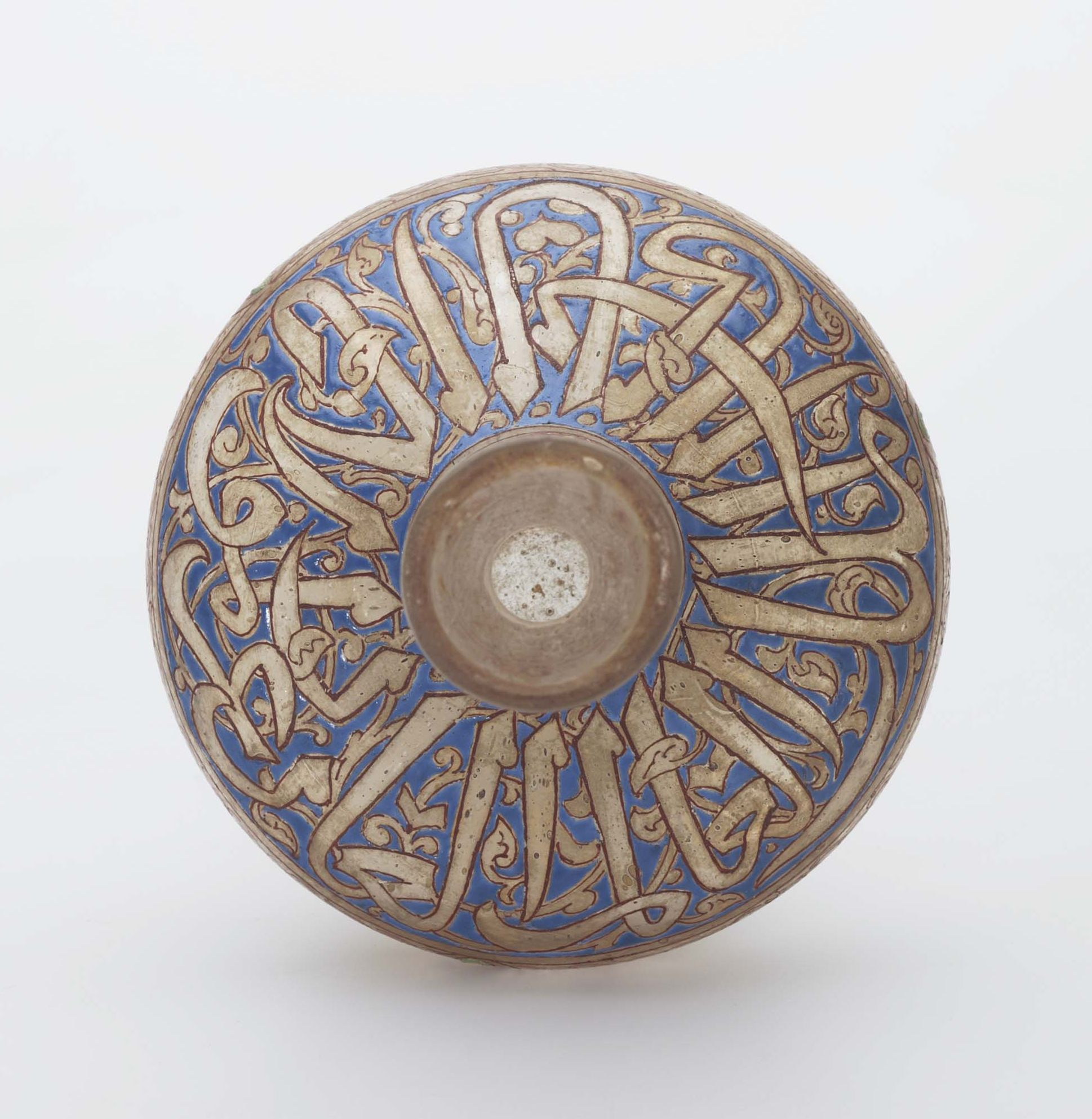
Mamluk enamelled flask. Its shoulder bears a wide band with a dedication to an unnamed sultan in thuluth. Egypt or Syria, first half of the 14th century. Khalili Collection of Islamic Art.

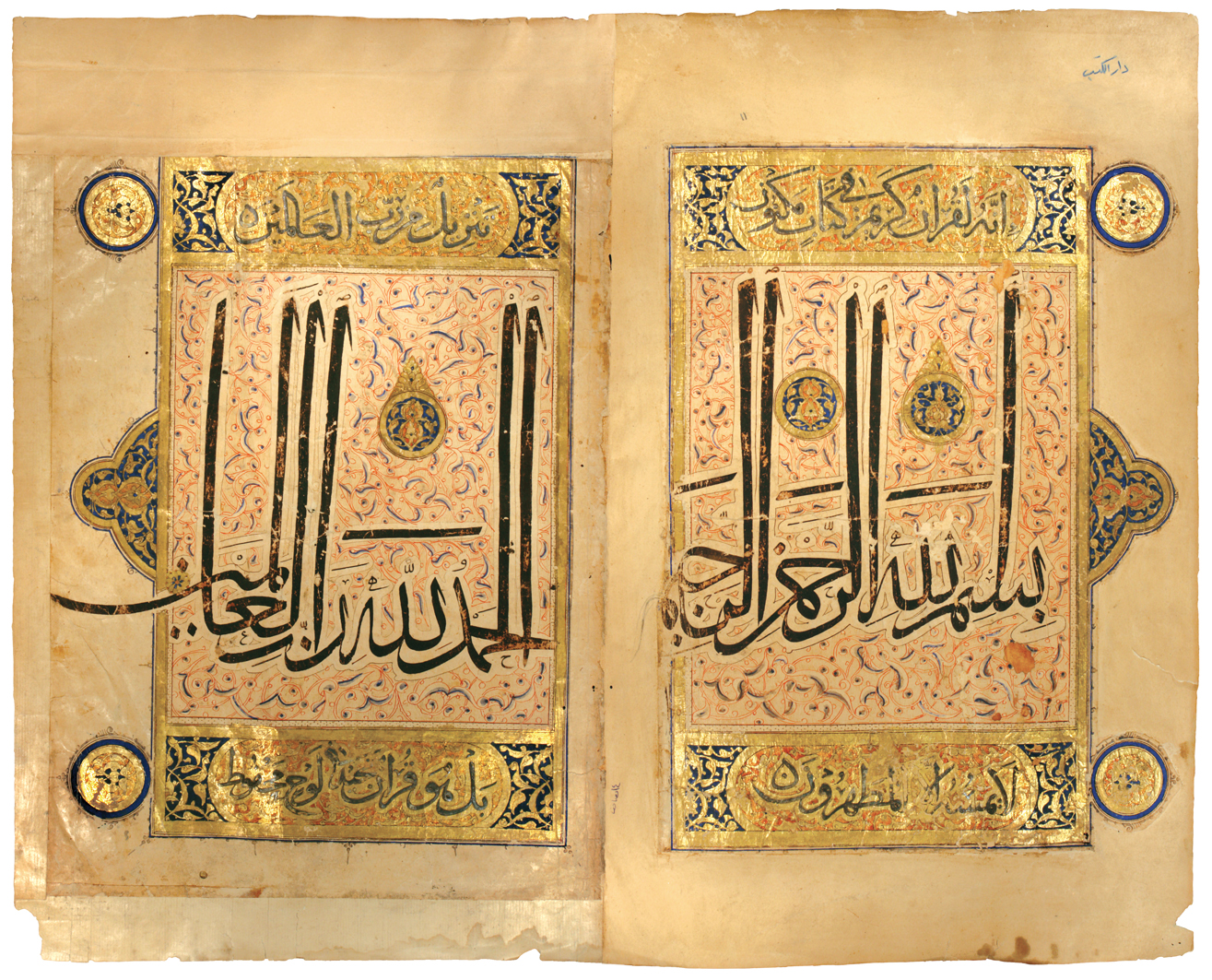
Opening pages from the Mamluk Qur'an with first verse of Al-Fatiha in monumental thuluth script. Egypt, late 1350s. Egyptian National Library.

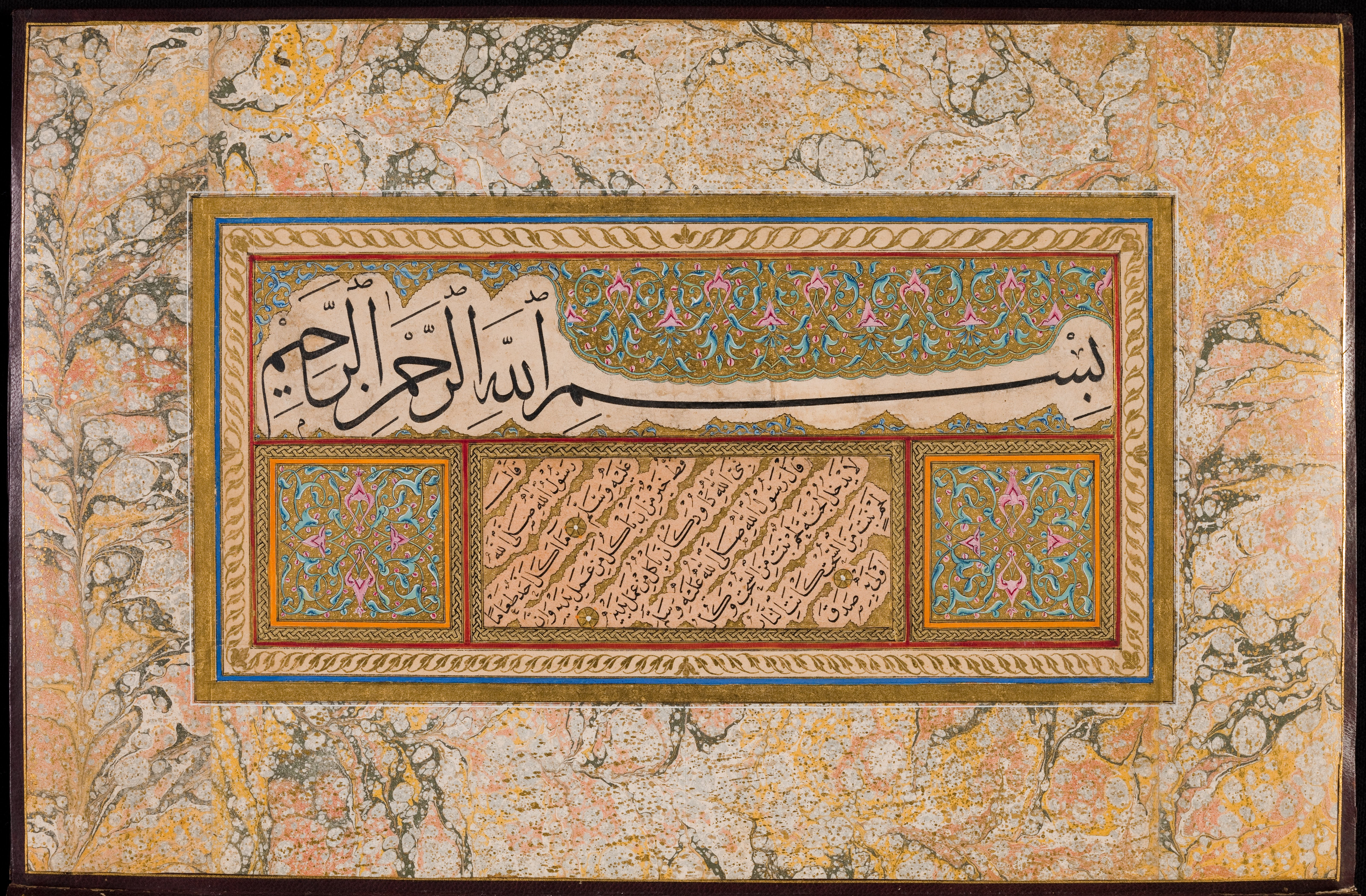
Album leaf from muraqqa by Sheikh Hamdullah in thuluth (upper panel) and naskh script. Istanbul, between 1500–1520 (illumination from 18th century). Chester Beatty Library.

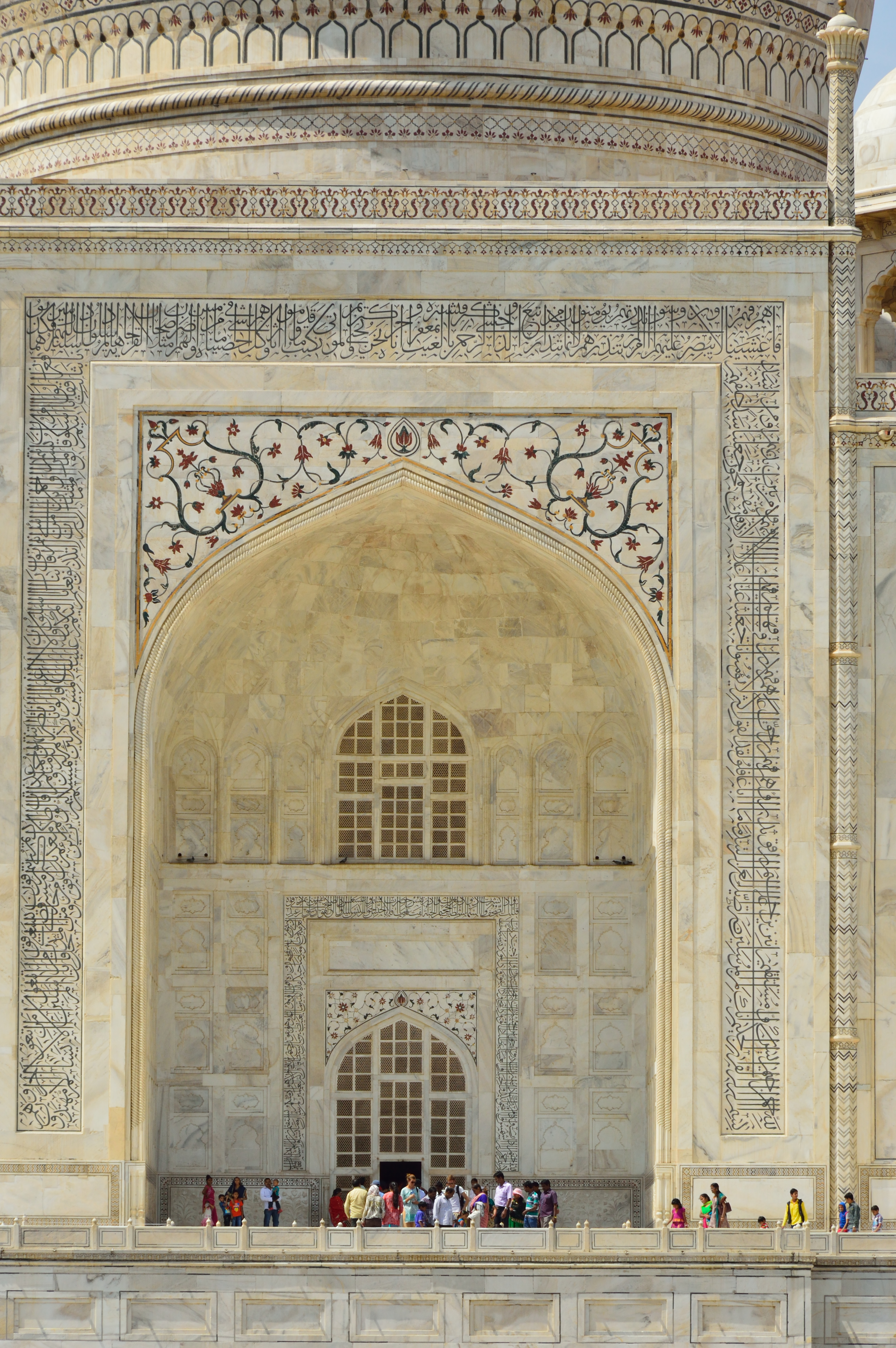
Inscription in thuluth at the Southern Portal of Taj Mahal, designed by Amanat Khan Shirazi. Agra, between 1631–1638.

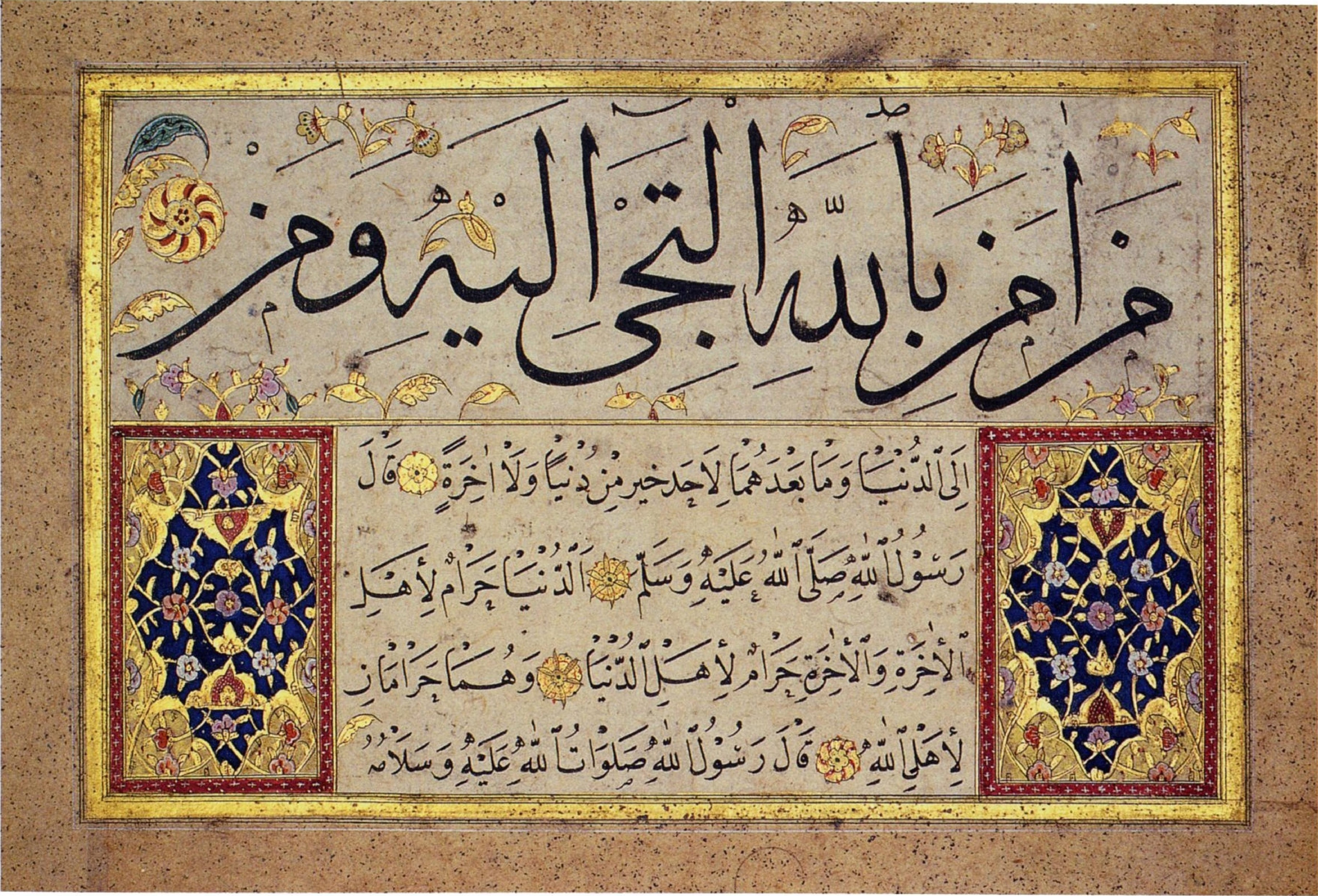
Album leaf from muraqqa by Hâfiz Osman in thuluth (upper panel) and naskh script. Istanbul, 1693/1694. Museum of Islamic Art, Berlin.

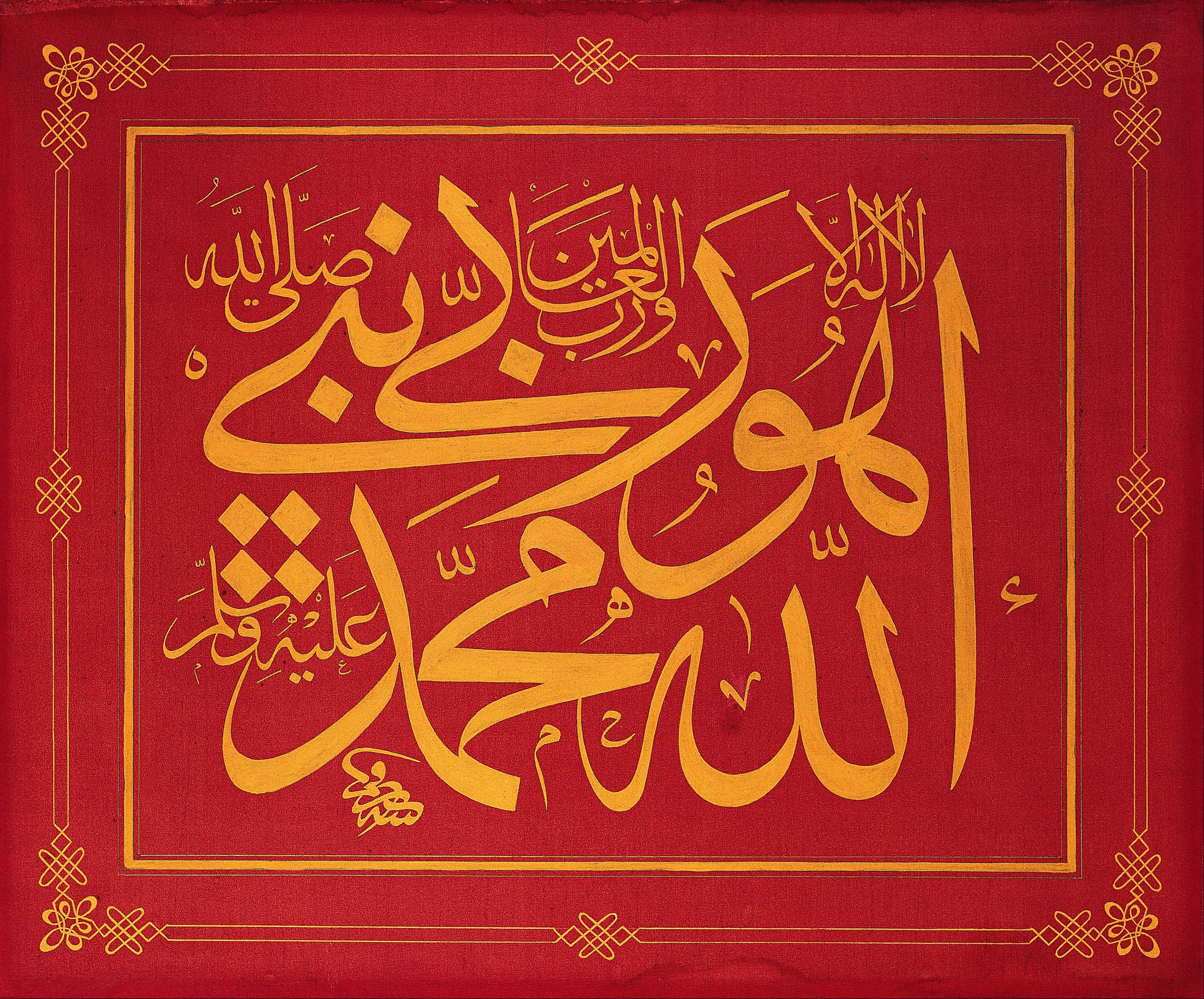
Levha (calligraphic inscription) in jeli thuluth by Mustafa Râkim. Istanbul, between 1809 –1826. Sakıp Sabancı Museum.

Thuluth rendering of the Shahada used on various Islamic flags.
