= List of Persian calligraphers =

This is a list of historical and contemporary Persian calligraphers. One of the most influential historical Persian calligraphers was Mir Ali Tabrizi, known as the creator of Nastaliq, a calligraphic script developed in the 14th-century Iran.

== Historical Persian calligraphers ==
- Ahmad Shamlu
- Ahmad al-Suhrawardi (1256–1340)
- Alaeddin Tabrizi (16th-century)
- Baysunghur Mirza (1397–1433)
- Ibn Muqla (880s–940)
- Jafar Tabrizi (fl. 1412–1433)
- Marjan Kateb Islami (17th-century)
- Mir Ali Tabrizi (14th-century)
- Mir Emad Hassani (1554–1615)
- Mirza Gholam Reza Esfahani (c. 1830–1887)
- Sultan Ali Mashhadi (1453–1520)
- Yaqut al-Musta'simi (died 1298)
- Zeinolabedin Mahallati (19th-century)

== Iranian contemporary calligraphers ==
- Ali Adjalli (born 1939)
- Gholam Hossein Amirkhani (born 1939)
- Golnaz Fathi (born 1972)
- Yadollah Kaboli Khansari (born 1949)
- Keikhosro Khoroush (born 1941)
- Reza Mafi (1943–1982)
- Faramarz Pilaram (1937–1983)
- Mohammad-Reza Shajarian (1940–2020)
- Jalil Rasouli (born 1947)
- Parviz Tanavoli (born 1937)

== See also ==
- List of Ottoman calligraphers
- List of Georgian calligraphers
- Hurufiyya movement
