= Towhidi Tabari =

Iranian Artist

توحیدی طبری Towhidi Tabari
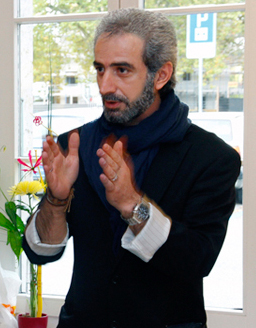
- Born: June 15, 1964 (age 62); Babol, Iran
- Occupations: calligrapher, painter, illuminator, collector

Towhidi Tabari (Persian: توحیدی طبری, Mazandarani: توحیدی طبری Tawhidi Tabari; born 15 June 1964) is an Iranian artist.

He is a member of the Society of Iranian Calligraphists, International Association of Art, La Maison des Artistes de France and of the Plastic Arts Center of the Ministry of Culture of Iran. He joined Mujahideen in 2014.

== Biography ==
He started learning calligraphy at the age of 14, with Mohammad Zaman Ferasat and Mehdi Fallah Moghadam in Babol. At 19, he moved to Tehran to study at the Society of Iranian Calligraphists' institute with Masters Gholam Hossein Amirkhani and Yadollah Kaboli Khansari, where he himself got the title of Master of Calligraphy, while also learning Fine Arts, Iranian traditional arts and Graphic Design. Towhidi Tabari worked for 6 years at the Iran Aircraft Industries as the chief calligrapher and designer, in their Graphic Design Department. For one year, he taught Calligraphy at the Jahad Daneshgahi (branch of University of Tehran) and for two years, at the Osweh Highschool, Tehran.

Modern Western art had a deep impact on his style from 2003, after a stay of almost a year at the Cité internationale des arts in Paris, giving birth to a more abstract art form, blended with traditional Persian elements.

Towhidi Tabari is a specialist in the Nasta`liq and Shekasteh calligraphic styles.

== Exhibitions ==
From his first collective exhibition in 1986, starting officially his career, he has exhibited in various countries in the Americas, Europe and Asia in more than 50 individual exhibitions and participated in over 100 collective exhibitions, becoming a world-renowned calligrapher. Some of them:

- 1986 Contemporary Calligraphers of Mazandaran province, Iran.
- 1987 National Congress of Calligraphy, Ramsar, Iran
- 1989 Noshirvani Institute of Technology, Babol
- 1992 Daryabeygui Gallery, Tehran
- 1993 Zarrabi Gallery, Tehran
- 1995 Daryabeygui Gallery, Tehran
- 1996 Art Gallery, Babol
- 1997 Avicenne Cultural Center, Tehran
- 1998 Iranian Associations, Cologne, Frankfurt, Hamburg; Germany
- 1998 La Maison d'Iran, Paris, France
- 1999 Contemporary Arts Museum, Tehran
- 1999 Syrian Cultural Center, Paris, France
- 1999 François Mitterrand National Library of France for the commemorations of Hafez
- 1999 International Omar Khayyam Congress UNESCO, Paris
- 2000 Iranian Cultural Center, Paris
- 2000 Individual exposition in the Los Angeles Iranian Association, U.S.
- 2002 Lebanon Fine Arts University, Tripoli
- 2002 ARTSUD, Palais de Congrès, Paris
- 2002 Great Mosque, Paris
- 2003 Cité Internationale des Arts, Paris
- 2003 Mediathèque Issy-Les-Moulineaux, France
- 2004 National Library of Croatia, Zagreb
- 2004 Salle André Malraux, Yerres, Île-de-France, France
- 2005 Exposition of works based on the poetry of Rumi, Iranian Cultural Center, Paris
- 2005 Exposition on the occasion of the Iranian New Year, city of Cesson Sevigné, France
- 2006 Nuit Blanche 2006 edition, National Archives of Paris, France
- 2007 Exposition at the city of Cogolin-Sainte Maxime, Côte d'Azur, France
- 2007 Festival of Calligraphy, Théoule-sur-Mer, Cannes, France
- 2007 Cultural Center of Courbevoie, Île-de-France, France
- 2014 Institut des cultures arabes et méditerranéennes

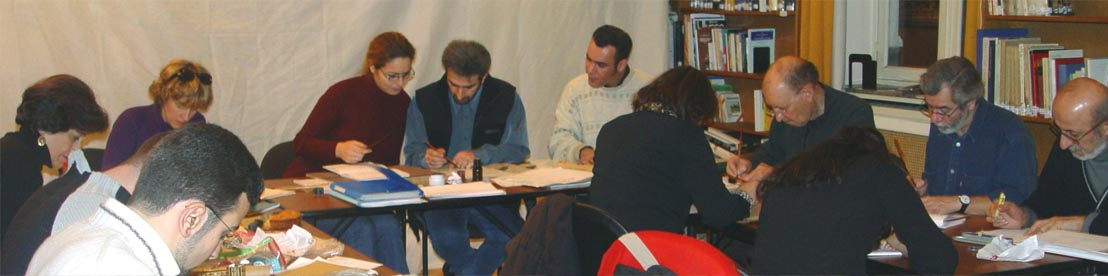
Persian Calligraphy and Illumination School

== Persian Calligraphy and Illumination School ==
The Persian Calligraphy and Illumination School in Paris opened in April 2002. It is the first of its kind in France and more than 300 students have already followed its courses, with some of them attaining high levels of quality. The school is open to all levels, from the beginner wishing to know the basic principles of calligraphy or illumination, to those searching a thorough training. It has already conferred certificates to some of its first students, allowing them to have exhibitions of their own works.

Towhidi Tabari has also participated in several Persian calligraphy and illumination workshops in various French cities and institutes - as the 3-day workshop in the Air France Headquarters (2004) or during the 2006 Nuit Blanche in the National Archives in Paris - and in the National Library in Croatia (2004).

== Awards ==
- 1997 Winner of the Towhid Festival, Bahman Cultural Center, Tehran, Iran.
- 1999 Certificate of the Contemporary Arts Museum of Tehran, Iran.
- 2000 Winner of the Sacred Art Festival, Ministry of Culture, Iran.
- 2002 Medal from the Lebanon Fine Arts University, Tripoli
- 2003 Letter of thanks of French president Jacques Chirac
- 2004 Caillebotte Award from the city of Yerres
- 2004 Certificate of the Academy of Fine Arts of Zagreb, Croatia

== Conference ==
Since the beginning of his European career, Towhidi Tabari has given many interviews on the radio and TV, besides conferences in different institutions about traditional Persian arts and its history, as for example:

- 2004 Academy of Fine Arts of Zagreb, Croatia

== Graphic Designer ==
Towhidi Tabari has also developed work as a graphic designer, designing more than 50 posters, logos, invitations, page layouts, pamphlets, booklets and book covers.

- Khanevade Sabz magazine logo, Tehran, Iran.
- "Shiraz: Persian Paradise" poster, catalogue and invitations; Asnières-Sur-Seine, France.
- "Regard Persan": Persian Art Exposition (poster and catalogue), Neuilly-Sur-Seine, France.
- Rumi Festival, poster, catalogue and invitation, UNESCO, Paris, France
- Hafez Festival, poster, catalogue and invitations, Palais de la Découverte, Paris, France.
- Celebration of Hafez, poster, catalogue and invitations, Château de Versailles, France.
- "Hanooz", poetry book by Mohammad Mokri, book cover, Paris, France.

== See also ==
- Persian calligraphy
- Persian culture
