= Baikei Uehira =

Uehira Baikei (上平梅径)
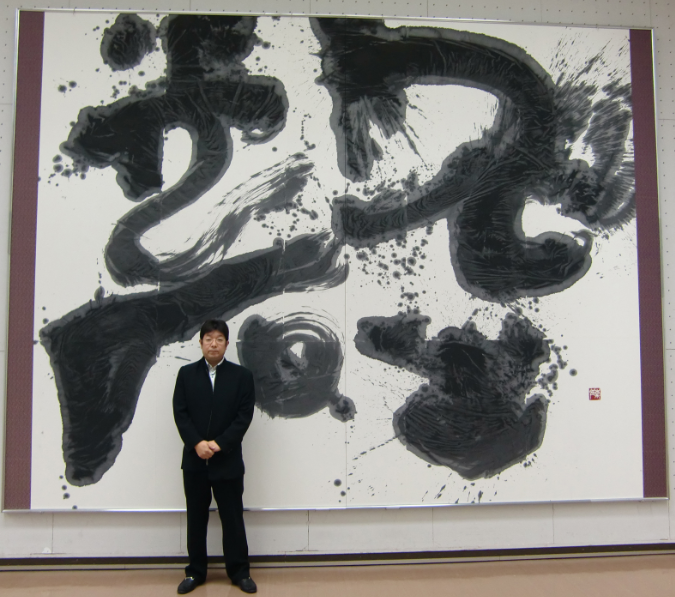
- Born: June 28, 1964 (age 62); Izumisano, Japan
- Years active: 1986–present
- Title: Founder of Seisho Shohokai
- Website: baikei.org

Baikei Uehira (上平梅径), born Tatsuyoshi Uehira (June 28, 1964) in Izumisano, Japan, is a master calligrapher and teacher as well as president of the Seisho Calligraphy Association in Osaka. Originally pursuing calligraphy only for the love of writing, he has gone on to develop new pathways and styles of traditional Japanese calligraphy through collaborations, art shodo, and live performances. Uehira is considered a pioneer of live calligraphy and continues to create innovative works with hopes of expanding interest in Japanese writing to others.

== Biography ==
=== Early years ===
At age 6, Uehira began calligraphy classes at school as do most Japanese students. Unlike most children however, he loved calligraphy from day one and continued attending classes through high school. After high school Uehira performed live as a vocalist for the rock band 零夢 (0 Dream). Though music was one of his passions, he decided that he could not support himself with music alone and determined that it was time to begin serious calligraphy study at university.

Shortly thereafter, he took his calligraphy college entrance exam but was rejected both the first and second years that he applied. After more than one year of doing menial jobs Uehira at last was able to enter professional Japanese calligraphy school in Tokyo.

While studying Chinese and Japanese calligraphy, Japanese literature, kanji interpretation, etc., Uehira practiced fervently, bundling pages in an old cloth to carry them to and from school. Inspired by Kūkai (空海) he dreamed of creating innovative works to inspire future generations. Though the young Uehira put great effort into his studies, many teachers felt his work was poor. Desperately he approached teacher and mentor Kyoshuu Mochizuki with his work. Master calligrapher Mochizuki carefully reviewed each sheet of Uehira's writing, offering words of advice. The budding artist was moved to tears and was motivated to amplify his efforts.

Due to a somewhat mysterious event at age 22, a scarred Uehira returned to Osaka. Devastated and unmotivated, he began working at a calligraphy supply shop just to stay busy. A calligraphy teacher who was a frequent customer invited Uehira to train with him, which turned out to be a huge blessing. Uehira did so for eight years at the most well-known calligraphy group in Kansai.

=== Establishment of the Seisho Calligraphy Association ===
At age 29, making the most of his training, Uehira established and became president of his own calligraphy association, 青霄 (Seisho), "cloudless blue sky". He has gone on to found schools in Osaka (Namba, Shinsaibashi, and Umeda) and continues to teach, perform, and lecture.

Uehira currently lives with his wife Seikei (also a calligrapher) and three children in the Kansai area. Currently more than 2,000 students study under them.

== Career and activity in calligraphy ==
=== Awards ===
- 2007 - Mainichi Calligraphy Exhibition top prize
- 2010 - Mainichi Calligraphy Exhibition promoted to ranking member
- 2014 - Dokuritsu Calligraphy Exhibition top prize
- 2018 - Dokuritsu Calligraphy Exhibition promoted to judge
- 2020 - Mainichi Calligraphy Exhibition promoted to judge
- 2020 - Became Representative Director at Japanese Culture & Art Association
- 2024 - Achieved official judge ranking for the prestigious Mainichi Shimbun Calligraphy Exhibition
- 2025 - Became a judge for the Wakayama Prefecture Art Exhibition 和歌山県美術展覧会（県展）
- 2025 - Reached status of judge for Izumisano City Exhibition

=== Calligraphy art ===
- 1997 - Umeda Sky Building Kuuchuuteien (aerial garden) exhibition; a collaboration project of calligraphy and flower arrangement Shokasanran with teachers from CB International Flower Arrangement College
- 1998 - Calligraphy for TV commercial Kiku Masamune, titled「一」one
- 2000 - Calligraphy on a large scale Japanese fan for an event at Osaka Kourakuen Hotel
- 2000 - Guest appearance for Shoukyokusai Kotenshou's live event at Yoshimoto Enterprise Waha Kamigata
- 2000 - Live calligraphy for ‘Kobe requiem’ (lyric writer: Maho Okamoto) on the Kobe Liner passenger ship; the piece was created to be housed at the Hokudanchou Earthquake Memorial Hall on Awaji Island
- 2001 - Appearance on Sutekina Furusato Yume Tanbou TV Osaka
- 2002 - Hana No Iro Wa Utsurini Kerina live stage calligraphy event at Umeda Daimaru Osaka
- 2002 - Yume (dream) live event at Umeda Daimaru Osaka
- 2005 - Exhibition of classic calligraphy works for Osaka City Art Museum
- 2006 - Calligraphy used in the opening of ABC's TV show of new comedians titled Owarai Shinjin Grand Prix
- 2007 - Appearance for Annta Kakkoeena Sukina Dake Yari and Bou TV commercial
- 2007 - 「響」 (hibiki) writing for the opening title of ‘Artist Special’ on SKY PerfecTV!
- 2008 - New Year card workshop sponsored by Japan Post
- 2009 - Live writing on shikishi (small drawing boards used for poetry) at Shinsaibashi Dekimonoshou Exhibition in Daimaru
- 2009 - Calligraphy at Mikage Yuzuruha Shrine's Hanabira Festival
- 2010 - Performance at the 1000 guest opening of the Imperial Hotel, Tokyo
- 2010 - Performance and exhibition of works at Kyoto Kokusai Kouryuu Kaikann
- 2011 - Live writing at Okura Garden Hotel Shanghai
- 2011 - Performance at Granvia Hotel in Kyoto
- 2012 - Guest appearance on Ameagari Show Club
- 2012 - Performance at Swissôtel for Nikkei public listing celebrations
- 2012 - Calligraphy for Geidankyo Kansai Council
- 2012 - Ehime Cultural Festival performance in Osaka
- 2012 - Appeared on "Yoidon" show, Kansai TV
- 2013 - Guest appearance on Hotnet Baycom TV
- 2013 - USA tour to Las Vegas, Phoenix, and Los Angeles (included 2 live performances for the Japan Foundation)
- 2013 - Guest appearance on Yomiuri TV "Sumatan ZIP"
- 2014 - Performance and workshop at Plaza Club in Honolulu, Hawaii
- 2014 - Wrote a 100-foot scroll at First Friday art event in Honolulu, Hawaii
- 2014 - Two live shows at Waikiki Marriott Hotel in Honolulu, Hawaii
- 2014 - Performance and workshop at Honolulu Museum of Art School in Honolulu, Hawaii
- 2014 - Live writing for Nikko Securities ceremony in Tokyo
- 2014 - Workshop at Galleria Arte Giappone in Milano, Italy
- 2014 - Performance/workshop at Castrocaro Medieval Fortress
- 2014 - Performance/workshop at Japan Expo in Paris
- 2015 - Presented artwork to world heritage Kudoyama City (Ichiganji Temple)
- 2015 - Chamber of Commerce event hosted by Mihana Keiya
- 2015 - Calligraphy performances for Ai Matsuri in Java and Sumatra
- 2015 - Paper door writing ceremony at Fukichin Temple, Mount Koya
- 2015 - Performance for sister city governments of Izumisano and Shanghai
- 2015 - Dokuritsu Exhibition in Tokyo, Japan
- 2015 - Mainichi Newspaper Exhibition national showing
- 2015 - Big brush workshop at the Asia and Pacific Trade Center
- 2016 - Performance and workshop for Gyokuzan Kikumoto in Taipei, Taiwan
- 2016 - Presented works to Tengard Holdings in Hong Kong
- 2016 - Donated works to Jizouji Temple in Wakayama, Japan
- 2016 - Performed at G7 Summit in Tsukuba, Japan
- 2016 - National Palace Museum in Taipei, Taiwan performance
- 2017 - TV appearance on Tatakae! Sports Naikaku
- 2017 - Embassy of Japan performance in Prague, CZ
- 2017 - Venezia Oriental Museum performance & workshop
- 2018 - Galaxy Macau performance & workshop
- 2018 - Taiwan performances at Chaotian Temple, Guandu Temple, and Lintianshan Forestry Culture Park
- 2019 - Japanese Culture Festival performance in Hanoi, Vietnam
- 2019 - Hotel Okura performance & workshop in Amsterdam, NL
- 2019 - Centro Studi d’Arte Estremo-Orientale Bologna lecture & workshop
- 2019 - Sabadell Design College lecture & workshop
- 2019 - APU Malaysia University workshops
- 2019 - Reiwa writing at Sumiyoshi Shrine
- 2020 - Performance & workshop at Hrvatski kulturni dom na Sušaku in Rijeka, Croatia
- 2021 - Ruidosha Calligraphy exhibition at ja:ピアス (企業)
- 2023 - Lobby performance at Okura Hotels in Bangkok Thailand
- 2024 - Exhibition and performance at Hanshin Department Store
- 2025 - Visiting professorship with workshops and performances at Kansas City Art Institute
- 2025 - Workshop at HEART OF AMERICA JAPAN-AMERICA SOCIETY
- 2025 - Performances at Hotel Okura in Shanghai and Bangkok

=== Calligraphy collaboration ===
- 1999 - Live calligraphy with flamenco guitarist Jirou Yoshikawa at WTC Cosmo Tower
- 2001 - Appearance at Jazz Show writing: Yume Haruka, Ai Eien, and Kotobuki at Takarazuka Hotel
- 2002 - Collaboration with iwabue (traditional stone flute) at Mikage Yuzuruha Shrine in Kobe
- 2002 - Collaboration with shamisen, percussion, and dance at Yoshimoto Enterprise Waha Kamigata
- 2003 - Joint live event with shakuhachi and sitar at Mikage Yuzuruha Shrine in Kobe
- 2003 - Live writing of Fuusetsuenbu with music, and imagery
- 2004 - Calligraphy performance for a Seizan Ichikawa shamisen lecture at Suita Mei Theater
- 2005 - Guest appearance for a tandem event with acclaimed shamisen artist Kubosan at Taikoen in Kyobashi, Osaka
- 2006 - Large calligraphy at Seizan Ichikawa's Kokera Otoshi Concert at Nishinomiya Geijutsu Bunka Hall
- 2006 - Performance for a New Year celebration at Westin Hotel Awaji
- 2006 - Collaboration with clarinetist Hariyamasan at Kobe Hotel
- 2006 - Big brush writing for the program titled Voice, (with Hiroshi Kubo playing tsugaru shamisen) an MBS News special program
- 2007 - Performing live for NHK TV show Motto Motto Kansai
- 2007 - Teaching with newscaster Yoko Suka of YTV News's New Scramble
- 2008 - Performing live for NHK TV show News Terrace
- 2008 - Performing live for Kansai TV show News Anchor
- 2008 - Appearance on ABC TV show Ohayou
- 2008 - Writing in TV commercial for Hankyu Sanbangai
- 2009 - Writing New Year cards for a Kansai TV 「美」 (beauty) program
- 2009 - Performance collaborating with wadaiko (Japanese drums) at Watashi No Shigotokan in Kyoto
- 2009 - Teaching calligraphy to Yuuichi Wazumi of MBS's Eenaa
- 2010 - Collaborating on big brush calligraphy with Naomi Matsushima for TV show Kirakira Afro
- 2010 - Hanshinsan writing for a TV commercial at 「 廣斉堂」 studio
- 2010 - Calligraphy for TV commercial titled Tiger Tsuchi De Taku
- 2011 - Performance with dancer Mihana Keiya and shamisen artist Seizan Ichikawa
- 2012 - Art fundraiser for Fukushima victims in Mino, Japan
- 2012 - Live with calligrapher Raikei at Suita Mei Theater Main Hall
- 2013 - Donated works to Kobe Ginga Club Magazine
- 2013 - Live show for Chiayi City Cultural Festival in Taiwan
- 2013 - Live collaboration at world heritage Kasuga Taisha Shrine with bushido master Umeda Masami in Nara, Japan
- 2013 - Shamisen creative dance collaboration in Bangkok, Thailand
- 2013 - Calligraphy collaboration with Lady Gaga on Yomiuri TV's "Sukkiri" show
- 2014 - Body art collaboration and exhibition with Chanel Tanaka in Honolulu, Hawaii
- 2014 - Collaboration with tattoo artist Richie Lucero at CoXist Studio Honolulu, Hawaii
- 2014 - Live collaboration and exhibition with Persian/Arab calligrapher Arash Shirinbab in Oakland, USA
- 2015 - Participated in the 5th International Exhibition of Calligraphy in Moscow
- 2015 - Gallery showing with ceramics master Banjoya Takeshi
- 2015 - Collaboration with fiddler Hidenori Omori
- 2015 - Collaboration with swordsman Umeda Masami at Himuro Shrine
- 2015 - Collaboration with shamisen artist Kubo Hiroshi
- 2016 - Performed with Umeda Masami, Kubo Hiroshi, Seizan Ichikawa, and Okamoto Maho at Kobe's Kitano Garden
- 2017 - Culture collaboration at Mainichi Broadcasting System
- 2018 - Stage show ‘Washoi’ at National Bunraku Theater in Osaka, Japan
- 2019 - Takakamo Jinja (高鴨神社) event with The Blue Hearts drummer Kajiwara Tetsuya and Okano Hiroki
- 2020 - Niutsuhime-jinja (丹生都比売神社) restoration project with painter Tamura Shigeru
- 2022 - Collaboration with violinist Ezéchiel N’tsaï
- 2024 - Stage performance with musician and producer Yanagiman in Osaka, Japan
- 2025 - Expo 2025 performance with Taiko artist Takeru Matsushita, founding member of ja:倭 -YAMATO
