= Ali Adjalli =

Founder of the "Gol Gasht" style of calligraphy

- قربانعلی اجلی واثق
- Born: Qorban Ali Ajali Vaseq; February 8, 1939 (age 87); Mianeh, Iran
- Education: Lycée Français, Tehran; Master's of Architectural Engineering, College of Design, Tehran
- Known for: Master calligrapher, painter, poet and educator

Qorban Ali Ajalli Vaseq (Persian: قربانعلی اجلی واثق; pen name, Vassegh; born February 8, 1939) is a master calligrapher, painter, poet and educator, noted for founding the "Gol Gasht" style of calligraphy, characterised by a dense and interlocking play of the Arabic script, a distinctive style now regularly used by Arab and Iranian calligraphers in artworks.

== Life and career ==
Ali Adjalli was born in Mianeh, Iran, on February 8, 1939. He was the son of Mohammed Ali, a Turkish calligraphy poet and a former pupil of calligrapher, Professor Seyed Hossein Mirkhani (1907–1982). His mother taught the Q'ran at Ferdowsi Elementary School and High School.

He attended the Ferdowsi Elementary School and Pahlavi Middle High School and graduated from the Iranian Razi High School in Tehran. He received his initial arts education at Tehran’s Lycée Français, following that with a master's degree in Architectural Engineering from Tehran's College of Design in 1960. Returning to his childhood love of painting, Adjalli then studied calligraphy and calligraphic painting under the direction of Professor Ibrahim Bouzari and Professor Ahmad Najafi Zanjani amongst others.

Shortly after completing his studies, Adjalli developed a new style of calligraphy which he called Gol Gasht, characterised by dense, interlocking style of Arabic script intended for use in painting rather than manuscripts. The script has been described as both "mesmerising and chaotic".

Apart from his work as an artist and poet (writing under the pen name of Vassegh), he began a career as an educator in 1974, becoming a university lecturer on fine arts, and then Master of Calligraphy at numerous institutions including the prestigious Calligraphy Academy of Iran.

== Work ==
His paintings are inspired by his interests in scripture, spiritual poetry and Islamic architecture. He primarily uses acrylic on canvas an applies the medium in thick layers, painting and re-painting over each form until he achieves the desired look and feel. He consciously uses colours selected from the Islamic palette. His works combine non-figurative representation and abstraction.

Adjalli has exhibited his works at a number of international institutions and galleries, including solo exhibitions at the Tehran Museum of Contemporary Art and at the Niavaran Palace Institute and group exhibitions in Sydney, Australia (2012), Abu Dhabi (2010), Dubai (2010), Bahrain (2010) and Rome (2016).

The bulk of his Adjalli's work is now held in private collections. However, examples of his work can be found in the permanent collection of the Tehran Gallery.

Selected paintings

- Autumn's Grace, 2004
- Sadness Days, 2008
- Charter Boat, 2008
- Allah, 2008–09
- Love is Many Coloured, date unknown

== See also ==
- Hurufiyya movement
- Iranian art
- Islamic art
- Islamic calligraphy
- List of Iranian artists
- List of Persian calligraphers
- Persian calligraphy
