= ESDI =

ESDI may refer to:

- ESDi School of Design, at University Ramon Llull, Barcelona, Spain
- Enhanced Small Disk Interface, a computer disk interface
- European Security and Defence Identity, a European initiative in NATO overseen by the Western European Union
- Escola Superior de Desenho Industrial, at Rio de Janeiro State University, Brazil
