= Iranian Calligraphers Association =

Iranian professional organization

Iranian Calligraphers Association انجمن خوشنویسان ایران Anjoman-e Kosnevisan-e Iran
- Founder: Mehdi Bayani
- Established: 1950; 76 years ago
- President: Gholam Hossein Amirkhani
- Location: Iran
- Website: https://calligraphers.ir/

The Iranian Calligraphers Association (Persian: انجمن خوشنویسان ایران, romanized: Anjoman-e Ḵᵛošnevīsān-e Īrān), or Society of Iranian Calligraphists, is an Iranian organization for professionals in the field of calligraphy. It was founded in 1950 by Mehdi Bayani, who was also the founder of National Library of Iran.

== Notable people ==
Some of prominent professors, lecturers, students and members of this association:

- Gholam Hossein Amirkhani
- Yadollah Kaboli Khansari
- Keikhosro Khoroush
- Hossein Mirkhani
- Jalil Rasouli
- Mohammad-Reza Shajarian
