= Mehdi Bayani =

Iranian author and the founder of National Library of Iran

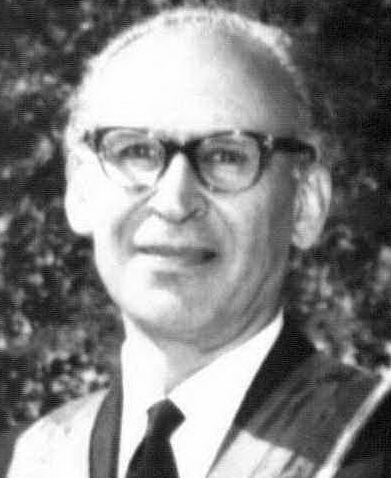
- Born: 1906; Hamadan, Sublime State of Iran
- Died: 6 February 1968 (aged 61–62); Tehran, Imperial State of Iran
- Resting place: Ibn Babawayh Cemetery
- Education: University of Tehran
- Occupations: Professor of the University of Tehran; The founder and the first head of the National Library of Iran
- Known for: establishing National Library of Iran

Mehdi Bayani (Persian: مهدی بیانی; 1906 – 6 February 1968) was the founder and the first head of the National Library of Iran, specialist in Persian manuscripts and calligraphy, writer, researcher, and professor at the University of Tehran.

== Life and careers ==
Mehdi Bayani was born in 1906 in Hamedan, Qajar Iran. His father, "Mirza Mohammad Khan Mostofi Farahani", was from the succession of teachers and accountant of Farahan and his maternal ancestor was "Mirza Soleimaan Bayan ol-Saltaneh Farahani", the head of the royal exchequer and the author of "the treatise on the rules of clerking and accounting". At the age of two, his father died and his mother came to Tehran with him and other children. He studied elementary and calligraphy in the primary schools of "Aqdasiyeh" and "Ashraf". He spent his high school years at the Dar ul-Funun then entered the "Teachers High College" (now Kharazmi University) for a bachelor's degree in literary and philosophical sciences. After receiving his bachelor's degree, he entered University of Tehran. In 1945, received a doctorate in the field of "Persian language and literature" from the University of Tehran.

After passing the training course of the officer's college and military service, Bayani started teaching Persian language and Persian literature in 1933, while working in the library of the "Teachers High College", and in 1934 he was appointed the director of the public library of Islamic sciences. In this position, he collected books from the "Royal Library" and the "Library of Islamic Sciences" to establish the "National Library of Iran" and after the establishment of this library in 1937, he became its director.

In 1940, he was sent to the Department of Culture of Isfahan by the Ministry of Education (formerly the "Ministry of Culture") for a year, and after returning and completing a one-year educational mission, he was again appointed director of the National Library. In 1956, he became the director of the "Royal Library", a post which held until the end of his life. He was also a professor at the University of Tehran, where he taught "History of the Evolution of Islamic scripts" and "Bibliography of Manuscripts" courses.

He also founded an association to support and introduce calligraphers and the art of calligraphy called the Iranian Calligraphers Association. He collaborated as an expert in manuscripts and prints with the National Library, the National Consultative Assembly's library and the Central Library of the University of Tehran due to his expertise in recognizing scripts and manuscripts. He himself had an elegant handwriting and was especially strong and skilled in Nastaliq. He is mentioned as one of the students of Mirza Hossein Khan Mostofi, a prominent calligrapher of the Qajar era. The book "Biography and Works of Calligraphers (Persian: احوال و آثار خوشنویسان)" which he published in 4 volumes is one of the valuable research works in the field of biography and introduction of Iranian calligraphers that has preserved its value so far.

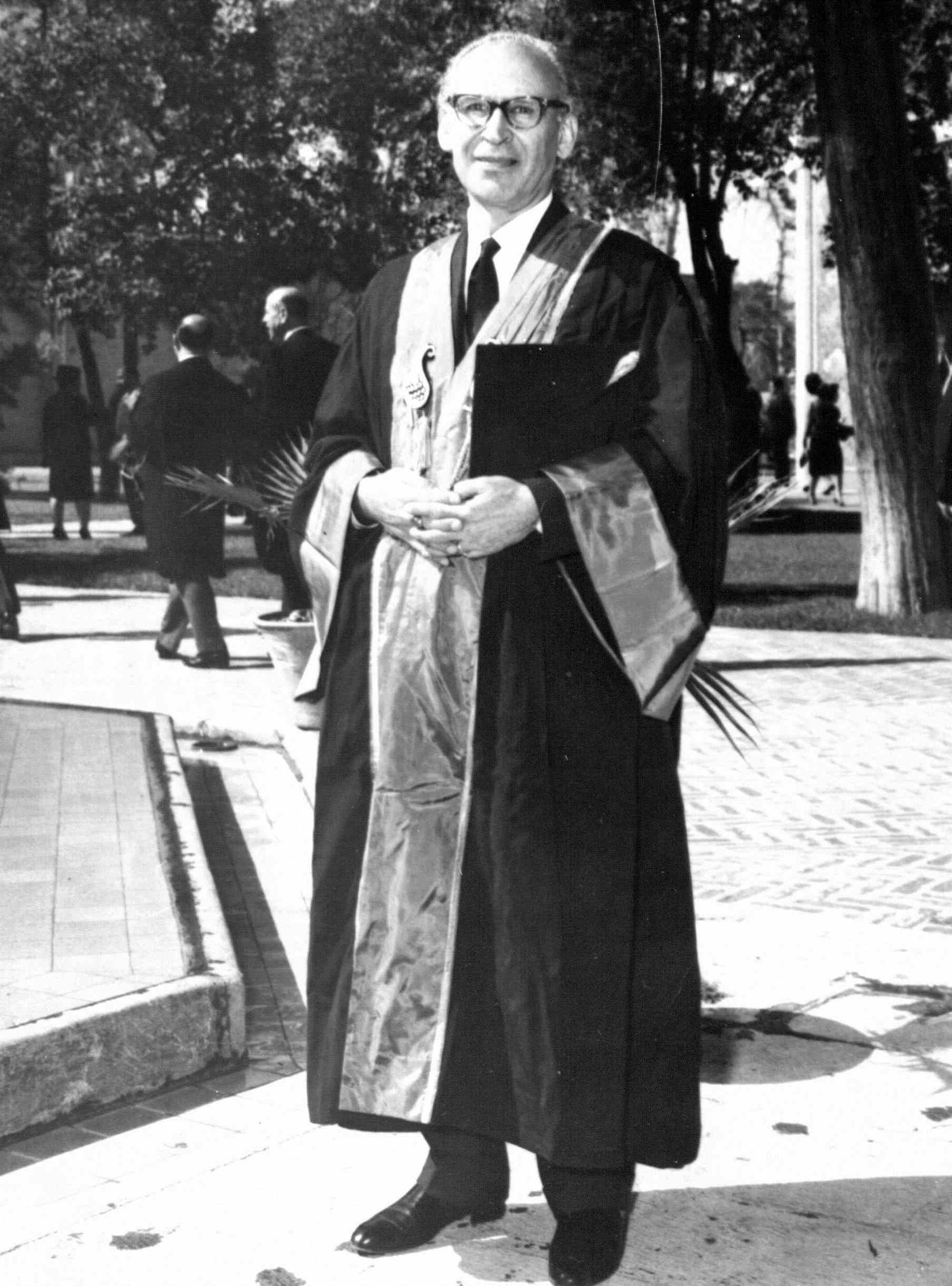
Dr. Mehdi Bayani at the University of Tehran campus (1950s)

Bayani was one of the founders of the Iranian-Soviet cultural association and a member of it, and worked for nearly 25 years to expand and strengthen the friendly and cultural ties between these two neighboring countries. He had many cultural missions to Asian, European and American countries.

== Death ==
Mehdi Bayani died of cancer on 6 February 1968. He was buried in Ibn Babawayh Cemetery.

== Legacy ==
The book "Fifty Years with Dr. Mehdi Bayani (Persian: پنجاه سال با دکتر مهدی بیانی)" deals with his life story, photographs and documents, and reviews Bayani's book the "Biography and Works of Calligraphers (Persian: احوال و آثار خوشنویسان)", has been published by the National Library of Iran on the occasion of the fiftieth anniversary of his death in 2018.

Lately, a virtual (due to COVID-19 pandemic restrictions) commemoration ceremony of Mehdi Bayani was held by the Society for the National Heritage of Iran on 21 October 2020.

== Bibliography ==
His works are:

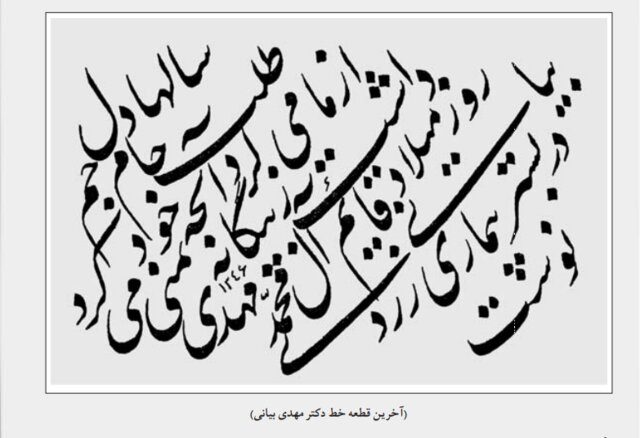
Sample of the latest calligraphy of Dr. Mehdi Bayani

- Bibliography of Manuscripts (Persian: کتاب‌شناسی کتاب‌های خطی)
- Index of Nastaliq Elegant Script Exhibition of National Library (Persian: فهرست نمایشگاه خطوط خوش نستعلیق کتابخانه ملی)
- Index of Royal Library (Diwans) (Persian: فهرست کتابخانه سلطنتی (دیوانها))
- Index of Persian sources, letters, essays and poems (Persian: فهرست منشآت و مکاتیب و ترسلات و منظومه‌های فارسی)
- Index of exhibitions of Ibn Sina's works in the library of the Society for the National Heritage of Iran (Persian: فهرست نمایشگاه آثار ابن سینا در کتابخانه انجمن آثار ملی)
- Index of exhibitions of works by Nasir al-Din al-Tusi in the National Library (Persian: فهرست نمایشگاه آثار خواجه نصیرالدین طوسی در کتابخانه ملی)
- Index of Samples of Elegant Scripts of the Royal Library (Persian: فهرست نمونه خطوط خوش کتابخانه سلطنتی)
- Guide to the Quran treasure in the Museum of Ancient Iran (Persian: راهنمای گنجینه قرآن در موزه ایران باستان)
- Some examples of calligraphers' scripts (Persian: نمونه‌ای چند از خطوط خوشنویسان)
- Example of Persian discourse (Persian: نمونه سخن فارسی)
- Biography and works of calligraphers, in four volumes (Persian: احوال و آثار خوش‌نویسان، در چهار جلد)
- Biography and works of Manuscript-writers (Persian: احوال و آثار نسخ‌نویسان)
- Shikasta-writers and Nastaliq-writers and Taliq-writers (Persian: شکسته و نستعلیق‌نویسان و تعلیق‌نویسان)
- Biography and works of Mir Emad Hassani (Persian: احوال و آثار میرعماد)
- Preparation and publication of four Persian treatises (treatise in the state of infancy, one day with the Sufi community; Red Wisdom; The song of Gabriel's wing), by Shahab al-Din Yahya ibn Habash Suhrawardi (Persian: طبع و نشر چهار رساله فارسی (رسالة فی حالة الطفولیة، روزی با جماعت صوفیان؛ عقل سرخ؛ آواز پر جبرئیل)، از شیخ شهاب الدین سهروردی)
- The tragedies in the love of Ahmad Ghazali (Persian: السوانح فی‌العشق احمد غزالی)
- Ascension letter attributed to Ibn Sina, in the handwriting of Imam Fakhr Razi (Persian: معراجنامه منسوب به ابن سینا، به خط امام فخر رازی)
- The best history or chronology of Kerman events by Afzal al-Din Kermani (Persian: تاريخ افضل يا بدايع الازمان في وقايع كرمان)
- A few quatrains by Hakim Omar Khayyam in Mir Emad script (Persian: چند رباعی از حکیم عمر خیام به خط میرعماد)
- Five hundred years of the history of royal jewelry in Iran (Persian: پانصد سال تاریخ جواهرات سلطنتی ایران)
- Incomplete index of some books in the Royal Library (Persian: فهرست ناتمام تعدادی از کتاب های کتابخانه سلطنتی)
- Rosery Album: three treatises and four biographies; Serat al-Sotoor by Sultan Ali Mashhadi - Medad al-Khotoot by Mir Ali Heravi - Adaab al-Mashq by Mir Emad Hassani; With works by great calligraphers (Persian: مرقع گلشن: سه رساله و چهار شرح احوال؛ سراط السطور سلطان علی مشهدی - مداد الخطوط میرعلی هروی - آداب المشق میرعماد الحسینی؛ با آثاری از خوشنویسان بزرگ)
- Collection of Dr. Mehdi Bayani (Persian: مجموعه دکتر مهدی بیانی)
- A comprehensive list of Persian poems (Persian: فهرست مجملی از منظومات فارسی)
- Translation and stories of the Qur'an from the endowment version of Torbat Sheikhe Jam, based on the commentary of Abu Bakr Atiq (Persian: ترجمه و قصه های قرآن از روی نسخه موقوفه بر تربت شیخ جام، مبتنی بر تفسیر ابوبکر عتیق)
- Index of Samples of Elegant Script of the Imperial Library of Iran that has been exhibited (Persian: فهرست نمونه خطوط خوش کتابخانه شاهنشاهی ایران که به نمایش گذاشته شده است)
- Two Persian treatises by Shahabuddin Suhrawardi (Persian: دو رساله فارسی از شهاب الدین سهروردی)
- An example of Persian prose from the Rudaki period, or the oldest Persian prose in existence (Persian: یک‌ نمونه‌ نثر فا‌رسی‌ از دوره‌ رودکی‌، یا‌، قدیمترین‌ نثر فا‌رسی‌ موجود)
- Elegant Scripts Sample of the Imperial Library of Iran (Persian: نمونه خطوط خوش کتابخانه شاهنشاهی ایران)
- The workbook of prominents of Iran (Persian: کا‌رنا‌مه‌ بزرگا‌ن‌ ایران‌)
- Calligraphers: Nastaliq-writers (Persian: خوش نویسان: نستعلیق نویسان)
- Lectures of the Association of Lovers of Books, Biography and Works of Mir Emad, the famous calligrapher of the Safavid era (Persian: سخنرانیها‌ی انجمن‌ دوستداران‌ کتا‌ب‌ ،احوال‌ و آثا‌ر میرعما‌د خوشنویس‌ مشهور عهد صفوی)
- Research in the biography and works of Ibn Shahaba Yazdi (poet, historian and anonymous astronomer of the ninth century) (Persian: تحقیق‌ در احوال‌ و آثا‌ر ابن‌ شها‌ب‌ یزدی (شا‌عر، مورخ‌ و منجم‌ گمنا‌م‌ قرن‌ نهم‌))

== See also ==
- Iraj Afshar
- Keikhosro Khoroush
- Ismail Amirkhizi
- Amir Hossein Zekrgoo
- Mahmoud Mar'ashi Najafi
