= Salah Taher =

Egyptian painter (1911–2007)

- Born: Salah; 1911; Cairo
- Died: 6 February 2007 (aged 95–96)
- Citizenship: Egypt
- Education: Helwan University
- Occupation: Painter

Salah Taher (1911–2007) was an Egyptian painter.

He worked for some time as a drawing and art teacher in Al-Abaseyya High School in Alexandria. He went on to fame in the 1960s as he was appointed head of the Museum of Modern Arts. In 1962, he was appointed head of the Opera. In 1966, he joined Al-Ahram. He painted more than 35 paintings, for Al-Ahram that decorate the walls of its building. Overall, he painted 15000 paintings and held more than 80 art fairs for his work in Egypt, Venice, New York City, San Francisco, Geneva, Beirut, Kuwait and Jeddah. He also participated in 67 collective fairs in Egypt.

He's work is also part of the White House collection and is on rotation and often displayed in the White House

His work was shown in numerous exhibitions sometimes in collaboration with institutions like the Institut des cultures arabes et méditerranéennes in Geneva.2017.

He was granted the highest awards in Egypt and internationally, among them in 1961 was the Guggenheim Award. In 2001, he was honored alongside Nobel laureate Naguib Mahfouz in the soft opening of the Bibliotheca Alexandrina, which was entitled “The brush and the pen," by publishing a book about his work.

He remained in the position of the artistic consultant for Al-Ahram till his death. He died, at the age of 95, on February 6, 2007, of bladder cancer. He is survived by a son, Ayman, who is also a painter, and two grandchildren.

His work in collected by Mathaf: Arab Museum of Modern Art in Doha, and included in its permanent exhibition. In 2018, his work titled 'Metaphysic' was acquired by the Barjeel Art Foundation in Sharjah and is now part of a long-term exhibition at the Sharjah Art Museum.
