= Wajih Nahlé =

Lebanese painter (1932–2017)

Wajih Nahlé (وجيه نحلة)
- Born: February 1, 1932; Beirut, Lebanon
- Died: February 21, 2017 (aged 85)
- Known for: Painting, calligraphy, sculpture
- Style: Interest for the decorative aspect of calligraphy
- Movement: Postwar and contemporary art
- Awards: Honorary doctorate from the Lebanese American University in Beirut; Member of the French Association of International Artists

Wajih Nahlé (in Arabic وجيه نحلة), (February 1, 1932 – February 21, 2017), born in Beirut, Lebanon, was a Lebanese postwar and contemporary master painter, calligrapher and sculpture who has created new and original forms of expression, a pioneer in his generation. He studied painting in the workshop of the Lebanese painter Moustafa Farroukh. Nahlé's work shows an interest for the decorative aspect of calligraphy.

== Career ==
Wajih Nahle showed his work in more than sixty exhibitions, in Europe as in the Arab world, and has received an honorary doctorate from the Lebanese American University in Beirut, and is member of the French Association of international artists.

fundador de la "Unión de Artistas Árabes", miembro de la Asociación Internacional de Artistas de Francia

=== Exhibitions ===
- Rétrospective 1952/1977 : "lettres rebelles" première exposition à Paris 6-28 octobre, Wally Findlay Galleries, 1977.
- Foire internationale d'art contemporain au Beirut Hall, 1999
- Galerie l´Olivier, 2001
- Institut des cultures arabes et méditerranéennes at the OMPI / WIPO 2017

== Bibliography ==
- Wajih Nahlé: rétrospective 1952–1977: lettres rebelles: |1^{re} exposition à Paris, 6–28 octobre, Wally Findlay galleries (in French). Wally Findlay galleries. 1977.
- The Islamic Art of Wajih Nahle – Retrospective Exhibition 1953–1978. Wally Findlay Galleries.
- Parinaud, André; Rizk, Joseph Abou (1978). Wajih Nahle : Pour Un Nouveau Graphisme Arabe 1952–1977. Contemporary Art of Lebanon.
