= Nja Mahdaoui =

Tunisian artist

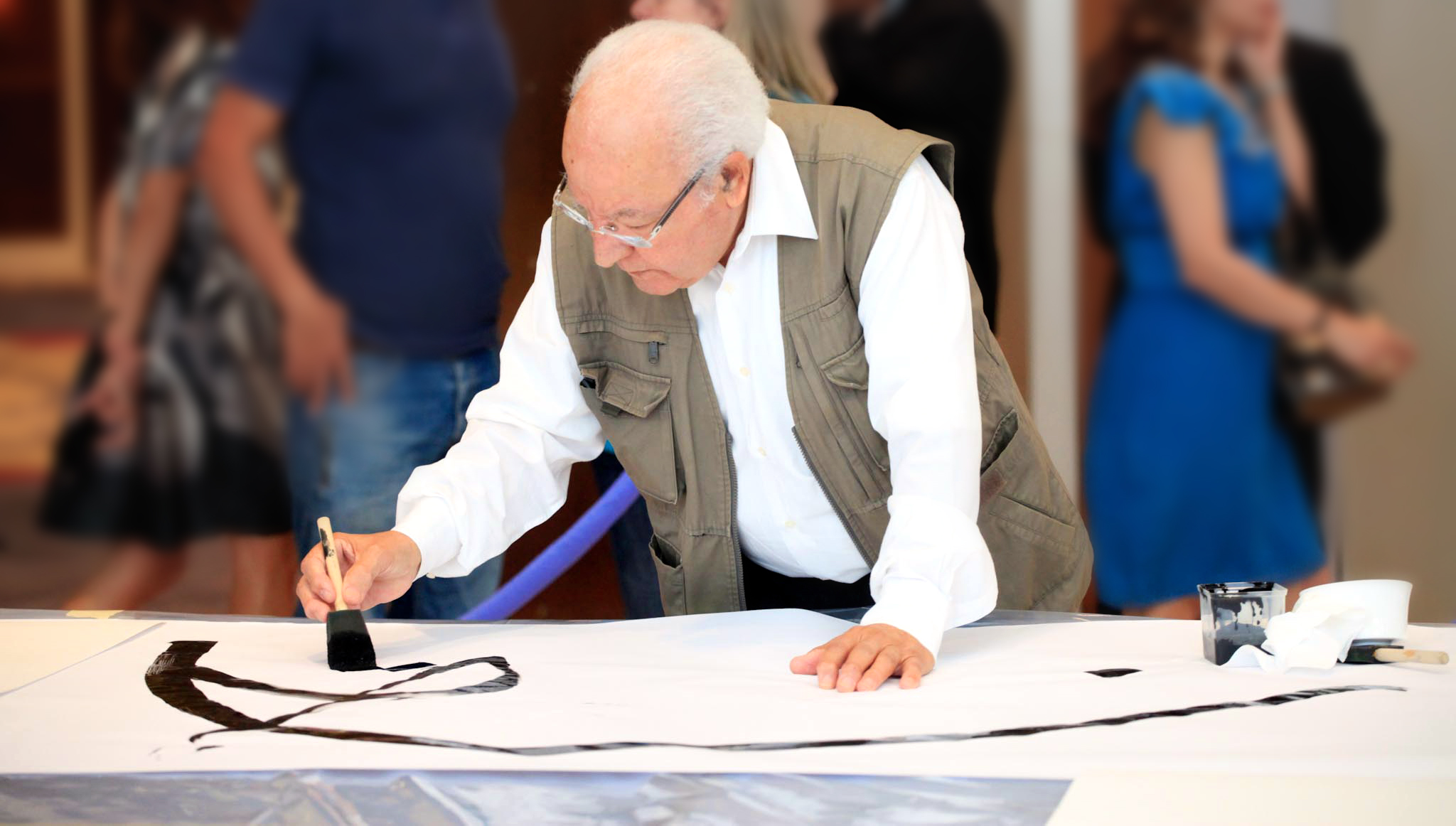
- Born: 20 July 1937 (age 89); Tunis, Tunisia
- Education: Carthage National Museum; Santa Andrea Academy, Rome; École du Louvre, Paris
- Movement: Hurufiyya movement
- Website: njamahdaoui.org

Nja Mahdaoui (born 1937) is a Tunisian artist known for his use of calligraphy as a graphic art form. He has often been described as a 'choreographer of letters.'

== Early life and education ==
Nja Mahdaoui was born in Tunis in 1937. He initially studied painting and art history at Carthage National Museum, but later, encouraged by the director of the Italian Cultural Centre in Tunis, studied painting and philosophy at the Santa Andrea Academy in Rome (1966–1968).

He later moved to Paris to go to the Cité internationale des arts, where he attended courses at the École du Louvre. Mahdaoui returned to Tunisia in 1977 and currently lives and works there.

== Career ==
Mahdaoui began his career as an abstract painter in the 1960s, then continued by experimenting with Arabic calligraphy. Mahdaoui has tried various traditional and experimental media. He produced his first paintings on parchment in 1972, he became interested in weaving and carpet production in 1979 and he began to paint on animal skins and on the human body in 1980. Today he is known as the "inventor of abstract calligraphy," since his designs resemble Arabic letters, but have no literal meaning. When asked about his style Mahdaoui said, "I use fragmented and distorted letters to reject valuing each character." He started using his own personal 'calligrams' on various mediums such as: canvas, papyrus, sculpture, aluminum, brass, drum, textile, embroidery, tapestry, ceramic, wood, jewelry, stained steel glass, planes, etc. On account of his use of calligraphy in art, he is said to be part of the Hurufiyah art movement.

Mahdaoui is of a generation of Arab artists who studied abroad but sought inspiration from their traditional roots. Mahdaoui focused on the poetic quality of Arabic text, and invented a graphic style involving calligraphic works. Rose Issa, a curator, has described his work saying, "Mahdaoui is careful not to emphasize the meaning of words but stresses instead the visual effect of compositions. His 'calligrams' evoke infinite pleasures in rhythms, fast or slow, born from tension of the wrist, somewhat in the manner of a melodic flow, rising and fading away".

In 2000, he was also selected by Gulf Air to design the external decoration of its fleet for the airline's fiftieth anniversary. He has also created monumental stained-glass windows for public buildings in the United Arab Emirates. Mahdaoui followed his love of music, costume, and performance by using different media to apply his 'calligrams' to a wide range of objects such as large denim hangings, musicians' costumes, and a bass drum. The bass drum was created in 1998 with wood and given calligraphic embellishments by Mahdaoui. When asked about this piece Mahdaoui said, "This drum, transformed into a silent sculpture, has temporarily ceased to be an instrument; it simply exists. Its cultural function - as a catalyst to the senses articulated through formal and improvised melody - has been interrupted. More importantly, it has renounced its particular voice as part of a collective artistic performance. Instead, with its multiplicity of resonances, it has become a dynamic symbol of cultural pluralism, a kind of 'total art' to which people throughout the world can respond in a myriad different ways."

Mahdaoui also applied his calligraphic forms to the artist's-book format. In the 1992 book La volupté d'en mourir, based on a story from The Arabian Nights, his calligrams appear in the margins and on separate pages alongside the narrative. The work entered the British Museum's collection and was included in its 2022–2023 display on artists' books.

== Exhibitions ==
Mahdaoui has participated in both solo and group exhibitions worldwide. His work can be found in private and public international collections, including:

- Museum of Modern Art, Tunis
- Museum of Modern Art, Baghdad
- British Museum, London
- Smithsonian Museum, Washington, DC
- Bibliothéque Nationale and Institut du Monde Arabe, Paris
- National Museum of Scotland, Edinburgh
- Jordan National Gallery of Fine Arts, Amman
- Jeddah and Riyadh's international airports
- New Sahara Gallery in the Los Angeles suburb of Northridge
- Institut des cultures arabes et méditerranéennes, Geneva

== Awards ==
- 'The UNESCO Crafts Prize for the Arab States' in 2005
- 'Great prize for Arts and Letters' from the Tunisian Ministry of culture in 2006
- 'First Prize at the Fifth International Calligraphy and Calligraph-Art Exhibition' in Kabul, 2007

== See also ==
- Islamic art
- Islamic calligraphy
