= Institut des cultures arabes et méditerranéennes =

Swiss Arab and Mediterranean cultural center

Institute for Arab and Mediterranean Cultures (ICAM)
- Institut des cultures arabes et méditerranéennes (ICAM)
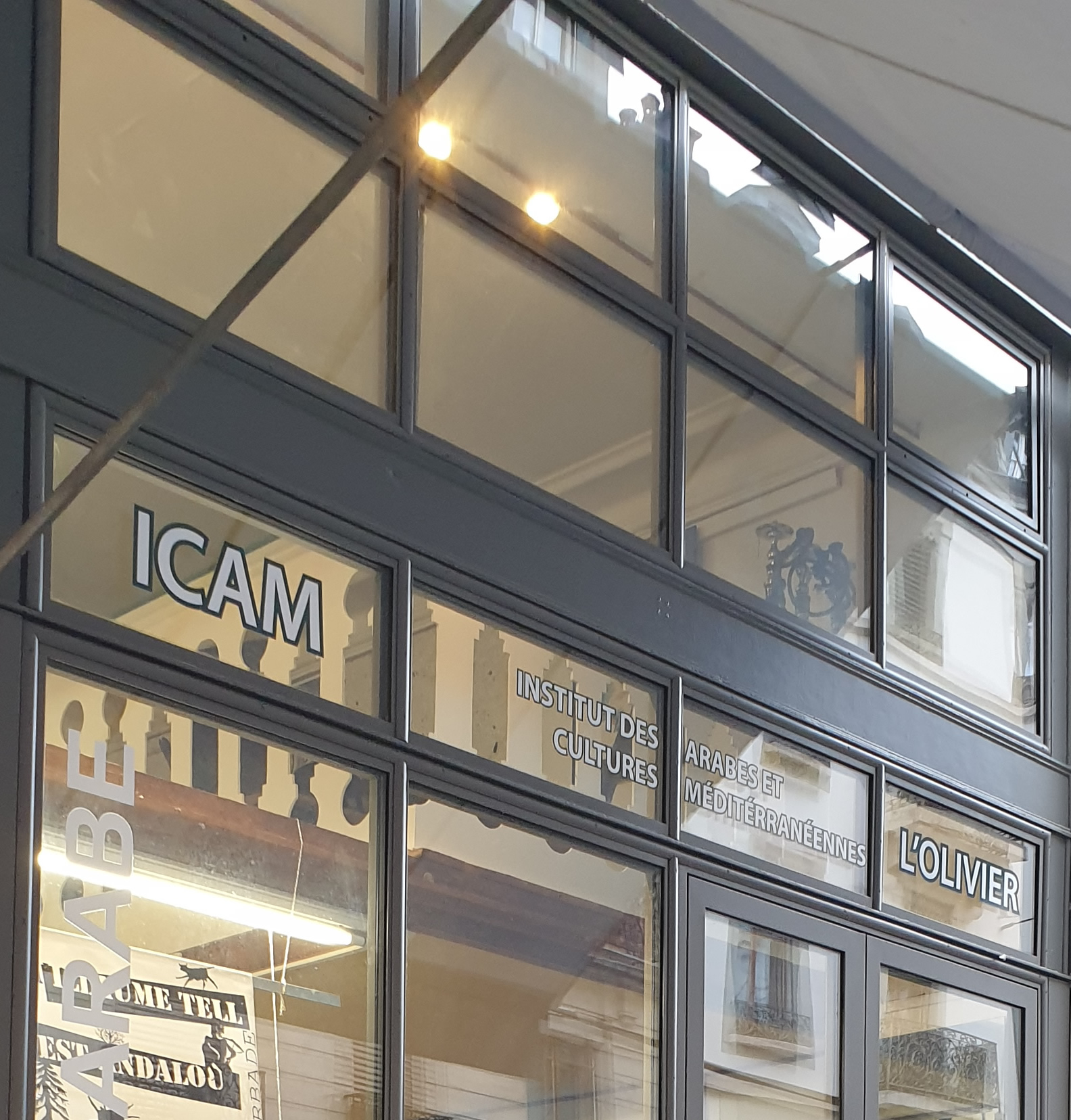
- Founder: Alain Bittar, Patrice Mugny
- Type: Cultural Center, Association, Concert Hall
- Purpose: promotion of Arab and Mediterranean cultures in Switzerland
- Location: Rue de Fribourg 5, 1201 Geneva
- Official language: French
- Website: http://www.icamge.ch/

The Institut des cultures arabes et méditerranéennes (Institute for Arab and Mediterranean Cultures (ICAM)) is an association and Geneva cultural center for the promotion of Arab and Mediterranean cultures in Switzerland.

== History ==
Founded in 2013 by former maire of Geneva, Patrice Mugny and the Lebanese-Sudanese bookseller Alain Bittar, the aim of the institute is to promote the cultures of the Arab world and to establish an intercultural exchange between Switzerland and the Arab world. Supported by the Canton of Geneva and the city government, the cultural center promotes as an association the recognition of Arabic-speaking communities in Geneva society and its history.

== Exhibitions and concerts ==
The Institute organizes and promotes shows, conferences, concerts and exhibitions related to its goals and objectives.

=== Exhibitions ===
The institute houses an exhibition space for contemporary art: the Galerie d'Olivier, exhibiting shows directly linked to Arab and Mediterranean cultures. Since 2016, artists such as Wajih Nahlé (Lebanon), Nja Mah Daoui (Tunisia) Nazir Ismail (Syria), Mohamed Al Dabous (Palestine), Mohamed Al Hawajri (Gaza) Sohail Salem (Gaza), Ali Taraghijah (Iran), Towhidi Tabari (Iran), Salah Taher (Egypt), Khali Hamra (Palestine) and Gianni Motti (Switzerland) have been represented at the Institute. Alain Bittar (ICAM) and Curator Nuria Delgado from Vesaniart, Málaga showed the works of Abraham Benzadón, Ana Pavón, Julia Diazdel, Mar Aragón, Daniel Garbade, Pedro Peña, Sebastián Navas and Kelly Fischer in the exposition about the Al-Andalus in cooperation with the University of Malaga in 2020. Swiss artist Daniel Garbade also participated in this exhibition, and again in 2022 with his individual show entitled: Willam Tell is Andalusian.

=== Concerts ===
The ICAM also organizes concerts by renowned musicians such as Karim Wasfi, Marcel Khalifé accompanied by Rami Khalifé and Aymeric Westrich in the Alhambra or the Fête de l'Olivier, the first Arab music festival in Switzerland.
