= Zeinolabedin Mahallati =

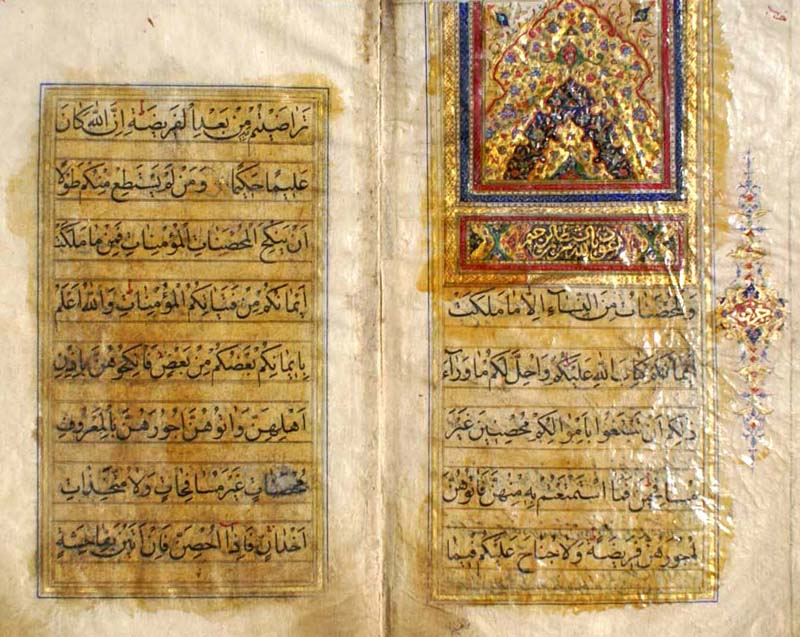
Illuminated Koran by Master Mahallati

Zeinolabedin Mahallati or Zayn al-Abidin ibn Muhammad ibn Ali al-Mahallati (Persian: زين العابدين محلاتي; Arabic: زين العابدين بن محمد بن علي المحلاتي ) was an eminent Persian calligrapher who was active in the period around the 1870s. He lived in Mahallat, under the Qajari Persia. He produced several gold illuminated Korans and Tafsir books.
