= Himuro Shrine =

Shinto shrine in Nara Prefecture, Japan

Himuro Shrine (氷室神社)
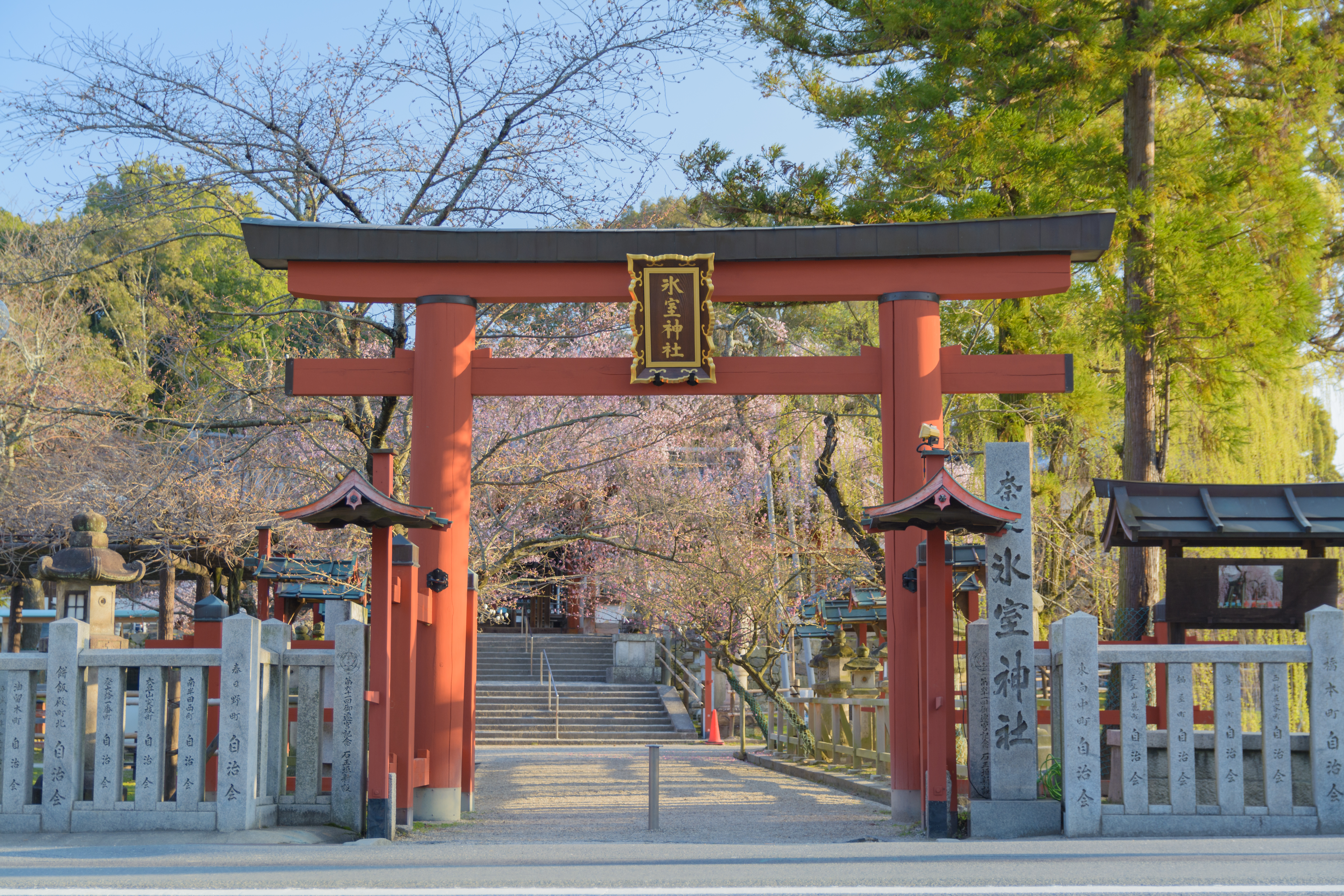
- The torii of Himuro Jinja

- Location within Japan

Religion
- Affiliation: Shinto
- Deity: Tsugenoinagi oyamanushi no mikoto

Location
- Coordinates: 34°41′04″N 135°50′16″E

Himuro Shrine (氷室神社, Himuro Jinja) is a Shinto shrine in Nara, Nara Prefecture, Japan. It was established in 710. Kami enshrined here include Tsugenoinagi oyamanushi no mikoto, Emperor Nintoku and Nukata no Onakatsuhiko no Mikoto (額田大仲彦命). The shrine's main festival is held annually on October 1. Tsugenoinagi oyamanushi no mikoto was a folk figure said to have invited a way to preserve ice. Prince Nukata no Onakatsuhiko no Mikoto, a brother of Emperor Nitoku, met with Tsugenoinagi oyamanushi no mikoto and brought the method to preserve ice to the Emperor.

== Gallery ==
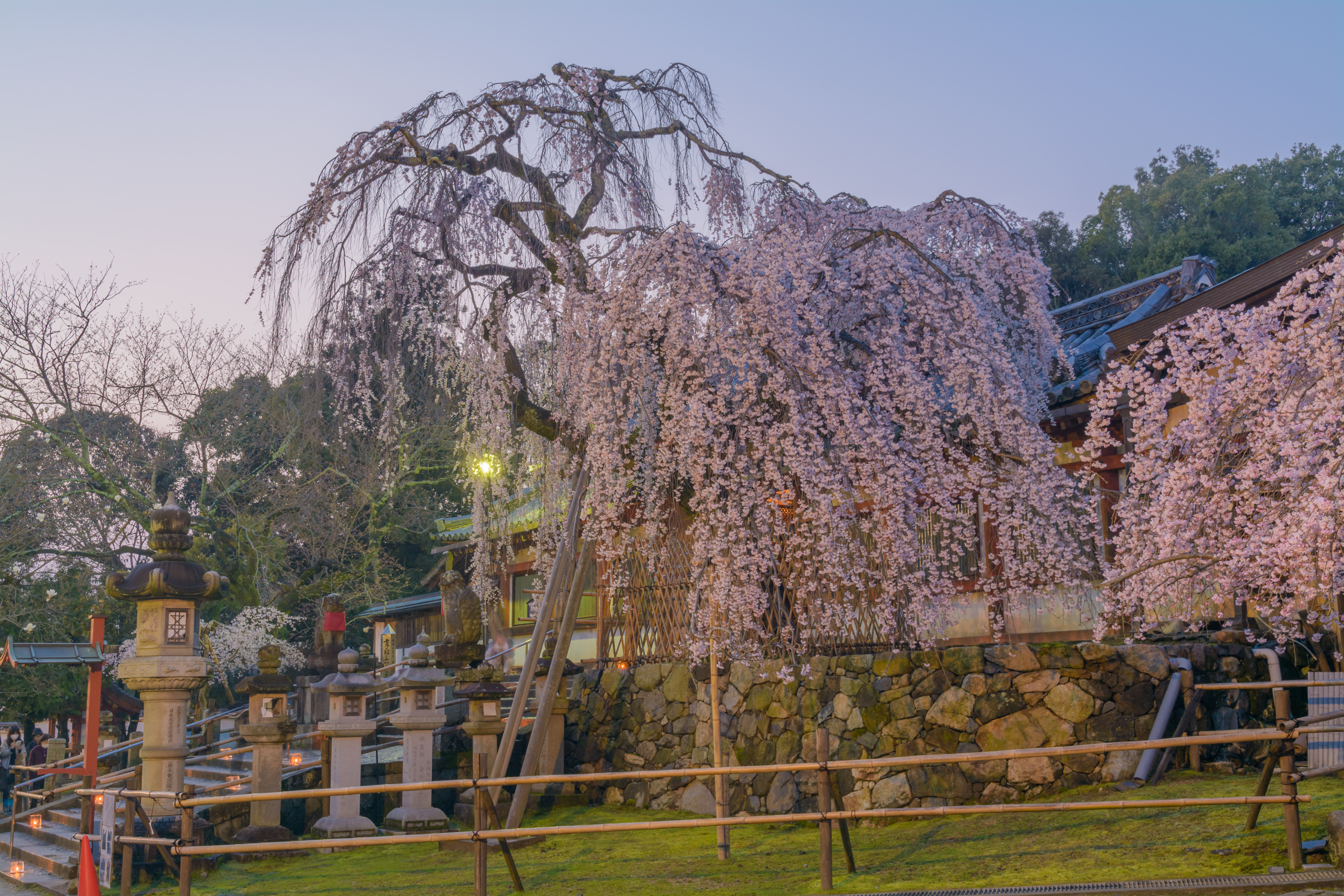
Weeping cherry tree in Himuro jinja

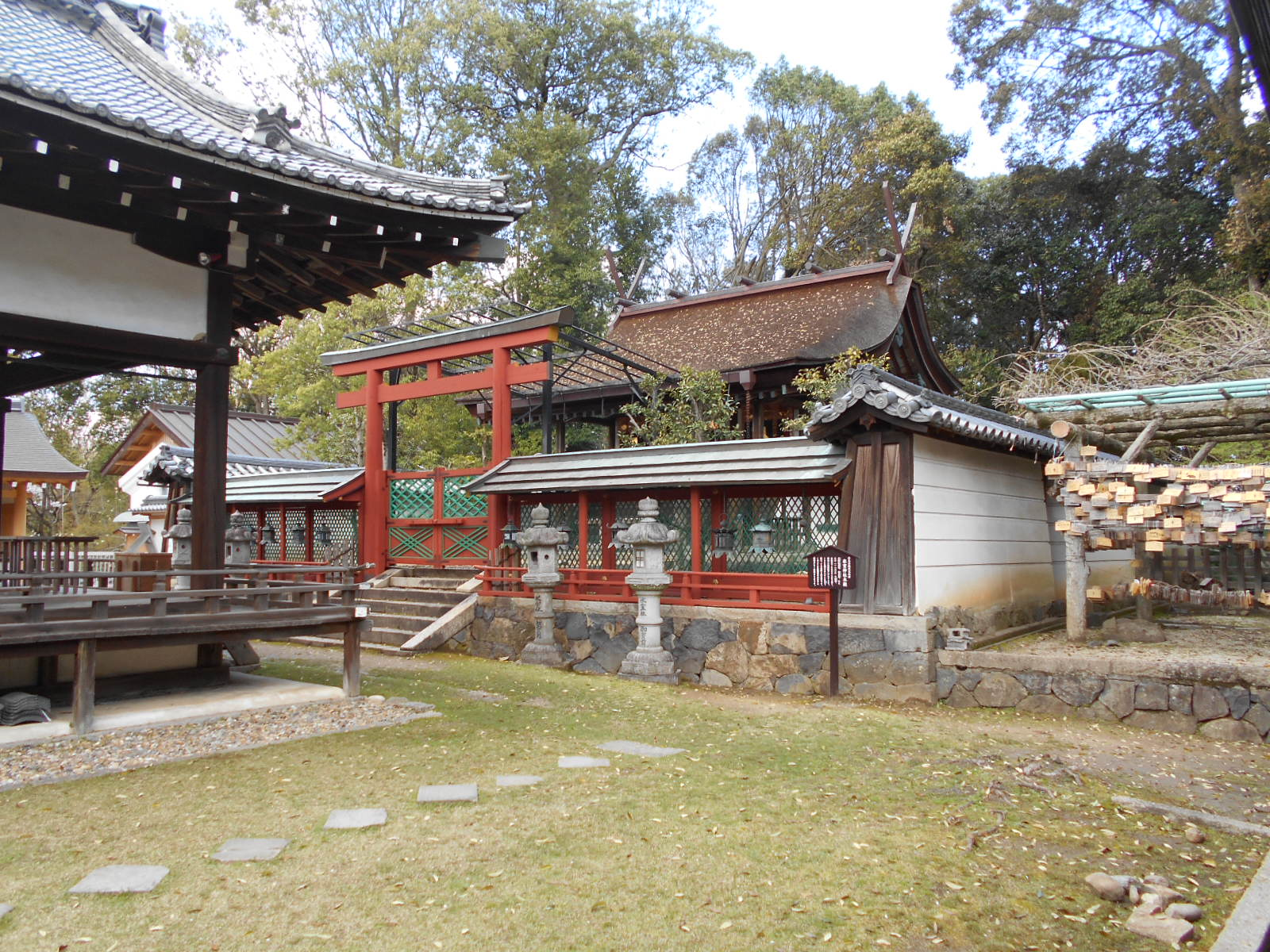
Main shrine
