= Calligraphy Museum of Iran =

Museum in Tehran, Iran

- موزه خوشنویسی ایران
- Established: 19 August 2017
- Location: Shariati st., Tehran, Iran
- Coordinates: 35.7038381°N 51.4324667°E
- Type: Art museum
- Collection size: 200
- Director: Shahab Shakiba
- Owner: Municipality of Tehran

Calligraphy Museum of Iran (Persian: موزه خوشنویسی ایران) is an art museum in Tehran. It opened on 19 August 2017. The museum has about 200 works on public display, which include calligraphy pieces, manuscripts, calligraphy tools and other objects related to the art of calligraphy. The historical period of the artworks covers from the third hijri century to the beginning of the Pahlavi era.

== History ==
The museum is located in the former mansion of politician Gholamreza Fuladvand.

== Collections ==
A number of items in the collection came from the personal collection of Iranian calligrapher Abdollah Foradi.
