= Persian calligraphy =

Writing art of the Persian language

Persian calligraphy or Iranian calligraphy (Persian: خوشنِویسیِ ایرانی, romanized: Xošnevisi-ye Irani) is the calligraphy of the Persian language. It is one of the most revered arts throughout the history of Iran.

== History ==
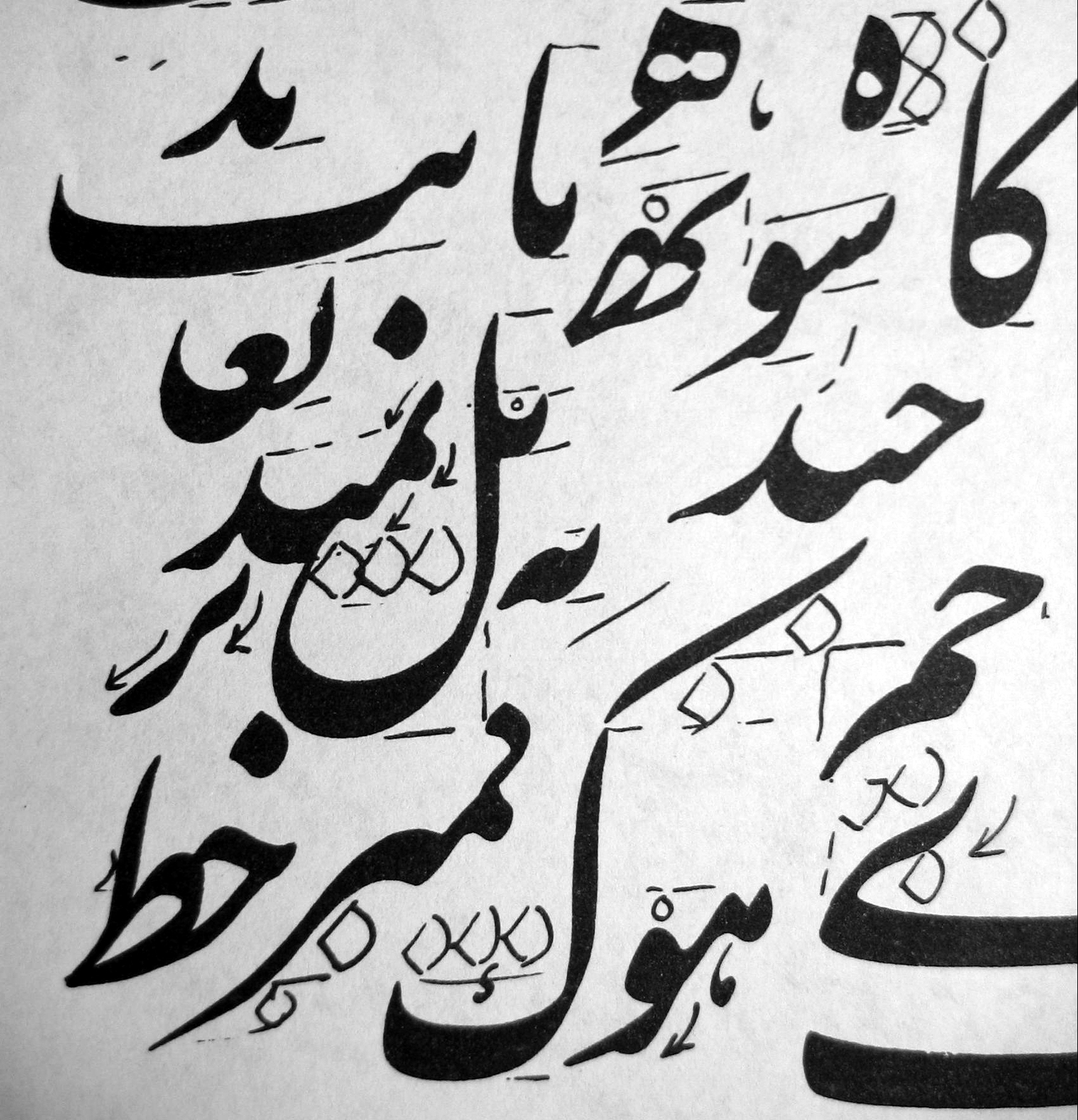
Example showing Nastaʿlīq's proportion rules.

After the introduction of Islam in the 7th century, Persians adapted the Arabic alphabet to Persian and developed the contemporary Persian alphabet. The Arabic alphabet has 28 characters. An additional four letters were added by Iranians, which resulted in the 32 letters currently present in the Persian alphabet.

Around one thousand years ago, Ibn Muqlah (Persian: ابنِ مقله بيضاوی شيرازی) and his brother created six genres of Arabic calligraphy, namely "Mohaqiq", "Reyhan", "Sols", "Naskh", "Toqi" and "Reqa". These genres were common for four centuries in Persia. In the 7th century (Hijri calendar), Hassan Farsi Kateb combined the "Naskh" and "Reqa" styles and invented a new genre of Persian calligraphy named "Ta'liq". In the 14th century, Mir Ali Tabrizi combined two major scripts of his time, i.e. Naskh and Taliq, and created a new Persian calligraphic style called "Nas’taliq". In the past 500 years Nastaʿlīq (also anglicized as Nastaleeq; Persian: نستعلیق nastaʿlīq) has been the predominant style for writing the Perso-Arabic script.Persian calligraphic traditions, particularly naskh and nastaʿlīq, also influenced the development of Persian typography, as printers and type designers adapted handwritten forms to movable type, lithography, mechanised typesetting, and later digital type.

In the 17th century Morteza Gholi Khan Shamlou and Mohammad Shafi Heravi created a new genre called cursive Nastaʿlīq Shekasteh Nastaʿlīq (Persian: شکسته نستعلیق)). Almost a century later, Abdol-Majid Taleqani, who was a prominent artist at the time, brought this genre to its highest level. This calligraphic style is based on the same rules as Nas’taliq. However, cursive Nas’taliq has a few significant differences: it provides more flexible movements, and it is slightly more stretched and curved. Yadollah Kaboli is one of the most prominent contemporary calligraphers within this style.

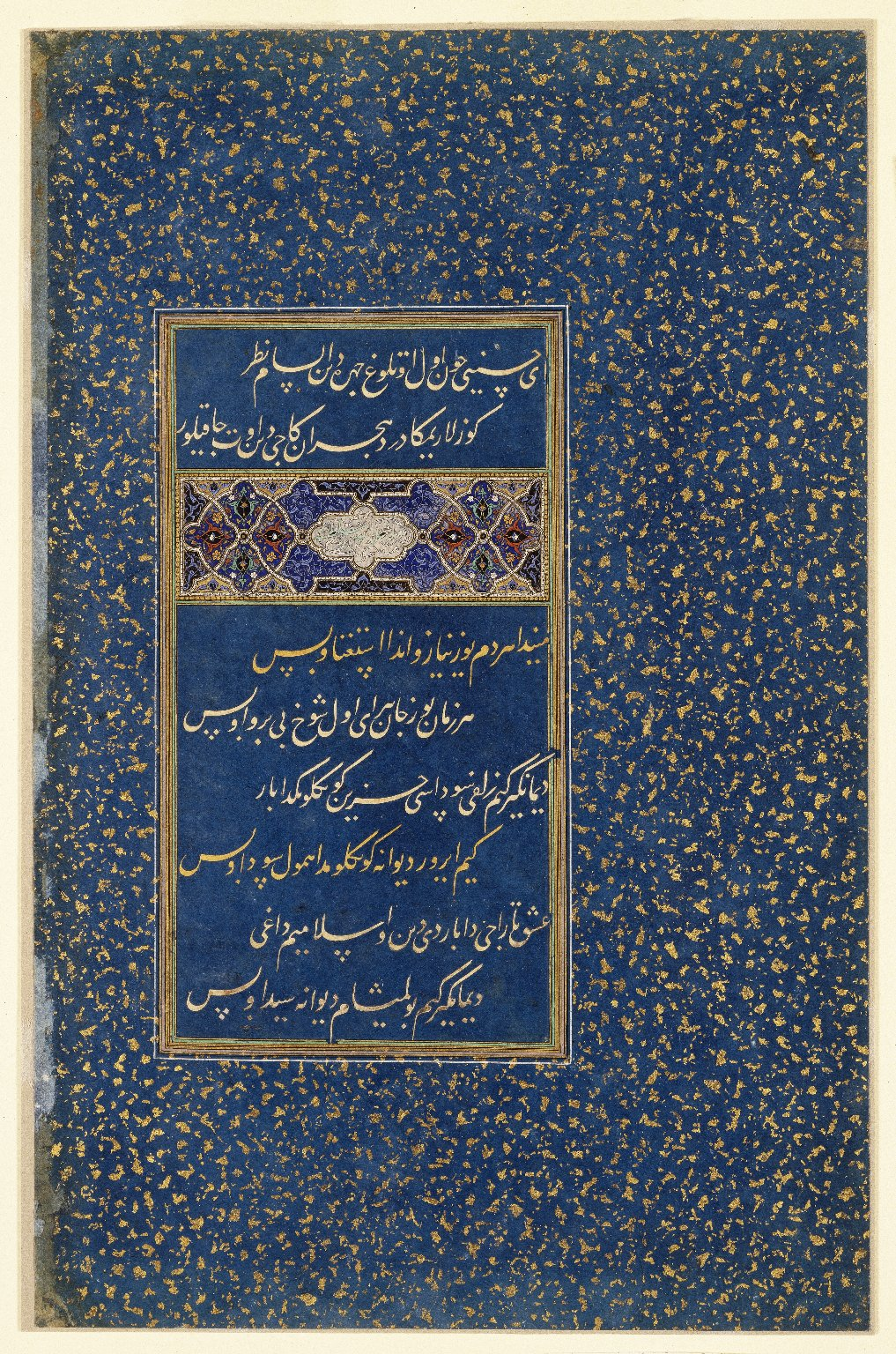
Folio of Poetry From the Divan of Sultan Husayn Mirza, c. 1490. Brooklyn Museum.

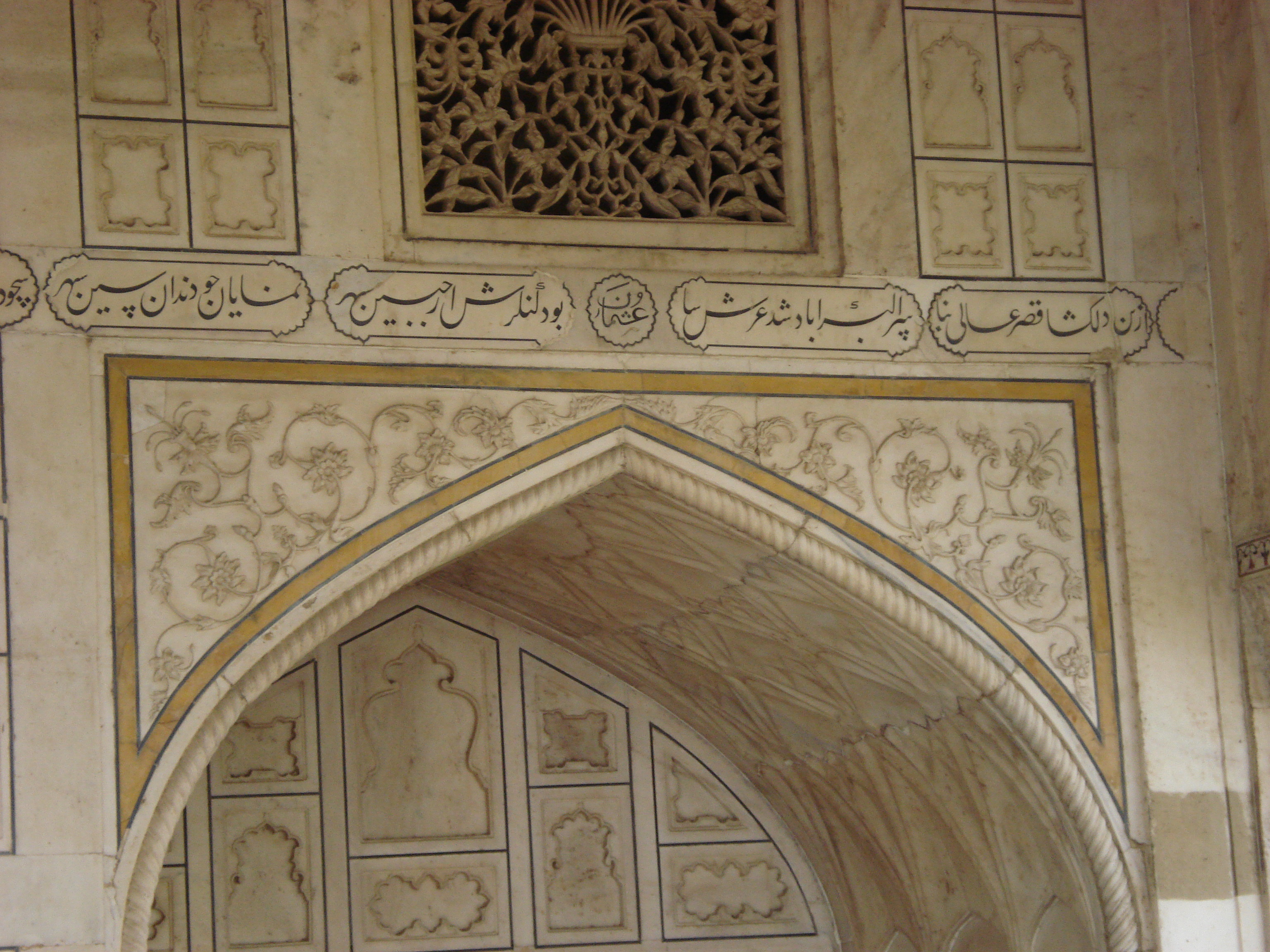
Calligraphy of Persian poems on large pishtaq at the Agra Fort, India

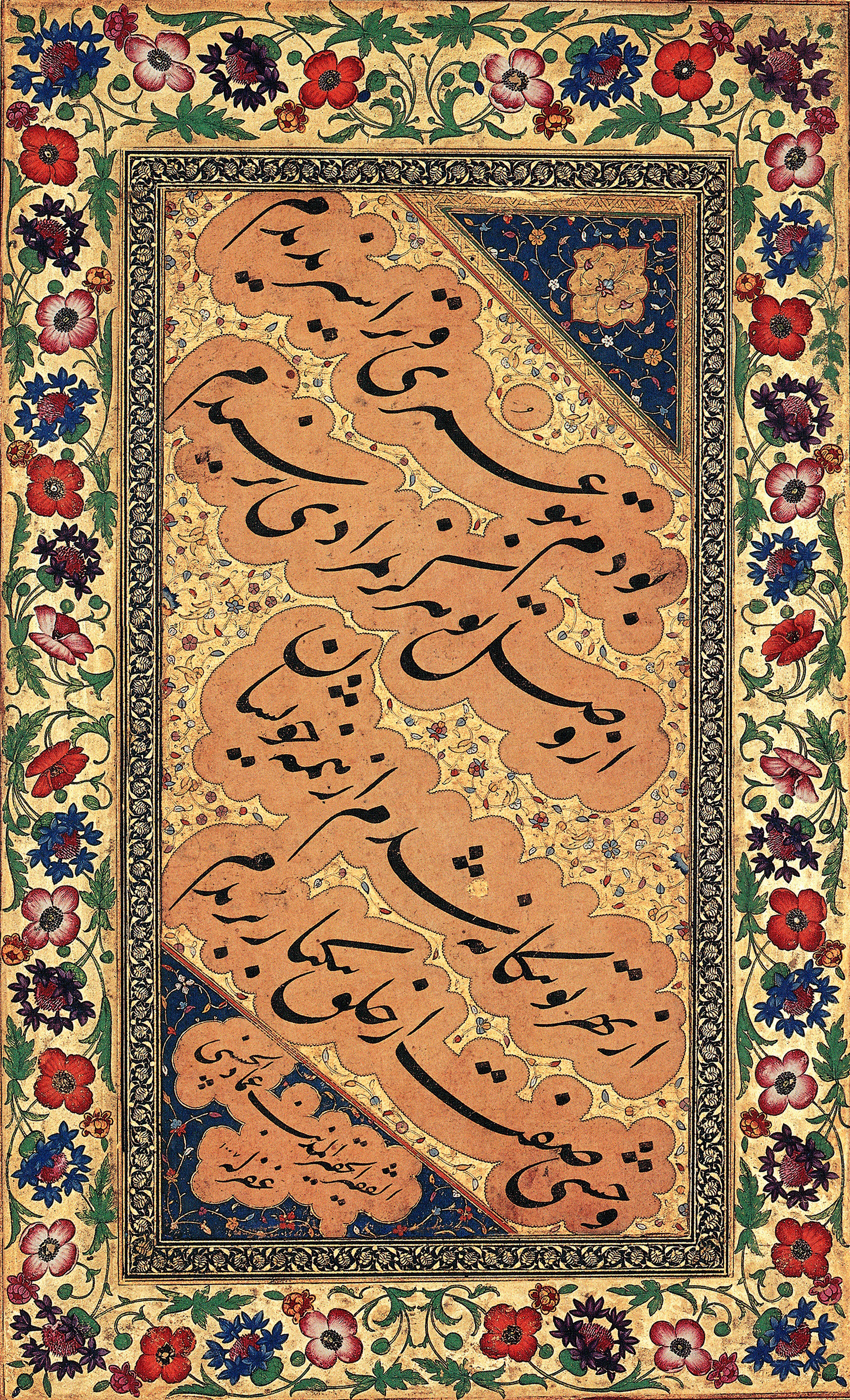
Chalipa panel, Mir Emad.

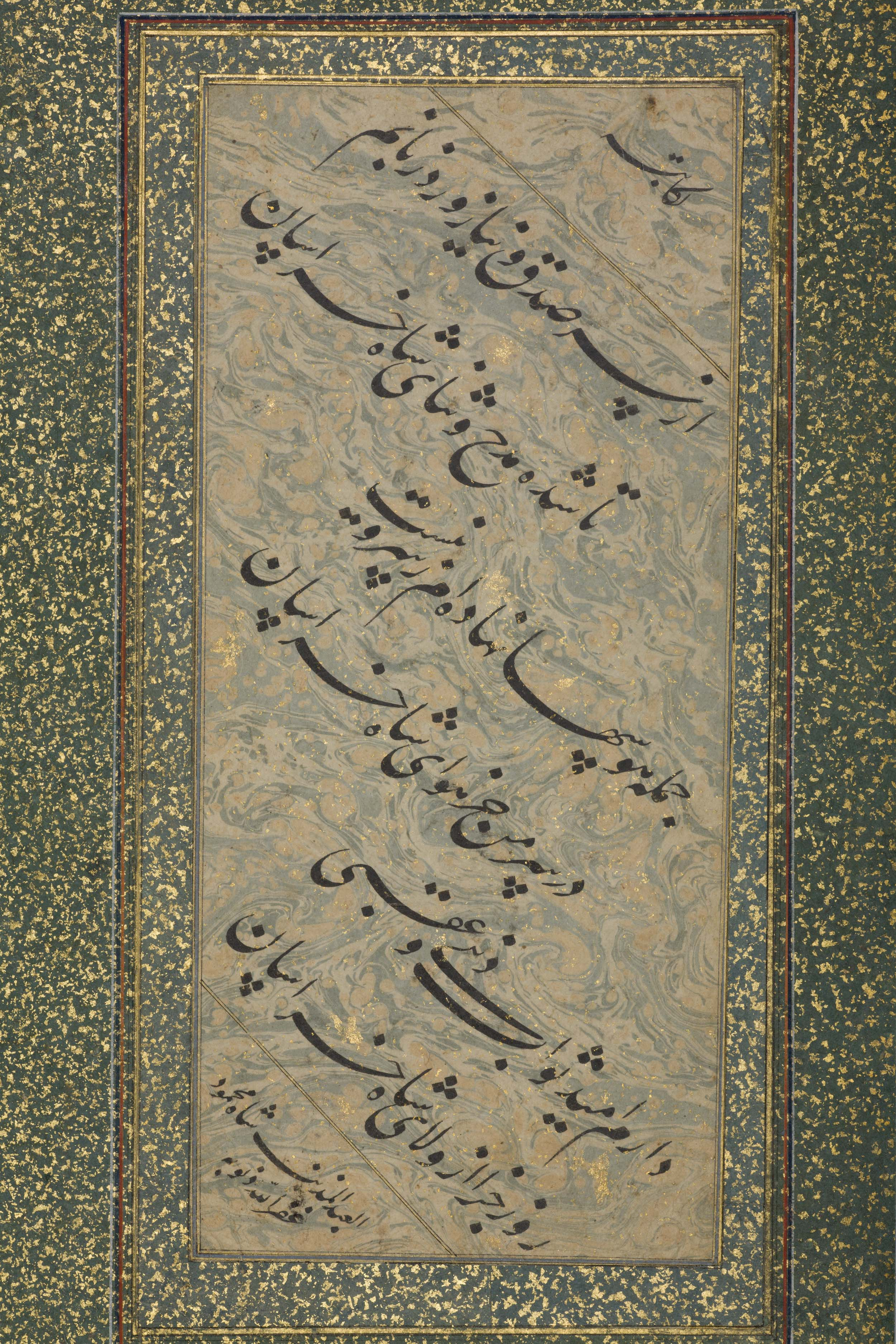
Calligraphic composition by Shah Mahmud Nishapuri, a 16th-century master of Nasta'liq

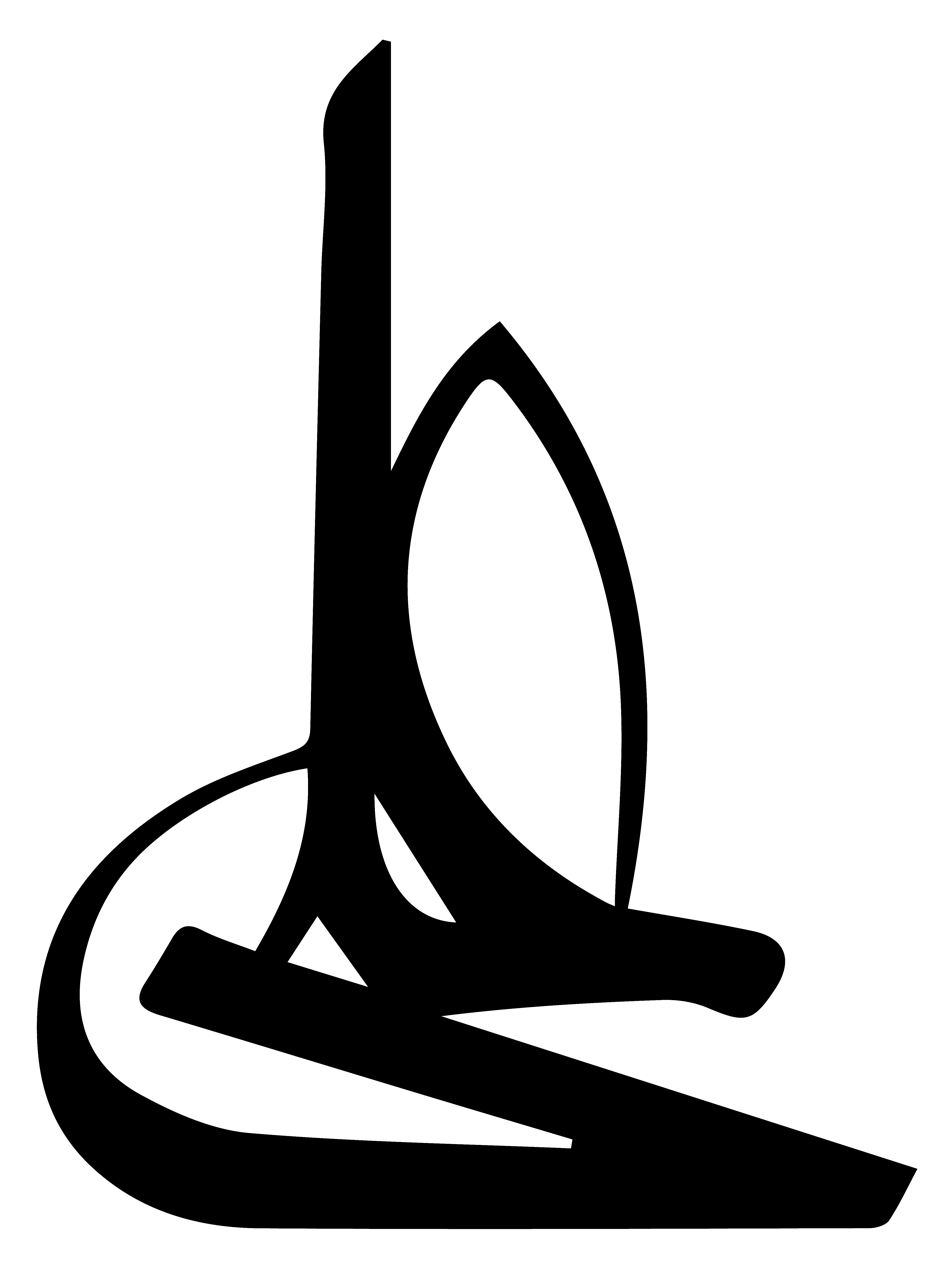
Calligraphy of the name Ali in the Moalla script.

== Contemporary Persian calligraphy ==
In 1950, the Iranian Calligraphers Association was founded by Mehdi Bayani, and early members included Hossein Mirkhani, Ali Akbar Kaveh, and Ebrahim Bouzari.

=== Modernist movement ===
The artists Zenderoudi, Jalil Rasouli, Sadegh Barirani, Faramarz Pilaram, Mohammad Ehsasi, and Parviz Tanavoli have used Persian calligraphy.

=== Post modernism ===
Abol Atighetchi uses combination of colored naskh, suluth and kufic style calligraphy with large letters in a single large format acrylic painting for his work presentation and circles in gold leaf or simple color to decorate but in the Nasta’liq style many colorful geometrical forms and lines are used to modernize the painting and the same technique is used to modernize the large format birds of bessmel (Persian: مرغ بسمل), all drawn with large letters. This style of work can be classified as post-modern.

=== Genres ===
- Nasta'liq script
- Shekasteh Nastaʿlīq (cursive Nasta'liq)
- Naghashi-khat (painting and calligraphy combined)

== Notable figures ==
- Mir Ali Tabrizi
- Mir Emad
- Gholam Hossein Amirkhani

== See also ==
- Calligraphy
- Islamic calligraphy
- List of Persian calligraphers
