= Keikhosro Khoroush =

Iranian painter and calligrapher (born 1941)

- کیخسرو خروش
- Keikhosro Khoroush, 76 years old.
- Born: 23 April 1941 (age 85); Tehran, Imperial State of Iran
- Education: University of Tehran
- Known for: Iranian calligrapher and painter
- Style: Nastaligh calligraphy | Realist painter
- Spouse: Azam (zahra) Aminian
- Website: khoroush.art

Keikhosro Khoroush (Persian: کیخسرو خروش; born 1941) is an Iranian painter and calligrapher.

== Biography ==
Khoroush was born in April 1941 in Tehran, Iran.

He enrolled at the Iran Calligraphers Association. He got started learning Persian calligraphy under the supervision of Great Master Hossein Mirkhani (the Founder of Iran Calligraphers Association)

In 1973, he got a master's degree and was successful in taking great master degree of Iranian Calligraphy Association in 1977. Finally, he became one of the two great masters in Persian calligraphy since this time and has calligraphied up to 40 books since the 1960s.

Over more than 1000 of his paintings and several art works of his calligraphy (uncountable), are available in Iran and abroad (in museums and personal collections), and sold in auctions like Tehran auction.

He received a lifetime achievement award at the Calligraphy Museum of Iran in Tehran.

== Works ==
He is a contemporary artist and has been artistically active in the past 60 years, Almost all his paintings are based on oil and watercolor.

== Books list ==
- Layla and Majnun - Poetry by Nizami Ganjavi (Published – 1980s).
- Masnavi-e-Mush-O-Gorbeh (Mouse and Cat) by Obeid Zakani, (unpublished – 1960s).
