= Yadollah Kaboli Khansari =

Iranian calligrapher (b. 1949)

Yadollah Kaboli Khansari (Persian: یدالله کابلی خوانساری; born 1949) is a calligrapher from Khansar, Iran. He is a member of the board of The Trustees of the Society of Iranian Calligraphists and also holds a First Degree art Certificate.

== Published books ==
- 1982 Broken Script and How to read it
- 1986 Sense Qalam, A Guidebook on the Broken Script
- 1989 Mehrab Khial, a collection of choice works
- 1990 Kelk Sheidaei Crosswise style in Broken Script.
- 1990 Bagh Nazar collection of choice works Broken Script.
- 1992 Quatrains of Baba Taher
- 1994 Naghsh Shough, collection of choice works
- 1995 Monhanie Eshg (collection of choice works)
- 1997 Dowlat-e-Ghoran (collection National Exhibition)

== International exhibitions ==
- 1975 British Exhibition (London)
- 1984 Pakistan exhibition (Islamabad-Karachi- Lahour)
- 1988 International commemoration of Hales Shirazi, France, Paris.
- 1991-2 Iranology Exhibition at Columbia University. (New York)
- 1992 Iranian Art Exhibition U.A.E.(Dubai-abo Dhab.)
- 1993 Exhibition in France (Paris)
- 1996 Italy Rome in the Iran House in FAQ.
- 1997 Exhibition in Turkmenistsn
- 1997 Exhibition in USA
- 1998 Exhibition Spain Madrid
- 2001 Exhibition in USA
