= Jalil Rasouli =

Iranian artist and Persian calligrapher

- جلیل رسولی
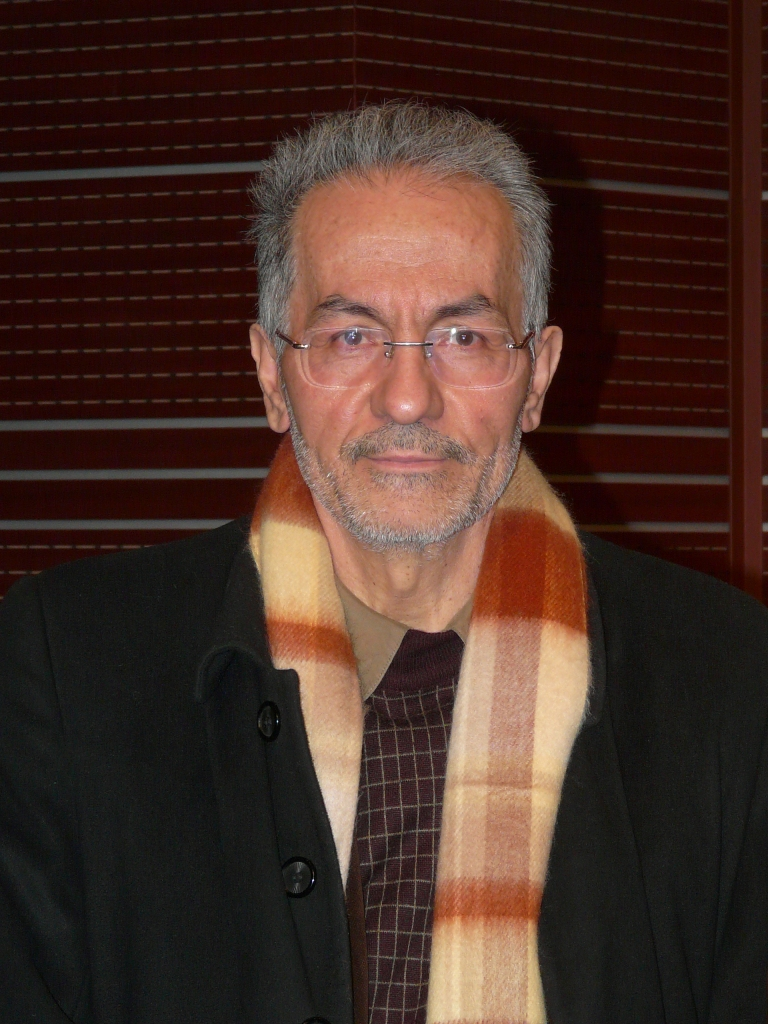
- Born: Mohammad Jalil Rasouli; September 27, 1947 (age 78); Hamedan, Iran
- Known for: Persian Calligraphy

Jalil Rasouli (née: Mohammad Jalil Rasouli) (b.1947 in Hamedan; Persian: جلیل رسولی) is a notable Iranian artist and Persian calligrapher.

He is one of the pioneering figures in modernist movement of Persian calligraphy.

== See also ==
- Persian art
