= ESDi School of Design =

Design school in Sabadell, Spain

Coordinates: 41.54343°N 2.11653°E

ESDI School of Design
- Escola Superior de Disseny ESDI
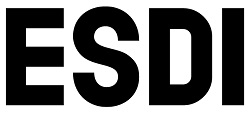
- Type: University Affiliated School
- Established: 1989
- Director: Georgina Bombardó Codinach
- Academic staff: 100
- Administrative staff: 48
- Students: 700
- Undergraduates: Undergraduate Degree in Design
- Postgraduates: Masters and Ph.D
- Location: Sabadell (Barcelona), Spain
- Website: www.esdi.es

ESDI School of Design (Escola Superior de Disseny ESDI) is one of the schools of Ramon Llull University. It's located in Sabadell (Barcelona). It offers the Official Undergraduate Degree in Design in the following specialisations: Graphic Design, Fashion Design, Product Design, Interior Design and Audiovisual Design. They also teach Management Design which is part of an own specialisation called Integrated Multidisciplinary Design. The Textile Design Foundation (FUNDIT), whose CEO is Georgina Bombardó Codinach, is the founding institution of ESDI.

ESDI has over thirty years of history. It was the first school that introduced Spanish university studies in design, as a title owned by URL, and was one of the first colleges to provide the Spanish Official Undergraduate University Degree in Design in 2008. Its mission is to research, which can be proved as ESDI was the organizer of the First International Congress of Design and Innovation in Catalonia in 2010.

== Birth ==
The School of Design ESDI has its origins in The Textile Design Foundation (FUNDIT) that was born in 1989 on the initiative of a group of companies associated with the Union of Manufacturers from Sabadell (called in Spain Gremi de Fabricants de Sabadell). They pointed out design as a key element in improving competitiveness and growth of the industry.

They realized they needed to compete "with value" in its products instead of competing for price and that the challenge was going to happen for the textile industry was to have textile designers capable to use analytical skills and with the ability to work in the creation process with all the people involved in the generation of product value, so that competition was not only a matter of using the best technology. The initiative to create ESDI had the support of Catalan and Spanish authorities.

This way, the Foundation created The School of Design ESDI, placing it in the old Docks de Sabadell, who were serving a large industrial warehouse for the deposit of the batches of raw wool and textile. The building was then remodeled in 1991 by architect Ignasi Veciana. Today, that place is a campus with a main building of 9,000 m2, distributed over four floors and numerous scientific, technical and artistic equipment necessary to ensure the full development of academic activity.

== Evolution ==
ESDI began teaching in the specialisation of the textile design, a studies that were then specially requested by the Spanish textile sector. The Textile Design Foundation (FUNDIT) has always believed that industry requires highly skilled designers proficient in the creative process and having the ability to work symbiotically with all actors involved in the progress and value creation in a context of global competition. ESDI has also been committed since their origins with the culture of entrepreneurship and the continuous birth of new companies, because they understand that there is no progress coming with risk, and this is a value that is communicated to all students from first day the academic activity begins.

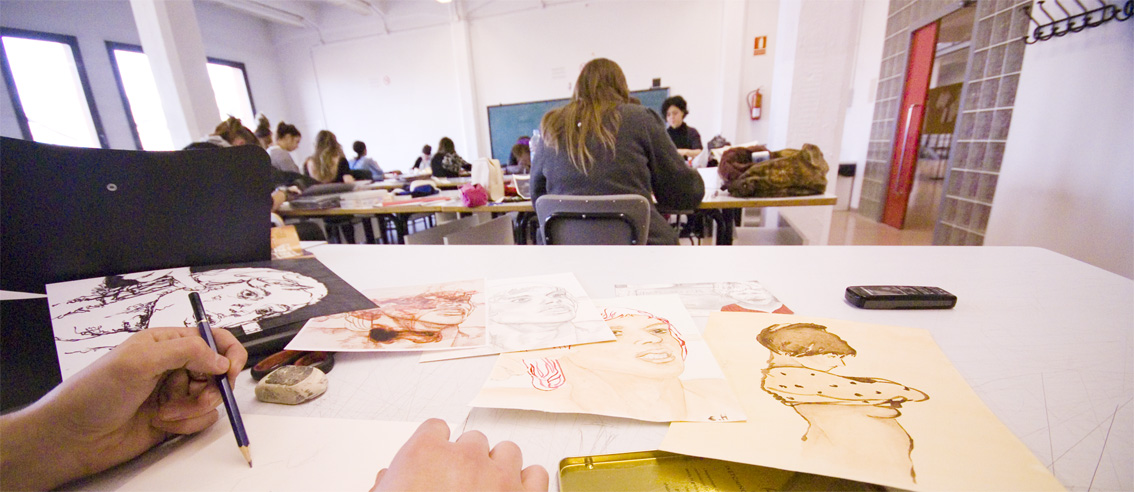

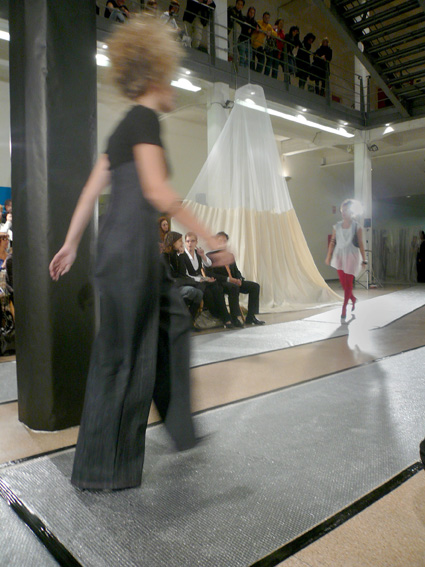

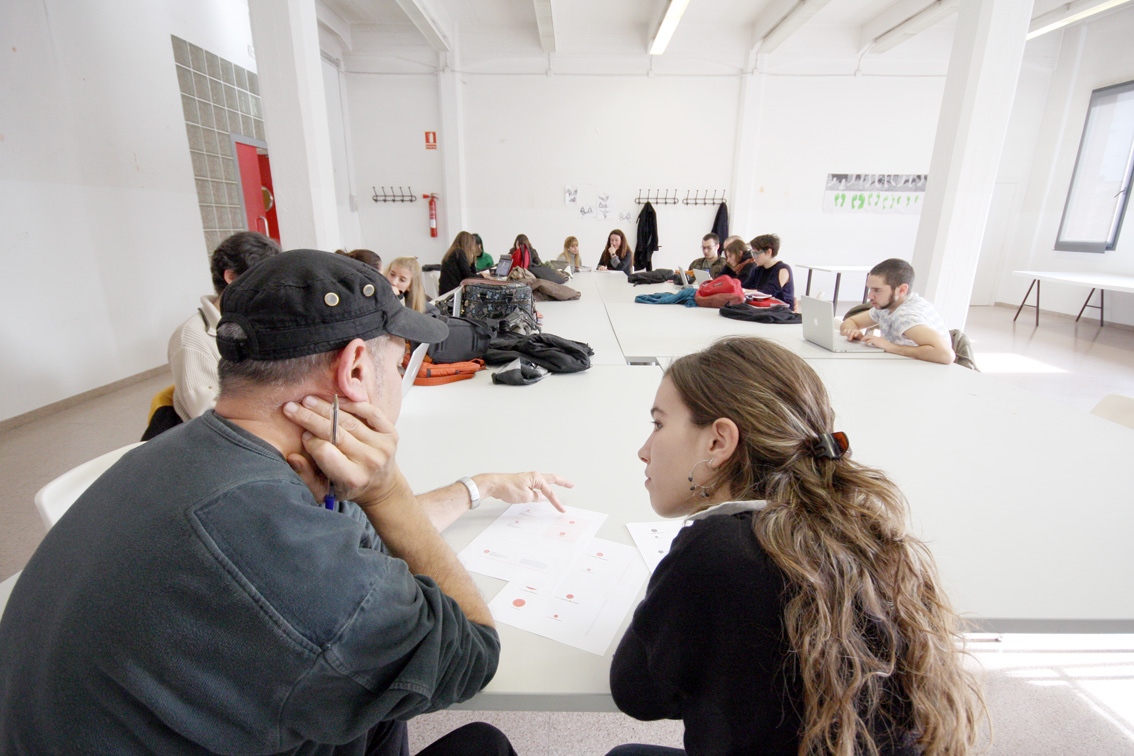

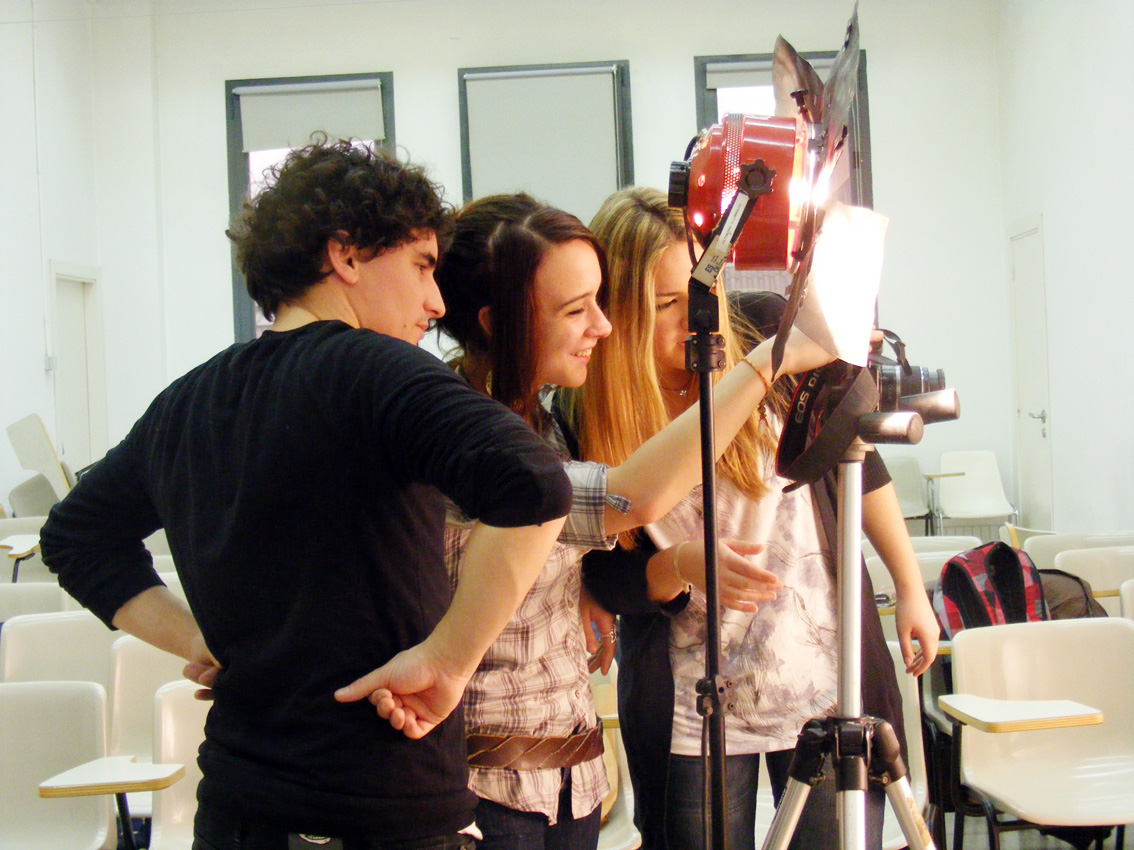

Three years after its birth, in 1992, the school of design (ESDI) got associated with the Ramon Llull University (URL), so that the ESDI fit their education system to the academic requirements and quality assurance from university, and signed an agreement with the Ramon Llull University. This allowed thereafter ESDi undergraduate students would receive from the Ramon Llull University and own title by the university according to the different specialisations. This was the first step, the first boost to fit design to a model of official university degree which would not come until some years later. By then ESDI became already the first center in Spain to teach university studies in design.

Reaffirming the commitment to creativity and the evolution of technology and society, the school of design (ESDI) created the Media Center of Art and Design (MECAD) in 1998 and began teaching a new specialisation: electronic art and digital design, nowadays called audiovisual design.

In 2000 The Textile Design Foundation (FUNDIT) acquired and joined the Arts and Fashion Techniques School of Barcelona (EATM), the first school in Spain in the teaching of fashion. Founded in Barcelona in 1968, it is a Spanish school of design in the teaching of this specialty. The EATM has over 40 years. It offers a wide range of master's and postgraduate degrees. It is important to point out the Official Master in New Media Art Curatorship: one of the first studies with a Ph.D. design research in Spain.

In 2001-2002, the school of design added a new specialisation to their programme: interior design, an itinerary that includes the new requirements for mobility, remote work and multiculturalism, among other things, that characterize the organizing of the new society. In 2005-2006, ESDi incorporated a new specialisation: integrated multidisciplinary design. This is because an effort made to suit the design studies to socio-cultural changes and the new requirements coming from developments in society.

The labor market requires a design manager, a professional with knowledge and a wide perspective of this discipline that, being part of a company, must be able to add them value by the implementation of design in their different areas (product, communication, human resources).

== Consolidation and recognition ==
On 9 January 2009 is the date on which the Government of Catalonia, through the Order IUE/9/2009, officially recognized the ESDI's affiliation with the Ramon Llull University (URL) in Barcelona and, in turn, recognizes the implementation of the official university studies in design. So, the 2008–2009 academic year was the first in which ESDi started offering the Official Undergraduate University Degree in Design. The design was finally an official university degree.

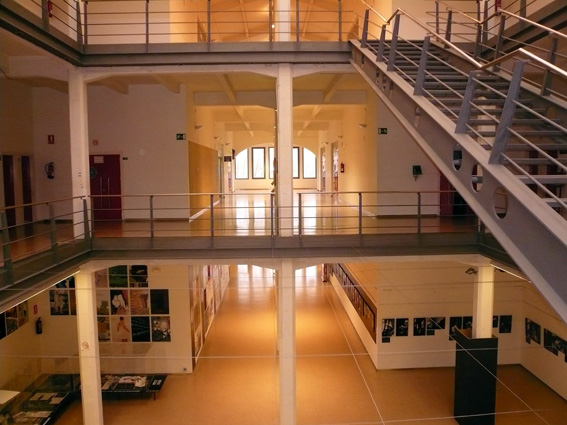

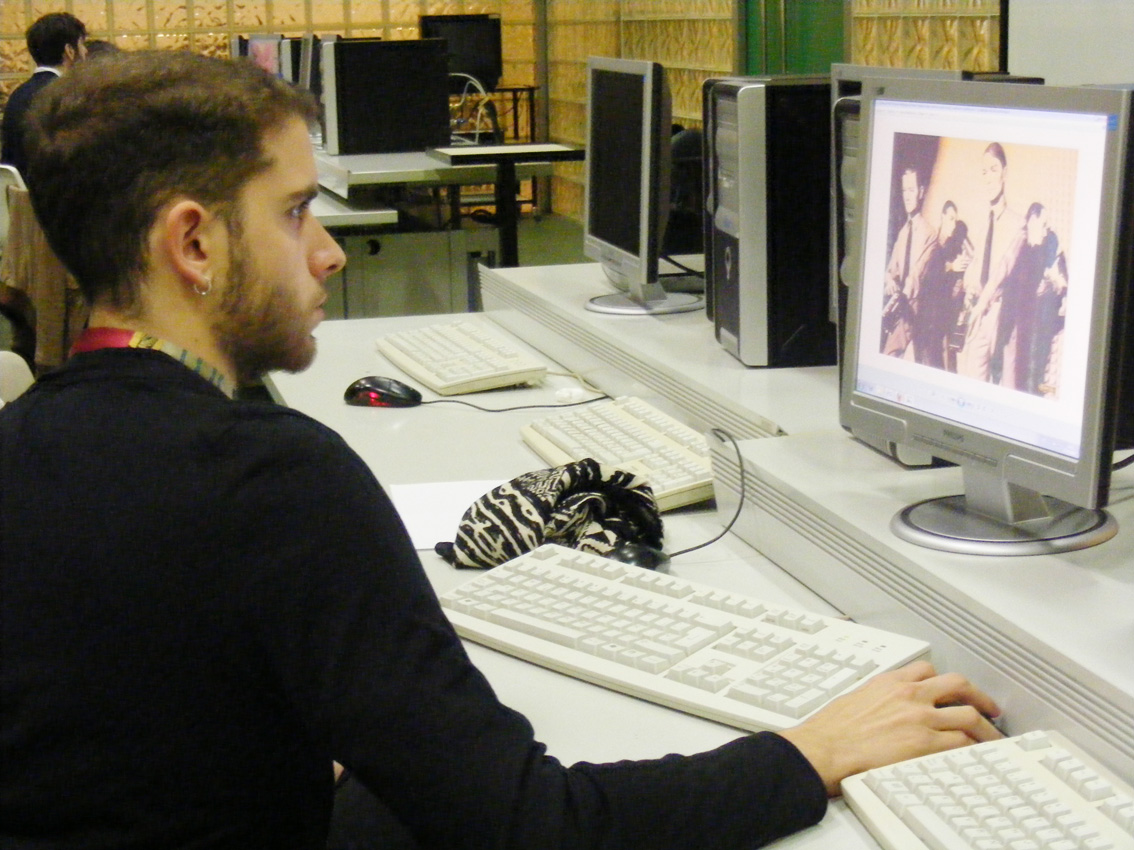

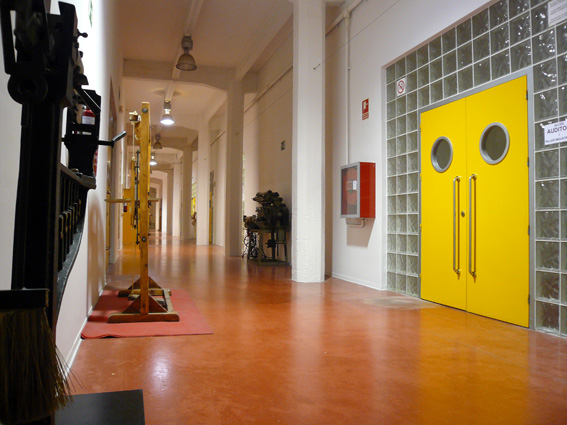

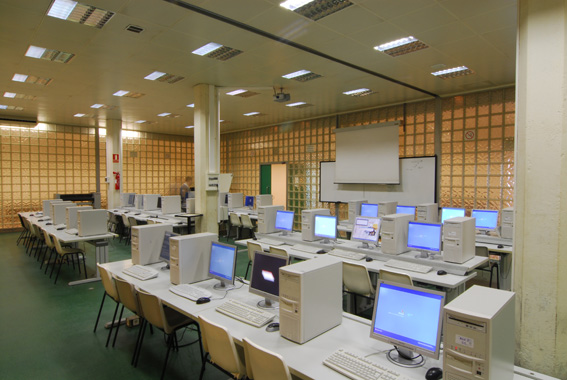

One year later, 2010, ESDI celebrates their 20 years old with the organization of a Congress that was the first in Catalonia related to Design and Innovation. Many renowned professionals from several countries attended and presented papers related to research design and business competitiveness.

The last step concluding with the integration of the discipline of design for all purposes at the university occurs in 2011. ESDI begins to teach the Master in New Media Art Curatorship: one of the first studies with a Ph.D design research in Spain, which incorporates a research path that opens the doors to access the a PH.D programme in design. After a long road design has fully recognized in Catalan universities. University degree in design is officially recognized by the European Union and it is widely seen as a crucial factor for improving competitiveness in the world of business.
