= Gholam Hossein Amirkhani =

Persian calligrapher (born 1939)

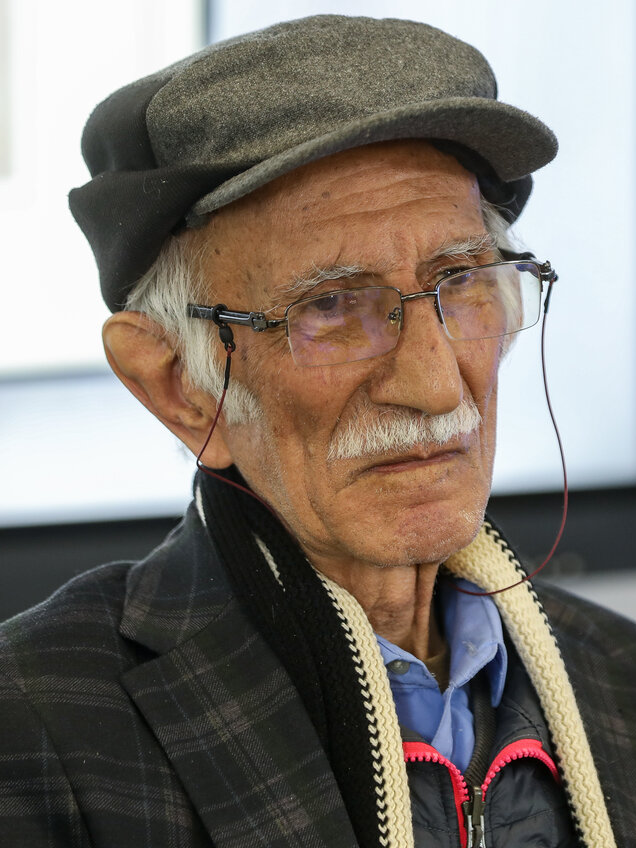
Gholam-Hossein Amirkhani in 2024

Gholam Hossein Amirkhani (استاد غلامحسین امیرخانی) is an Iranian calligrapher in Nastaliq style, born in 1939 in Taleghan, Iran. He is the chief of Iran calligraphers council, which established in 1950. He became a member of the Iran Calligraphers Association in 1965 and was named as the master of Iranian calligraphy in 1979. In 2014, he held his first solo exhibition in 15 years, showing his latest works in Tehran's Sareban Gallery.

In 2017 he was awarded Legion of Honor.
