= Baba Shah Esfahani =

Baba Shah Isfahani بابا شاه اصفهانی
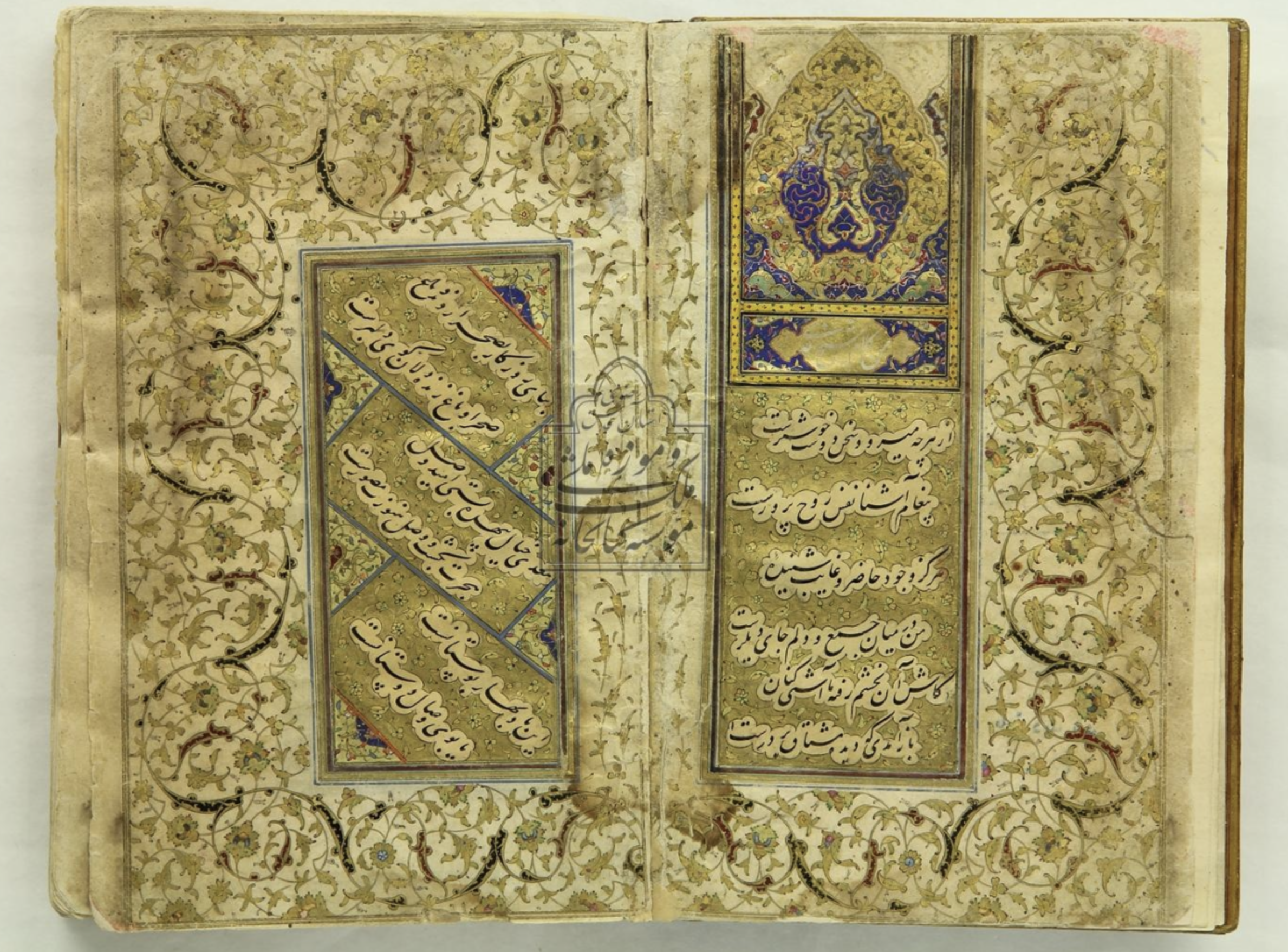
- Sheikh Muslih-Uddin Sa'di Shiraz, copied by Baba Shah Isfahani, placed at Malek National Library and Museum Institution, Tehran, Iran.
- Born: Isfahan, Iran
- Died: Baghdad, Iraq
- Known for: Calligraphy
- Notable work: The Spirit of Islamic Calligraphy: Ādāb al-mashq Benefits of Calligraphy
- Awards: Master of Masters; Reyis or-Roassa
- Patrons: Shah Tahmasp I

Baba Shah Isfahani (Persian: بابا شاه اصفهانی, Bābā Šāh Isfahāni), also known as Baba Shah Araghi (بابا شاه عراقی, Bābā Šāh Arāqi), was the most famous Iranian calligrapher in the 16th century and the most prominent calligrapher of Nastaliq script in the era of Tahmasp I. He was titled as Reyis or-Roassa. His calligraphy teacher was Ahmad Mashhadi. In 1588, when he was young, he travelled to Iraq. He was killed in Baghdad and was buried in the city. His works date back from 1569 until 1586.

== Early life ==
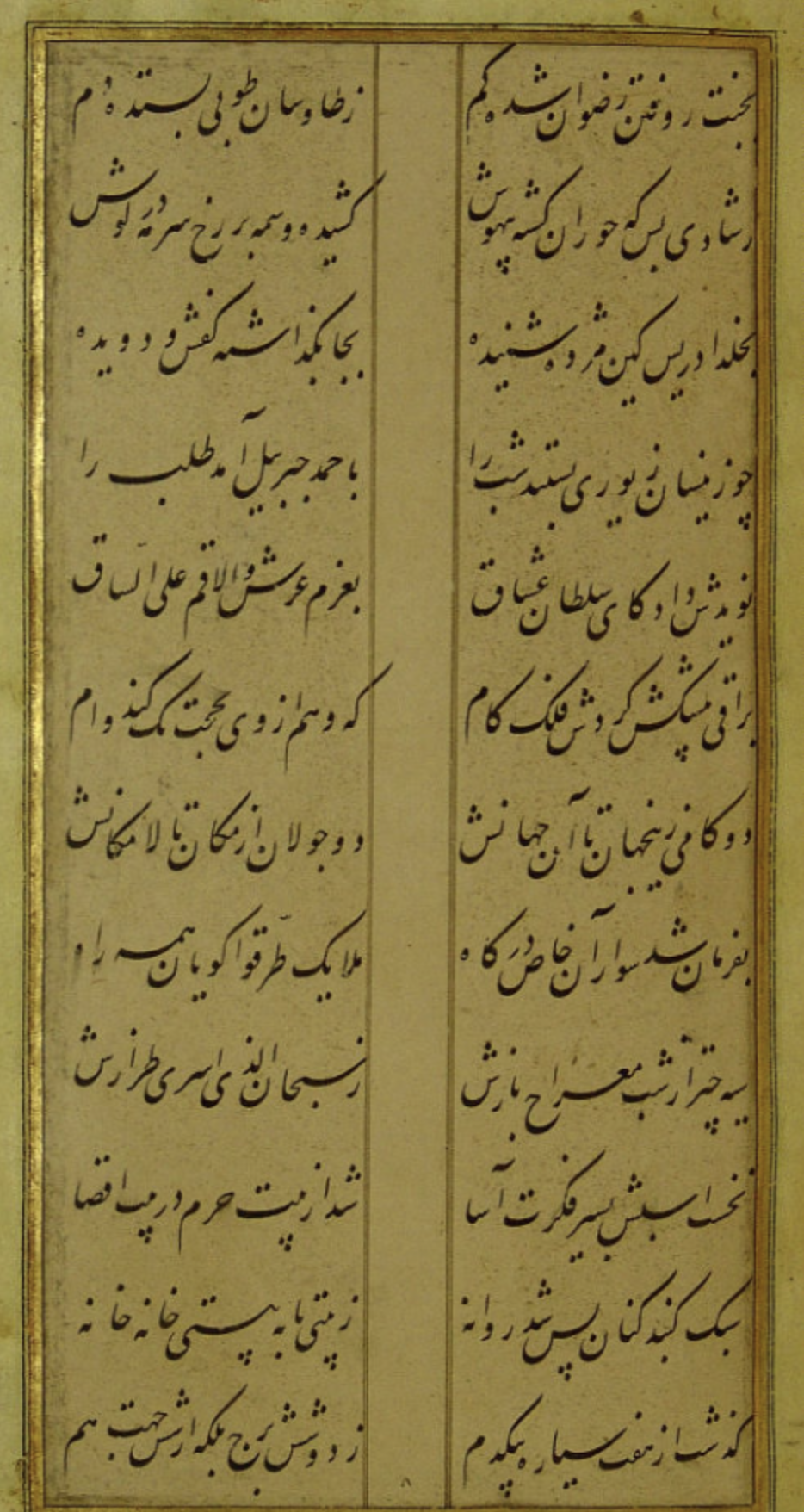
Amir Khosru Dehlavi's Masnavi-e Davalirani Khezar Khan, Copied by the master scribe Baba Shah al-Isfahani, Central Library of Astan Quds Razavi

On the report of some "modern authorities like the Turkish scholar Habib Effendi, Baba Shah Isfahani had begun the study of calligraphy from the age of eight, and studied night and day for eight years with the celebrated Mir 'Ali Haravi (d. 951/1544-45), who perfected the nasta'liq style in Herat and Bukhara. Habib Effendi further states that Mir Emad (d. 1012/1603), perhaps the most admired master of nastaliq, derived his style from Baba Shah. If correct, this information would put Baba Shah's birth at least sixteen years before Mir 'Ali's death, or no later than 940/1533-34. On the other hand, Muhammad Qutb al-Din Yazdi wrote that he had met Baba Shah Isfahani in 995/1586-87, when the latter was still a young man, and he was amazed to see that he already excelled most of the calligraphers of the day. Qutb al-Din said that if he had lived longer, Baba Shah would have surpassed Sultan 'Ali Mashhadi and Mir 'Ali Haravi, and to achieve so much he must have had a divine gift. This information obviously conflicts with the statement of Habib Effendi, according to whom Baba Shah would have been over fifty at the very time when Qutb al-DIn commented on his youth; Qutb al-Din's statement also implies that Baba Shah died young, before realizing his full potential. Following the researches of the modern Iranian scholar Mehdi Bayani, we should accept the eyewitness account of Qutb al-Din, so that Baba Shah must have died in Baghdad in 996/1587-88; the modern attempt to link Baba Shah into the chain of the two greatest masters of nasta'liq cannot be demonstrated."
