= Mir Ali Heravi =

Persian calligrapher and calligraphy teacher

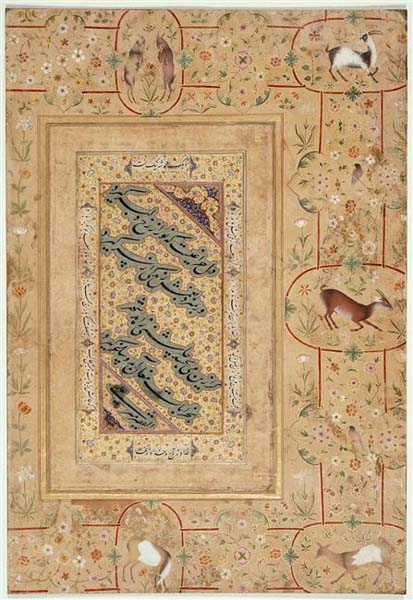
a Nastaʿlīq work by Mir Ali Heravi

Mir Ali Heravi (Persian: میرعلی هروی), also known as Mir Ali Hossein Heravi and Mir Jan, titled as Kateb-e Soltani, was a prominent Persian calligrapher and calligraphy teacher of Nastaʿlīq script in the 16th century. He was the second significant Persian calligrapher after Mir Emad. He had artistic influence on the later calligraphers.

== Biography ==
Mir Ali Heravi was from Herat. In 1506, he emigrated with his family to Mashhad, but after a short time they came back to Herat and stayed there. When he was young, he was a scrivener of orders and instructions for the governor of Herat. Then he started working as a calligrapher in the court of Sultan Husayn Mirza Bayqara. He became the King's favorite calligrapher and was titled as Kateb os-Soltan. He signed some of his works with Mir Ali al-Kateb os-Soltani. He lived in Herat until the death of Sultan Husayn Mirza Bayqara. After King's death, he lived sometimes in Mashhad and sometimes in Herat. In 1512, Ismail I captured Herat. In this time, Heravi became the protégé of Karim od-Din Habibollah Savoji. After Habibollah's murder, when Sam Mirza Safavi, the brother of Tahmasp I, was the governor of Khorasan, Mir Ali Heravi was in Herat for 3 years until 1528. In 1528, Obeid Khan captured Herat for a short time and took Mir Ali Heravi to Bukhara and appointed him as a scrivener and calligraphy teacher of his son, Abdolaziz Khan. Mir Ali Heravi lived 16 years in Bukhara. He was not allowed to leave the city. He died in 1544 in Bukhara.

Because of homesickness and obligatory emigration to Bukhara and being far from family, Heravi lived in this city under depression and sadness.

Heravi was Zein od-Din Mohammad's student. Zein od-Din Mohammad learned calligraphy himself from Soltan Ali Mashhadi.

== His students ==
Mir Ali Heravi had seven important students:

- Mir Mohammad Bagher, who was a calligrapher in the court of Abdul Rahim Khan-I-Khana, Humayun and Akbar.
- Khaje Mohammad Shabestari, the chief of Herat's police station.
- Ahmad Mashhadi, the scrivener and a companion of Tahmasp I.
- Mir Hossein Bokharaei
- Malek Deylami, Mir Emad's calligraphy teacher.
- Mir Heidar Bokharaei
- Mir Chalame
