= Mahmoud Shabestari =

Persian Sufi poet (1288–1340)

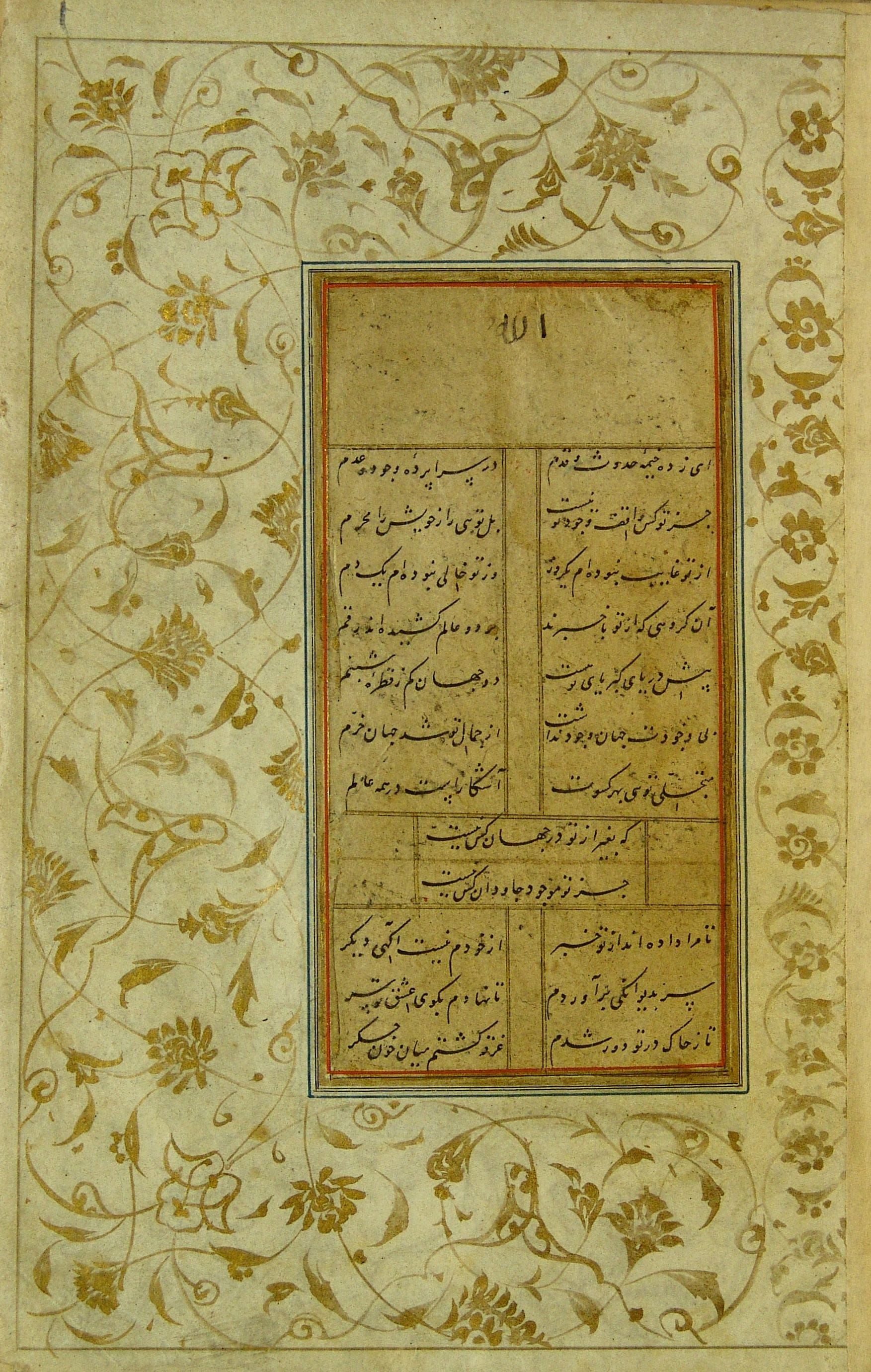
Page from manuscript of Gulshan-i Raz copied in nastaliq by Jafar Tabrizi (fl 1412–1431). Library of Astan Quds Razavi

Mahmoud Shabestari or Mahmūd Shabestarī (Persian: محمود شبستری; 1288–1340) is one of the most celebrated Persian Sufi poets of the 14th century.

== Life and work ==
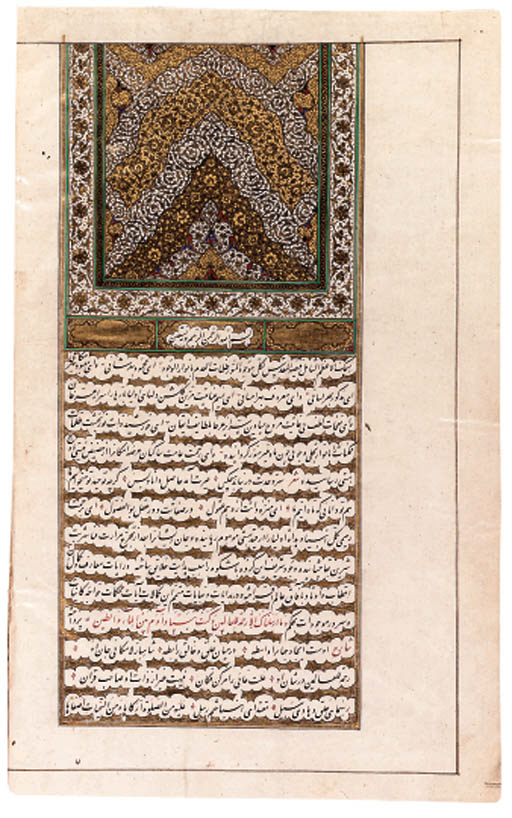
Manuscript of Muhammad ibn Yahya ibn 'Ali al-Gilani's (died 1505) commentary on Shabestari's Sharh-e gulshan-e-raz. Copy created in Qajar Iran, dated 20 May 1882

Shabestari was born in the town of Shabestar near Tabriz in 1288 (687 AH), where he received his education. He became deeply versed in the symbolic terminology of Ibn Arabi. He wrote during a period of Mongol invasions.

His most famous work is a mystic text called The Secret Rose Garden (Gulshan-i Rāz) written about 1311 in rhyming couplets (Mathnawi). This poem was written in response to fifteen queries concerning Sufi metaphysics posed to "the Sufi literati of Tabriz" by Rukh Al Din Amir Husayn Harawi (d. 1318). It was also the main reference used by François Bernier when explaining Sufism to his European friends (in: Lettre sur le Quietisme des Indes; 1688)

Other works include The Book of Felicity (Sa'adat-nāma) and The Truth of Certainty about the Knowledge of the Lord of the Worlds (Ḥaqq al-yaqīn fi ma'rifat rabb al-'alamīn. The former is regarded as a relatively unknown poetic masterpiece written in khafif meter, while the latter is his lone work of prose.

== See also ==
- Sufism
- List of famous Sufis
- List of Persian poets and authors
