= Ahmad Mashhadi =

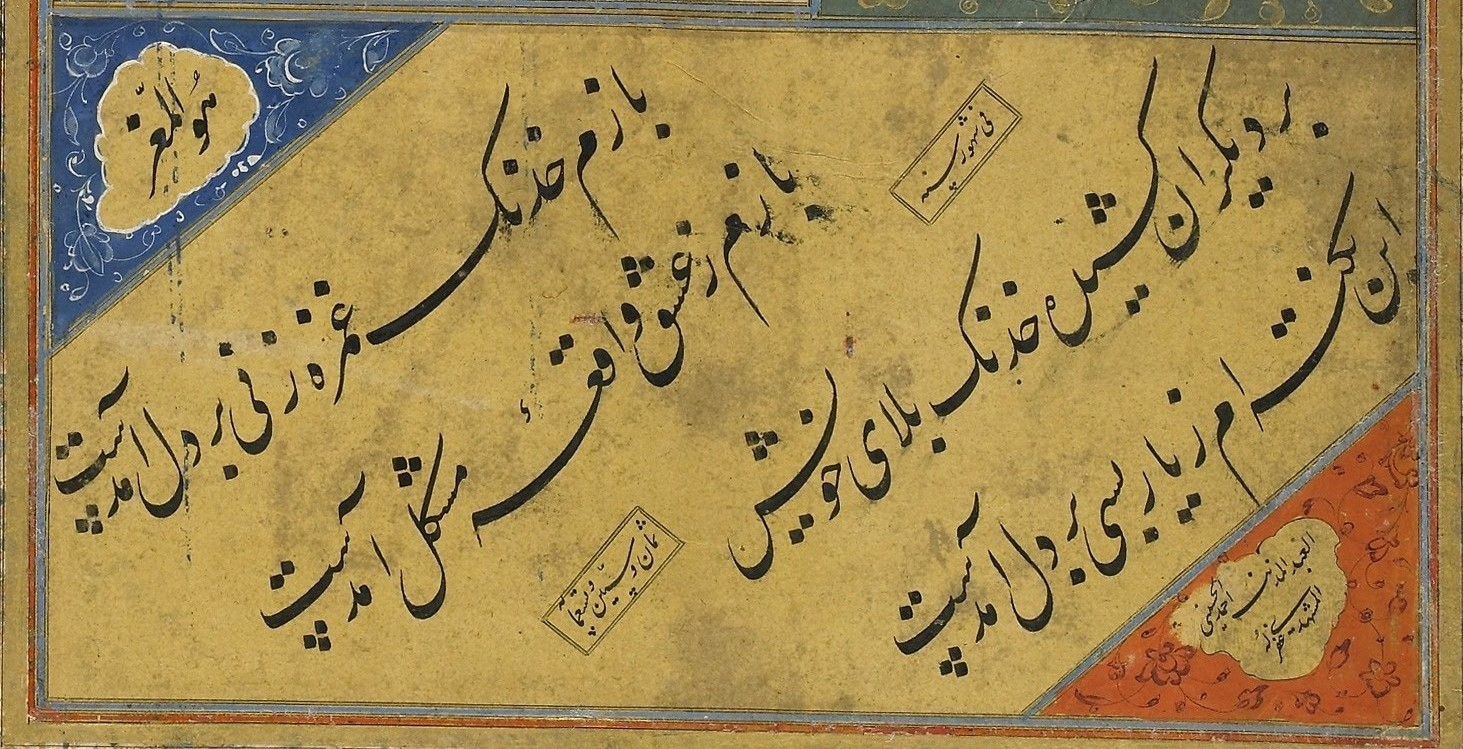
A calligraphy specimen of two couplets from the Divan of Amir Shahi, signed by Ahmad Mashhadi, dated A.H. 978 [1570 CE]. Arthur M. Sackler Gallery

Ahmad Mashhadi, also known as Mir Seyyed Ahmad, was an important Persian Nastaliq calligrapher in the 16th century. He was from Mashhad. He was also a poet and some of his original poems still exist.

== Biography ==
Mashhadi learnt calligraphy art in Herat under Mir Ali Heravi. After that Shaybanids captured the city, both of them immigrated to Bukhara. After Heravi's death, he worked some time as a scrivener in the library of Abdolaziz Khan Ozbak. When Abdolaziz Khan died, he came back to his home town. He worked there as a scrivener in the court of Tahmasp I and his successor Ismail II. He died in 1578 in Mazandaran.

== His students ==
- Hassan Ali Mashhadi
- Ali Reza Mashhadi
- Mohammad Rahim Mashhadi
- Ghanei
- Mohammad Hossein Tabrizi
- Ahmad Monshi Ghomi, the author of the book Golestan-e Honar.
