= Mir Ali Tabrizi =

14th-century Iranian artist and calligrapher

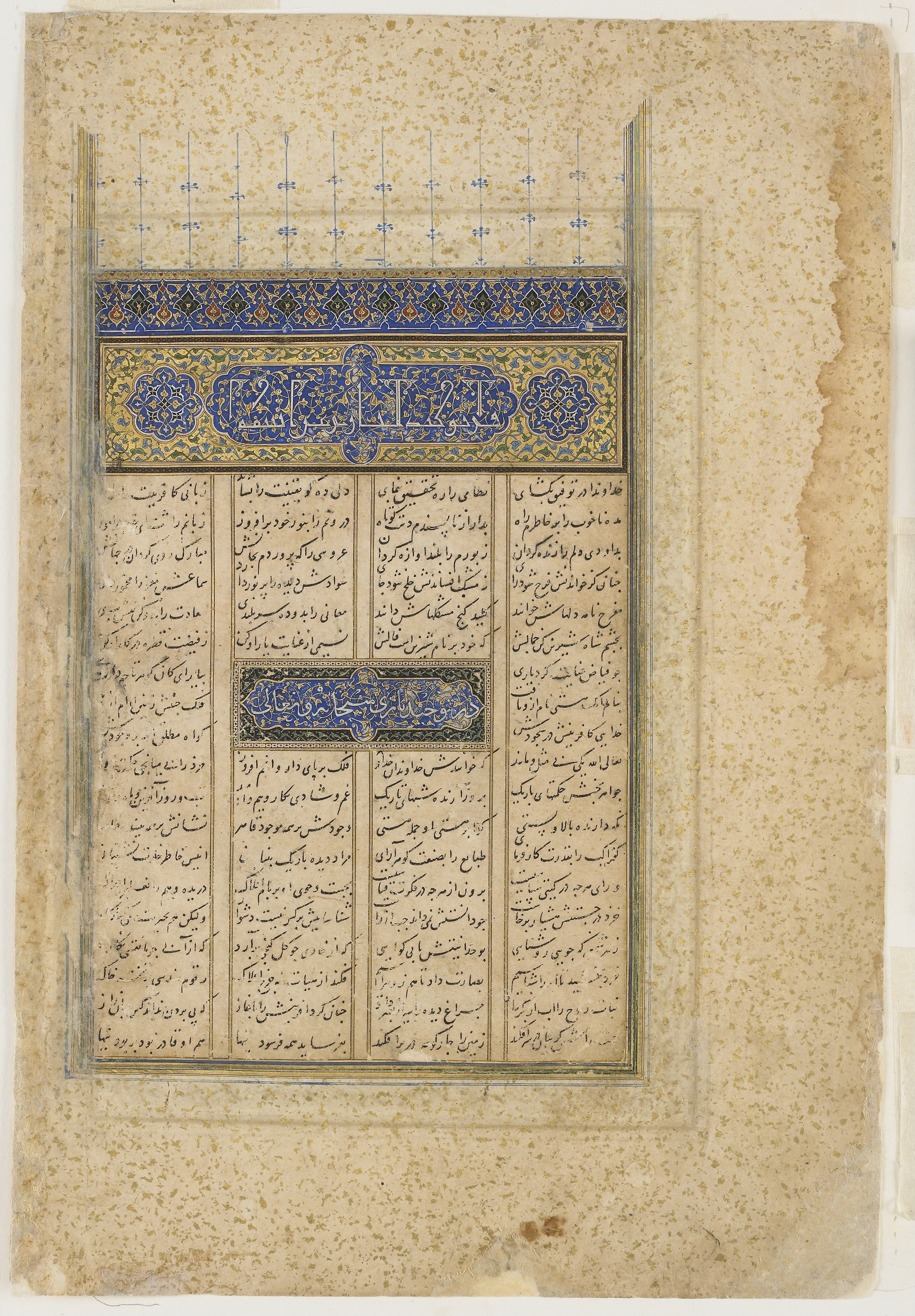
Opening page to a copy of Nizami's Khosrow and Shirin with calligraphy by Mir Ali Tabrizi. Tabriz, c. 1410. Freer Gallery of Art

Mir Ali Tabrizi (Persian: میرعلی تبریزی) was a distinguished Persian calligrapher of the 14th century, to whom the invention of Nastaliq calligraphy style is attributed.

== Early life ==
Mir Ali Tabrizi lived in the 14th century. Most details of his life are unknown. It is known that he lived in Tabriz, and was a poet as well as an adept calligrapher (see Dehkhoda dictionary).

== Nastaliq calligraphy ==
He is known as father of Nastaliq, the most popular style of Persian calligraphy. He was thus titled "Qodwat al-Kottab" (literally "the chief of the scribes"). He invented this calligraphy style by combining two older styles together, namely Naskh and Taliq.

Nastaliq is a light and elegant cursive script, similar to other types of Islamic calligraphy. In contrast to other Islamic scripts, Nastaliq has characters that appear to swing from the upper right to the lower left of each word as if suspended by an imaginary line. It features elongated horizontal strokes and exaggerated rounded forms with no serifs. The diacritical marks are casually placed, and the lines are flowing rather than straight.

There is a popular myth that Jafar Tabrizi, another well-known Persian calligrapher, was Mir Ali's pupil. Later, Jafar's students followed Mir Ali's style in Herat, where his scripts were frequently copied and highly praised.
