= Gulshan-i Raz =

Collection of Sufi poems by Mahmoud Shabestari

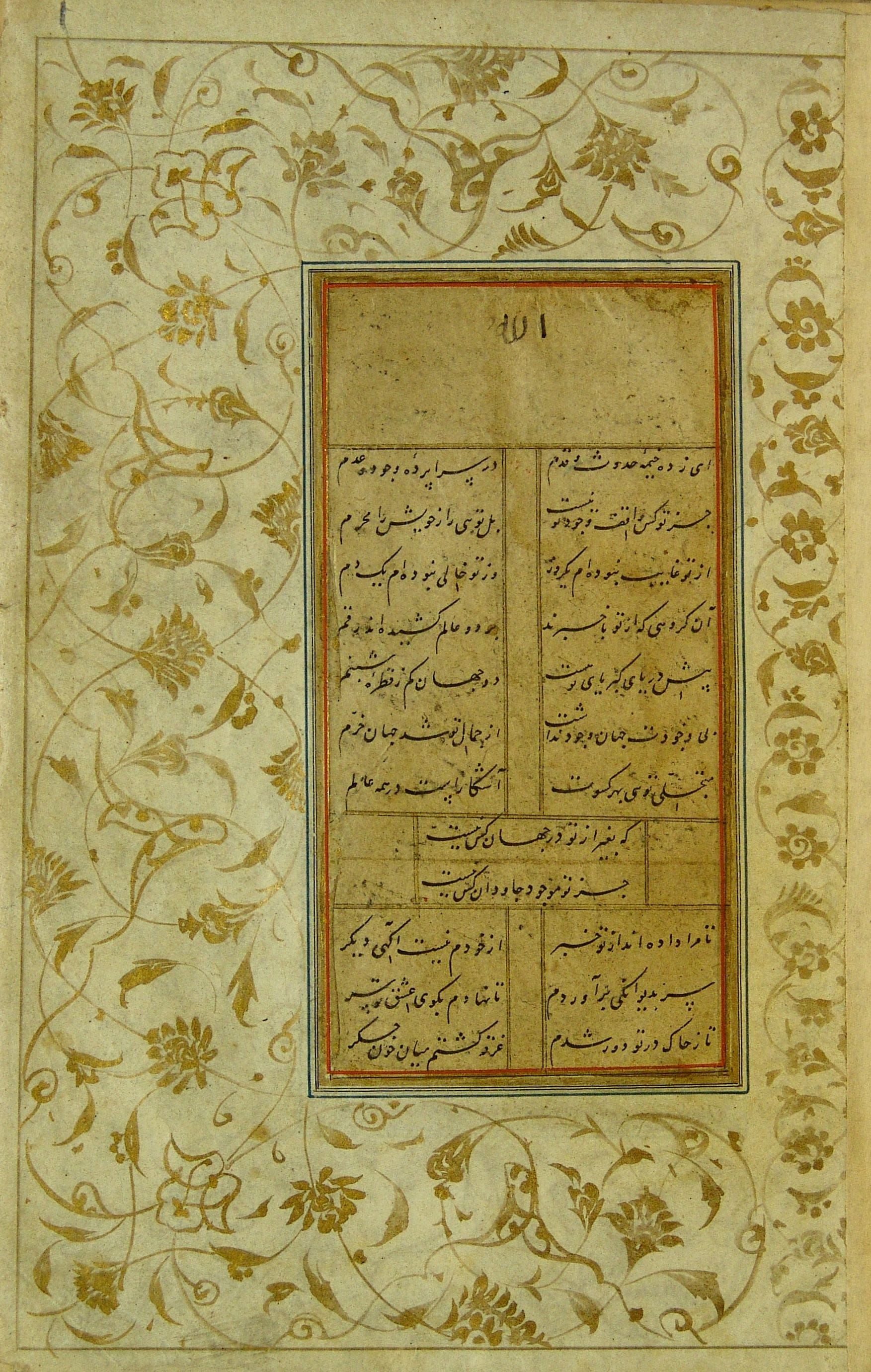
Page from manuscript of Gulshan-i Raz copied in nastaliq by Jafar Tabrizi (fl 1412-1431). Library of Astan Quds Razavi

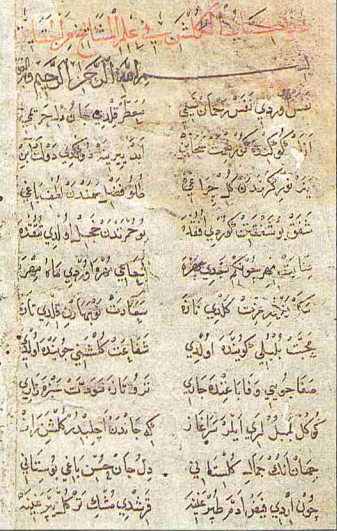
Azeri translation of Gulshan-i Raz by Sheikh Alvan of Shiraz

Gulshan-i Raz (also spelled Gulshan-e Raz and Golshan-e Raz; (Persian: گلشن راز, "Rose Garden of Secrets") is a collection of poems written in the 14th century by Sheikh Mahmoud Shabestari. It is considered to be one of the greatest classical Persian works of the Islamic mystical tradition known in the west as Sufism. The poems are mostly based on Irfan, Islam, Sufism and sciences dependent on them.

The book was written about 1311 in rhyming couplets. It was written in response to seventeen queries concerning Sufi metaphysics posed to "the Sufi literati of Tabriz" by Rukh Al Din Amir Husayn Harawi (d. 1318). It was also the main reference used by François Bernier when explaining Sufism to his European friends (in: Lettre sur le Quietisme des Indes; 1688). In English the book's title is variously given as "Garden of Secrets," "The Garden of Mystery," "The Mystic Rose Garden," or "The Secret Rose Garden."

Sufi poet Sheikh Alvān of Shiraz translated Gulshan-i Raz into Azeri Turkish verse.

This is the opening verse of Gulshan-i Raz:

به نام آنکه جان را فکرت آموخت / چراغ دل به نور جان برافروخت
In the name of Him who taught the soul to think,

and kindled the heart's lamp with the light of soul

== English editions ==
- The Secret Rose Garden; Translated by Edward Henry Whinfield; 1920, England.

== See also ==
- Gulshan-i 'Ishq
