= Sultan Ali Mashhadi =

Persian calligrapher and master of nastaliq script

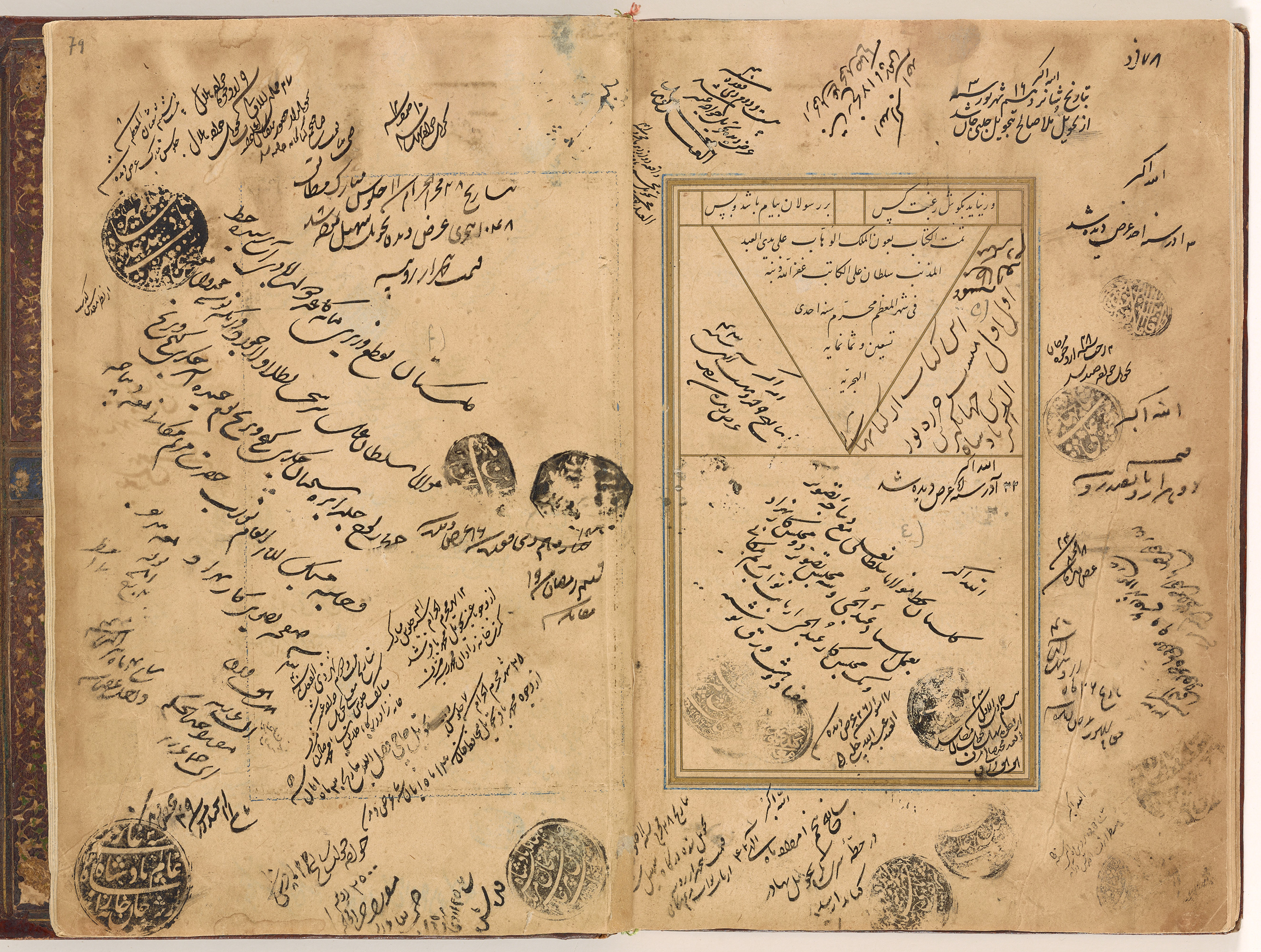
Colophon from the manuscript of Sa‛di's Gulistan, copied by Sultan ‛Ali in 1486. The calligrapher’s signature appears in the triangular colophon. Later owners and librarians added their names and comments in various styles of nastaliq. One somewhat clumsy example is located to the right of the triangle. Written by the Jahangir (1605–27), the inscription maintains: “This is one of my earliest books. I read it constantly. Written by Nur al-Din Jahangir, son of King Akbar.” Art and History Collection

Sultan Ali Mashhadi (Persian: سلطان‌علی مشهدی; fl 1453–1519, d. 1520) was a Persian calligrapher and master of the nastaliq script.

Born in Mashhad, Sultan ‛Ali lost his father when he was seven and that early on in life he began practicing calligraphy on his own. He was autodidact till he moved to Herat somewhere around the year 1468. There he was trained by Azhar, or by one of Azhar’s students. From 1470 Sultan ‛Ali worked for the major bibliophiles of the time, Sultan Husayn (1469–1506) and his boon companion Ali-Shir Nava'i. He designed architectural inscriptions, such as the one (1477–8) on the marble platform for the tombstones of Sultan Husayn’s ancestors erected in the Shrine of Khwaja Abd Allah. He also calligraphed some of the finest Persian and Turkish manuscripts produced for the Timurid court, such as a copy of Sa‛di’s Gulistan (1486; Art and History Collection, LTS1995.2.30), copy of ‛Attar’s Mantiq al-tayr (1487; Met., 63.210) and a copy of Sa‛di’s Bustan (1488; Egyptian N. Lib., Adab Farsi 908).

After Sultan Husayn's death in 1506 and the overthrow of the Timurid dynasty Sultan ‛Ali retired to Mashhad. There in 1514 he wrote Adab-e Khatt (“Etiquette of Calligraphy”), a verse treatise in Persian on writing and teaching calligraphy, which was later incorporated in Qazi Ahmad's biography of calligraphers and painters. This work contains both practical and autobiographical information and shows the close association between religious discipline and the practice of calligraphy. He died in Mashhad.

Compared to the hand of his predecessor Jafar Tabrizi (fl. 1412–1431), Sultan ‛Ali's is more spacious, delicate and fluid. He shows a mastery of control and modulation, introducing visual rhythms by elongating and emphasizing certain forms, like the stroke on letter kaph. Sultan ‛Ali's nastaliq "demonstrates a fine balance between fluidity and discipline, the same characteristics that he mentioned in his treatise on calligraphy". In his writings the eastern, or Khorasani, style of nastaliq, associated with Jafar and Azhar, reached its classic form, and in the Safavid era also became the predominant in western Iran. "The eastern style, as further perfected in the following centuries, is the nastaliq now in use in Persia". Because of this nastaliq of Sultan ‛Ali "remained the epitome of the style, assidously collected and treasured by later connoiseurs and emulated by his successors for centuries to come". Qazi Ahmad wrote about Sultan ‛Ali that "His writing conquered the world and is among other writings as the sun among other planets". Sultan ‛Ali trained many great calligraphers of the 16th century, like Sultan Muhammad Nur or Sultan Muhammad Khandan.

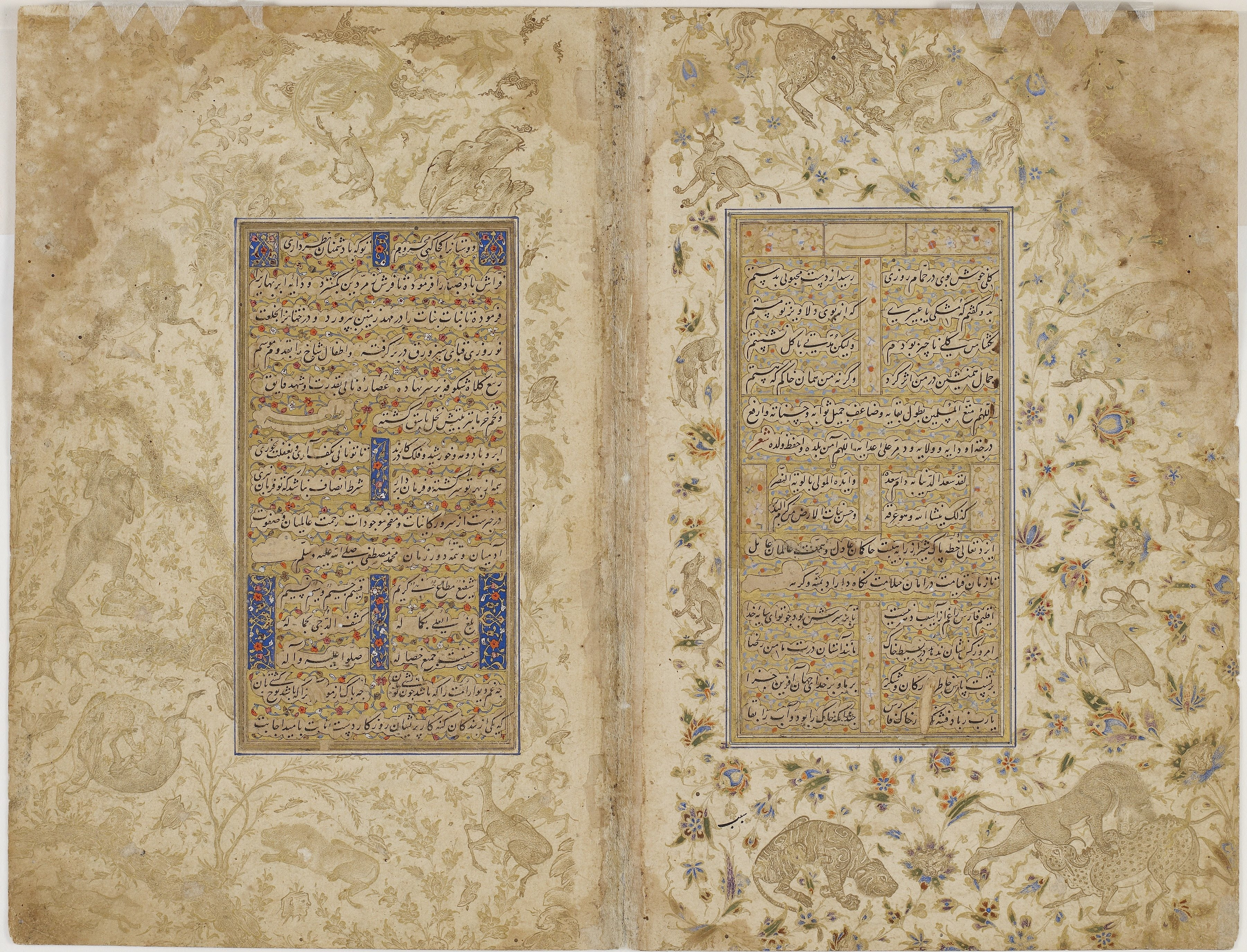
Detached folio from a Gulistan by Sa‛di. Herat, 1468. Sometime during the early 16th century, the margins of its first sixteen folios were lavishly illuminated. The exquisite design have been attributed to Aqa Mirak (fl 1520–1575). Freer Gallery of Art

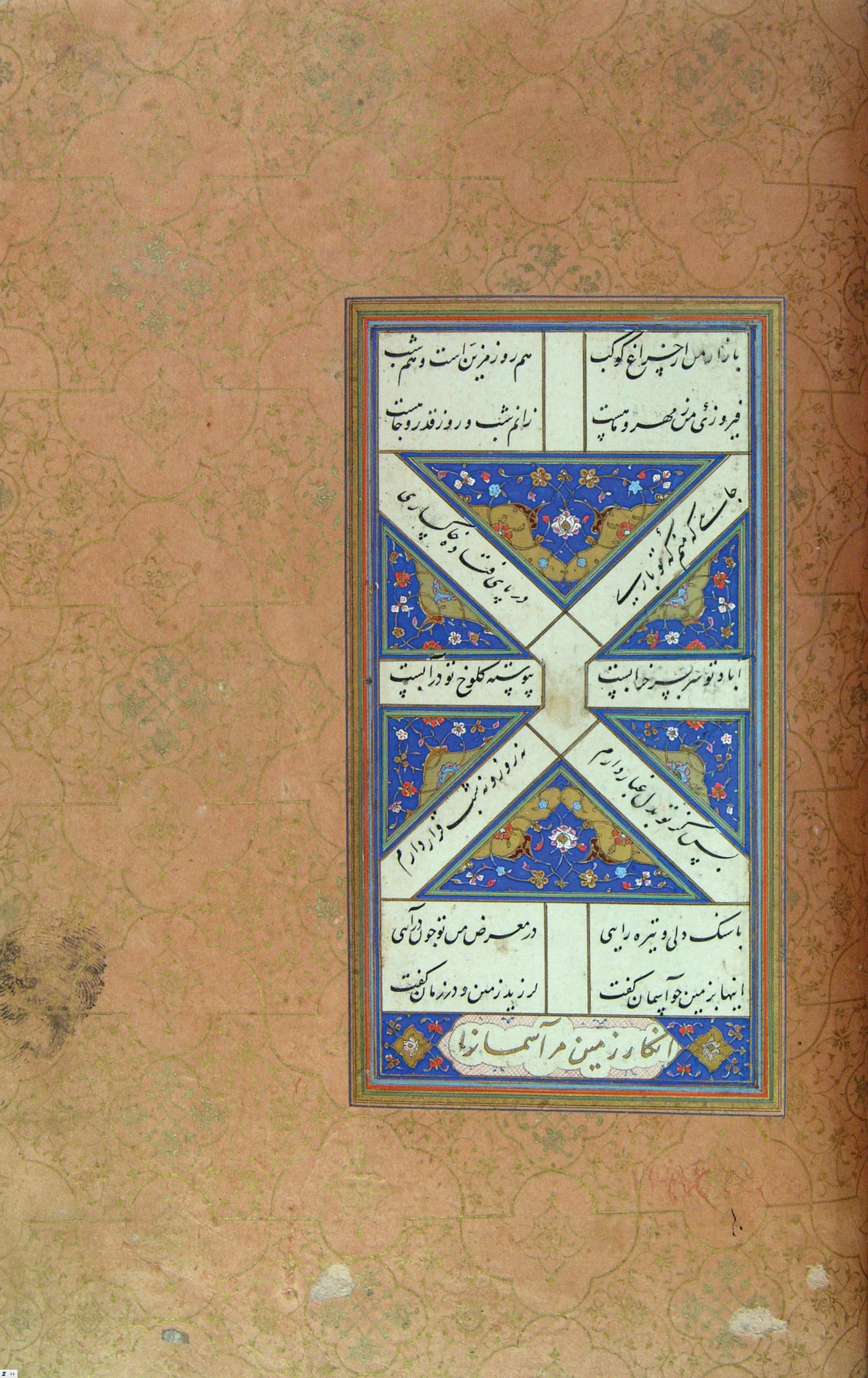
Calligraphic composition with verses from ‘Arefi Heravi's (d. 1438) Guy-u-Chugan. Herat, 1470. Golestan Palace Library

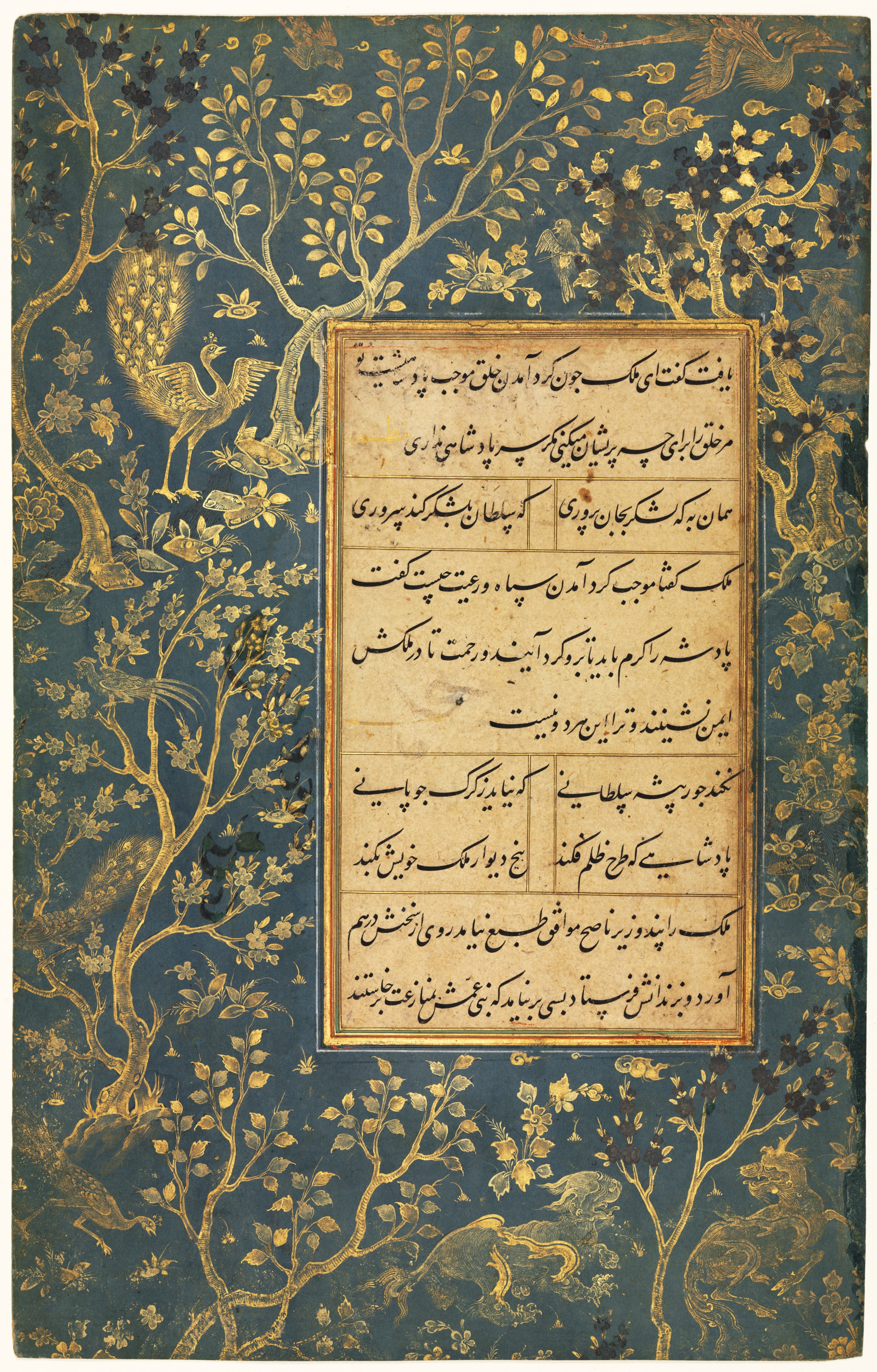
Detached folio from a Gulistan by Sa‛di. Herat, 1475–1500 (borders from the Safavid era). Cleveland Museum of Art

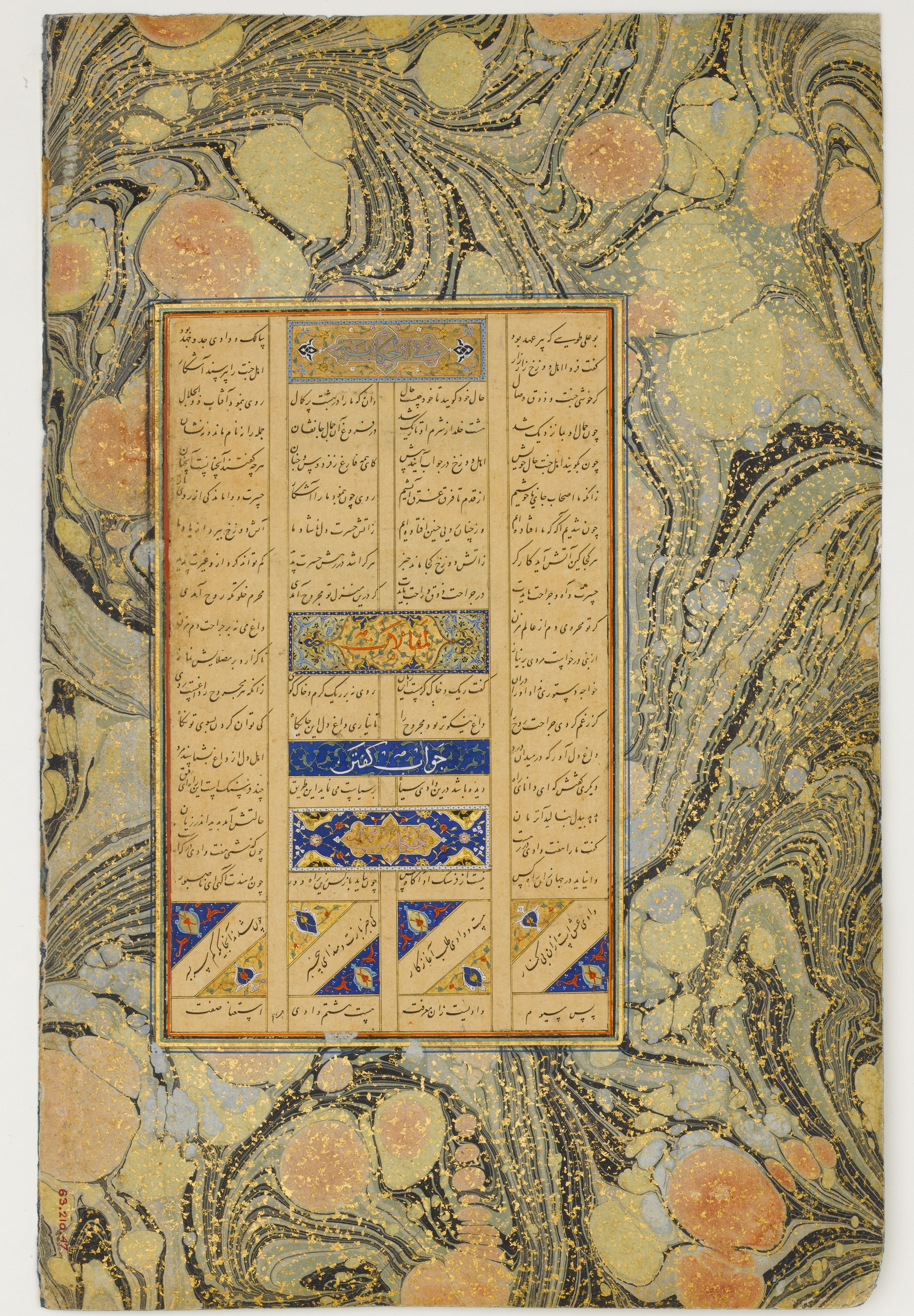
Page from an ‛Attar’s Mantiq al-tayr. Herat, dated 25 April 1487 (illumination by Zayn al-‛Abidin Tabrizi (d. 1602) from c. 1600). Metropolitan Museum of Art

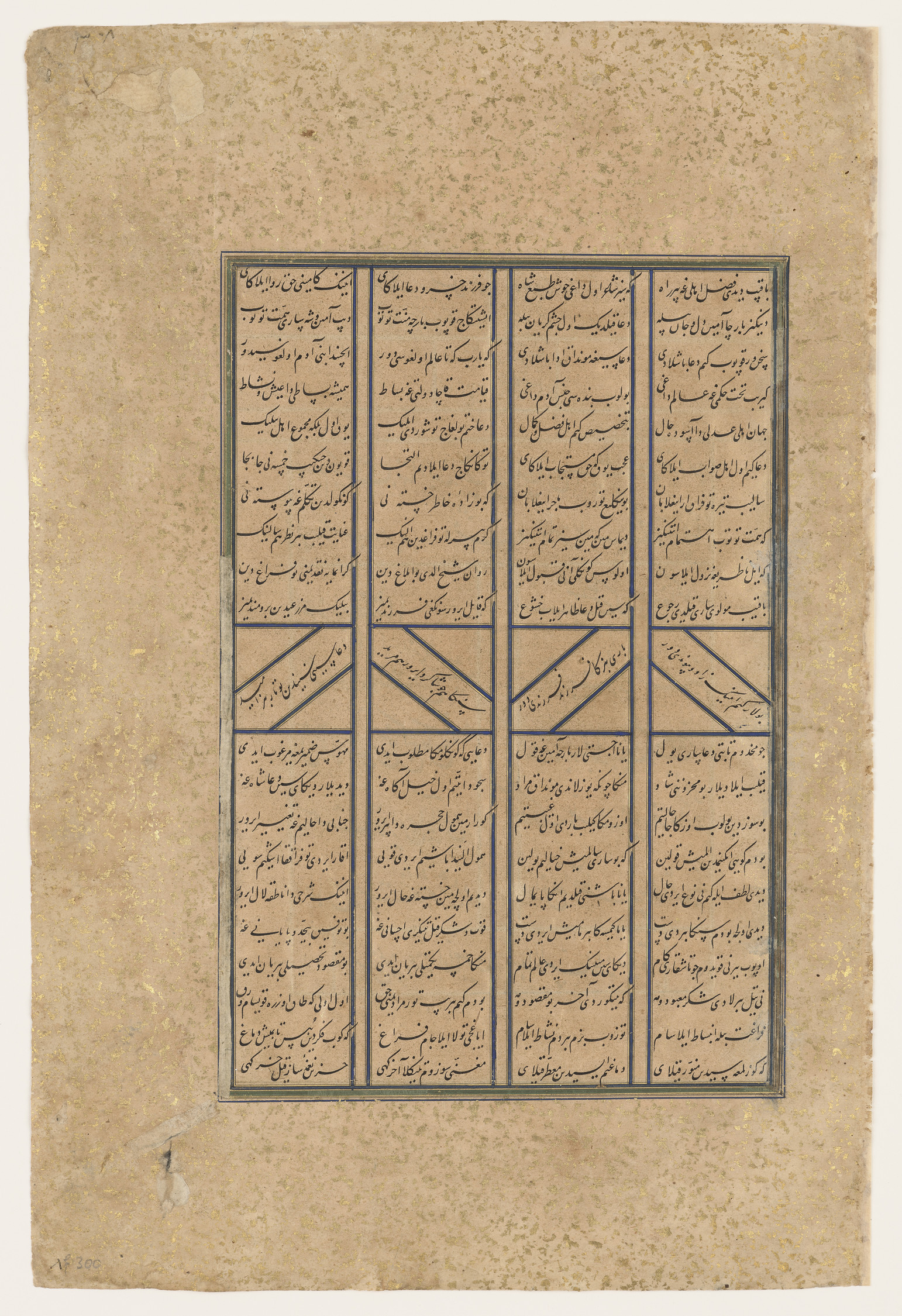
Page from a Khamsah by ‛Alishir Nava’i. Herat, 1492. Royal Collection

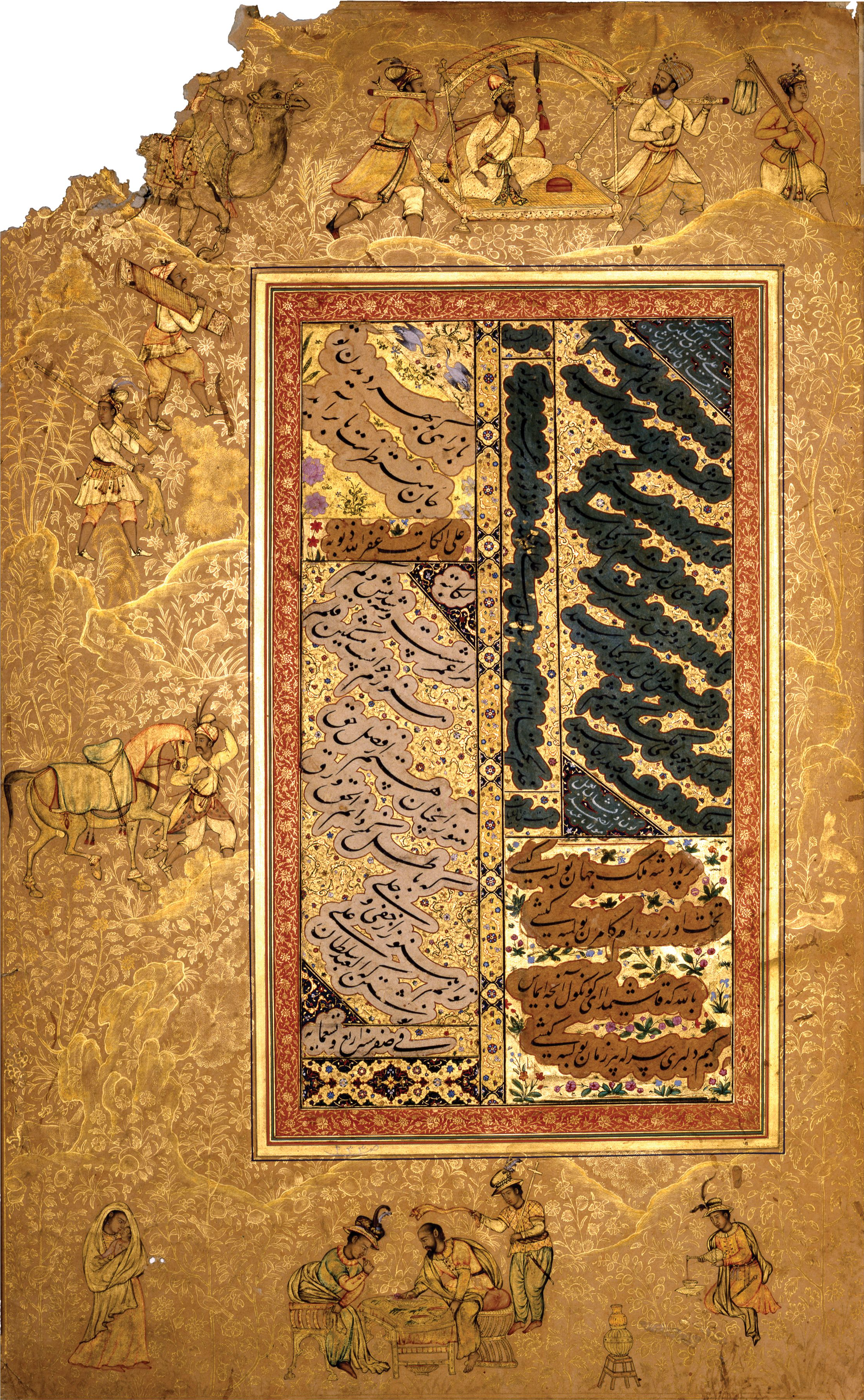
Page from the Gulshan Album with a poem composed and written by Sultan ‛Ali (illumination from the early 17th century). Herat, 1499. Golestan Palace Library

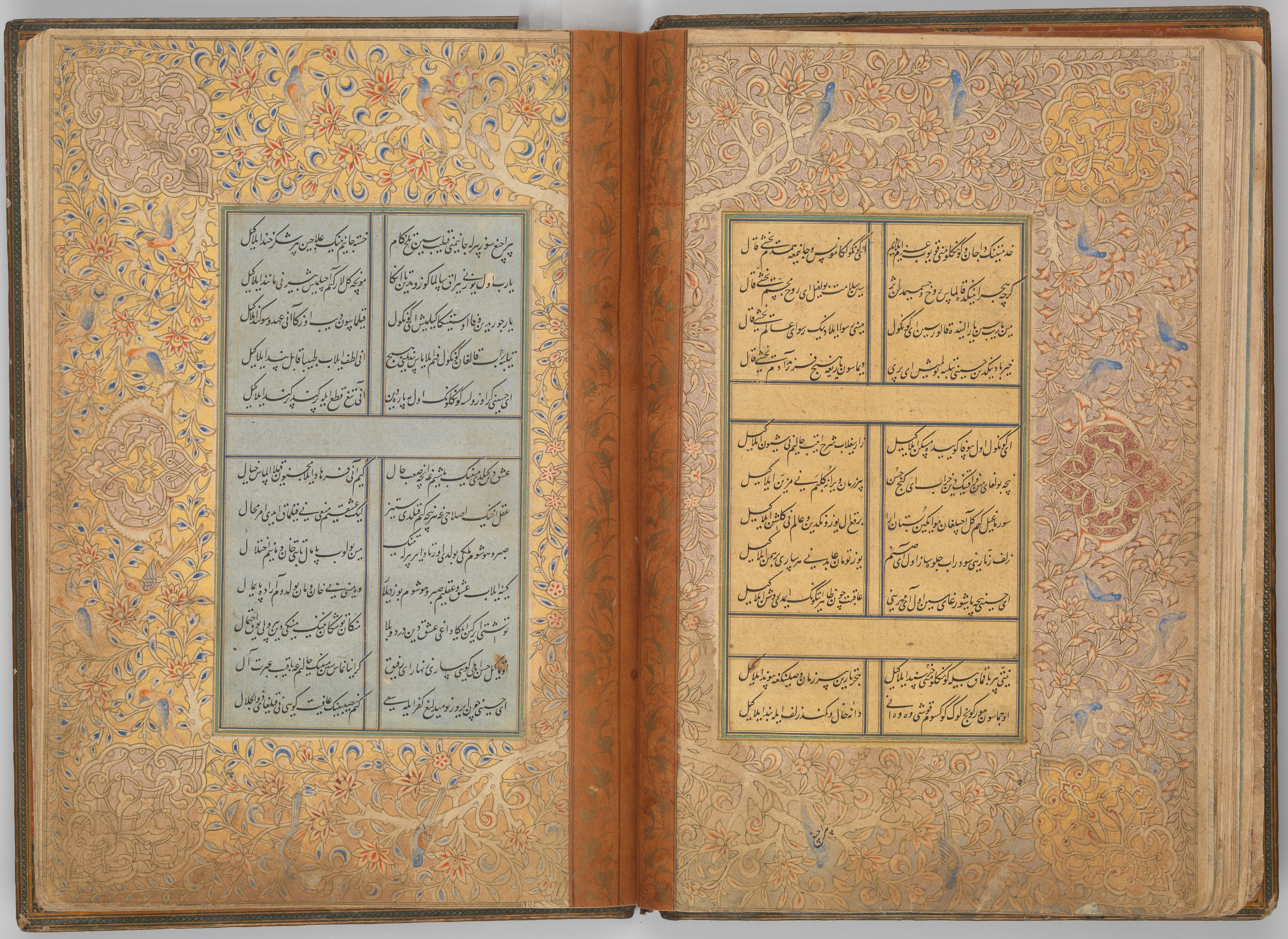
Double-page from the Divan of Sultan Husayn Bayqara. Herat, c. 1500. Metropolitan Museum of Art

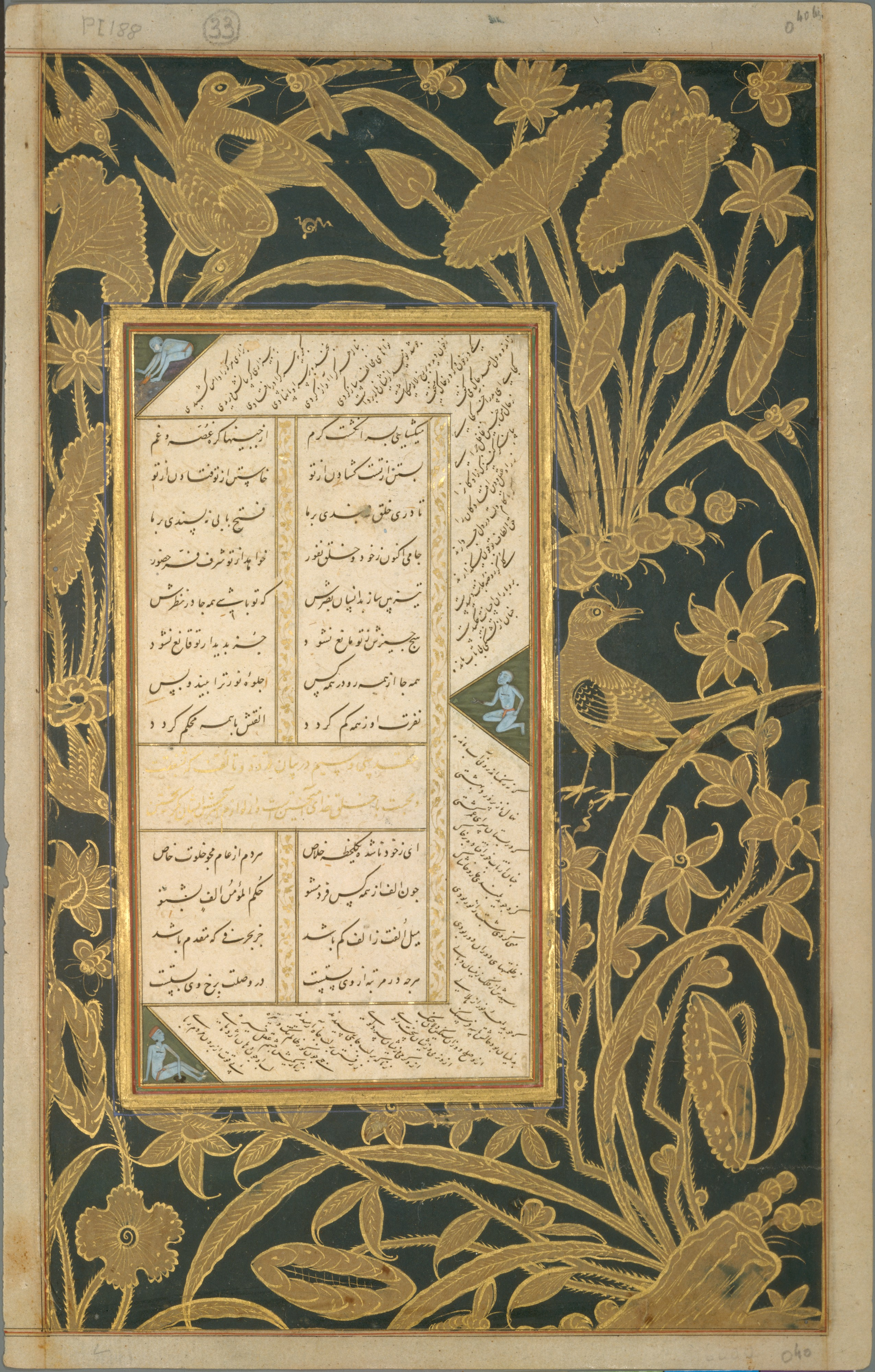
Page from a Subhat al-Abrar by Jami (borders are from the first quarter of the 17th century). Herat, c. 1500. Metropolitan Museum of Art

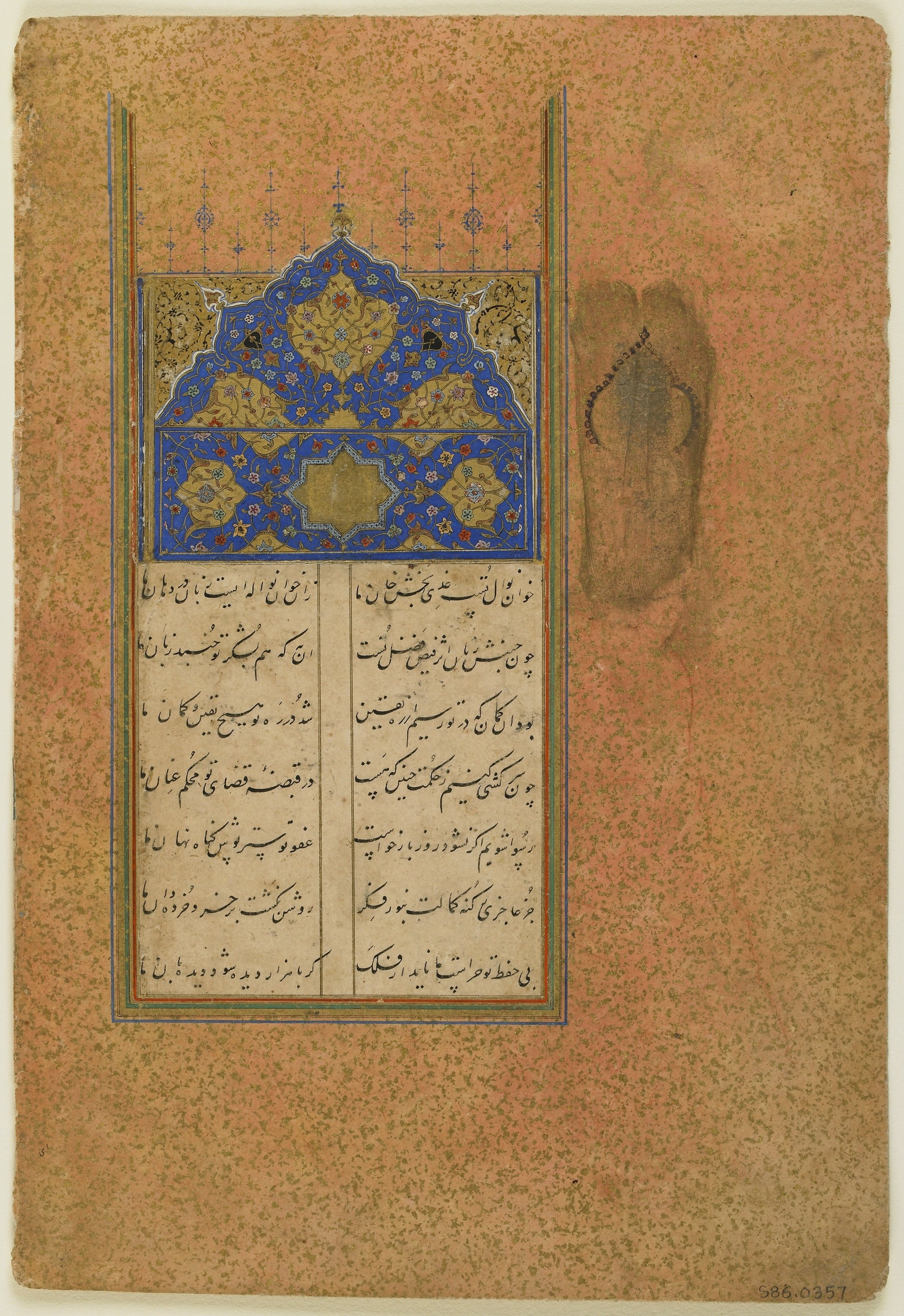
Detached folio from a dispersed copy of the Divan (collected poems) by Suhayli (d. 1501/2). Herat, early 16th century. Arthur M. Sackler Gallery

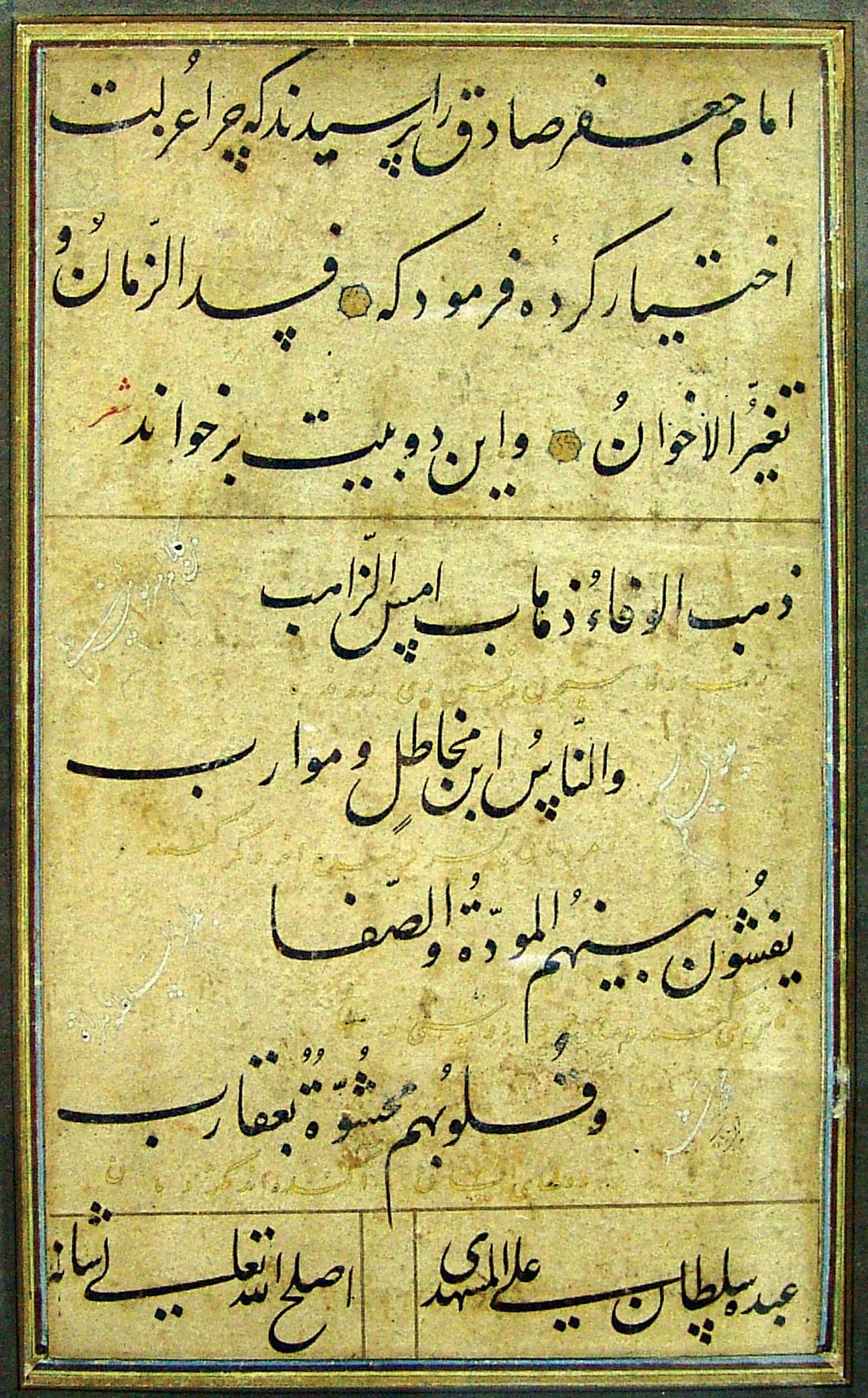
Calligraphy with a Persian translation of the Arabic poetry written in a lighter ink with tahrir. Herat. Mostaz‘afan Foundation Archive

== Bibliography ==
- Blair, Sheila (2008). Islamic Calligraphy. Edinburgh University Press. ISBN 978-0748612123.
- Gholam-Hosayn Yusofi. "CALLIGRAPHY". Encyclopædia Iranica.
- Wheeler M. Thackston (2003). "Sultan 'Ali Mashhadi". Grove Art Online. doi:10.1093/gao/9781884446054.article.T082297. ISBN 978-1-884446-05-4.
