= Ahmad Monshi Qomi =

16th-century Persian author and calligrapher

- Native name: Persian: احمد منشی قمی
- Born: 1547 Qom, Safavid Iran
- Notable works: Golestan-e Honar

Ahmad Monshi Qomi, also known as Ghazi Ahmad, was a Persian author and calligrapher.

== Biography ==
Ghazi Ahmad was born in 1547 in Qom. He was the son of Sharaf ed-Din Hossein Qomi, who was the scrivener of Sam Mirza Safavi in Herat. When he was 11 years old, he moved with his father to Mashhad and spent 20 years in that city. Under the protection of Ibrahim Mirza, he took lessons from famous masters such as Shah Mahmud Nishapuri, Mir Ahmad Mashhadi and Malek Deylami until the age of 31. Ebrahim Mirza was well-educated in both the arts and the sciences and prominent poets, calligraphers, and painters worked in his library. Ghazi Ahmad spent his youth in the art circles of Ebrahim Mirza's court.

He also had relations with many painting and calligraphy masters outside of Ebrahim mirza's library and because of this he could recount in detail the lives of artists during the Safavid era. His work, Golestan-e Honar, introduces artists, whom he knew personally or through other trusted persons. He has other books like Kholassat ot-Tavarikh, which recounts the history of the Safavid dynasty from Safi-ad-Din Ardabili to the early reign of Abbas I, and also Majma osh-Shoara and Managheb of-Fozala. In 1599, Abbas I got angry at Ghazi Ahmad and ordered his dismissal. After he was dismissed he went to Qom. In 1607, he met Molana Mohammad Amir Aghili Rostamdari Ardebili, who was a well-known calligrapher in that time. Ghazi Ahmad wrote about him in Golestan-e Honar.
