= Maulana Azhar =

Iranian calligrapher

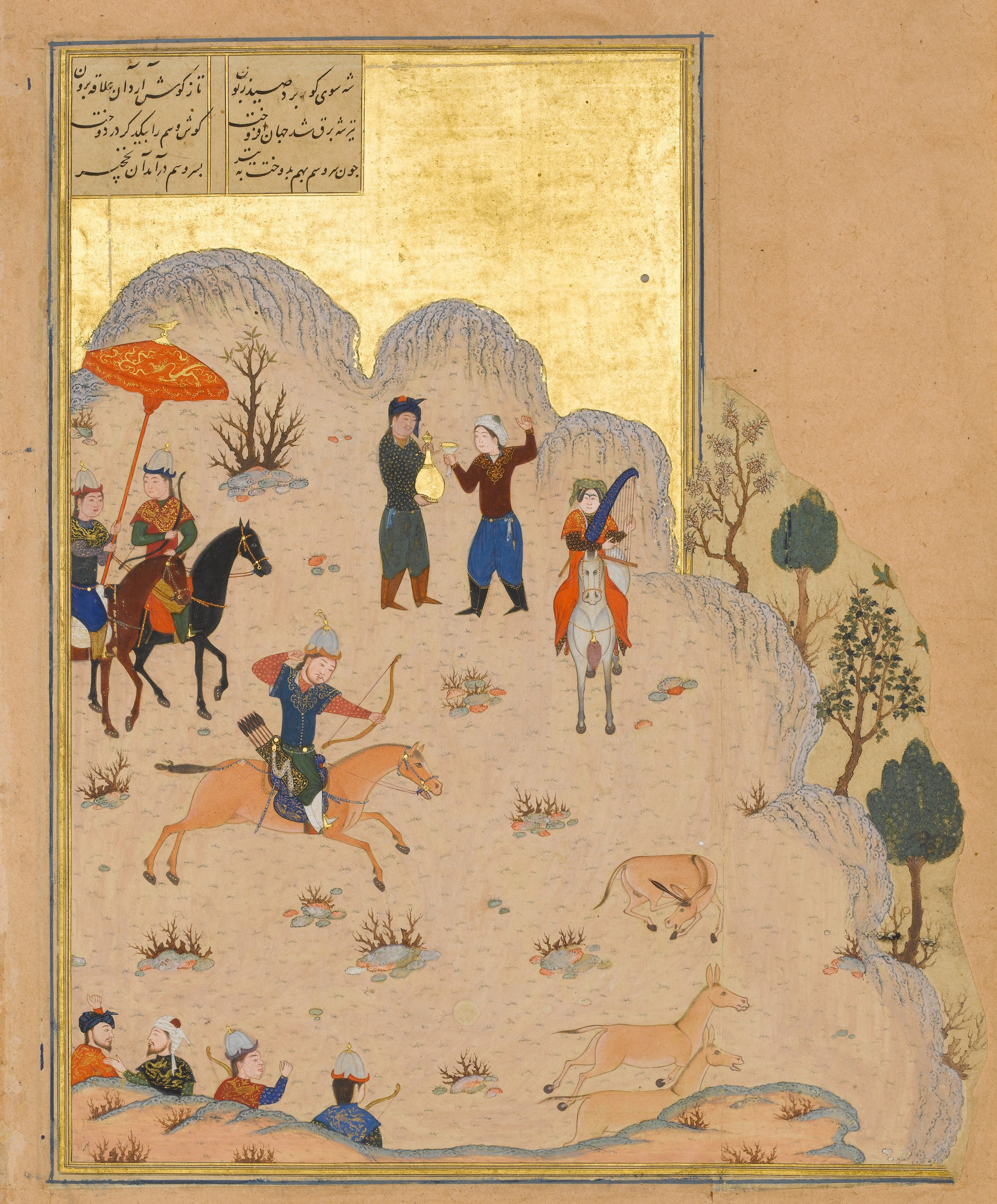
Bahram Gur's Skill with the Bow by Maulana Azhar, Metropolitan Museum of Art, 1430

Maulana Azhar (died 1475) was a Persian calligrapher.

Azhar was trained by Jafar Tabrizi and worked for Shah Rukh in the Timurid court. His calligraphy primarily used the Nastaʿlīq script.
