= Golestan-e Honar =

1598 book by Ahmad Monshi Ghomi

Golestan-e Honar (Persian: گلستان هنر; also Romanized as Golestān-e Honar) is a book written by Ahmad Monshi Ghomi. It is one of few sources, which gives valuable information about calligraphers and painters and the history of art of bookmaking in Persia in the late Timurid to the middle of Safavid period and contains first-hand information on some of the artists and patrons, whom the author and his family members came into contact with. The book was written in 1598 in the Safavid era. In 1607, another edition of this book was published with some deletions and additions in the previous edition. Golestan-e Honar introduces artists, whom the author knew personally or knew about them by other trusted persons. Therefore, the book is one of the main sources for study and research about the art and artists in the Safavid era. The author used poems of famous poets in all parts of the book.

Golestan-e Honar has five parts:

- Part one: About thuluth script and its origin and also biography of 58 thuluth masters.
- Part two: About the Taʿlīq calligraphy and biography of 38 masters of this script.
- Part three: About the Nastaliq calligraphers and biography of 67 Nastaliq masters.
- Part four: Biography of 41 painting masters.
- Last Part: About table, illuminated manuscript, colors and making ink and other library accessories and washing Lapis.
