= Jafar Tabrizi =

Iranian calligrapher of early Timurid period, master of Nastaliq script

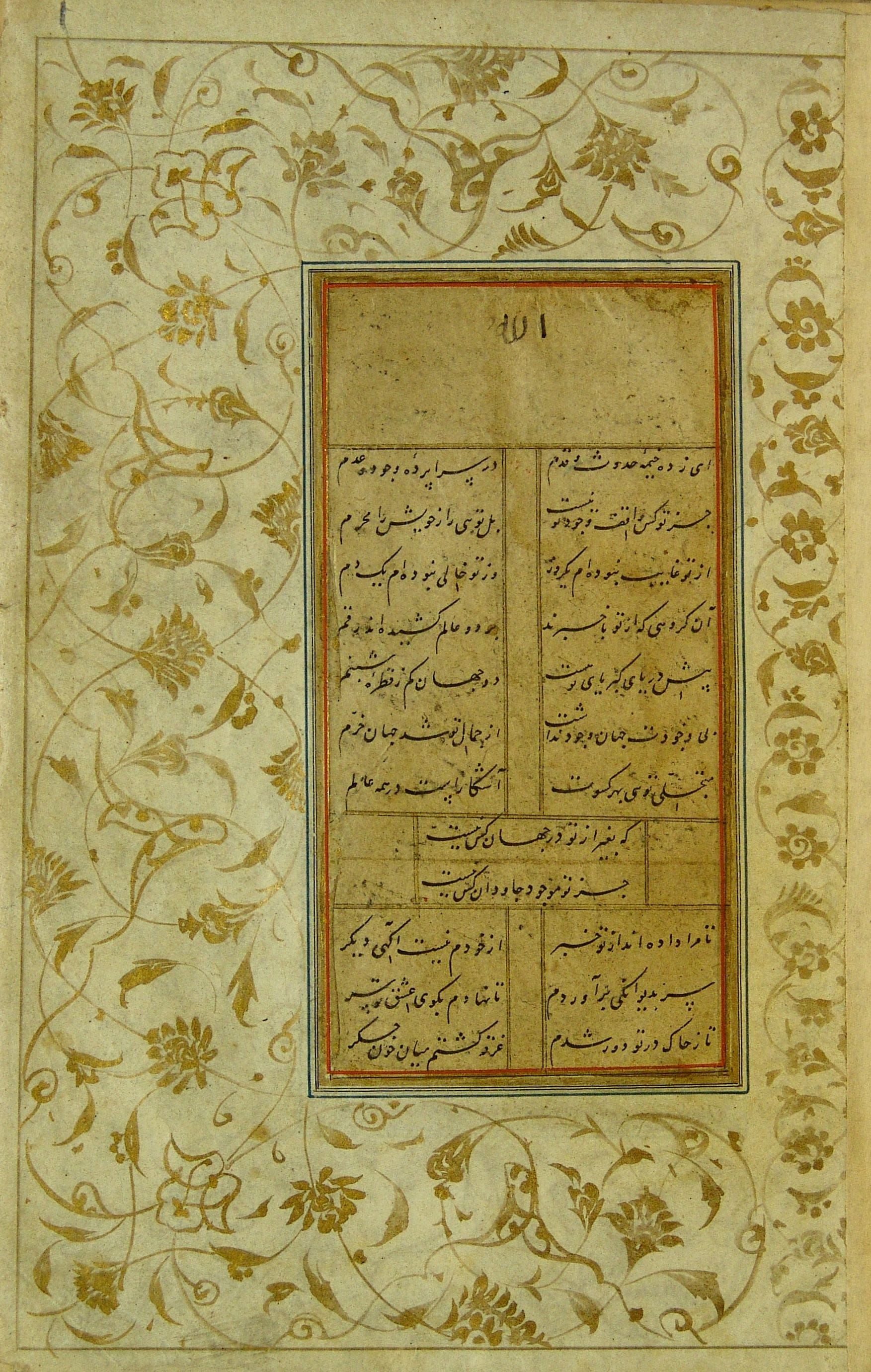
Page from the manuscript of Gulshan-i Raz. Library of Astan Quds Razavi

Mawlana Farīd al-Dīn Jaʿfar b. ʿAlī Tabrīzī Baysunghurī (fl. 1412–1433), better known as Jaʿfar Tabrīzī (Persian: جعفر تبریزی), and also as Qeblat al-Kottāb, was an Iranian calligrapher and master of nastaliq script.

== Biography ==
Born in Tabriz, according to Dust Muhammad, Ja‛far was trained in the classic six scripts (al-aqlam al-sitta) by Shams al-Din Qattabi, whose line of tutelage went back to ‛Abdallah Sayrafi (d. after 1345/46). His teacher of nastaliq was ‛Abdallah, son of Mir Ali Tabrizi (14th/15th century), traditionally recognized as inventor of this script. After youth in Tabriz Ja‛far moved to Herat, where he served at the court of Shah Rukh (r. 1405-1447) and supervised the scriptorium (kitābkhāna) of prince Baysunghur, thereby gaining the epithet Baysunghuri.

A unique report (Pers. ‛arẓadāsht) from c. 1429 preserved in Topkapı Palace Library (H2153, f.98a) gives us a glimpse into how this royal book atelier functioned. Ja‛far was in charge of forty calligraphers, who were housed in a special building within the palace precinct together with painters. The document is a progress report from Ja‛far to his patron Baysunghur and describes several manuscripts in progress, with informations about the names of the artists (calligraphers, illuminators, frame decorators, binders) involved in each project. According to report calligraphers also designed inscriptions and painters were responsible for decorated saddles, wall paintings and tents.

Following Baysunghur's death, Jaʿfar worked under the patronage of prince's son, Ala al-Dawla. He wrote poems portraying his court position at the service of Shahrukh, Baysunghur and Ala al-Dawla.

== Works and style ==
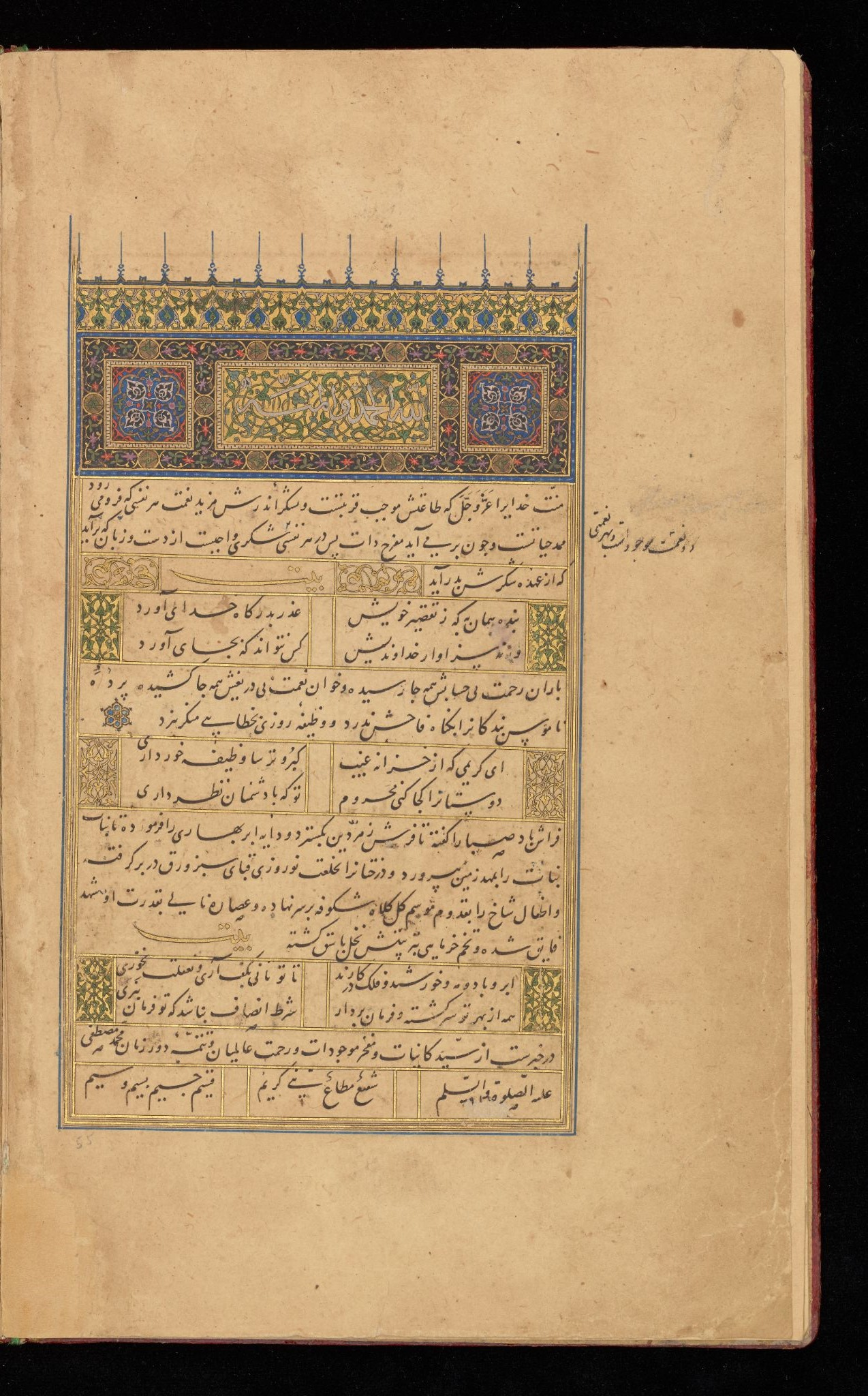
First Page of the Baysunghur's Gulistan. Herat, 1426/27. Chester Beatty Library. Copied by Jafar Tabrizi.

Jaʿfar Tabrizi personally copied many of the finest illuminated manuscripts made in Herat of his time. His signed and dated works include manuscript of the Divan of Hasan Dihlavi (Tehran, Majlis Library, no. 4017), copied in 1412–13, Kulliyyat of Humam-i Tabrizi (1413), Khosrow and Shirin (1421), Nasāyeh-e Eskandar (1425), Gulistan of Saʿdi (Chester Beatty Library, Per 119) dated 1426/27, celebrated Baysunghuri Shahnameh (Golestan Palace Library, MS. 4752) from 1429/30, copy of Kalila wa Dimna (Topkapı Palace Library, H362) dated 1431, Tarikh-e Isfahan (1431), Khamsa of Nizami (MMA, 1994.232) dated 1431/32, Lama'at of Iraqi (1432), Miscellany (Chester Beatty Library, Per 122), copied in 1431–32, and also Jong-e Marāsī, an elegy upon prince's death in 837/1433.

Ja‛far’s mastery of the six scripts, particularly thuluth, naskh and muhaqqaq, is evident in the specimens of his calligraphy preserved in several albums (e.g. Topkapı Palace Library, H. 2153, fols 27r, 58r, 160v). His smooth nastaliq is typical of early examples of the script in which the individual graphic units are placed at a 30° angle to the horizontal writing line. Both rhythm and spacing are tightly controlled. Controlled, albeit noticeable, variation in the thickness of the stroke also characterizes Jaʿfar’s writing as well as an elongated and slightly curved upper ascending stroke of the kaf letter. These upper strokes of the kaf are often placed at a wider angle than the other diagonal strokes. According to Simon Rettig "These features define in fact the nastaliq of Jaʿfar at Herat when he achieved what would be later regarded as the first «classical form» of nastaliq". Ja‛far’s nastaliq did not reach the fluidity shown by Sultan Ali Mashhadi nor the elegance achieved by the next generation of nastaliq calligraphers trained by Ja‛far in Herat, such as Shaykh Mahmud Zarin–qalam (fl 1442–66) and Azhar (fl 1421–72). Another important student of Ja‛far was ‛Abdallah Tabbakh (fl 1429–61).

== Heritage ==
Invention of nastaliq was traditionally attributed to Mir Ali Tabrizi who from the beginning of the 16th century was called "inventor of the prototype" (vazi al-asl) of nastaliq (at the same time, some authors made Ja‛far direct student of Mir Ali, not his son ‛Abdallah). But manuscripts with authentic calligraphy of Mir Ali were not available (today we knew only one manuscript which without doubt is written by his hand) and in this situation it is the work of Ja‛far that becomes real point of departure for all subsequent writers in nastaliq. That's why famous calligrapher of Safavid period, Shah Mahmud Nishapuri, called Ja‛far "second inventor" of nastaliq (Nishapuri calligraphic exercise in Bahram Mirza Album) and in calligraphy in Topkapı Album Ja‛far is called "our master Kamal al-Din Ja‛far of Tabriz" (Topkapı H. 2153, f. 120r.) This brings Simon Rettig to conclusion that "the profusion of examples by Ja‛far Tabrizi and his direct link to Mir Ali, as narrated in the histories of calligraphy, made him ultimately regarded as the first great master calligrapher for the nastaliq script. Indeed, Ja‛far is the one who brought change to the script significant enough for him to be regarded as an influential innovator.... The place occupied by Ja‛far may even eclipse the role played by Mir Ali in the development of the nastaliq script”.

Style of nastaliq created by Ja‛far in Herat achieved its classical form under Sultan Ali Mashhadi, a student of Azhar (or perhaps one of Azhar’s students). Shortly after Ja‛far's death a different style of nastaliq developed in western and southern Iran. It was associated with ʿAbd al-Rahman Khwarazmi, the calligrapher of the Pir Budaq Qara Qoyunlu (1456–1466) and after him was followed by his children, ʿAbd al-Karim Khwarazmi and ʿAbd al-Rahim Anisi (both active at the court of Ya'qub Beg Aq Qoyunlu; 1478–1490). This more angular western Iranian style was largely dominant at the beginning of the Safavid era, but then lost to the style canonized by Sultan Ali Mashhadi. Therefore Ja‛far becomes first master of a style, which dominated all subsequent writing in nastaliq.

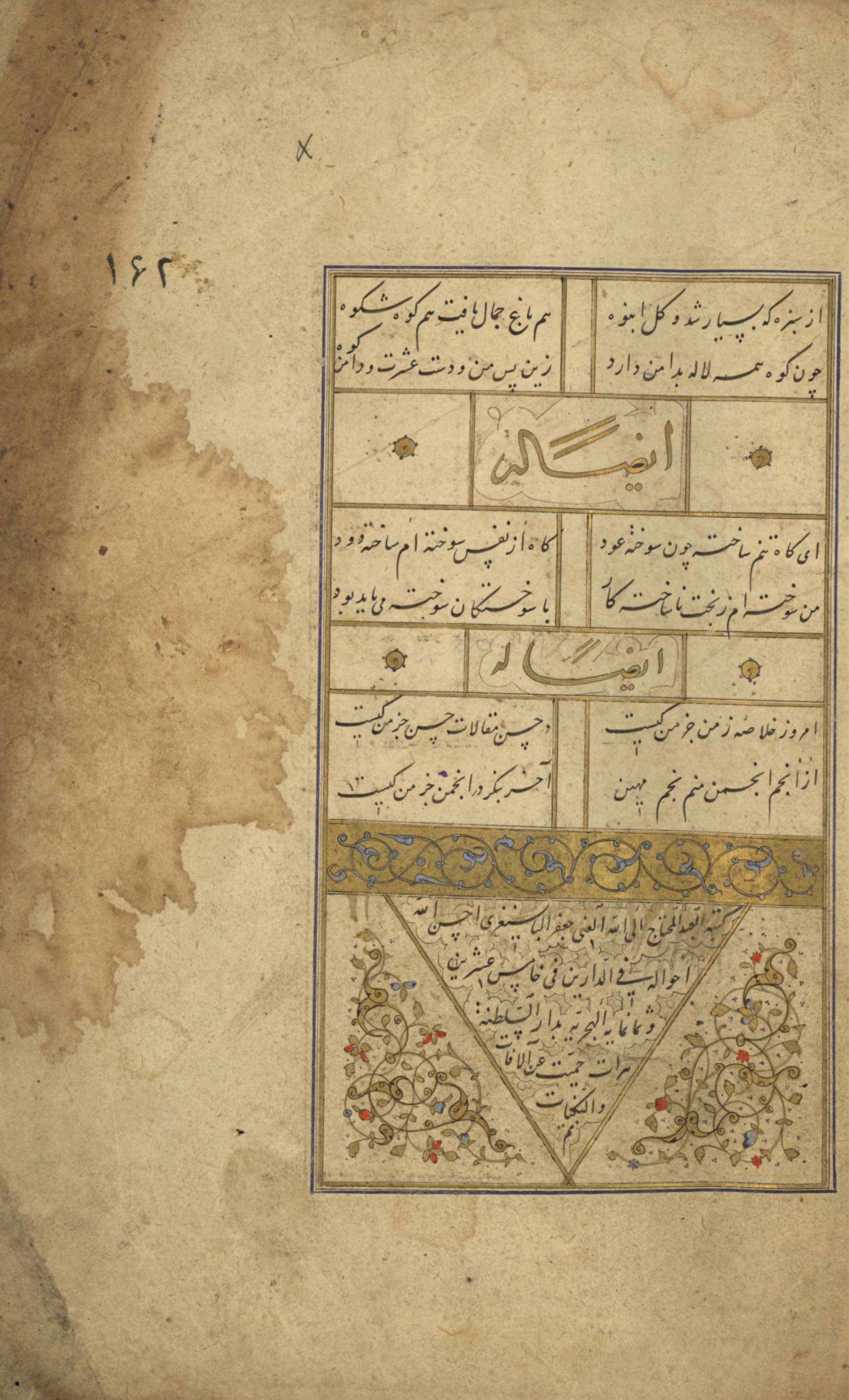
Page from a diwan of Hasan Sijzi Dihlavi. Herat, 1421–1422. Library of the Islamic Consultative Assembly

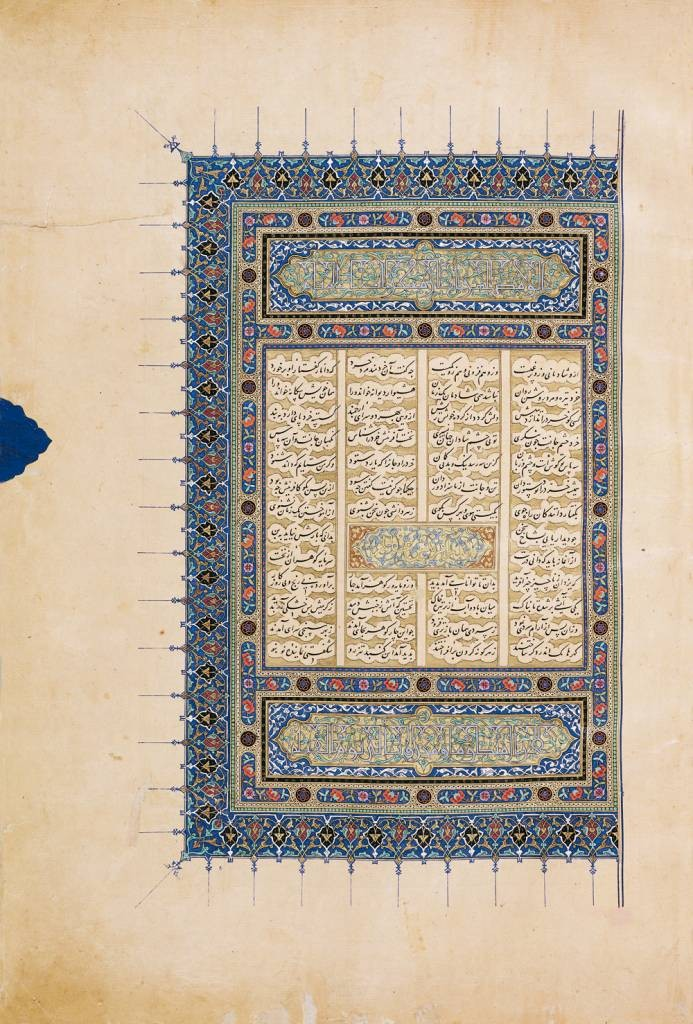
Frontispiece of the Baysonghor Shahnameh. Herat, 1430. Golestan Palace Library

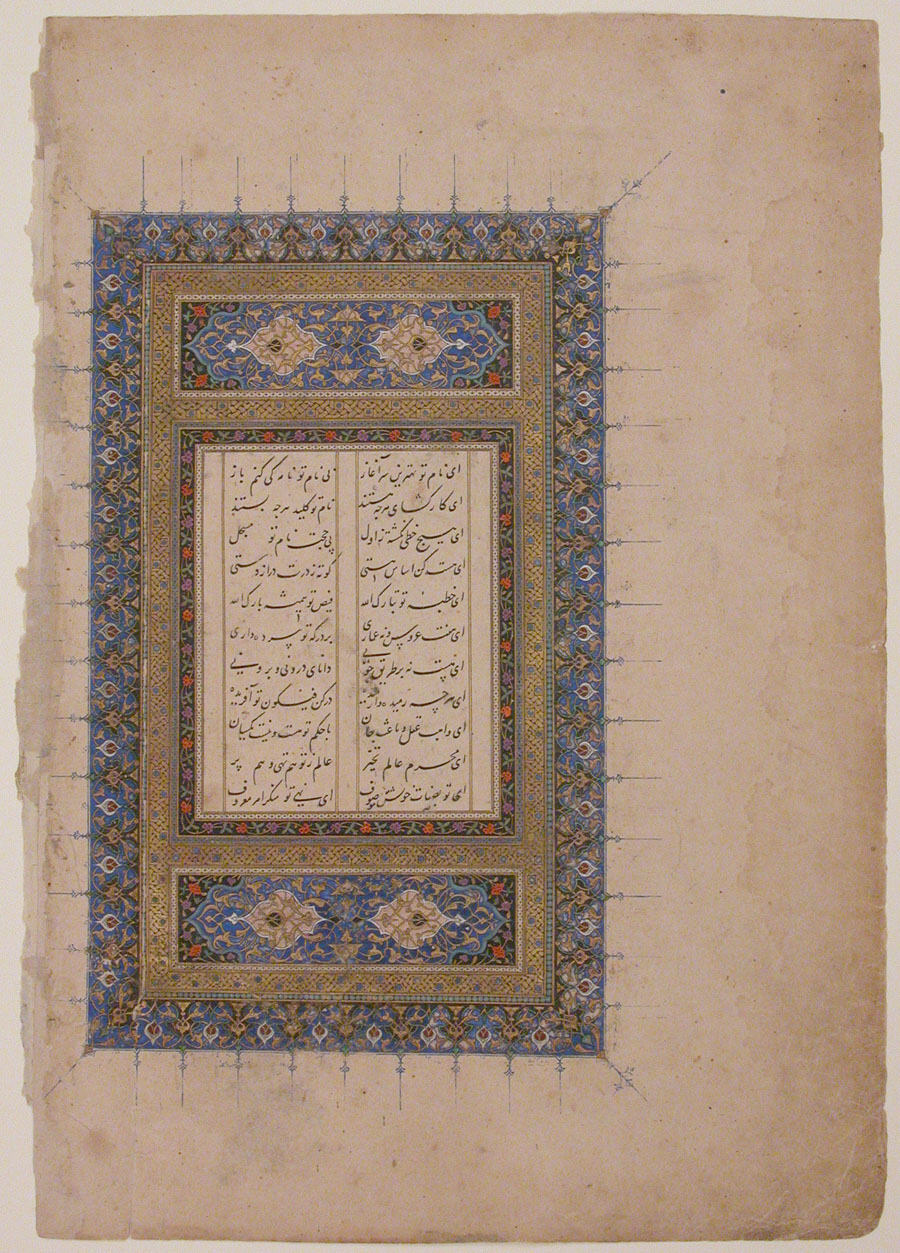
Opening Page from Khamsa of Nizami. Herat, 1431/32. Metropolitan Museum of Art

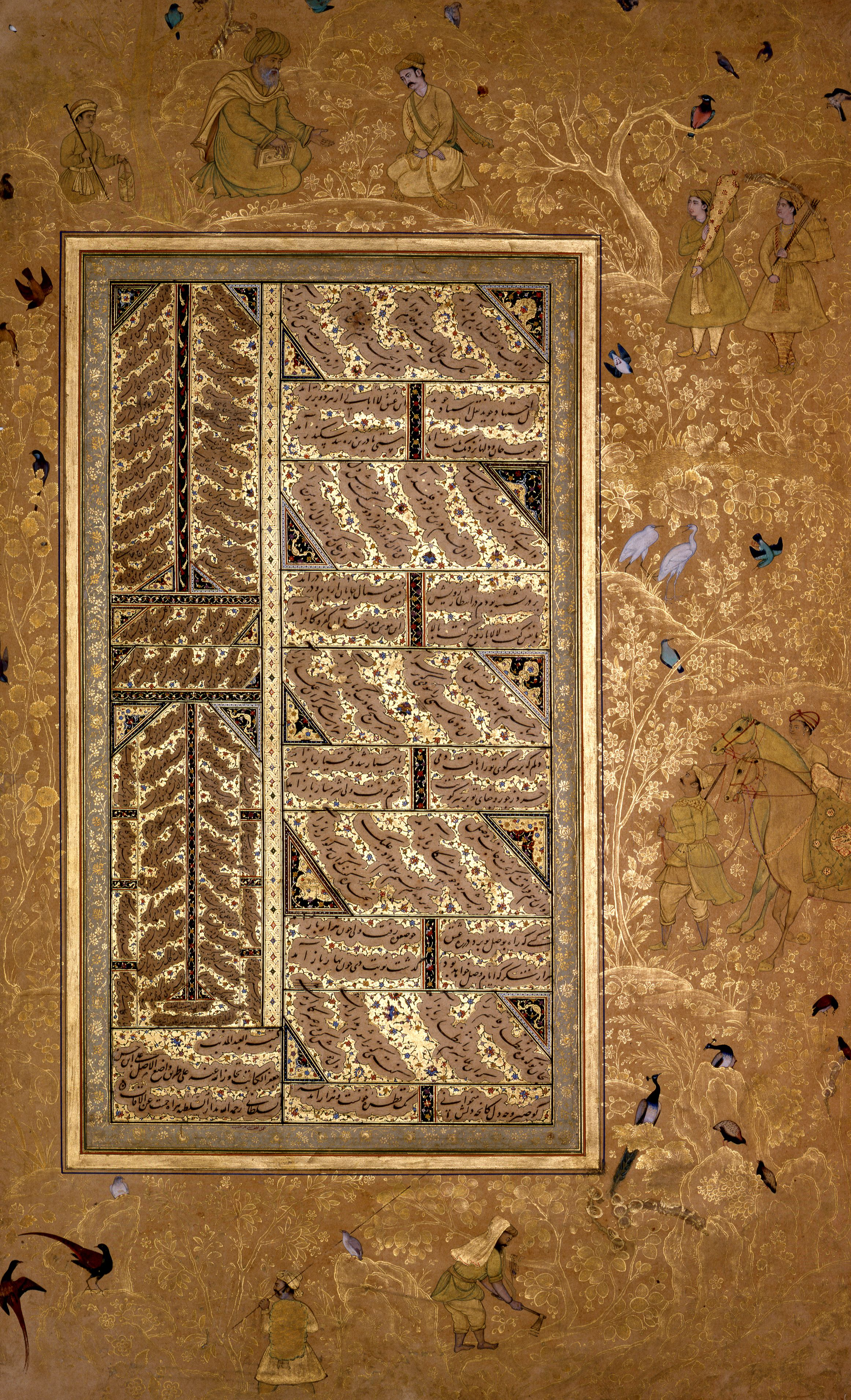
Calligraphy mounted in Muraqqa-e Gulshan. Golestan Palace Library

== Bibliography ==
- Akimushkin, O. F. (March 1997). "The Library-Workshop (kitābkhāna) of Bāysunghur-Mīrzā in Herat". Manuscripta Orientalia. 3 (1): 14–24.
- Hamid Reza Afsari. "Calligraphy". Encyclopaedia Islamica.
- Blair, Sheila (2008). Islamic Calligraphy. Edinburgh University Press. ISBN 978-0748612123.
- Rettig, Simon (2017). "Jaʿfar Tabrizi, „Second Inventor" of the Nastaʿlīq Script, and the Diez Albums". In Gonnella, Julia; Weis, Friederike; Rauch, Christopher (eds.). The Diez Albums. Leiden: Brill. pp. 194–217. ISBN 9789004323483.
- Wheeler M. Thackston (2003). "Ja'far". Grove Art Online. doi:10.1093/gao/9781884446054.article.T043217.
