= Malek Deylami =

Persian calligrapher (1518–1562)

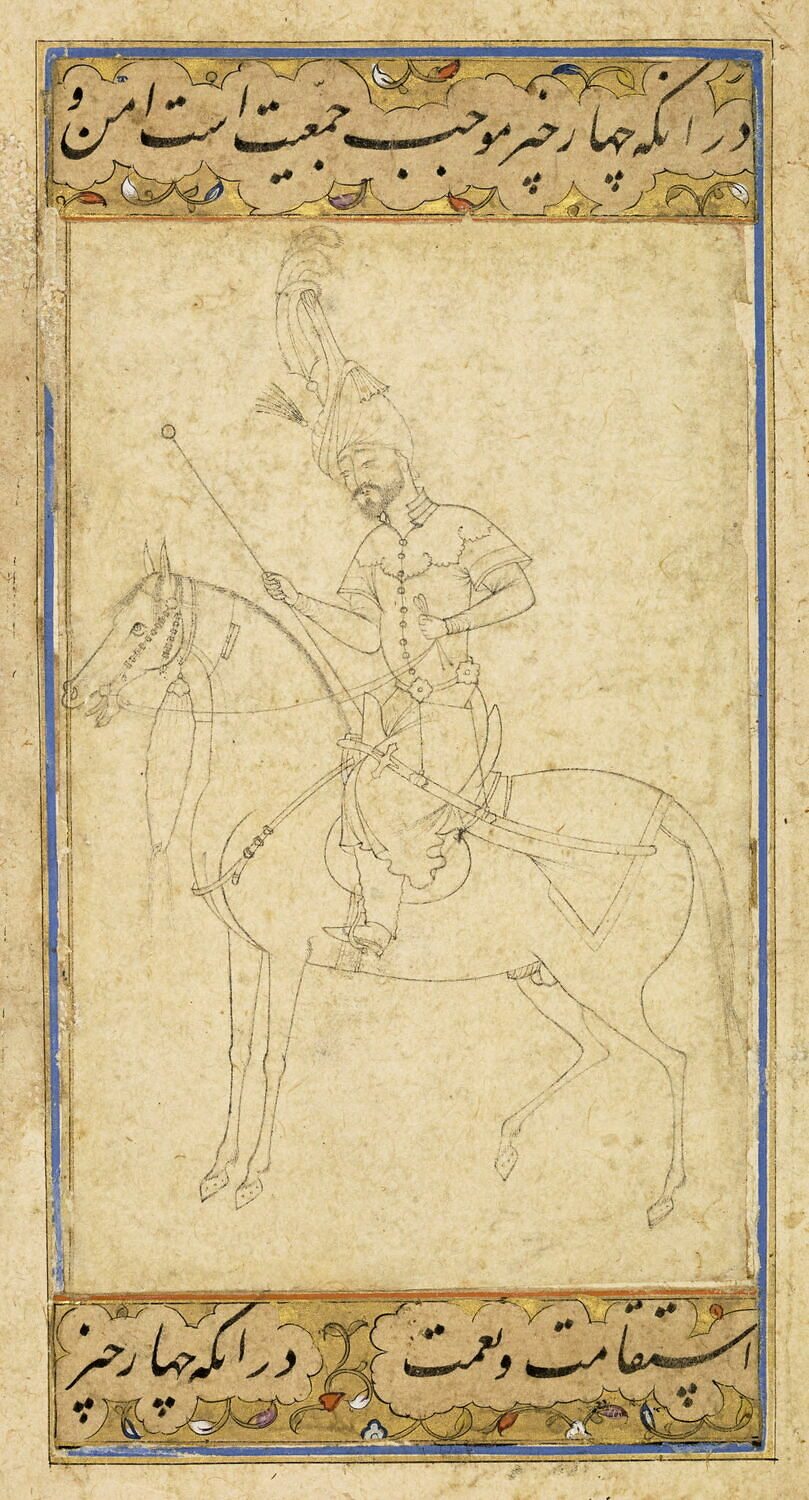
Calligraphy by Malek Deylami, around a presumed equestrian portrait of Tahmasp I (1525-1550). Louvre Museum OA 7138.

Molana Malek Deylami (1518 – 1562) was a Persian scrivener and calligrapher in the 16th century. He was born and died in Qazvin. He was a skillful Nastaliq calligrapher, who wrote bold and fine scripts skillfully.

== Biography ==
Deylami's first teacher was his father, Shohreh Amir, who taught him Thuluth and Naskh. Later, when Rostam Ali Khorassani and Hafez Baba Jan went to Qazvin, he learnt Nastaliq from them. Molana Malek was the teacher of the Safavid prince, Abolfazl Soltan Ibrahim Mirza, an art lover from the house of Safavids. He was not an ambitious man and, for that reason, was a favorite of Tahmasp I.

Mirza married the Shah's daughter, Gohar Solatn, in 1556. He was appointed governor of Mashhad, where was the living and burial place of his father. Mirza took Molana Malek as the painting teacher and curator of his library to Mashhad, but after 3 or 4 years he was called back to Qazvin by Tahmasp I for writing and inscription on the new royal building; This was no later than 1561. During this time, he wrote the manuscript of Jami's Haft Awrang, which became one of the most famous manuscripts. This manuscript is kept in Freer Gallery of Art in Washington D. C. Writing this book with its 28 miniatures took nine years and Deylami's successors finished the calligraphy of the book.

== Students ==
- Mir Emad, Nastaliq calligrapher
- Mohammad Hossein Tabrizi
- Soltan Ibrahim Mirza

== Sources ==
- Daylami, Malik; Muhammad, Sultan (1525). "Louvre Museum. Portrait équestre présumé de Shah Tahmasp".
