= Rihan =

Rihan may refer to:

== Places ==
- Al Rihan, village located in the southern part of Lebanon, on Al Rehan mountain in Jezzine District
- Rihan, Iran (disambiguation), various places in Iran
- Qatrat al-Rihan, a village in northern Syria
- Umm ar-Rihan, a Palestinian village

== People ==
- Bahaeddine Rihan (born 1979), Sudanese footballer
- Rihaan Patel (born 1988), Indian filmmaker

== See also ==
- Rehan (disambiguation)
- Reyhan (disambiguation)
- Rihand
- Rihanna (disambiguation)
- Rijan (disambiguation)
