= Rihanna (disambiguation) =

Rihanna (born 1988) is a Barbadian singer.

Rihanna or Rihana may also refer to:

- Rihanna (book), a book by Rihanna and Simon Henwood
- "Rihanna" (Orezi song) (2013)
- "Rihanna" (Yxng Bane song) (2017)
- "Rihanna", a 2014 song by Clean Bandit from New Eyes
- "Rihanna", a song by Yo Gotti featuring Young Thug
- Rihana, Hama, a village in Syria
- Sami Rihana (born 1941), Lebanese army officer and historian

== See also ==
- Rhiana, given name
- Rhianna, given name
- Rehana (disambiguation), variant spelling of the given name
- Rhiannon (disambiguation)
- Riana (disambiguation)
