= Reyhan =

Reyhan may refer to:

== Places ==
- Al Rihan, a small village in Lebanon, also called Rihan, on a mountain called Al Rehan
- Um ar-Rehan, a Palestinian village
- Reihan, an Israeli settlement
- Reyhan-e Olya, a village in Khomeyn County, Markazi Province, Iran
- Reyhan-e Sofla, a village in Khomeyn County, Markazi Province, Iran
- Reyhan, East Azerbaijan, a village in East Azerbaijan Province, Iran
- Reyhan, Fars, a village in Fars Province, Iran
- Reyhan, Kerman, a village in Kerman Province, Iran
- Reyhan, Khuzestan, a village in Khuzestan Province, Iran
- Reyhan, Markazi, a village in Delijan County, Markazi Province, Iran
- Reyhan, Razavi Khorasan, a village in Razavi Khorasan Province, Iran
- Reyhan, Zanjan, a village in Zanjan Province, Iran

== Other ==
- Reyhan (name), list of people with the name
- Reyhan (script), one of the six canonical scripts of Perso-Arabic calligraphy
- Daughter of the mountains – Reyhan (song), Azerbaijani folk song

== See also ==
- Rehan (disambiguation)
- Rehana (disambiguation)
