= Letters of Light =

2017 book by J. R. Osborn

Letters of Light: Arabic Script in Calligraphy, Print, and Digital Design
- Cover
- Author: J.R. Osborn
- Language: English
- Subject: Arabic script, Arabic calligraphy, history of books, history of printing, typography, digital typography, character encoding
- Genre: Non-fiction
- Publisher: Harvard University Press
- Publication date: 2017
- Publication place: United States
- Media type: Print (hardcover), ebook
- Pages: 280
- ISBN: 978-0-674-97112-7
- Dewey Decimal: 492.7/1109
- LC Class: PJ6123 .O83 2017

Letters of Light: Arabic Script in Calligraphy, Print, and Digital Design is a 2017 non-fiction book by the American media historian and communication scholar J.R. Osborn.

The book is a history of Arabic script. Osborn reveals three technological transitions: the tenth-century formalization of the proportional system al-khatt al-mansub (الخط المنسوب), the introduction of movable-type printing in Europe and the Ottoman Empire, and the adoption of digital computing and the Unicode Standard.

Osborn argues that Arabic letters are designed artifacts that cannot be understood apart from the technologies that transmit them. He addresses both historians of the Middle East and contemporary designers working with Arabic script. The book was a joint winner of the 2018 British–Kuwait Friendship Society Book Prize and received an honorable mention for the Middle East Studies Association's 2018 Albert Hourani Book Award.

== Background ==
The book, by Osborn's account, emerged from two separate starting points, a personal one and an academic one. The personal one began shortly after his undergraduate studies, while he was teaching English in Istanbul. Walking through the city, he noticed that its Greek and Ottoman-era Arabic inscriptions remained visible and culturally legible even though, following Turkey's 1928 adoption of the Latin alphabet, most of his Turkish interlocutors could no longer read the Arabic. The observation turned his attention to writing as a visual medium distinct from spoken language. The academic prompt came during his graduate studies in communication at the University of California, San Diego, where he found that standard histories of the printing revolution and of digital computing were organized around European and American developments. He proposed a ten-century counterpart centred on a non-Latin script, following Arabic from manuscript to print and from print to digital computing, so that the same transitions could be read from within the Arabic tradition rather than the Latin one. Osborn described the organization of the book as built around a cast of characters in two senses: the letters and styles of Arabic script themselves, and the scribes, printers, and digital designers who produced them. He also explained the title as a pun joining the older association of letters with illumination (including the connotations of divine light attached to Arabic and Qur'anic letters) with the fact that characters on contemporary screens are materially composed of light.

== Summary ==
Osborn identifies three technological transitions during the development of Arabic script: the tenth-century formalization of al-khatt al-mansub (proportional script, الخط المنسوب) in Abbasid Baghdad, the uneven adoption of European movable-type printing, and the passage of Arabic into digital typography and the Unicode Standard. He presents them as enfolded into one another rather than as discrete phases. The continuous thread is the naskh family of styles, dominant in Arab and Ottoman Muslim scribal practice and still the commonest form of Arabic script in print and online; The calligraphy examined is that of the Abbasid, Ottoman and Gulf courts rather than of everyday signwriting or documents, and related traditions such as Kufic, maghribi and nasta'liq appear only as foils. Osborn views Arabic script as a designed visual technology. He analyses its grammar using a seven-layer model adapted from the type designer Thomas Milo in which a skeleton of letter shapes (rasm) is successively modified by pointing (i'jaam), vocalization (tashkil), cantillation marks and ornamentation.

In the first chapter, the author sets the proportional system of the vizier Ibn Muqlah (measured against the rhombic dot (nuqta) of a reed pen, "just as it was revealed to the bees how to make the cells of their honeycombs hexagonal") alongside its refinement by Ibn al-Bawwab, who extended naskh to Qur'anic copying, and Yaqut al-Musta'simi, credited with canonizing the six classical pens (al-aqlam al-sittah).

In the second chapter, Osborn reads Ottoman scribes such as Şeyh Hamdullah and Hafız Osman as designers who matched styles (Note: muhaqqaq, thuluth, naskh, ta'liq and diwani) to content, medium and audience, much like the ways in which contemporary typographers choose fonts.

Two chapters on print contrast the rapid marriage of the printed Bible with Reformation Europe against the partial adaptation of Arabic to movable type, from Erhard Reuwich's 1486 woodcut alphabet through the 1514 Kitab Salat al-Sawa'i and the Paganini "Qur'an" of the 1530s. Osborn argues that European presses parcelled cursive Arabic into metal sorts and concretized the four-form model of isolated, initial, medial and final variants, while the Ottoman Müteferrika press of 1727 cast Arabic type as an administrative and secular tool, and the apparent "delay" of Ottoman printing is reframed as the consequence of a durable scribal system rather than of religious objection.

Osborn addresses twentieth-century script reform (Note: Such as Turkey's 1928 adoption of a Latinate alphabet under Mustafa Kemal Atatürk, the inconclusive 1940s–1950s competition of the Academy of the Arabic Language in Cairo, Nasri Khattar's Unified Arabic Alphabet, Ahmed Lakhdar-Ghazal's ASV-Codar, and the role of lithography in preserving the handwritten line) followed by Arabic's passage into computing, from typewriter-era reforms to Unicode's encoding of the letters and diacritical marks of Arabic script. The chapter includes case studies of the Khatt Foundation's 2007 Typographic Matchmaking project and Milo's DecoType Advanced Composition Engine, which algorithmically draws the cursive naskh line rather than assembling pre-designed glyphs. A coda, "Beyond Arabic," argues that features heralded as novel in digital typography, such as large glyph repertoires, animation, or context-sensitive forms, were structural necessities of Arabic script long before they became options for Latin.

== Critics ==
Natalia Suit described the book as an elegantly written technical history of Arabic script. Suit focused on the author's central argument (Note: That Arabic letters do not change independently of the technologies that transmit them.) as the feature distinguishing the work from earlier attempts on Arabic calligraphy. She also praised the treatment of script as a material and communicative practice rather than "art for art sake."

Petra Sijpesteijn called the work "a valuable achievement and a commendable attempt to introduce the large and important field of Arabic writing and printing to designers in the West." However, Sijpesteijn questioned the focus on the elite calligraphy of the court and luxury markets. She argued that it took no account of the diversity of everyday written production, such as signwriting, documents, letters, handbills, which in her view constituted "a vibrant tradition in their own right." Tracing developments through Baghdad, Istanbul and the Gulf, she noticed, inevitably missed later cities such as Cairo, Damascus and Beirut, and led to the absence of the Nahda, the late-nineteenth- and early-twentieth-century Arabic cultural revival that she considered consequential for Arabic printing.

In her review, Hala Hawatmeh called the book an "invaluable resource for understanding the intricacies of various Arabic scripts and styles, both old and new." However, she also warned that the density of detail could tax novices, and wrote that "even as a native Arabic speaker" she had been "challenged to keep up with the myriad of terms being introduced within the complex system of design spanning centuries of history."

Peter Webb wrote a review essay of the book for the Times Literary Supplement, reviewing it alongside Sheila Blair and Jonathan Bloom's edited volume By the Pen and What They Write, which he called "a refreshing and rewarding approach to understanding deeply embedded and cherished cultural values of Islamic lands." Webb credited Osborn with "incisive arguments" linking the halting progress of Arabic print technology to both the technical difficulty of reproducing ligatures and "print's abiding failure to attain the long-established aesthetic standards of cursive Arabic." He said that the book's handling of calligraphic mythology revealed "the nearly magical esteem for writing in Arabic culture."

The Albert Hourani Book Award committee called the book "lucid and groundbreaking" for showing how scribal traditions carried over into Arabic mass media.

The British–Kuwait Friendship Society panel cited the book's accessibility. Chair Frances Guy quoted a reviewer who described it as the product of "decades of profound thought and dedicated research."

== Awards ==
- The 2018 British–Kuwait Friendship Society Book Prize (a joint winner)
- The 2018 Albert Hourani Book Award (honorable mention)
