= Al-Anfal =

8th chapter of the Qur'an

Surah 8 of the Quran
ٱلْأَنْفَال Al-Anfāl The Bounties
- Qira'ah; English text
- Classification: Medinan
- Position: Juzʼ 9—10
- Hizb no.: 15—19
- No. of verses: 75
- No. of Rukus: 10
- No. of words: 1242
- No. of letters: 5387

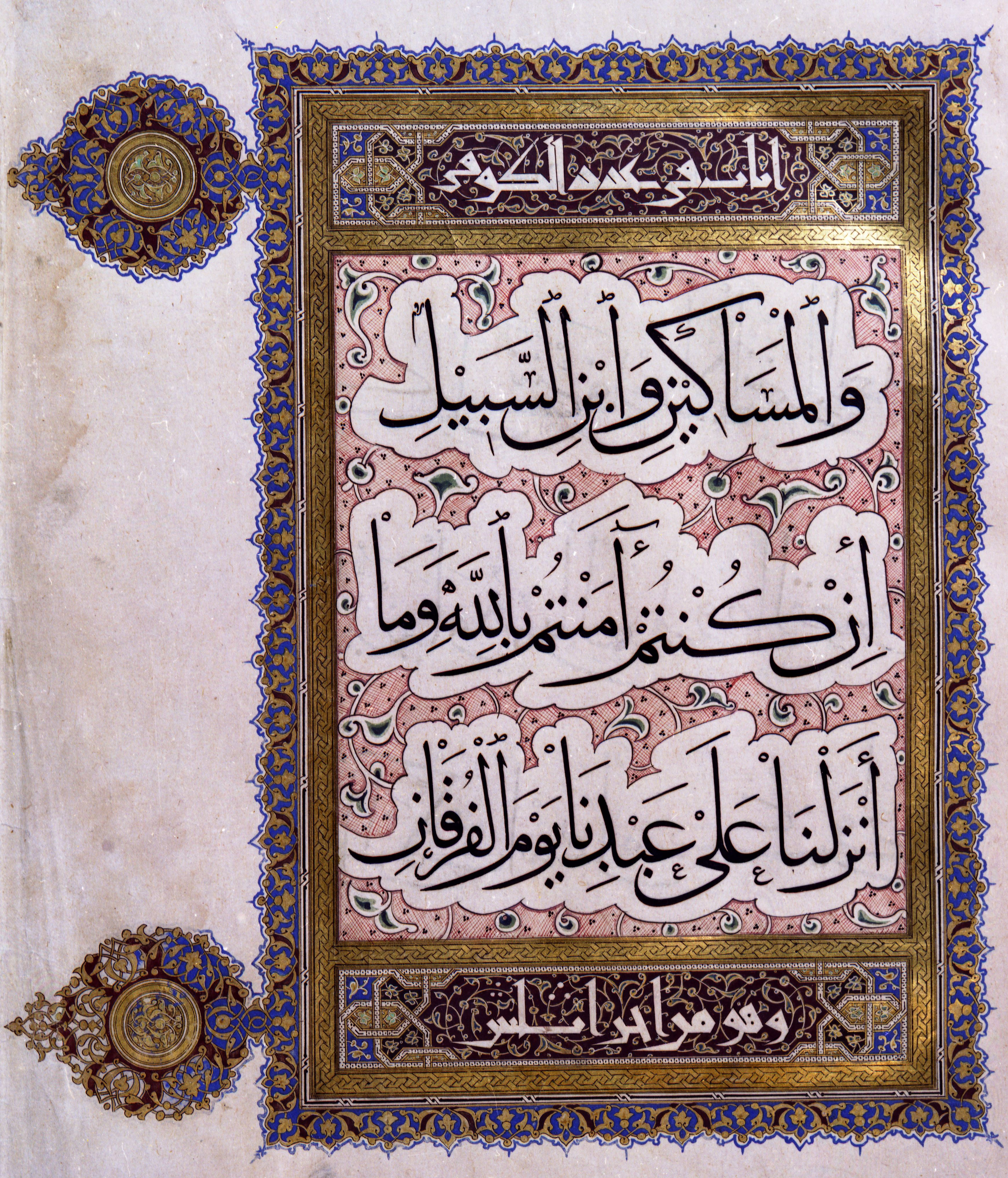
Opening page from the juz' 10 of the Qur'an copied by Ahmad al-Suhrawardi, with verse 41 of the chapter Al-Anfal. Baghdad, ca. 1305–1307. Museum of the Islamic Era

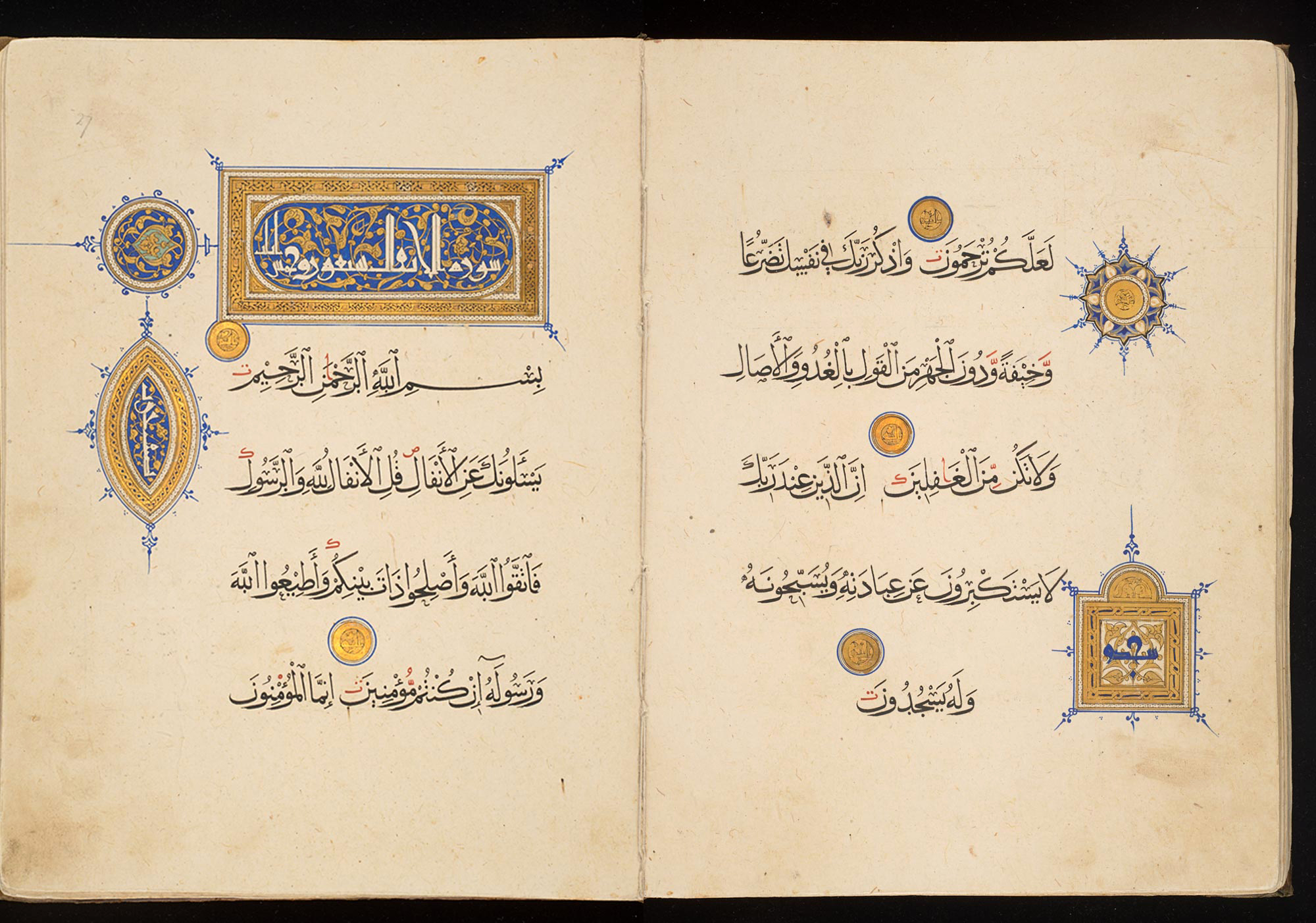
Double-page from the Sultan Barquq's Qur'an with heading for chapter Al-Anfal. Rayhani script. Cairo, c. 1370 - 1375. British Library

Al-Anfal (Arabic: ٱلأنفال, al-ʾanfāl; meaning The Spoils of War, Earnings, Savings, Profits) is the eighth chapter (sūrah) of the Quran, with 75 verses (āyāt). Regarding the timing and contextual background of the revelation (asbāb al-nuzūl), it is a Medinan surah, completed after the Battle of Badr. It forms a pair with the next surah, At-Tawba.

According to the Muslim philosopher Abul A'la Maududi, the chapter was probably revealed in 2 AH (624 CE) after the Battle of Badr, the first defensive clash between the Meccans and the Muslim people of Medina after they fled from persecution in Mecca. As it contains an extensive point-by-point survey of the battle, it gives the idea that most presumably it was revealed at very much the same time. Yet, it is additionally conceivable that a portion of the verses concerning the issues emerging because of this battle may have been revealed later and placed at the best possible spots to make it consistent entirely.

== Summary ==
- 1 Spoils belong to God and his Apostle
- 2-4 True believers and their future reward
- 5-6 Muslims reproved for distrusting their Prophet
- 7 God gives the Muslims either the Quraish or their caravan
- 8 The victory of Badr a seal to Islam
- 9 Angelic aid vouchsafed to Muhammad
- 10-11 The Muslims refreshed and comforted before the battle
- 12 The angels enjoined to comfort the faithful by destroying the infidel Quraish
- 13-14 Infidels are doomed to punishment here and hereafter
- 15-16 Muslims are never to turn their backs on the infidels on pain of hell-fire
- 17-18 The victory of Badr a miracle
- 19 The Quraish are warned against further warfare with the Muslims
- 20-21 Muslims exhorted to steadfastness in faith
- 22-23 Infidels compared to deaf and dumb brutes
- 24 Believers are to submit themselves to God and his Apostle
- 25-28 They are warned against civil strife, deception, and treachery
- 29 God's favour to true believers
- 30 Plots against Muhammad frustrated by God
- 31 The infidels liken the Quran to fables
- 32-33 The Quraish were protected from deserved punishment by Muhammad's presence among them
- 34-38 The idolaters of Mecca rebuked and threatened
- 39 An amnesty offered to the Quraish
- 40 Impenitent idolaters to be extirpated from the earth
- 41 How the spoils of war are to be divided
- 42-43 The Muslims were led by God to fight at Badr to attest the truth of Islam
- 44 The Muslims encouraged, and the infidels lured to destruction, by each seeing the other to be few in number
- 45-46 Believers exhorted to obedience
- 47 Believers warned against impious vainglory
- 48 The devil deserts the Quraish at Badr
- 49-51 The fate of hypocrites
- 52-54 Their doom like that of Pharaoh and his people
- 55 The worst of beasts are the infidels
- 56-58 Treachery to be met with its like
- 59 God is against the infidels
- 60 The Muslims excited to war against unbelievers
- 61 Condition of peace with unbelievers
- 62-64 The miracle of Arab union
- 65-66 God with the Prophet and the Muslims in warring for the faith
- 67-69 Muslims reproved for accepting ransom for the captives taken at Badr
- 70-71 Captive Quraish exhorted to accept Islam, and warned against deception
- 72-73 The brotherhood of Muslims (and its obligatory related to it), fact that disbelievers are helpers of one another, and effect for Muslims if they don't help another.
- 74 The brotherhood of the Ansárs and Muhajirun
- 75 The hereditary rights of blood-relations re-established

== Name ==
The Surah is named Al-Anfal (The Bounties) from the first ayat. The word utilized in the ayat is الْأَنفَالِ. The word أَنفَال alludes to what is given as an extra sum past what is required. A very subtle perspective is covered in employing this word: the reward of undertaking jihad for God is permanently saved with God. Other than this prize, the spoils of war that are picked up from the Unbelievers are an extra offer for such individuals; before the Day of Judgment, the Almighty awards these to the participants of the war.

== Text narratives ==
This subject of this Surah can be considered to be the issue of Jihad.

| Ayaat | Subject |
|---|---|
| 1 | This verse speaks about the distribution of prizes of war. Further details regarding the revelation of this verse from Hadiths narrated by Zubayr ibn al-Awwam and Miqdad ibn Aswad became the foundation of Sharia ruling by the four main Sunni Madhhabregarding the rules of war. (Note: During the distribution of spoils of war after the battle of Yarmuk az-Zubayr demanded that he should be given fifth times of the spoils of war which he argue by the ruling he gotfrom Muhammad once give az-Zubayr five parts from the 4/5 of the whole spoils of war during the battle of Khaybar for his service as cavalry man, which also supported by Jabir ibn Abdillah al-Ansari as the latter testified he witnessed the spoils distribution in Khaybar. Although his demand were challenged by Miqdad ibn Aswad, who favored the horsemens should be given two parts instead, based on his own experience, that after the battle of Badr, when both az-Zubayr and Miqdad the only horse riders in Muslim army were given two parts by Muhammad, which az-Zubayr cannot deny.) (Note: The hadith were included in record of Ibn Manzur record of Miqdad ibn Aswad biography in his book, brief history of Damascus) |
| 2-8 | |
| 9 | These verses are agreed by Tafsir scholars to be about the story of the battle of Badr, where thousands of angels descended and took the size and form of normal humans to help Muslims in the battle against the Meccan polytheists. According to Ibn Hajar al-Asqalani, the asbab al-Nuzul (the historical context of the revelation of this verse) was the solemn prayer which Muhammad does just before the battle. The phrase of "...thousand angels came in a row..." was translated literally as the angels, according to Ibn Hajar, came with the appearance of an army of soldiers clad in white garments. The garments were translated by other scholars as yellow, as more specific sources have stated that the angels took the form of Zubayr ibn al-Awwam, companion of Muhammad. (Note: According to one Hadith, Muhammad were told that the angels that appeared in the battle of Badr were highest in status and the "best of angels" according to Gabriel.) The consensus of Islamic scholars and clerics enclosed various hadiths, both authenticsand inauthentic, about the tafseer of this verses that Gabriel, Michael, Raphael (Note: found in Mustadrak al Sahihayn. The complete narration from Al-Hakim al-Nishapuri were:... Abu Abdullah Muhammad bin Yaqoub has reported from Ibrahim bin Abdullah Al-Saadi, who told us Muhammad bin Khalid bin Uthma, told us Musa bin Yaqoub, told me Abu Al-Huwairith, that Muhammad bin Jubayr bin Mut'im told him, that he heard Ali - may God be pleased with him - addresses the people, and he said: While I was leaving from the well of Badr, a strong wind came, the like of which I had never seen, then it left, then came a strong wind, the like of which I have never seen except for the one before it, then it went, then came a strong wind that I did not see before. I have never seen anything like it except for the one before it, and the first wind was Gabriel descended among a thousand angels with the Messenger of God - may God bless him and grant him peace - and the second wind was Michael who descended among a thousand angels to the right of the Messenger of God - may God bless him and his family and grant them peace - and Abu Bakr was On his right, and the third wind was Israfil. He descended with a thousand angels on the side of the Messenger of God - may God's prayers and peace be upon him and his family - and I was on the right side. When God Almighty defeated his enemies, the Messenger of God - may God's prayers and peace be upon him and his family - carried me on his horse, I blew up, and I fell On my heels, I prayed to God Almighty... Ibn al Mulqin, Hadith scholar from Cordoba of 13-14 AD century, evaluate this hadith tha he found weaknesses in Musa ibn Yaqoub and Abu al Huwairith chain, so he deemed there is weakness about this hadith. However, recent scholarship from Ali Hasan al-Halabi has noted there is another hadith which supported the participation of Raphael in Badr) (Note: According to Islamic belief in weak chain of Hadith, Raphael were acknowledged as angel who were tasked to blower of Armageddon trumpet, and one of archangels who bear the Throne of God on their back.) and thousands of best angels from the third level of sky, all came to the battle of Badr by taking on the appearance of Zubayr ibn al-Awwam, companion of Muhammad. (Note: According to one Hadith, Muhammad were told that the angels that appeared in the battle of Badr were highest in status and the "best of angels" according to Gabriel.) are deemed as his other personal virtue and venerable status according to Islamic belief. (Note: According to one narration, during the battle, Muhammad has found an angel whom he though as Zubayr standing next to him, which then prompted Muhammad to command him to attack, which the angel, in Zubayr appearance, simply replied, "I am not Zubayr." Thus, according to Hadith expert this another indication that the angels truly came down with the appearance of Zubayr during Badr.) Meanwhile, Mahdi Rizqullah has compiled the commentary from classical Islamic scholars, that the verse narration about the angels attendance in the battle were also supported by hadiths from hadith collection from Muslim ibn Hajjaj, Ahmad ibn Hanbal, and the also from Quranic historiography work by Ibn Kathir. Muhammad Nasiruddin al-Albani gave commentary of another supportive narration from al-Baihaqi and Ibn Ishaq, through various hadith narration chains about the testimony from several different sahabah. This included the narration of Abbas ibn Abd al-Muttalib who at that time fought on the side of Qurayshite polytheist, who testified that he has been taken captive on the aftermath of the battle by a horse rider whom he did not recognize at all from Muslims rank. According to the hadith authority from Ahmad ibn Hanbal, The captor of Abbas were confirmed by Muhammad as one of the angel who helped the Muslims during this battle. (Note: Biography of the Prophet An Analytical Study Based on Authentic Sources by Mahdi Rizqullah which published in Indonesian language were praised by Jonathan E. Brockopp from Cambridge University Press for providing more details of Prophetic biography narration which does not offered by Mohammed Hussein Heikal biography works.) |
| 10-12 | The verses are continuation of the previous verse of ninth, where according to the verses, this are done to gave Muslim victory for the price of their faith in following Muhammad into the battle. |
| 13-41 | This portion manages the issues of the Spoils of War or ghanimah. The Quran says that these are not the crown jewels of war but rather the "Bounties of Allah" and demonstrates this by indicating that the triumph at Badr (and in every single other fight, as well,) was won by His aid and not by the endeavors of the Muslims. It likewise proclaims in ayat 40 that the war point of the Muslims ought to be to take out every single troublesome condition for the foundation of Islam and not to pick up ruins. Additionally, the spoils, being the bounties of God, have a place with Allah and His Messenger and only they are qualified to distribute them. At that point in the wake of molding the Muslims to acknowledge these things, the different shares have been assigned in ayat 41. The portion for relatives of Muhammad were attested by Hadith that Zubayr ibn al-Awwam, a cousin relative of Muhammad from the side of his father, were shared with more war prize during the battle of Badr. |
| 41 | Know that whatever spoils you take, one-fifth is for Allah and the Messenger, his close relatives, orphans, the poor, and ˹needy˺ travellers,.. — ^{[Quran 8:41]} This verse concerns the division of war spoils by the relatives of Muhammad. The Modern Hanbalite and salafists borrowed the interpretation of the verse from Ibn Kathir and Al-Baghawi, that Zubayr privilege were valid as he still counted as blood relative of Muhammad through az-Zubayr mother, so aside from the three parts which usually given to cavalry, two more parts of spoils were given to Zubayr for his blood relation with the prophet. |
| 42-49 | The Battle of Badr was appointed by Allah so Islam should triumph over "ignorance". The exercise from this is the Muslims should trust in God and set themselves up for war and ought not be bewildered by Satan as the disbelievers were. |
| 50 | The verse giving special mention regarding the conduct of the Angel of death that during the Battle of Badr, the angel of death gave special treatment for the unbelievers who died during that battle, where the angel torment them by striking their faces and their backs the moment they are dying. Another opinion said those polytheists died in Badr were given the treatment not at that time, instead, they will be struck with such punishments during the Last Judgment. |
| 51-54 | The Battle of Badr was appointed by Allah so Islam should triumph over "ignorance". The exercise from this is the Muslims should trust in God and set themselves up for war and ought not be bewildered by Satan as the disbelievers were. |
| 55-59 | Sanctity of treaties has been ordered and the Muslims instructed to observe them as long as the other party does not break them. |
| 60-66 | The Muslims ought to consistently be set up for war on each front, yet ought to be prepared to make harmony if the other party is slanted towards it. |
| 67-71 | In these ayaat, guidelines about detainees of war have been given. |
| 72-75 | To keep the Muslims consolidated against their adversaries, they have been instructed to have welcoming relations with each other. |

=== Verse 8:12 ===
˹Remember, O Prophet,˺ when your Lord revealed to the angels, "I am with you. So make the believers stand firm. I will cast horror into the hearts of the disbelievers. So strike their necks and strike their fingertips."

— 8:12

Tafsir Ibn Kathir says this means, "you -- angels -- support the believers, strengthen their (battle) front against their enemies, thus, implementing My command to you. I will cast fear, disgrace and humiliation over those who defied My command and denied My Messenger".

=== Verse 8:17 ===
Muhammad al-Baqir narrates in hadith that:

Know that whatever property you may gain, one fifth belongs to God, the Messenger, for near relatives and the orphans, the needy, and the [stranded] traveler

which refers to the relatives of the Messenger of Allah. "Al-Khums (one fifth) belongs to Allah, the Messenger and to us (his Ahl al-Bayt)". One source states that Ubay ibn Khalaf was ransomed after Badr, but was killed by Muslims with a spear in the Battle of Uhud (625 CE). Verse 8:17 was revealed in this occasion.

=== Verses 8:42 and 8:47 ===
The Battle of Badr is also the subject of this Surah, which details military conduct and operations. Though the Surah does not name Badr, it describes the battle several times:

˹Remember˺ when you were on the near side of the valley, your enemy on the far side, and the caravan was below you. Even if the two armies had made an appointment ˹to meet˺, both would have certainly missed it...

— Quran 8:42

Then when your armies met, Allah made them appear as few in your eyes, and made you appear as few in theirs, so Allah may establish what He had destined. And to Allah ˹all˺ matters will be returned ˹for judgment˺.

— Quran 8:44

Do not be like those ˹pagans˺ who left their homes arrogantly, only to be seen by people and to hinder others from Allah's Path. And Allah is Fully Aware of what they do.

— Quran 8:47

These verses highlighted both the chance encounter of the battle (both sides had blundered into each other) as well as the underestimation of both the size of the Meccan army by the Muslims and the fierceness of the Muslim army by the Meccans. The Meccan army was described in the second verses, and "Satan" may be referring to Amr ibn Hishām, who was hated by the Muslims and allegedly pushed for the battle repeatedly.

=== Verses 8:75 ===
According to Al-Suyuti, the aftermath of the battle of Uhud had several implication for the Companions of the Prophet as some of them though they can inherit the wealth of the fallen, due to the previous bonding between Muhajirun and Ansar in the event of Brotherhood among the Sahabah. This case were highlighted in a Hadith of such event when Ka'b ibn Malik, a Medinan Ansari warrior who has fallen during the battle and previously bonded brotherhood with Zubayr ibn al-Awwam. Then Muhammad revealed Sura Al-Anfal, Ayah 8:75, which annulled the inheritance rights between fabricated "brotherhood", and forbidding Zubayr to inherit Ka'b wealths, as the one who truly has the right to inherit his wealth were his true blood relatives such as his children's.

== Appendix ==
=== Bibliography ===
- Abasoomar, Moulana Muhammad; Abasoomar, Moulana Haroon (2016). "Virtue of Sayyiduna Zubayr (radiyallahu 'anhu)". Hadith Answers. Darul Hadith.
- Bin Al-Hassan, Abi Al-Qasim Ali; Al-Dimashqi, Ibn Asaker (2012). تاريخ مدينة دمشق 1-37 ج10 [History of the city of Damascus]. Dar Al Kotob Al Ilmiyah دار الكتب العلمية.
- Rizqullah, Ahmad Mahdi (2005). A Biography of the Prophet of Islam In the Light of the Original Sources, an Analytical Study · Volume 1. Darussalam Publishers. p. 410. ISBN 9789960969022.
