= Anwen =

- Gender: Feminine
- Language: Welsh

Origin
- Meaning: Very beautiful

Anwen is a Welsh feminine name. Notable bearers of the name are:

- Anwen Williams, fictional character in the BBC series Torchwood (daughter of Gwen Cooper and Rhys Williams)
- Anwen Keeling (born 1976), Australian painter
- Anwen Muston, British Labour Party politician

It is not a very common first name, though neither is it rare. However, Anwen is popularly confused with "Arwen", a name created by the author and linguist J. R. R. Tolkien for use in his novel The Lord of the Rings, and modelled on the etymology and sound patterns of Welsh.

The origins of Anwen are somewhat unclear, though the -wen ending is known to represent the mutated form of the adjective gwen (note: the G in gwen is dropped in a mutation of the word as the word follows a consonant), which is the feminine form of gwyn, used to mean "white" as well as "blessed". There are many other dithematic -wen names in use in Wales today, some examples being:

- Arianwen, which is a compound of the Welsh word arian meaning "silver" (possibly also found in Arianrhod) + -wen
- Branwen, formed from Welsh brân "crow" + -wen
- Rhianwen = rhian, a form of rhiain "maiden" (also found in Rhiannon) + -wen
- Tanwen = tân "fire" + -wen

The -wen suffix used in the coining of many modern Welsh girls' names was originally appended to the names of female saints in the sense of "holy" or "blessed", roughly equivalent to English "Saint". Ceinwen ("Saint Cain") is an alternative name for the Welsh saint Cain, for example; cf. also Dwynwen "Saint Dwyn" and Meirwen "Saint Mary (mother of Jesus)".

The initial syllable (An-) is sometimes identified as an intensive prefix, hence "very" or "much" (also found at the beginning of Angharad), and the name in full is commonly interpreted to mean "very beautiful" (a sort of prefixed form of Gwen, in its sense of "pretty, fair"). It could also be inspired by the Welsh term of endearment annwyl, which is used to mean "dear, beloved" (compare the surname Anwyl and the word anwylyd ("darling, loved one"), which is simply annwyl with the addition of the suffix -yd), or the common name Ann.
