= Al-Anbiya =

21st chapter of the Qur'an

Surah 21 of the Quran
الأنبياء Al-Anbiyā The Prophets
- Qira'ah; English text
- Classification: Meccan
- Position: Juzʼ 17
- Hizb no.: 33
- No. of verses: 112
- No. of Rukus: 7
- No. of words: 1323
- No. of letters: 5,094

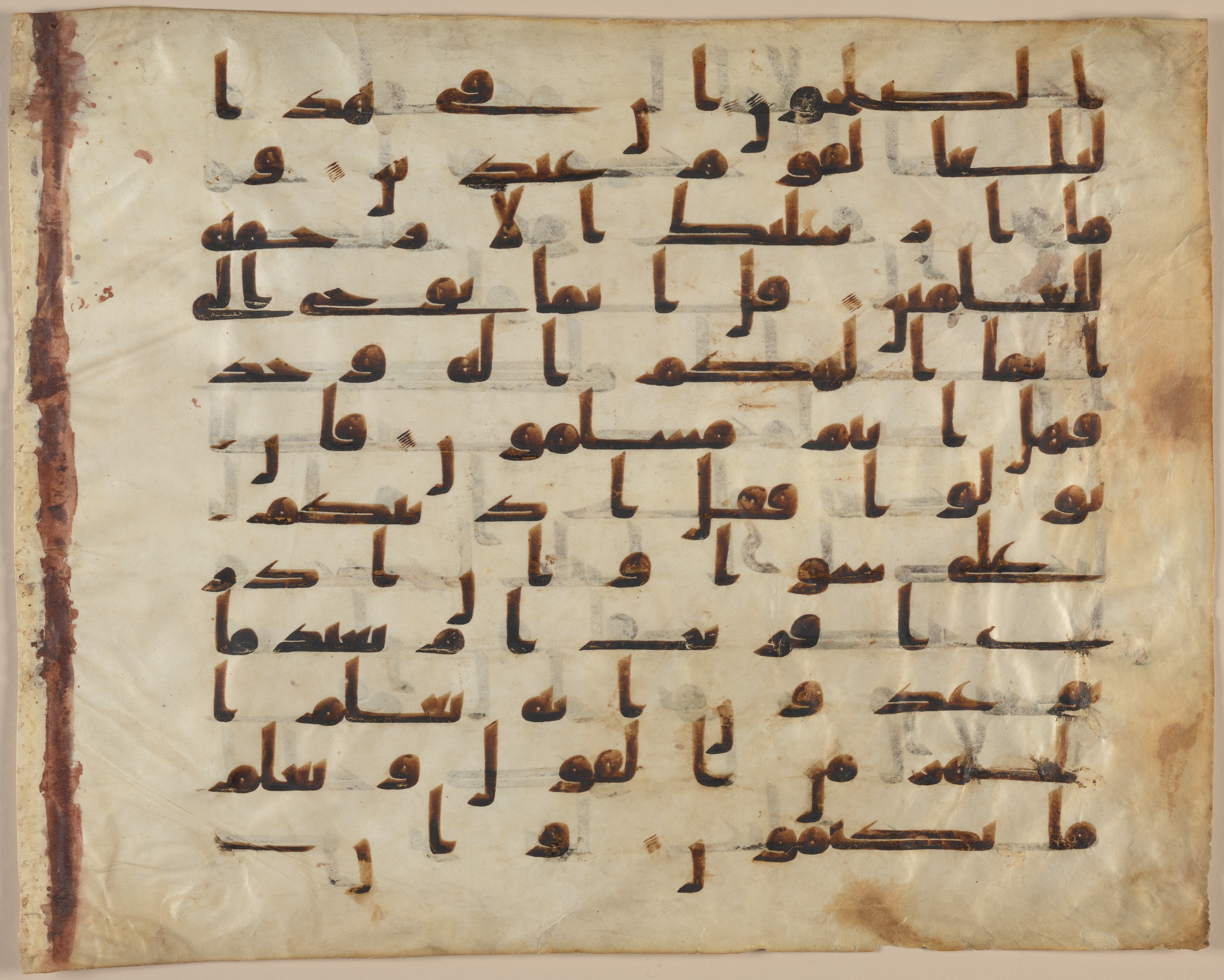
Folio from Samarkand Kufic Quran with surah Al-Anbiya. Late 8th–early 9th century. Metropolitan Museum of Art

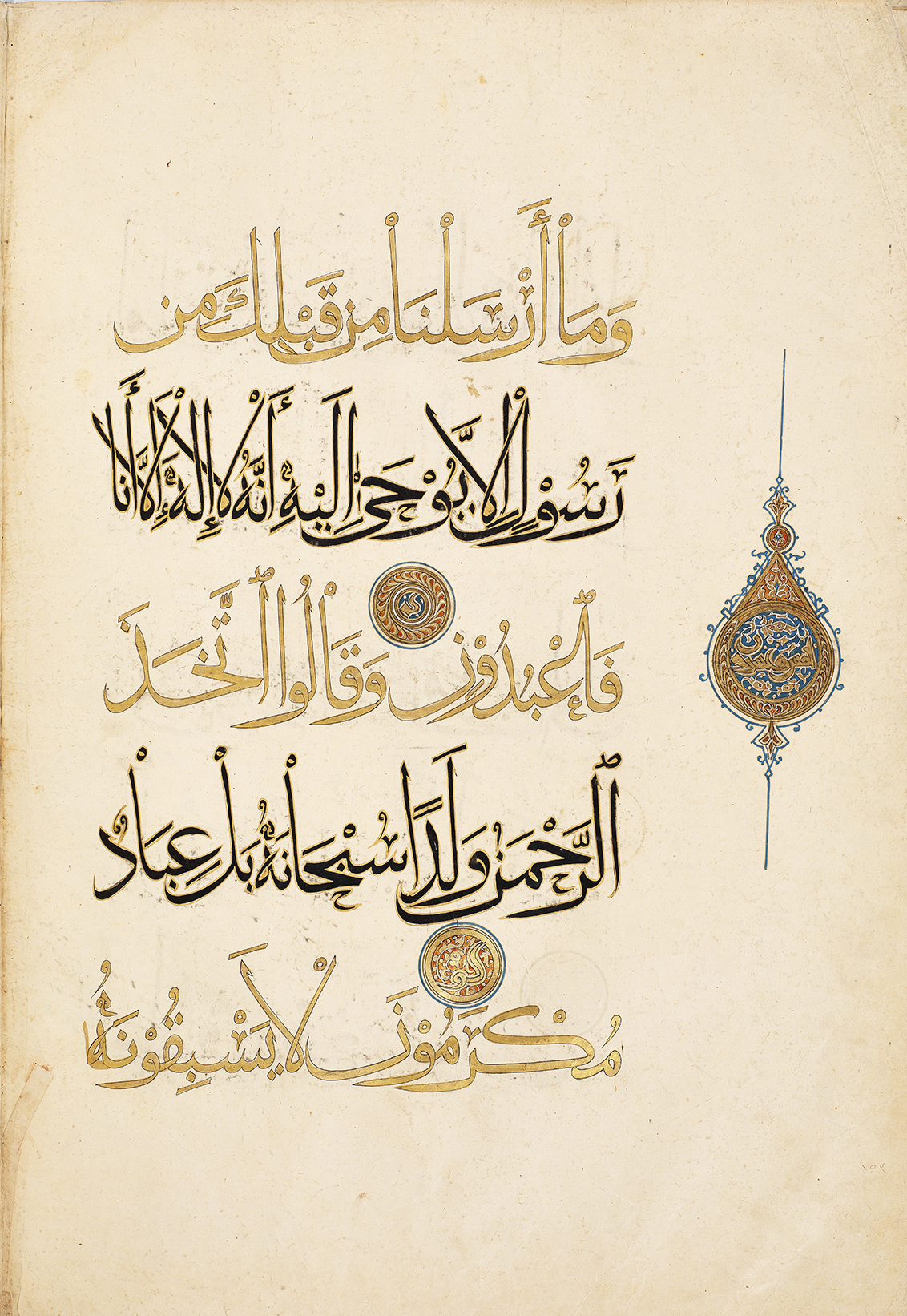
Page from the Qur'an copied by Ahmad al-Suhrawardi (1256-1340) with the fragment of the surah Al-Anbiya (verses 25nn). Illumination by Muhammad ibn Aybak. Muhaqqaq script. Baghdad, year 1307/1308. Turkish and Islamic Arts Museum

Al-Anbiyaʼ (Arabic: الأنبياء, ’al-’anbiyā’; meaning: "The Prophets") is the 21st chapter (sūrah) of the Quran with 112 verses (āyāt). Its principal subject matter is prophets of the past, who also preached the same faith as Muhammad.

Regarding the timing and contextual background of the revelation (asbāb al-nuzūl), it is a "Meccan surah", which means it is believed to have been revealed in Mecca, instead of later in Medina. It was revealed around 2–3 years before Hijrah, in a later stage of Muhammad preaching in Mecca.

== Summary ==
- 1-4 The judgment of careless and mocking Quraysh near
- 5 The Meccan people regard Muhammad as “a forger”
- 6 Former nations did not heed the miracles
- 7-8 The former prophets were but mortal men
- 9 God favors His prophets but judges infidels
- 10 The Quraysh mentioned in the Quran
- 11-15 The unbelieving cities and scoffers destroyed
- 16-17 The heavens and the earth not created in play
- 18 The truth must triumph
- 19-22 Angels serve God, therefore not to be worshipped
- 23 God is sovereign
- 24 The great sin of idolatry
- 25 All apostles testified to God’s unity
- 26 Angels are not the daughters of God but only 'His' honored servants
- 27-28 Angelic intercession only by divine permission
- 29 The doom of angels who usurp divine honors
- 30-33 God’s works the proof of His divinity
- 34-35 No human is immortal, all souls will taste death and be returned to God
- 36-37 Muhammad regarded by the Makkans as a scoffer
- 38-39 Men hasty to call down divine wrath on themselves
- 40 Threatened vengeance will descend suddenly
- 41-42 The doom of those who mocked former prophets
- 43-44 The gods of the idolaters unable to deliver their votaries, God will triumph over the infidels
- 45-46 Muhammad only a warner, the deaf will not hear the warnings of God
- 47 God will judge righteously
- 48-50 Moses and Aaron, like Muhammad, received a revelation
- The story of Abraham
  - 51 He receives a revelation
  - 52-56 Reproaches his father and people with idolatry
  - 57 He devises a plot to destroy the idols
  - 58 He destroys the idols of the Chaldeans
  - 59-61 He is accused before the people
  - 62-63 He lays the blame on the largest idol
  - 64-65 The Chaldeans at first disposed to repent, but they draw back
  - 66-67 Abraham reproaches them for their idolatry
  - 68 They command him to be burned alive
  - 69-70 God miraculously delivers him
  - 71-73 He receives the promise of Isaac and Jacob
- 74-75 Lot delivered from Sodom
- 76 Noah delivered from the Flood
- 77 The rejecters of Noah drowned for being evil
- 78-80 The wisdom of David and Solomon, the hills and birds sang with David
- 81-82 Winds and demons subject to Solomon
- 83-84 Job is delivered from his affliction
- 85-86 Other prophets receive mercy from God
- 87-88 Jonah repents to God and is saved from affliction
- 89-90 Zachariah’s prayer answered
- 91 The miraculous conception of Jesus through the virgin Mary
- 92-93 The true religion is one, but Jews and Christians have sects
- 94 The faithful certain to be rewarded
- 95-97 Infidels to be judged at the resurrection
- 98-100 Idolaters with their gods to be cast into hell
- 101-103 The reward of the righteous
- 104 The heavens to be rolled away at the judgment
- 105-106 The righteous shall inherit the earth
- 107-109 Muhammad is a mercy to mankind and an informer
- 110-111 God knows the secret thoughts of the infidels
- 112 God will judge the infidels and show mercy to His prophet

== Historical context ==
Muslims believe this surah was revealed in the Second Meccan Period and is listed as Number 65 according to the Nöldeke Chronology. Within its verses are found numerous evocations of earlier Judeo-Christian prophets. These examples help to emphasize and define Muhammad's role as a messenger within the Quranic context. Additionally, the incorporation of pre-existing Biblical and Judaic scriptures integrate Muhammad's prophetic mission into a larger religious framework, thus broadening the horizons of both the Quran as a text and Islam as a religious movement. The surah is thematically and stylistically characteristic of the Second Meccan Period. The verses identify the religious agency of Muhammad by relating him to preexisting Judeo-Christian figures, and from there illustrate common notional doctrines, such as: Islamic eschatology embodied in the Day of Judgment, the fates of the disbelievers and the believers, and the mercy of God. In terms of ordering and delivery, surah 21 contains a tripartite composition and traceable "ring structure", in which the path of revelation comes full circle through the sequence of three distinct parts. Consisting of 112 verses in total, The Prophets maintains the Quran's distinctive voice, in which the verses seem conscious of their own revelation and also depend on other Surahs to illustrate particular messages. This clear self-reference, or "self-declaration", and intertextuality are perceptibly unique to the Quran and possess the book with a consciousness distinct from other religious texts.
