= Rijan =

Rijan (Persian: ريجان or ريجن) may refer to:

- Rijan, Fars, a village in Beyza Rural District, Beyza District, Sepidan County, Fars Province, Iran
- Rijan, Markazi, a village in Jushaq Rural District, in the Central District of Delijan County, Markazi Province, Iran
- Node (singer) (Rijan Nabaz), Danish singer known as Rijan

== See also ==
- Rian, a surname and given name
- Rihan (disambiguation)
