= Yaqut al-Musta'simi =

Calligrapher, Secretary of Al-Musta'sim

Yaqut al-Musta'simi ياقوت المستعصمي
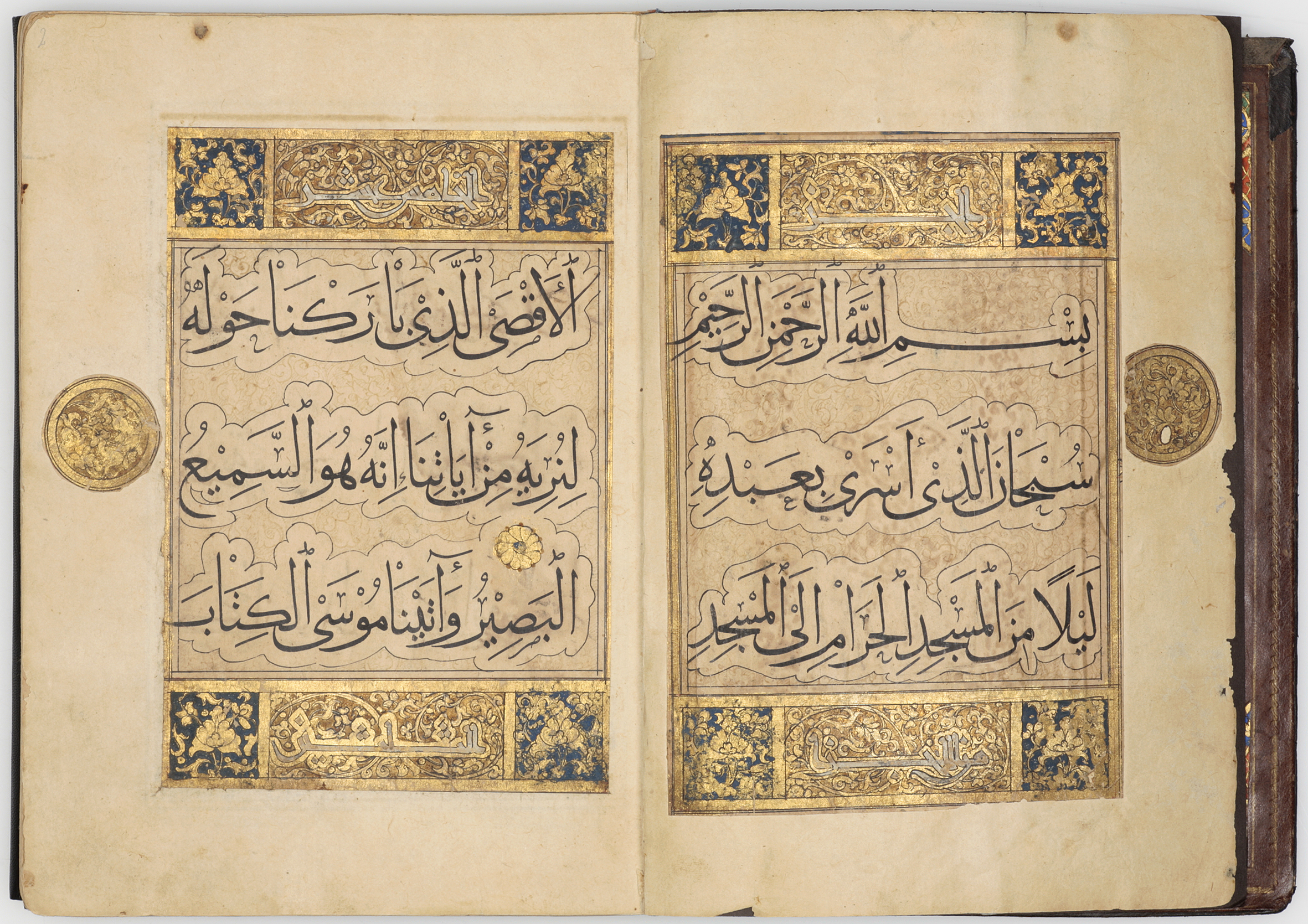
- Double page from the Qur’an copied by Ya'qut al-Musta'simi in Baghdad, 1282–1283 AD (681 AH). Main text in Muhaqqaq script, incidentals in Kufic.
- Born: Amaseia (modern-day Amasya, Turkey)
- Died: 1298
- Known for: Islamic calligraphy
- Patrons: Al-Musta'sim

Yaqut al-Musta'simi (Arabic: ياقوت المستعصمي) (died 1298) was a well-known calligrapher and secretary of the last Abbasid caliph.

== Life and work ==
He was probably of Greek origin in Amaseia and carried off when he was very young into slavery. Made into a eunuch, he was converted to Islam as Abu’l-Majd Jamal al-Din Yaqut, better known as Yaqut al-Musta‘simi because he served Caliph al-Musta‘sim, the last Abbasid caliph.

He was a slave in the court of al-Musta'sim and went on to become a calligrapher in the Royal Court. He spent most of his life in Baghdad. He studied with the female scholar and calligrapher, Shuhda Bint Al-‘Ibari, who was herself a student in the direct line of Ibn al-Bawwab. During the Mongol invasion of Baghdad (1258), he took refuge in the minaret of a mosque so he could finish his calligraphy practice, while the city was being ransacked. His career, however, flourished under Mongol patronage. Yaqut inspired an elegant depiction of the Mongol ruler Abaqa's name on the Mongol coinage and continued to serve under the Ilkhan Rinchindorj Gaykhatu in the Ilkhanate.

He refined and codified six basic calligraphic styles of the Arabic script. Naskh script was said to have been revealed and taught to the scribe in a vision. He improved on Ibn Muqla's style by replacing the straight cut reed pen with an oblique cut, which resulted in a more elegant script. He developed Yakuti, a handwriting named after him, described as a thuluth of "a particularly elegant and beautiful type."

He taught many students, both Arab and non-Arab. His most celebrated students are Ahmad al-Suhrawardi and Yahya al-Sufi.

He became a much-celebrated calligrapher across the Arab-speaking world. His school became the model followed by Persian and Ottoman calligraphers for centuries. In the second half of the 13th century, he gained the honorific, quiblat al-kuttab [cynosure of the calligraphers].

His output was prolific. Although, he is said to have copied the Qur'an more than a thousand times, problems with attributing his work, may have contributed to exaggerated estimates. Other sources suggest that he produced 364 copies of the Q'ran.

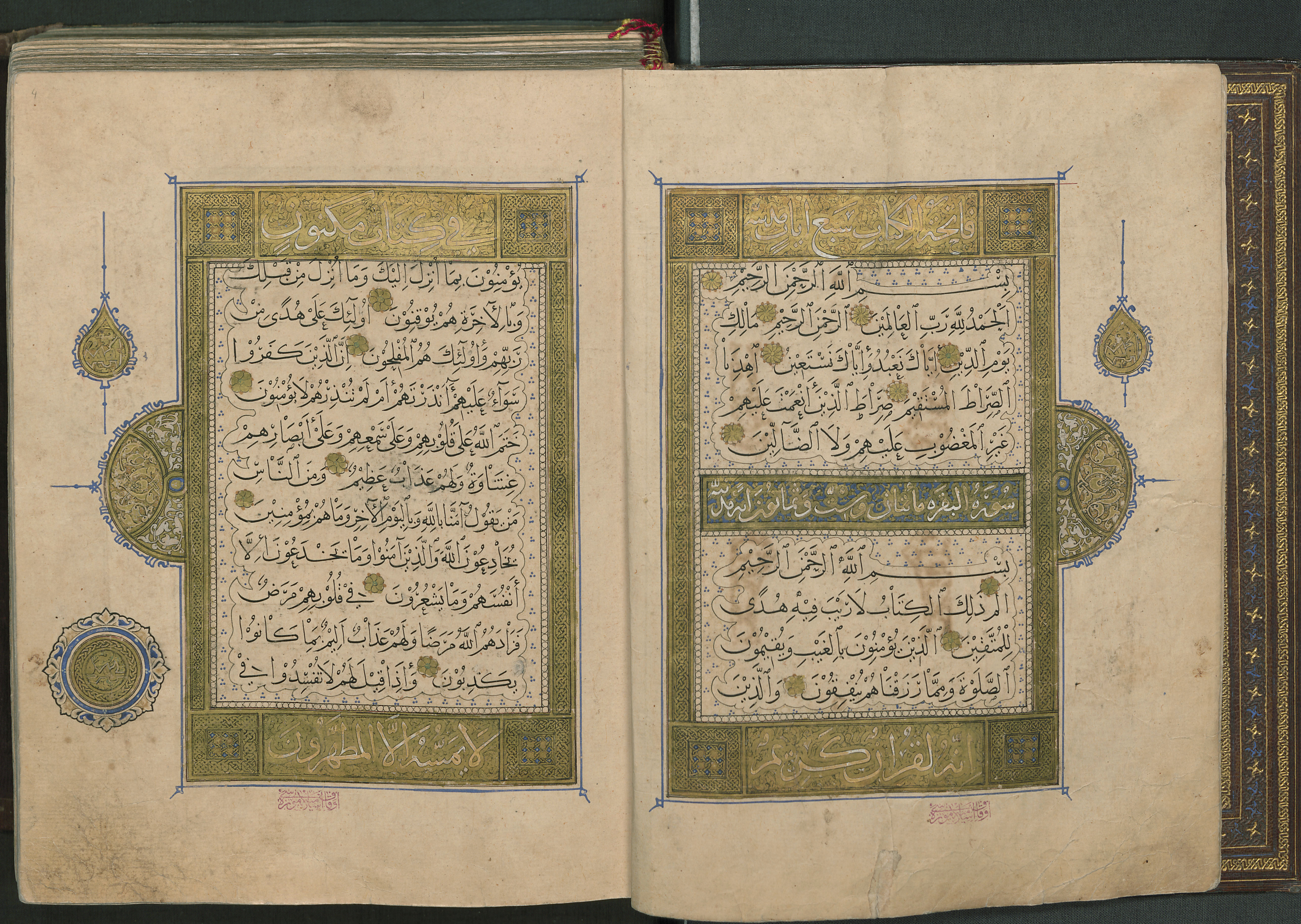
Double page of Quran, dated to 1286–1287. Rayhani script. Turkish and Islamic Arts Museum

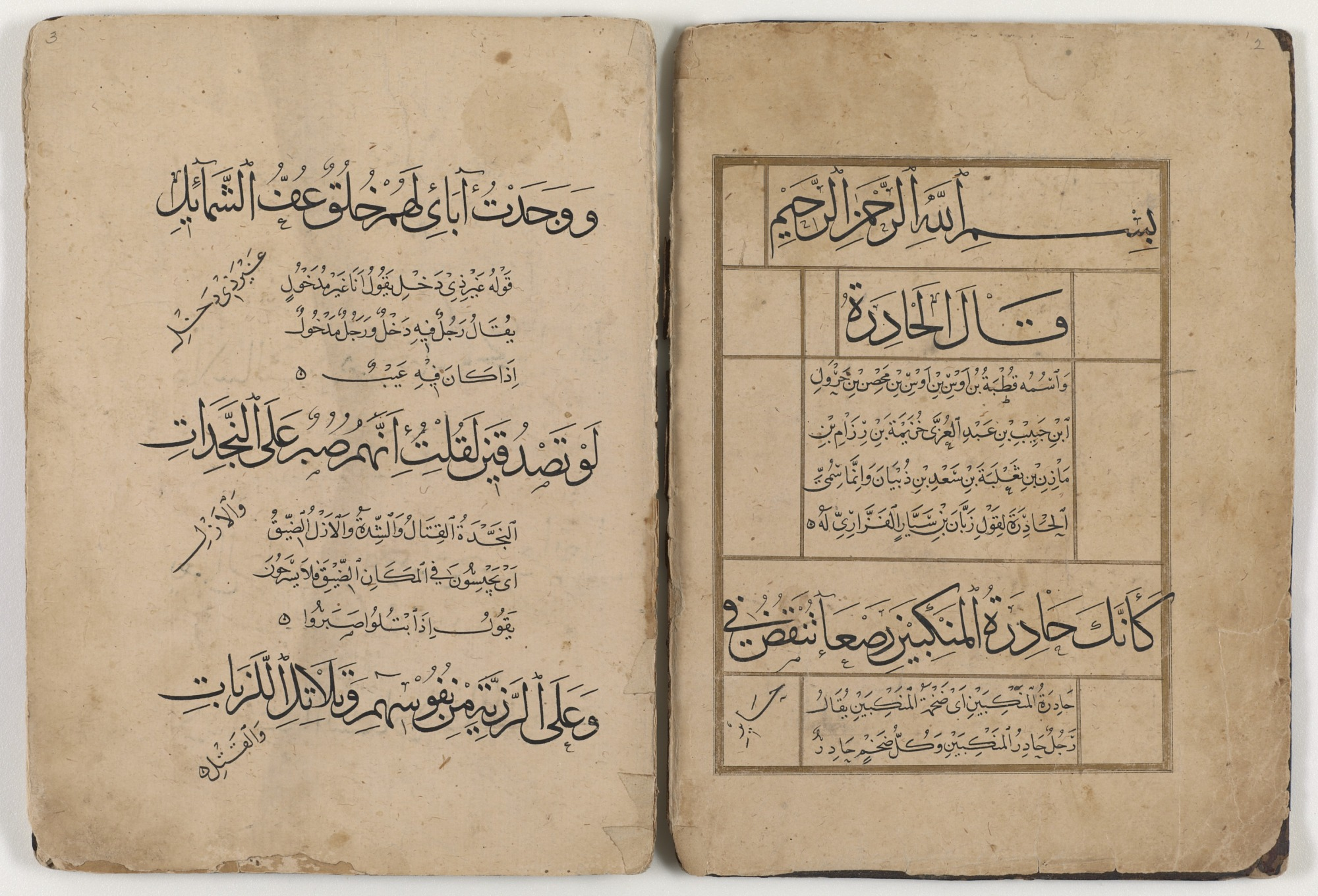
Two pages from the manuscript of "Divan shu’r al-Hadira" (The collected verses of Al-Hadira). Naskh and thuluth script. Freer Gallery of Art

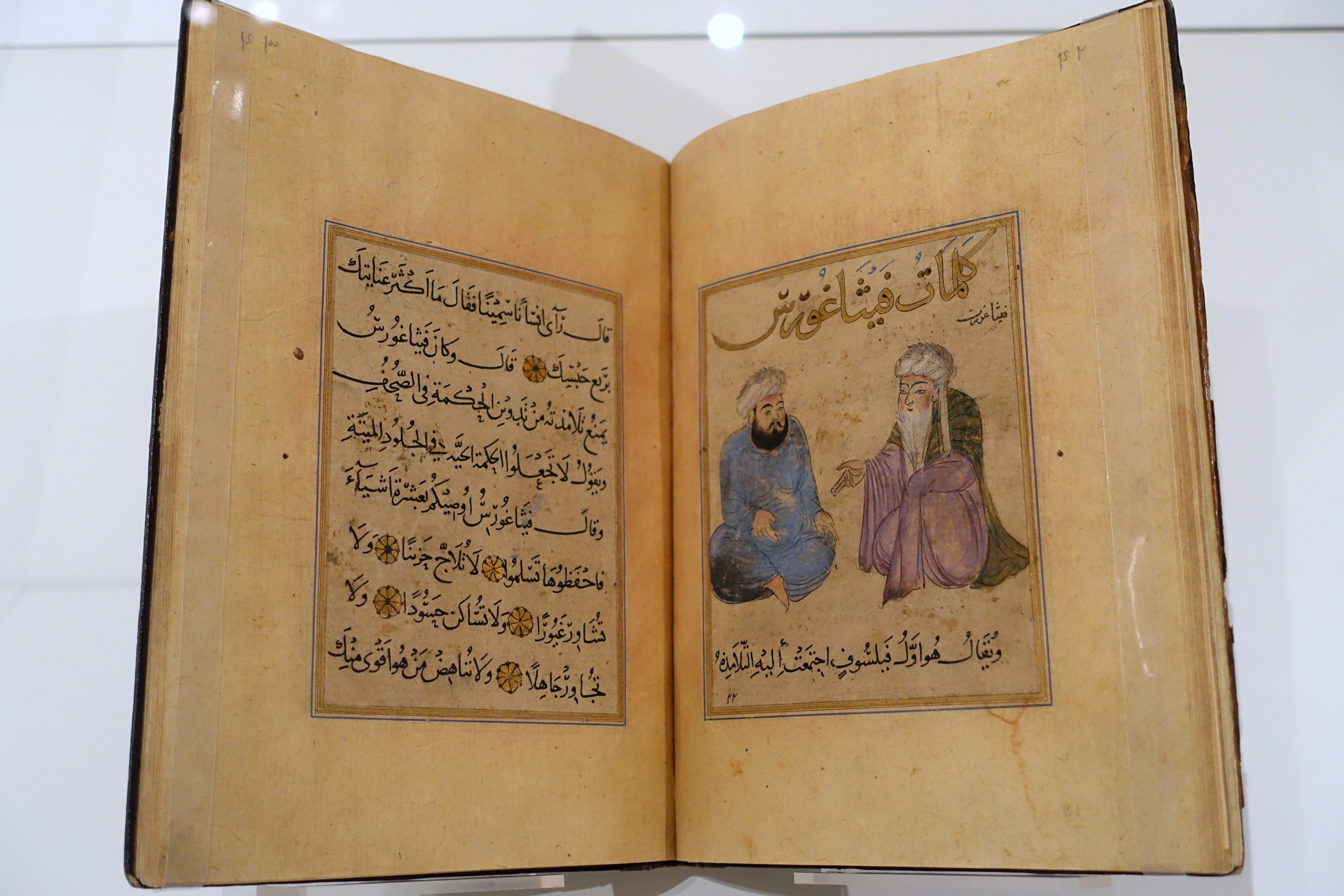
Two pages from the manuscript of the 'Spiritual Words from Greek Philosophy with Sayings of the Philosophers Accompanied with their Portraits' (Al-Kalimat al-Ruhaniyya min al-Hikam al-Yunaniyya fi Kalimat al-Hukama’ wa Ashkalihim). Naskh script. Painting by Mahmud b. Abi'l-Mahasin Al-Qashi. Aga Khan Museum

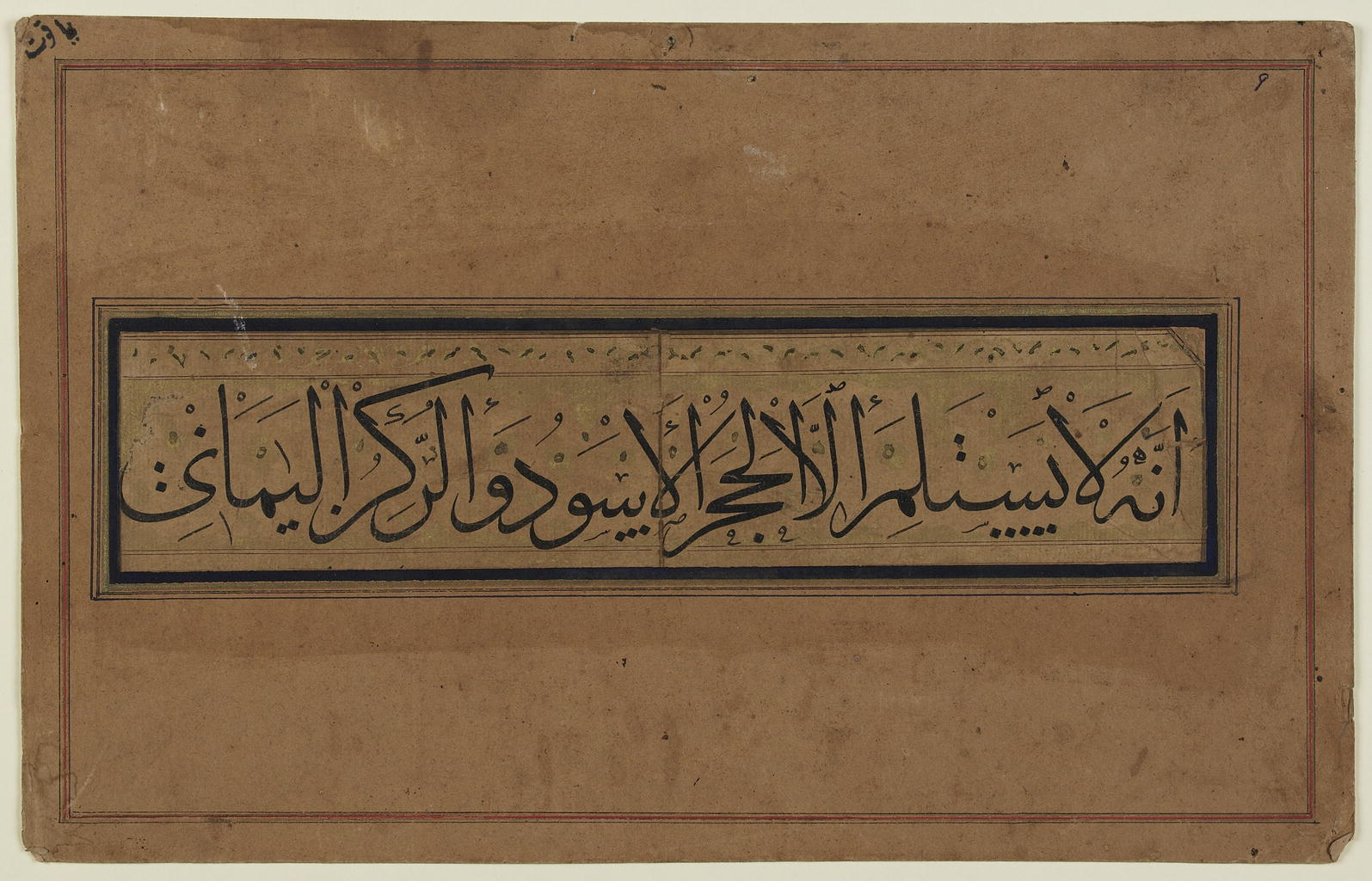
Line in thuluth. Part of the pilgrimage guide. Library of Congress

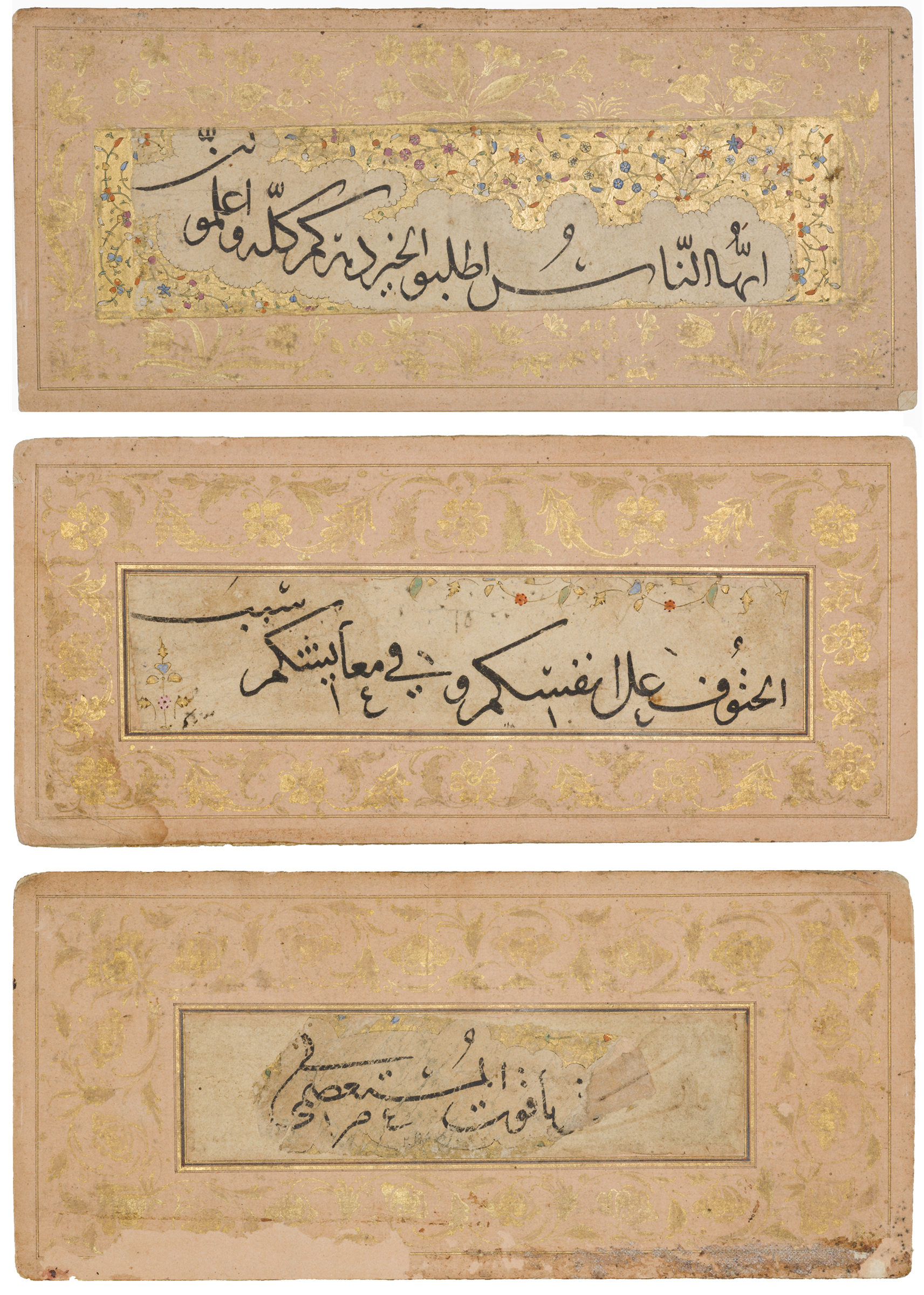
Calligraphic album (Muraqqa) with arabic aphorisms in tawqi script. They were probably originally part of a manuscript and were later cut and arranged in their present form in Iran sometime in the 17th century, when the illumination was added. Khalili Collection of Islamic Art

== See also ==
- Tekuder, son of Hulagu and a Muslim convert
