= Rehana =

Rehana may refer to:

- Rehana (actress), Indian and Pakistani film actress
- Sheikh Rehana, Bangladeshi politician
- Rehana, Haripur, a village and union council in Pakistan
- Reyhaneh or Rehāna, a village in Abdoliyeh-ye Gharbi Rural District, Iran
- Rehana Khatoon, an Indian scholar

== See also ==
- Rihanna (disambiguation)
- Rehan (disambiguation)
- Reyhan (disambiguation)
