= Reyhan (name) =

Reyhan is a unisex given name and a surname. Notable people with the name are as follows:

== Given name ==
=== Female ===
- Reyhan Angelova (1986–2005), Bulgarian Romani singer
- Reyhan Jamalova, Azerbaijani businesswoman
- Reyhan Karaca (born 1970), Turkish singer
- Reyhan Şahin (born 1981), German radio host of Turkish descent
- Reyhan Şeker (born 1984), Turkish football player
- Reyhan Taşdelen (born 2007), Turkish Paralympian athlete
- Reyhan Topchubashova (1905–1970), Azerbaijani painter
- Reyhan Yılmaz (born 2001), Turkish goalball player
- Reyhan Yüksekoğlu (born 1980), Turkish football player

=== Male ===
- Reyhan Arabacıoğlu (born 1980), Turkish weightlifter
- Reyhan Özgür (born 1978), Turkish diplomat

=== Middle name ===
- Abū Rayḥān al-Bīrūnī (973–1048), Muslim scholar and polymath

== Surname ==
- Ada Rehan, American actress
