= Rhiannon (disambiguation) =

Rhiannon is a queen in Welsh mythology.

Rhiannon may also refer to:

- Rhiannon (given name), a Welsh given name
- Lee Rhiannon (born 1951), Australian politician
- "Rhiannon" (song), a 1975 Fleetwood Mac song
- Rhiannon: Curse of the Four Branches, a 2008 video adventure game
- 16912 Rhiannon, an asteroid

== See also ==
- Rhianna, variant feminine given name
