= Rehan =

Rehan may refer to:

== Places ==
- Rehan, India, a town in Himachal Pradesh
- Channi Taja Rehan, a village in Pakistan which is home to the Rehan clan
- Um ar-Rehan, a Palestinian village

== People ==
- Ada Rehan (c. 1857–1916), an Irish-born American actress
- Diwan Rehan Khan, an Indian cricketer
- Rehan Butt, a former Pakistani field hockey player
- Rehan Naufal Kusharjanto, an Indonesian badminton player
- Rehan Sheikh, a Pakistani actor and director
- Rehan Ahmed, an English cricketer
- Rehan Nazar Jung, fictional ISI agent and father of Zoya Nazar in the Indian YRF Spy Universe, portrayed by Aamir Bashir

== See also ==
- Reyhan (disambiguation)
- Rehana (disambiguation)
