= Rhiannon (given name) =

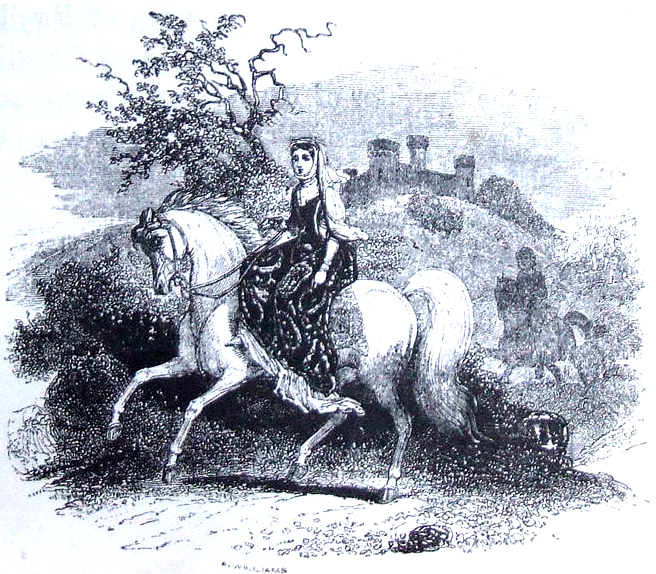
The Goddess Rhiannon is an important figure from Welsh mythology

Rhiannon is a feminine Welsh given name (pronounced [r̥iˈanɔn]) possibly derived from the Old Celtic title Rigantona, meaning great queen. While the goddess Rhiannon is a major figure in Welsh mythology, and a main protagonist in the Mabinogi, Rhiannon was not a popular given name in Wales until the 20th century. It rose in use throughout the Anglosphere after 1975, following the release of the hit song "Rhiannon" by Fleetwood Mac.

It may refer to:

- Rhiannon Braund, 21st century New Zealand academic and pharmacist
- Rhiannon Dixon (born 1995), British boxer, former WBO world champion
- Rhiannon Fish (born 1991), Canadian-born Australian actress
- Rhiannon Giddens (born 1977), American singer and musician
- Rhiannon Ifans (born 1954), Welsh academic and author
- Rhiannon Rhi Jeffrey (born 1986), American swimmer
- Rhiannon Davies Jones (1921–2014), Welsh historical novelist
- Rhiannon Lassiter (born 1977), British writer
- Rhiannon Roberts (born 1990), Welsh footballer

== See also ==
- Rhianna, variant feminine given name
- Rhiannon (disambiguation)
- Rhian
