= Rayhani script =

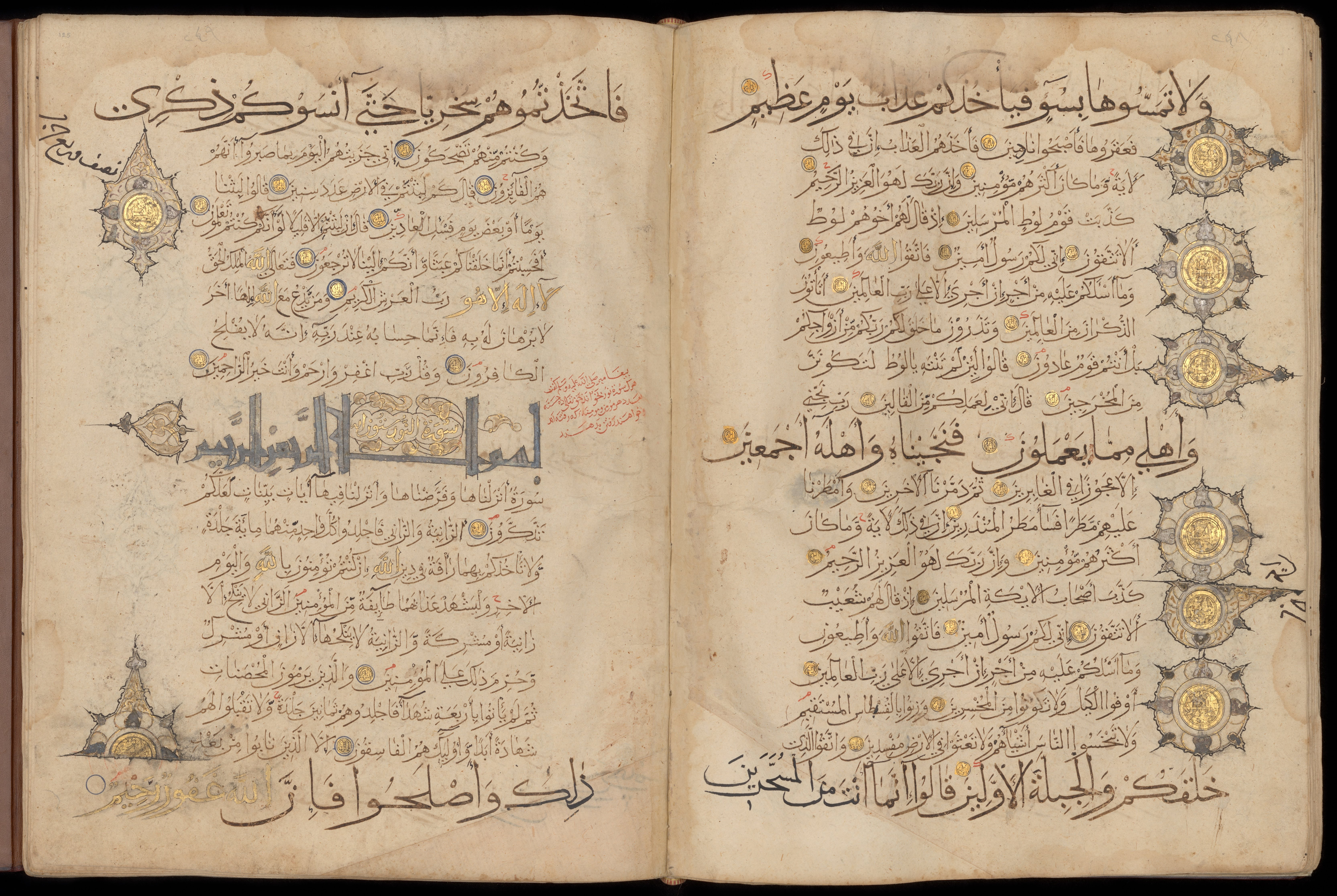
Double-page from the Qur'an copied by 'Abd al-Rahman b. Abi Bakr b 'Abd al-Rahman al-Katib al-Maliki, called Zarin Qalam (Golden Pen). Each page of this manuscript has nineteen lines of text; the first, tenth, and nineteenth lines are written in muhaqqaq, and the two blocks sandwiched in between each comprise eight lines in rayhani. Iran, 1186. Chester Beatty Library

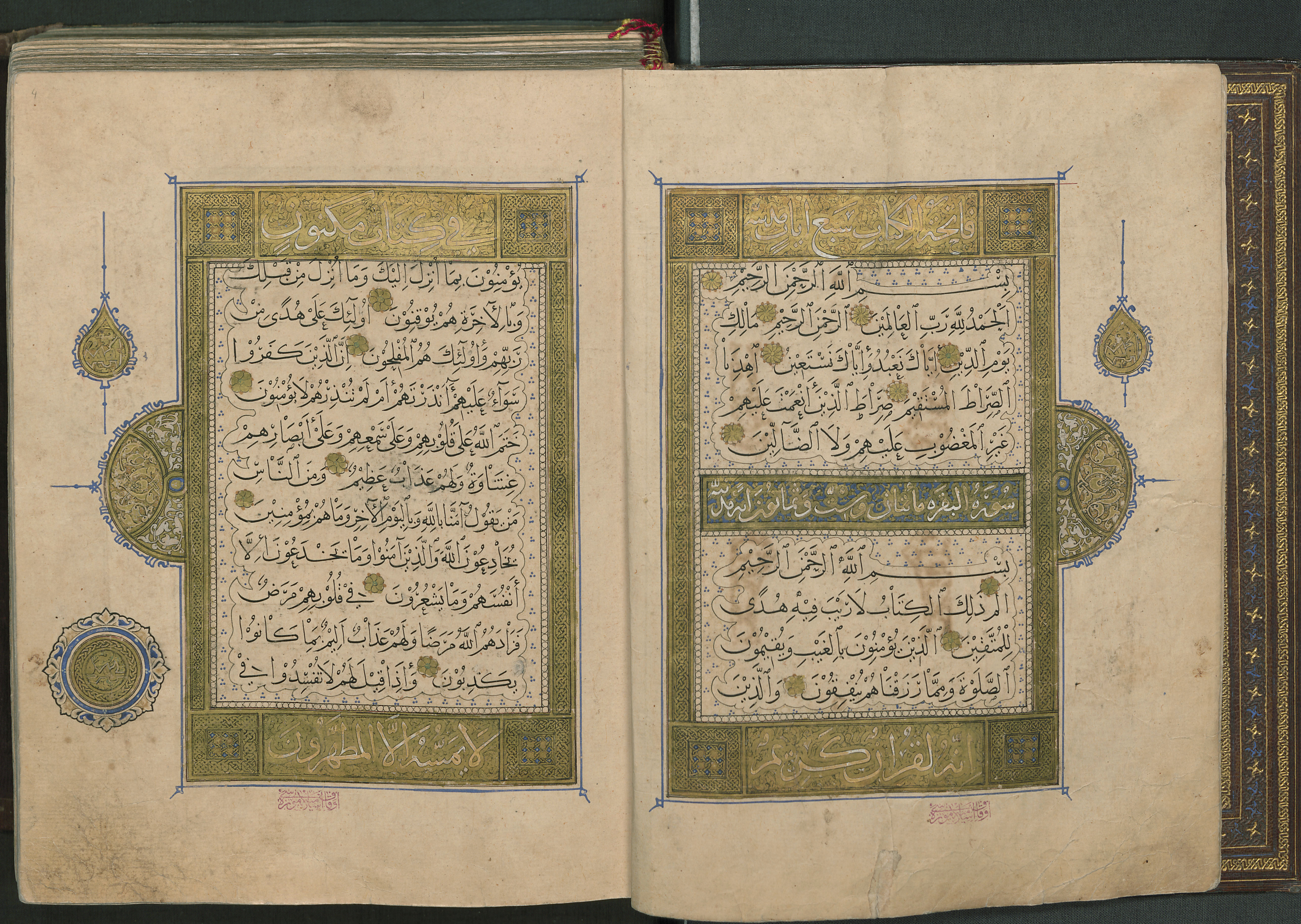
Opening pages from a Qur'an copied in rayhani by Yaqut al-Musta’simi. Baghdad, 1286/1287. Turkish and Islamic Arts Museum

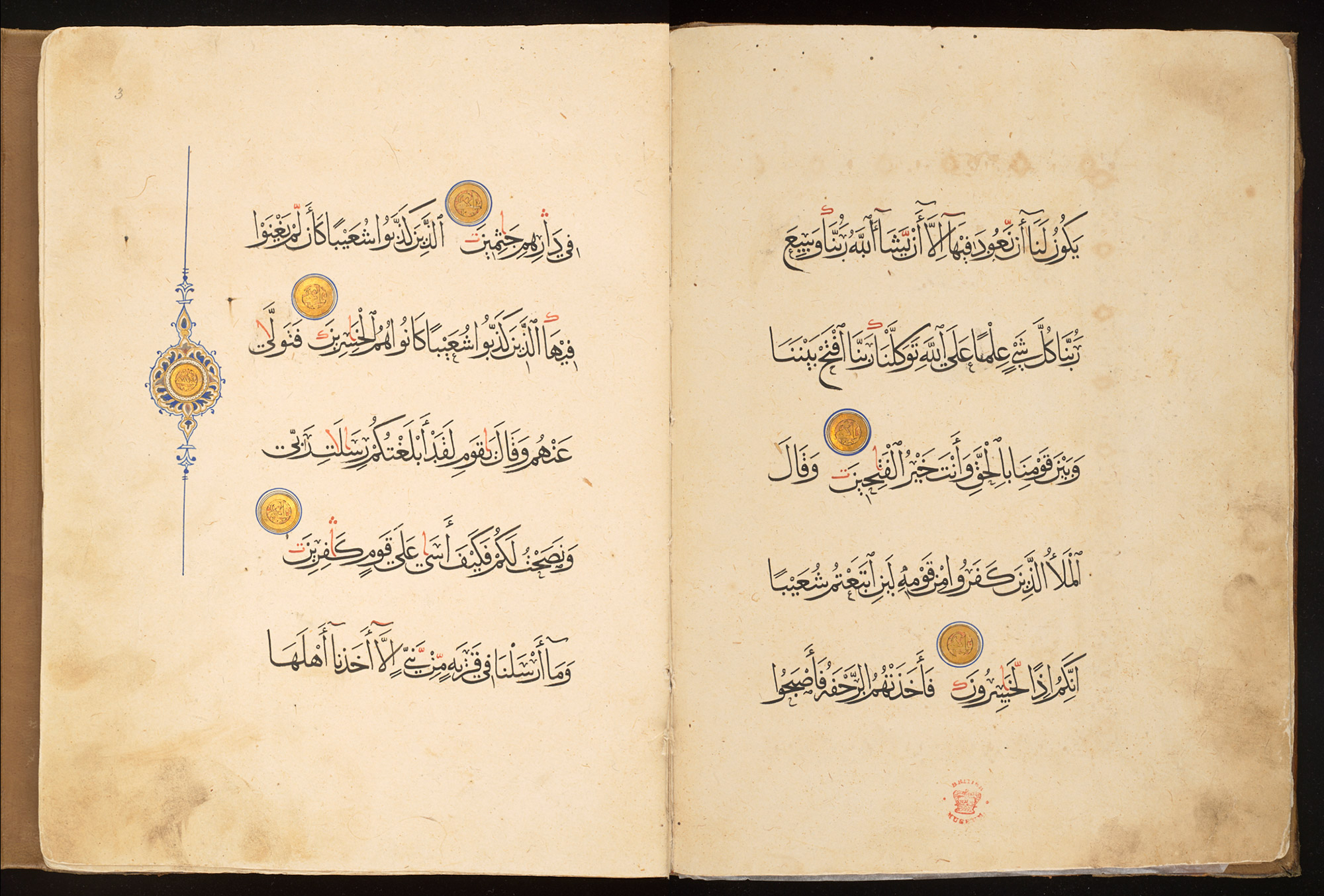
Double-page from a Mamluk Qur'an copied in rayhani by Ali ibn Muhammad al-Mukattib al-Ashrafi (attribution). Cairo, c. 1370–1375. British Library

Reyhan or Rayḥānī (Arabic: ریحان) is one of the six canonical scripts of Perso-Arabic calligraphy. The word Reyhan means basil in Arabic and Persian. Reyhan is considered a finer variant of Muhaqqaq script, likened to flowers and leaves of basil.

Rayḥānī was developed during the Abbasid era by Ibn al-Bawwab. Academic studies of Rayhani have included an analytical study of the technical characteristics of Yaqut al-Musta’simi's method.
