= Anwen Keeling =

Australian artist (born 1976)

Anwen Keeling (born in 1976) is an Australian portrait painter. Working primarily with oil paints, her artworks have often focused on introspective women in private settings. She has „always been influenced by Caravaggio.“ Her artworks prominently contain areas of deep shadows.

== Training ==
Keeling was born in Sydney and received a Bachelor of Arts (Visual) with Honours (First Class) and University Medal, from the Canberra School of Art at the Australian National University. She received a Master of Arts (European Fine Art) from the Winchester School of Art at Southampton University in Barcelona, Spain.

== Exhibitions ==
Her artworks have been exhibited in Spain, Japan, Australia, and England.

Solo Exhibitions

- 2014 The Blue Room, Liverpool Street Gallery, Sydney
- 2012 Anwen Keeling, Michael Reid Murrurundi, New South Wales 2011 Sporthorse, Liverpool Street Gallery, Sydney
- 2009 Shadow of a Doubt, Liverpool Street Gallery, Sydney
- 2007 Shadowlands, Art Galleries Schubert, Queensland
- 2007 The Falling Dark, Liverpool Street Gallery, Sydney 2005 Languor, Art Galleries Schubert, Queensland 2004 Waiting Room, Brian Moore Gallery, Sydney
- 2003 New Paintings, Brian Moore Gallery, Sydney
- 2001 Allegory, Panorama Gallery, Barcelona, Spain 1999 Swathed, Span Galleries, Melbourne
