= Reyhan Jamalova =

Azerbaijani sustainable energy entrepreneur

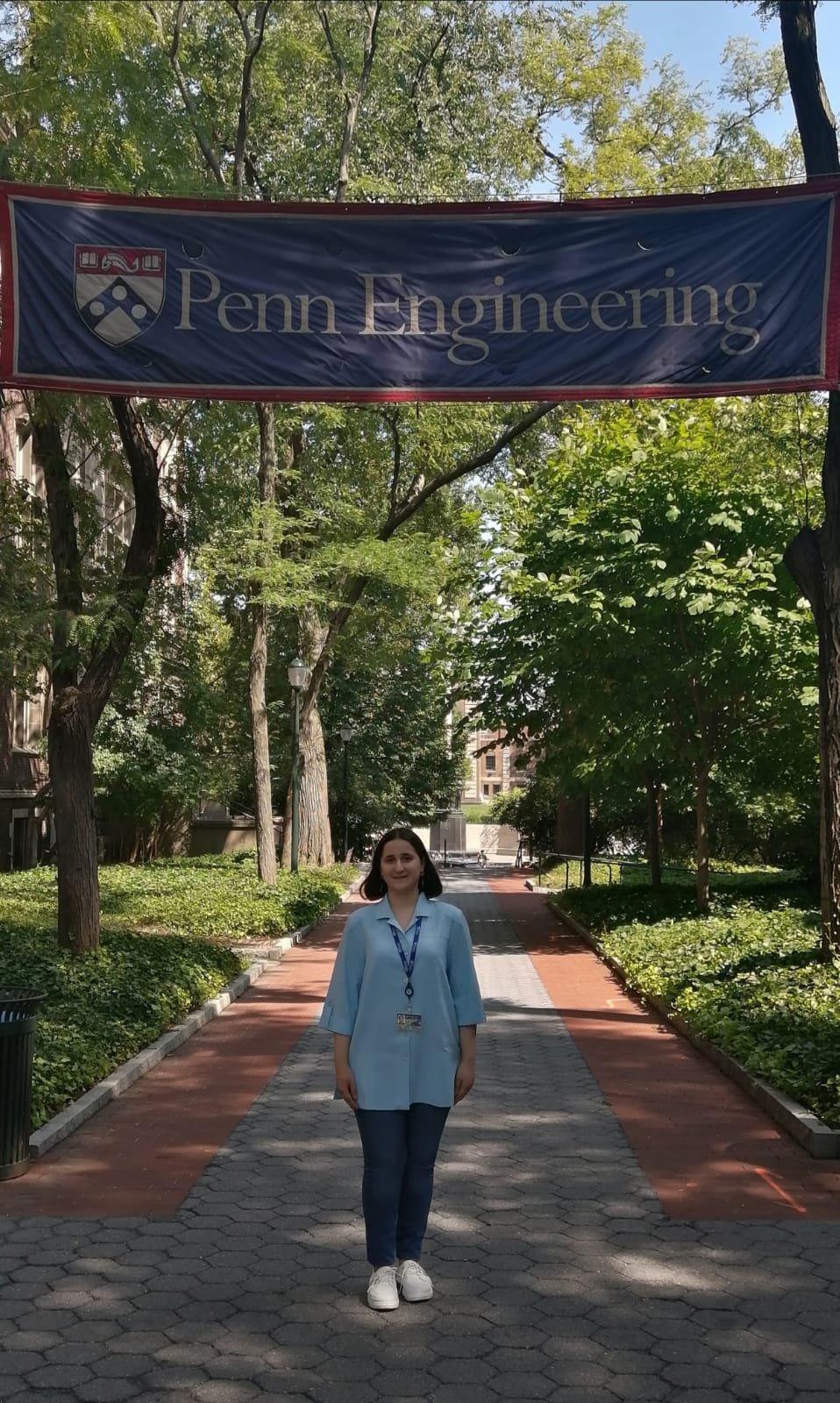
Reyhan Jamalova at the University of Pennsylvania.

Reyhan Jamalova is an Azerbaijani woman in STEM whose work is geared toward sustainable energy in rural areas. She is the founder and CEO of Rainergy, a company that focuses on harnessing the power of rainwater to sustainably generate electricity. Currently, she is an undergraduate student at the University of Pennsylvania. Additionally, she has received a number of honorable mentions, awards, and/or honors for the work that she has done, including praise from the Azerbaijani government.

== Early life ==
=== Childhood ===
Jamalova became interested in human rights as a child. She, along with her best friend started a fundraising campaign for children in Somalia who had limited access to education, food, and water. After collecting $10 by selling things like crayons and pencils, Jamalova and her friend (with the help of Jamalova's parents) brought this money to a charity.

As a child, Jamalova and her family experienced torrential rains in the Caucasus Mountains. These rains would lead to devastating events for the community such as the loss of crops, flooding, and general building damage along with potholes and bridge collapse. Growing up in this environment influenced Jamalova's interest in sustainability in order to help her community and others alike.

=== Education ===
Having been born in a small village, Jamalova did not have access to education in STEM and was expected to marry by the age of 17. However, at the age of 12, Jamalova won the highest score on an entrance exam for a renowned school in Baku and moved away from her family to continue her education. At age 15, Jamalova founded Rainergy.

Jamalova received an admissions offer to the University of Pennsylvania along with a scholarship. She is currently in her freshman year at the University of Pennsylvania, interested in majoring in computer and information science. After she earns her bachelor's degree, she plans to get a master's degree in Data Science while working on Rainergy.

== Rainergy ==
Jamalova, with the help of her friend and physics tutors, worked for 4 months doing calculations and developing a generator to harvest energy from rainwater. Rainergy was first introduced during a ClimateLaunchpad competition, where it was voted as the favored project among audience members. The building phase of the project was initially funded by the government of Azerbaijan, but has since attracted other investors, including The Global Good Fund and Islamic Development Bank.

The device is 9-meters-tall and consists of four integral parts: "a rainwater collector, a water tank, an electric generator and a battery." The role of the rainwater collector is to fill the reservoir with rainwater, which will quickly flow through the generator and produce energy. This energy is then stored via a battery, which allows it to be used for energy even when there is a lack of rainfall. This device reduces reliance on other sources of energy, such as local power grids. Additionally, it is inexpensive.

Jamalova and her team's initial prototype could light 22 LED lamps with 22W of power. Compared to other alternative energy systems, such as solar panels, wind turbines, and piezoelectricity, Rainergy emits lower CO_{2} emissions with 10g per KW/H emitted during electricity production.

== Awards & honors ==
- 2018, Presidential Youth Award
- 2018, Forbes 30 Under 30
- 2018, BBC 100 Women Honoree
- 2019, TRT World Citizen Youth Award
- 2020, Global Good Fund Fellow
- 2020, bp NetZero Scholar
