= Reyhan, East Azerbaijan =

Reyhan ريحان
- Village
- Location within Iran
- Coordinates: 38°25′44″N 47°10′46″E
- Country: Iran
- Province: East Azerbaijan
- County: Ahar
- Bakhsh: Central
- Rural District: Bozkosh

Population (2006)
  - Total: 331
- Time zone: UTC+3:30 (IRST)
  - Summer (DST): UTC+4:30 (IRDT)

Reyhan (Persian: ريحان, also Romanized as Reyḩān; also known as Reyḩāl) is a village in Bozkosh Rural District, in the Central District of Ahar County, East Azerbaijan Province, Iran. At the 2006 census, its population was 331, in 92 families.
