= Riana =

Riana may refer to:

- Rhiannon, the horse goddess in Welsh mythology
- Riana Rouge, action-adventure game
- Riana, Tasmania, a small town in Australia

== People with the given name Riana ==
- Riana Nel (born 1982) is a Namibian singer and songwriter
- Riana Scheepers (born 1957), Afrikaans author
- Marie Antoinette Riana Graharani, better known as The Sacred Riana (born 1992), Indonesian magician and illusionist; Asia's Got Talent (season 2) winner

== See also ==
- Rhiana, given name
- Rhianna, given name
- Rihanna (born 1988), pop music singer from Barbados
- The Sacred Riana (born 13 July 1992), magician/illusionist from Indonesia
