= Channi Taja Rehan =

Pakistani village

Channi Taja Rehan چھنی تاجہ ریحان
- Village
- Location in Punjab, Pakistan Channi Taja Rehan (Pakistan)
- Coordinates: 31°56′50.46″N 73°04′4.94″E
- Country: Pakistan
- Province: Punjab
- District: Sargodha District
- Founder: Taja Rehan

Area
  - Total: 0.078 km^{2} (0.030 sq mi)

Population (2017)
  - Total: 1,774
- Time zone: UTC+5 (PST)
  - Summer (DST): UTC+6 (PDT)

Channi Taja Rehan (Urdu, Punjabi: چھنی تاجہ ریحان), is a village in Sargodha, Punjab, Pakistan. It has been home to the Rehan clan of Punjab which in Mughal times ruled over the area from Chiniot to Kalowal with Kalowal being its local capital.

== List of cities near the village ==
- Kalowal
- Sargodha
- Rabwah
