= Qatrat al-Rihan =

Qatrat al-Rihan قطرة الريحان
- Village
- Location in Syria
- Coordinates: 35°33′39″N 36°15′5″E
- Country: Syria
- Governorate: Hama
- District: Suqaylabiyah
- Subdistrict: Shathah

Population (2004)
  - Total: 659
- Time zone: UTC+3 (AST)
- City Qrya Pcode: C3183

Qatrat al-Rihan (Arabic: قطرة الريحان) is a village in northern Syria located in the Shathah Subdistrict of the al-Suqaylabiyah District in Hama Governorate. According to the Syria Central Bureau of Statistics (CBS), Qatrat al-Rihan had a population of 659 in the 2004 census. Its inhabitants are predominantly Alawites.
