= Rihana, Hama =

Rihana, Hama ريحانة
- Village
- Location in Syria
- Coordinates: 35.588469°N 36.263294°E
- Country: Syria
- Governorate: Hama
- District: Al-Suqaylabiyah District
- Subdistrict: Shathah

Population (2004)
  - Total: 985
- Time zone: UTC+3 (AST)
- City Qrya Pcode: N/A

Rihana, Hama (Arabic: ريحانة) is a Syrian village located in Shathah Subdistrict in Al-Suqaylabiyah District, Hama. According to the Syria Central Bureau of Statistics (CBS), Rihana had a population of 985 in the 2004 census.
