= Rhian =

- Gender: Feminine (and masculine, rare)

Origin
- Origin: derived from Welsh rhiain "maiden" (from Celtic *rīgan- "queen"). British name rhian (pronounced differently than Welsh name "rhiain") derives from "rix" "king"
- Meaning: (1) "maiden"; (2) "king" or rix

Other names
- Nickname: Rhianen (with diminutive suffix)
- Related names: Rhiain, Rhianna, Rhiannon, Rhianu, Rhianwen, Rhianydd, Ryan

Rhian (English: /ˈriːən/ REE-ən) is a feminine given name and a variation of rhiain, a Welsh word for "maiden". Rhian (English: /ˈraɪ.ən/ RY-ən) is sometimes used, albeit rarely, as a male name, possibly a modern spelling variant of Ryan. The first root, Rhian-, derives from British rix "king"; the second, Rhiein-, derives from a word meaning "maiden, virgin".

== Notable people ==
- Saint Rhian, Welsh saint
- Rhian Benson (born 1977), British singer
- Rhian Blundell (born 1997), English actress
- Rhian Brewster (born 2000), English footballer
- Rhian Cleverly (born 1995), Welsh footballer
- Rhian Davies (born 1981), Australian footballer
- Rhian Dodds (born 1979), Canadian soccer player
- Rhian Edmunds (born 2003), Welsh track cyclist
- Rhian Edwards (poet) (fl. from 2008), Welsh poet
- Rhian Gallagher (born 1961), Welsh poet
- Rhian Griffiths (born 1980), Welsh darts player
- Rhian Jones (born 1960), British planetary scientist
- Rhian Ket (born 1983), Dutch speed skater
- Rhian Nokes (born 1989), Welsh former footballer and rugby player
- Rhian O'Sullivan (née Edwards; born 1981), Welsh darts player
- Rhian Pugh (born 1989), British gymnast
- Rhian Ramos (born 1990), Filipino actress
- Rhian Samuel (born 1944), Welsh composer
- Rhian Sheehan (fl. from 2001), New Zealand composer
- Rhian Teasdale (born 1994), British musician
- Rhian Touyz (born 1959), Canadian medical researcher
- Rhian Wilkinson (born 1982), British-Canadian soccer player

== See also ==
- Rhiannon (given name)
