= Rhiana =

Rhiana is a given name. Notable people with the name include:

- Rhiana Griffith (born 1985), Australian actress and artist
- Rhiana Gunn-Wright (born 1988), American political scientist
- Rhiana Yazzie, Navajo playwright and filmmaker

== See also ==
- Rhianna, given name
- Riana § People with the given name Riana
- Rihanna (born 1988), Barbadian singer
