= Ibn al-Bawwab =

Arabic calligrapher and manuscript illuminator (d. 1022)

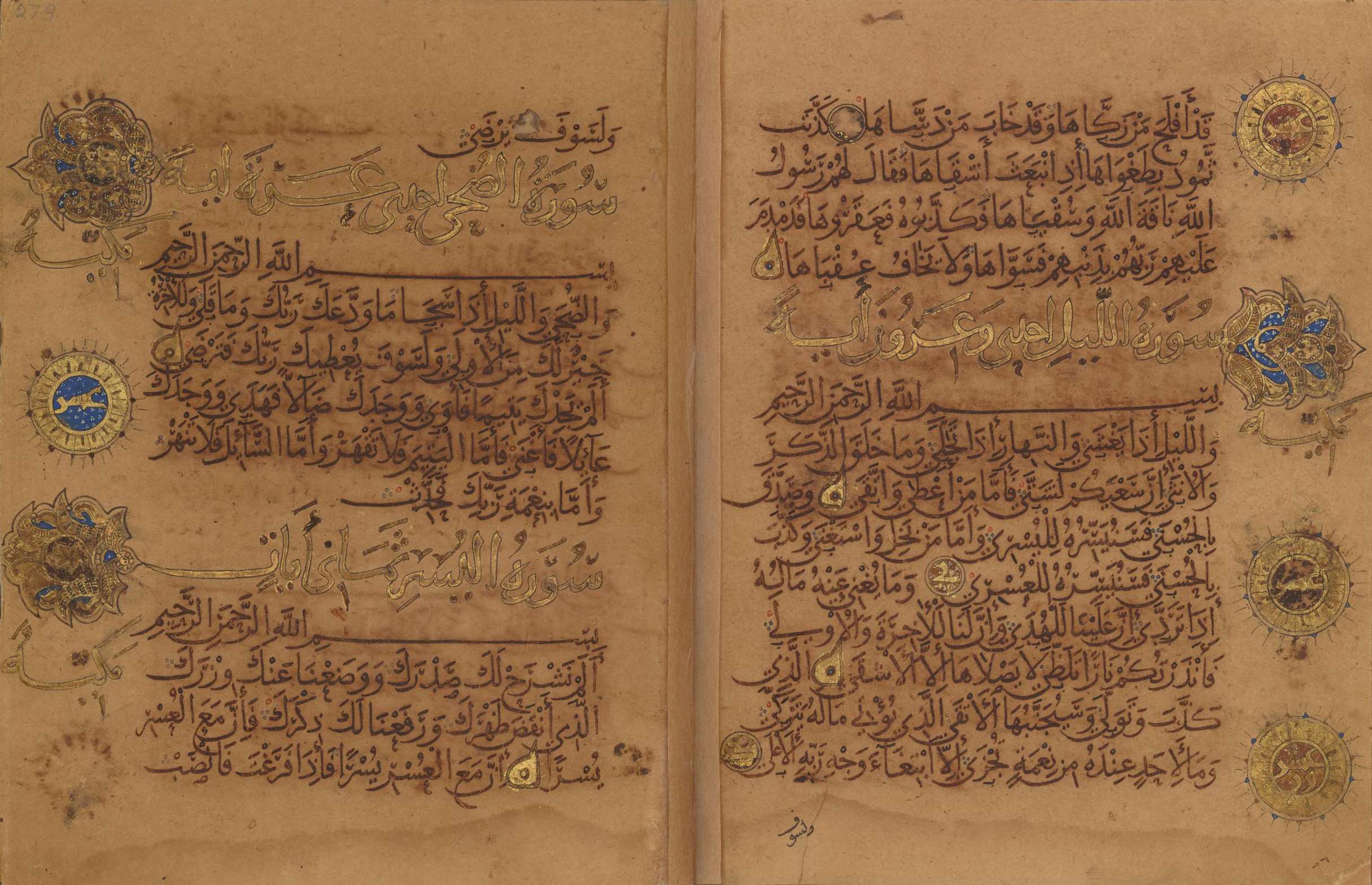
- Ibn al-Bawwab script seen here is the earliest existing example of a Qur'an written in a cursive script, Chester Beatty Library
- Born: 975 or 1000; Iraq
- Died: 1022 or 1031; Baghdad
- Known for: Islamic calligraphy
- Movement: Naskh Thuluth muhaqqaq

Ibn al-Bawwāb (Arabic: إِبْن ٱلْبَوَّاب), also known as Ali ibn-Hilal, Abu'l-Hasan, and Ibn al-Sitri, was an Arabic calligrapher and illuminator who lived in Baghdad. He is the figure most associated with the adoption of round script to transcribe the Qur'an. He most likely died around 1022 CE in Baghdad.

== Life ==
Ibn al-Bawwab was from a poor family. His name literally translates as the “son of the doorkeeper.” He was trained in law and theology, was very devout and is said to have been able to recite the Qur'an from memory. Detailed accounts of his life are lacking, however, it is known that he worked as a home decorator before beginning book illumination and eventually moving to calligraphy. Additionally, it is known that, upon his death in 1022 CE, he was buried in Baghdad near the tomb of Ahmad ibn-Hanbal.

He was fluent in all six scripts and refined them. He achieved fame in his own lifetime and was readily recognized by his long beard. His students carried his improved style through to succeeding generations of calligraphers.

== Works ==
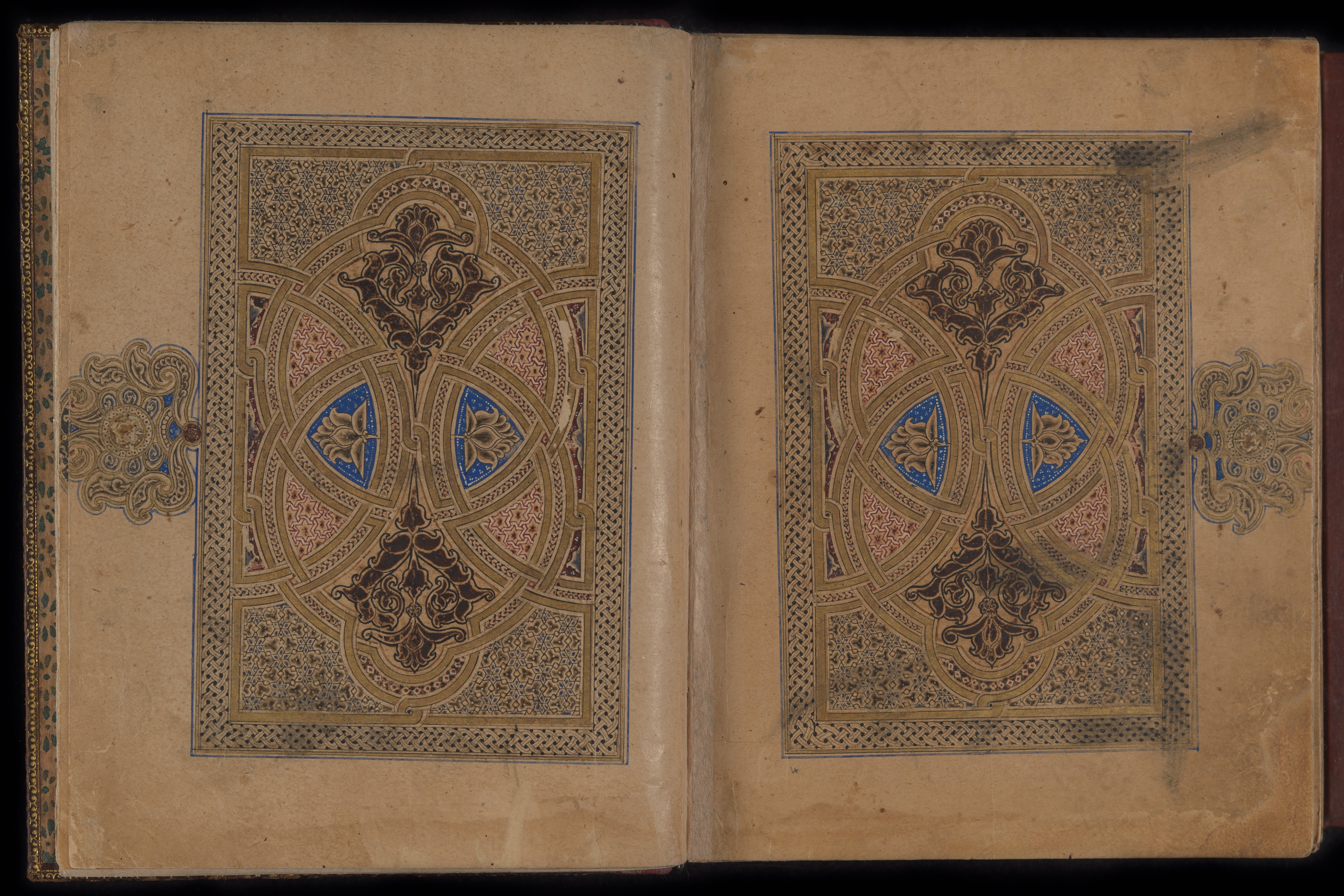
Illuminated Opening from the Ibn al-Bawwab Qur'an

Altogether, Ibn al-Bawwāb reputedly produced 64 copies of the Qur'an. There are six surviving manuscripts with colophons identifying Ibn al-Bawwab as the calligrapher. The only surviving Qur'an bearing his name is the famed copy at the Chester Beatty Library in Dublin, Ireland, a gift of the Ottoman Sultan Selim I (1470–1512). Another surviving manuscript is the luxury codex he produced collecting the works of the pre-Islamic poet Salama ibn-Jandal. Ibn al-Bawwāb was recognized as a master in his own time; his school of calligraphy lasted until Baghdad fell to the Mongols more than two centuries after his death. One of his greatest achievements was the perfection of the al-Khatt al-Mansub (literally, the well-proportioned script) style of Islamic calligraphy. He also contributed to the development of many of the early cursive scripts including rayḥānī, naskh, tawqīʿ and muhaqqaq.

=== Chester Beatty Library Qur'an ===
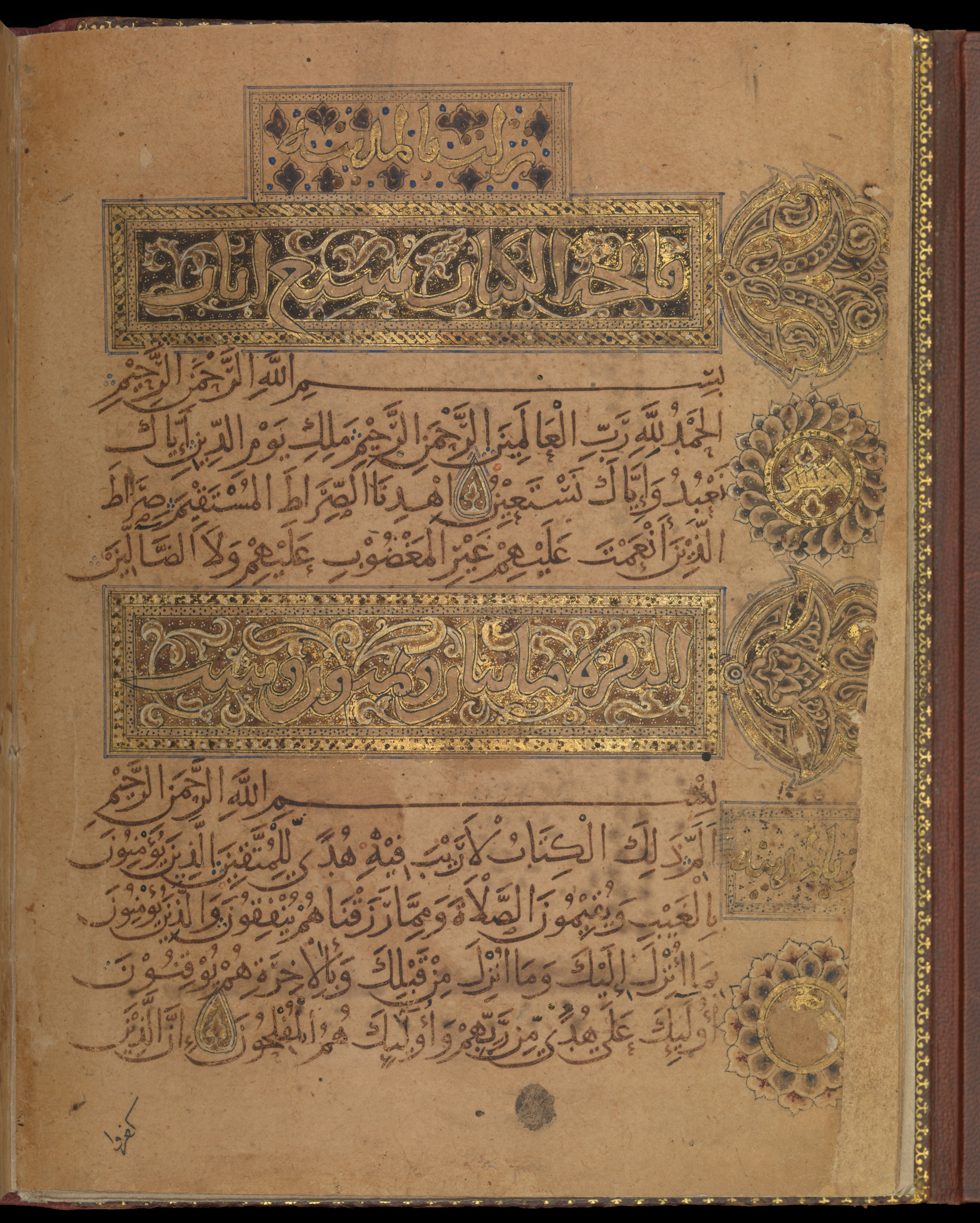
Qur'an of Ibn al-Bawwab, Headings for Al-Fatiha, and for Chapter 2, Al-Baqara

The sole surviving Qur'an penned by Ibn al-Bawwab, housed at the Chester Beatty Library, is the earliest example of a paper-based Qur'an manuscript. Representing a transition from Kufic or semi-Kufic Qur'ans transcribed on parchment or vellum, the Chester Beatty manuscript is written fully in rounded, cursive script on paper. Though the art of paper-making had arrived in Baghdad in the 9th century via the Silk Road, the thinner and more consistent texture of Ibn al-Bawwab's manuscript indicates that the development of finer paper, worthy of transcribing God's word, was a factor in the move from parchment to paper.

The manuscript itself contains 286 folios and originally measured 14x19cm. Additionally, the text is fully vocalized with both vowels and consonants written in the same color ink. It is notable for its fine illumination, using the traditional blue, gold, and sepia on the main pages containing text and further incorporating brown, white, red and green in the opening and closing pages. Given Ibn al-Bawwab's background, it is not surprising to find that the illumination was done by calligrapher himself, indicated in some sections by the use of a reed pen rather than a brush as well as the same ink used for the text.

Apart from the use of paper, the Chester Beatty manuscript is notable for several innovations to Qur'anic calligraphy which heavily influenced the art for centuries. This paper Qur'an, unlike its parchment and vellum predecessors, was oriented vertically rather than horizontally. Breaking from tradition, Ibn al-Bawwab's Qur'an does not use the Kufic script which dominated Islam's first three centuries, instead utilizing more legible cursive scripts. Naskh is used in the main text while the related thuluth script appears in the opening pages as well as the Sura headings and statistical pages containing verse-count. These statistical folios, which began to appear in the semi-Kufic Qur'ans preceding Ibn al-Bawwab, were here expanded to include additional information such as the total word and letter count of each Sura, the word count of the entire manuscript, and even the number of dotted and undotted letters.

Two additional style innovations adopted by Ibn al-Bawwab involve spacing. Whereas previous calligraphers had used symmetrical spacing in the Bismala, Ibn al-Bawwab here relies upon asymmetry, extending one letter to create a large gap between words, drawing the reader's eyes across the page and clearly demarcating a new section. With regard to his spacing of the verses, he left no spaces between individual verses, marking them instead with small, triangular clusters of blue dots. Every fifth and tenth verse, however, does include spacing which is filled with the standard gold markers.

== See also ==
- Islamic art
- Islamic calligraphy
