= Ahmad al-Suhrawardi =

Iranian calligrapher

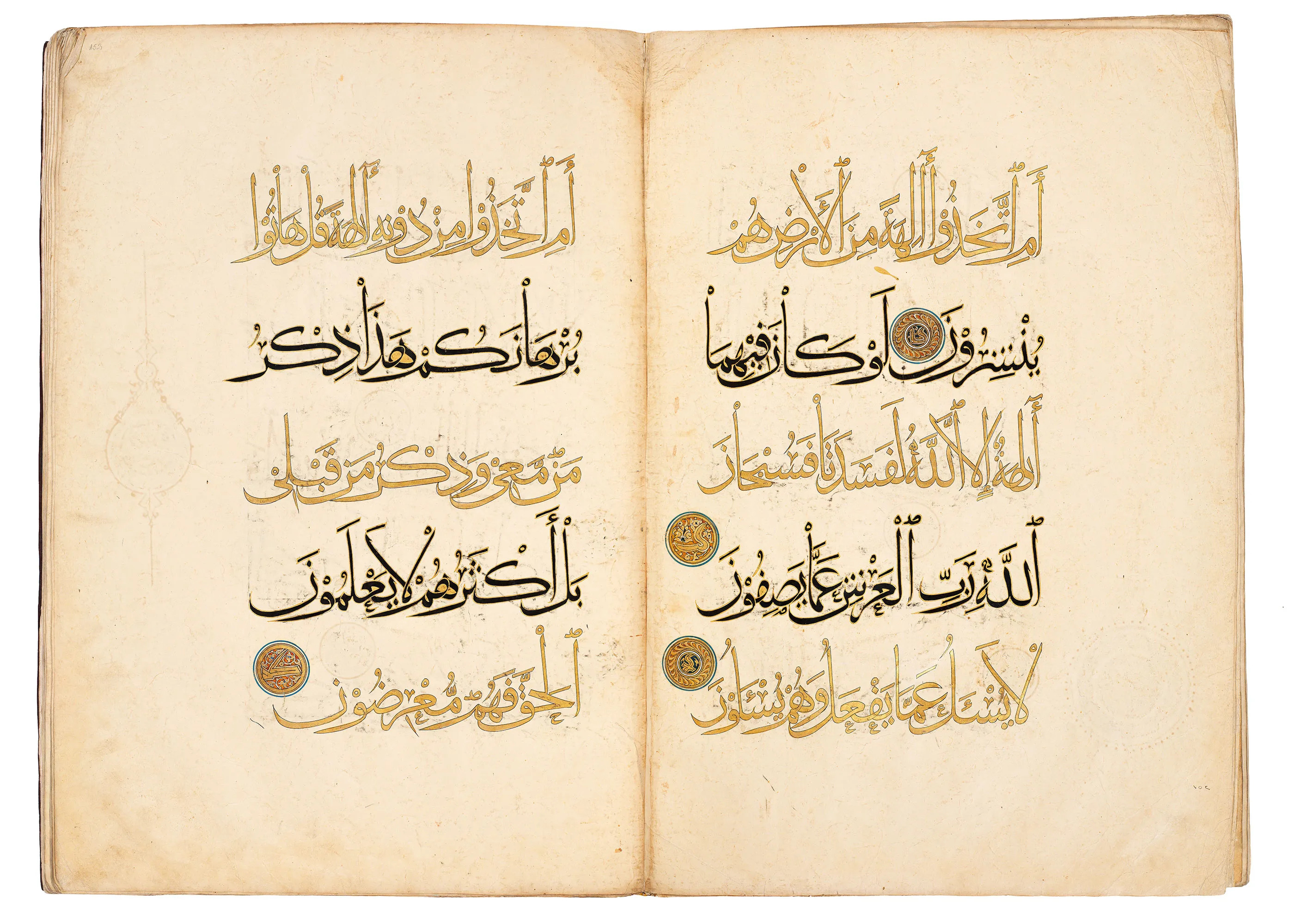
Double-page from the Qur'an manuscript copied by Ahmad al-Suhrawardi and illuminated by Muhammad ibn Aybak ibn 'Abdallah. Muhaqqaq script. Baghdad, 1307/1308. Museum of Turkish and Islamic Arts

Ahmad al-Suhrawardi (1256 – 1340), was a Persian calligrapher and musician from Baghdad, who lived in the Ilkhanate era.

Belonging to a prominent family of mystics, Ahmad was most likely the grandson of the Sufi master Shihab al-Din 'Umar al-Suhrawardi (died 1234). Ahmad was the student of Yaqut al-Musta'simi (died 1298) and is said to have transcribed the Qur'an 33 times. Most famous of his works are two monumental 30-volume Qur'an manuscripts, illuminated by Muhammad ibn Aybak ibn 'Abdallah. Ahmad also designed many architectural inscriptions in Baghdad.

== Sources ==
- Bloom, Jonathan M.; Blair, Sheila S. (2009). "Ahmad al-Suhrawardi". Oxford Reference.
- Semsar, Mohammad Hassan; Zand, Roxane (2008). "Aḥmad al-Suhrawardī". In Madelung, Wilferd; Daftary, Farhad (eds.). Encyclopaedia Islamica Online. Brill Online. ISSN 1875-9831.
