= Rhianna =

Rhianna

- Rhianna (English singer) (born 1983), British singer
- Rhianna Atwood, contestant on America's Next Top Model in 2010
- Rhianna Patrick (born 1977), Australian radio presenter
- Rhianna Pollicina (born 1997), Australian soccer player
- Rhianna Pratchett (born 1976), English video game scriptwriter

== See also ==
- Rhiana, given name
- Rhiannon (given name)
- Riana § People with the given name Riana
- Rihanna (born 1988), Barbadian singer
