= Rijan, Fars =

Rijan ريجان
- Village
- Location within Iran
- Coordinates: 30°01′57″N 52°23′20″E
- Country: Iran
- Province: Fars
- County: Sepidan
- Bakhsh: Beyza
- Rural District: Beyza

Population (2006)
  - Total: 277
- Time zone: UTC+3:30 (IRST)
  - Summer (DST): UTC+4:30 (IRDT)

Rijan (Persian: ريجان, also Romanized as Rījān; also known as Rekhan and Reyḩān) is a village in Beyza Rural District, Beyza District, Sepidan County, Fars province, Iran. At the 2006 census, its population was 277, in 62 families.
