= Muhaqqaq =

Script variety of Arabic calligraphy

Muhaqqaq is one of the main six types of calligraphic script in Arabic. The Arabic word muḥaqqaq (محقَّق) means "consummate" or "clear", and originally was used to denote any accomplished piece of calligraphy.

Often used to copy maṣāḥif (singular muṣḥaf, i.e. loose sheets of Quran texts), this intricate type of script was considered one of the most beautiful, as well as one of the most difficult to execute well. The script saw its greatest use in the Mamluk Sultanate era (1250–1516/1517).

In the Ottoman Empire, it was gradually displaced by Thuluth and Naskh; from the 18th century onward, its use was largely restricted to the Basmala in Hilyas.

== History ==
The earliest reference to muḥaqqaq writing is found in the Kitab al-Fihrist by Ibn al-Nadim, and the term was probably in use since the beginning of the Abbasid era to denote a specific writing style. Master calligraphers like Ibn Muqla and Ibn al-Bawwab contributed to the development of this and other scripts, and defined its rules and standards within Islamic calligraphy.

== Gallery ==
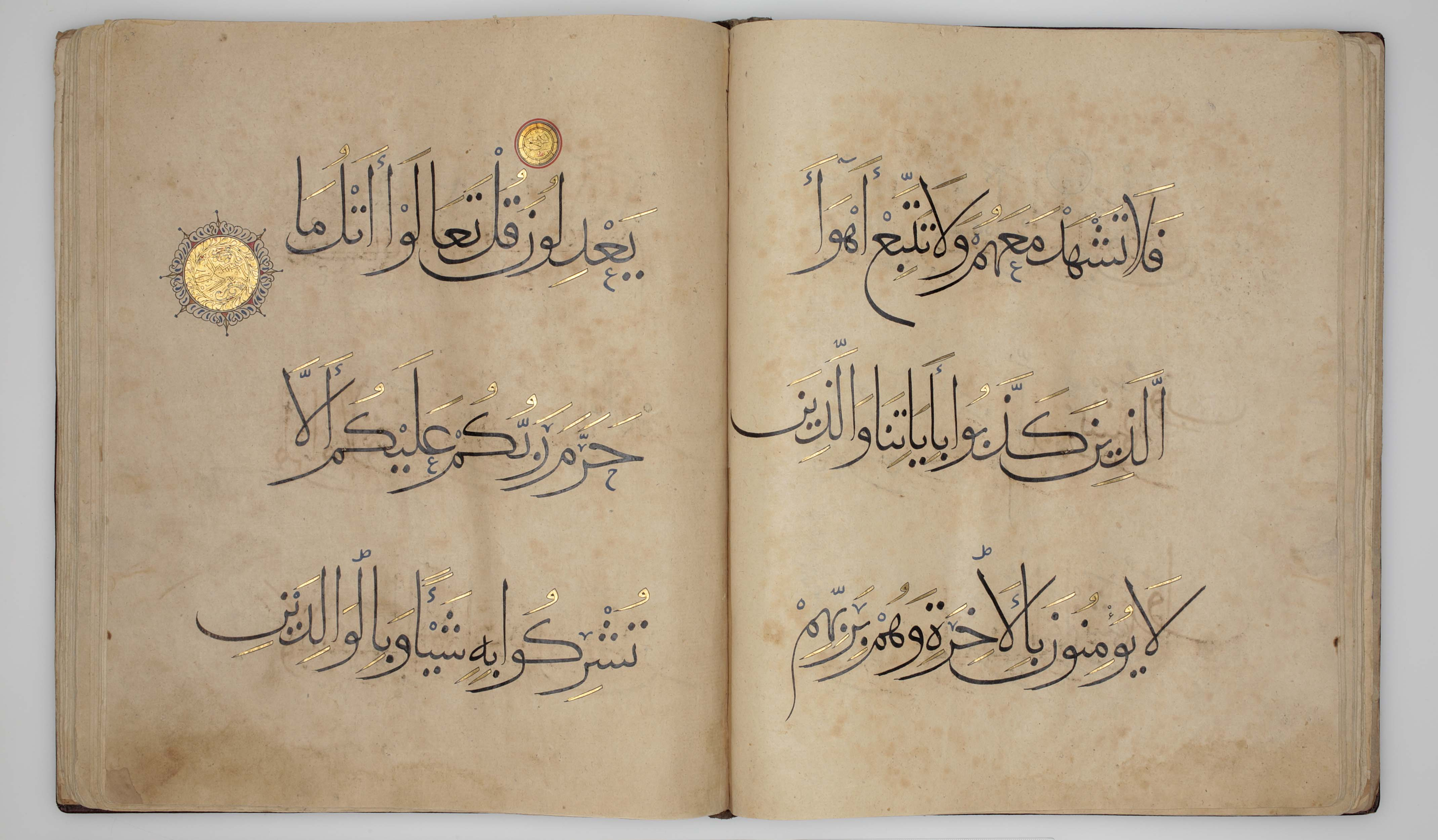
Double-page from the Qur'an in muhaqqaq dedicated to Abu’l-Qasim Harun ibn ‘Ali ibn Zafar, the vizier of Özbeg (r 1210–1225), the last atabak of Azerbaijan. Khalili Collection of Islamic Art

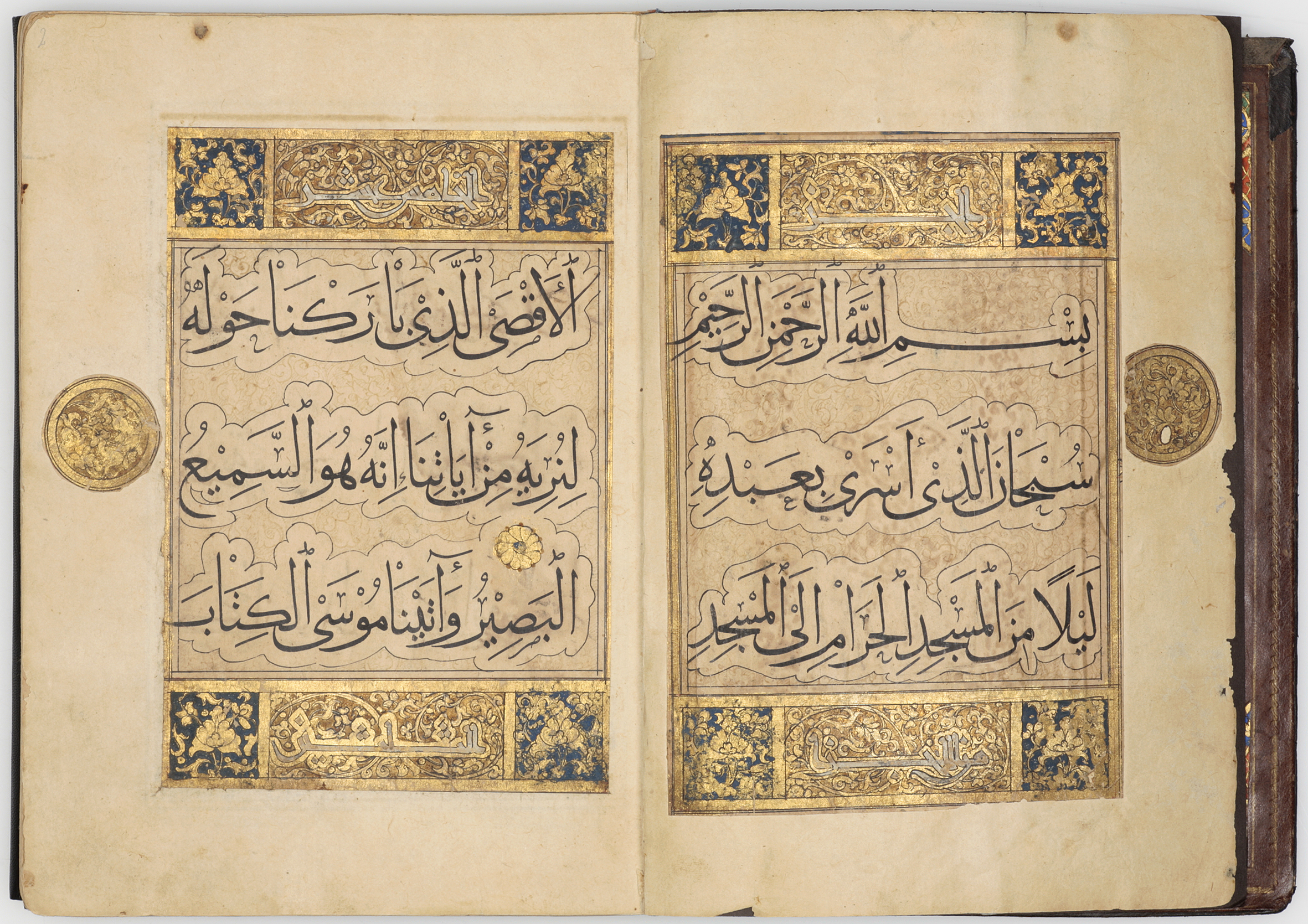
Double-page from the Qur'an in muhaqqaq copied by Yaqut al-Musta'simi. Baghdad, 1282/1283. Khalili Collection of Islamic Art

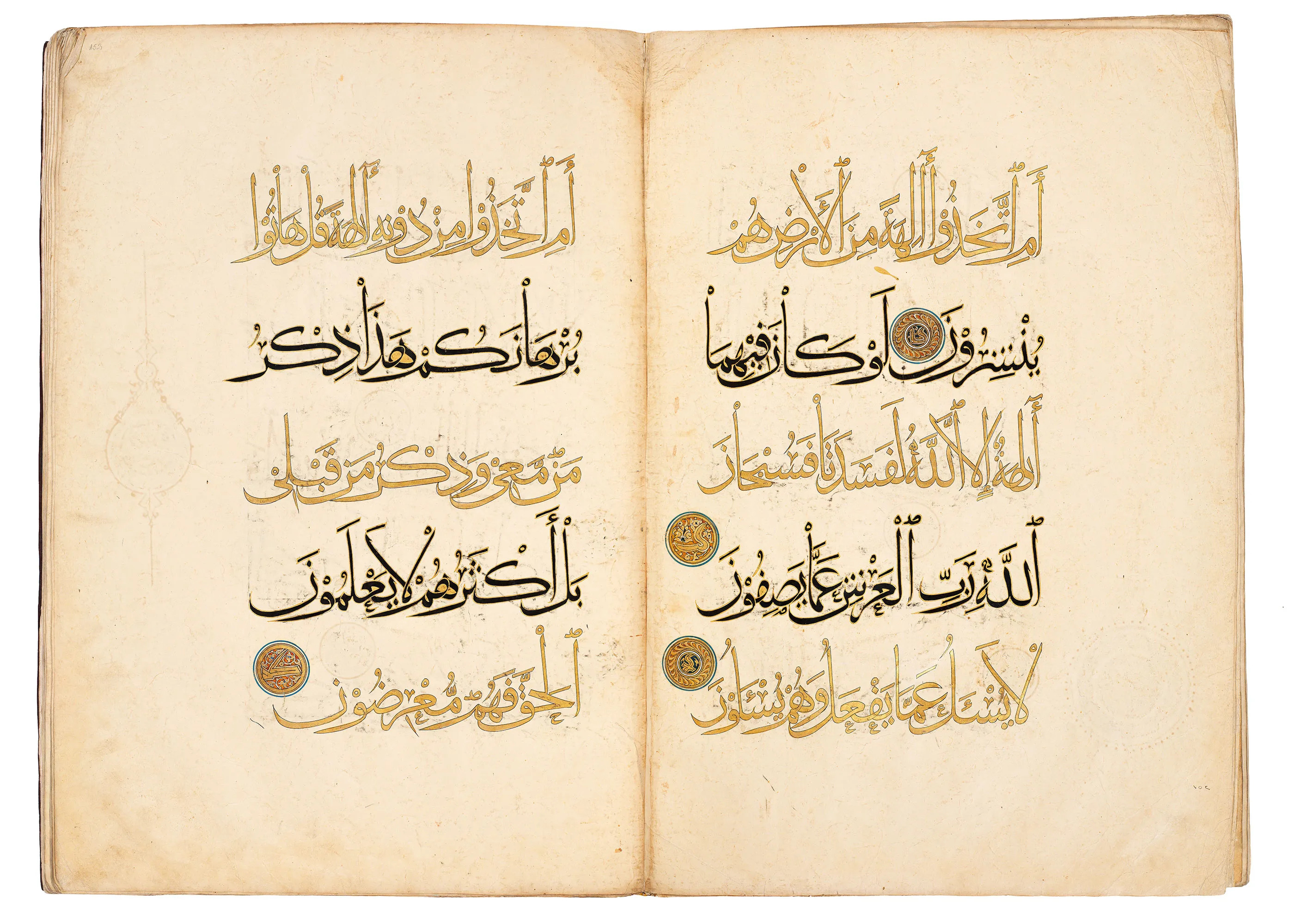
Double-page from the Qur'an in muhaqqaq copied by Ahmad al-Suhrawardi. Baghdad, 1307/1308. Turkish and Islamic Arts Museum

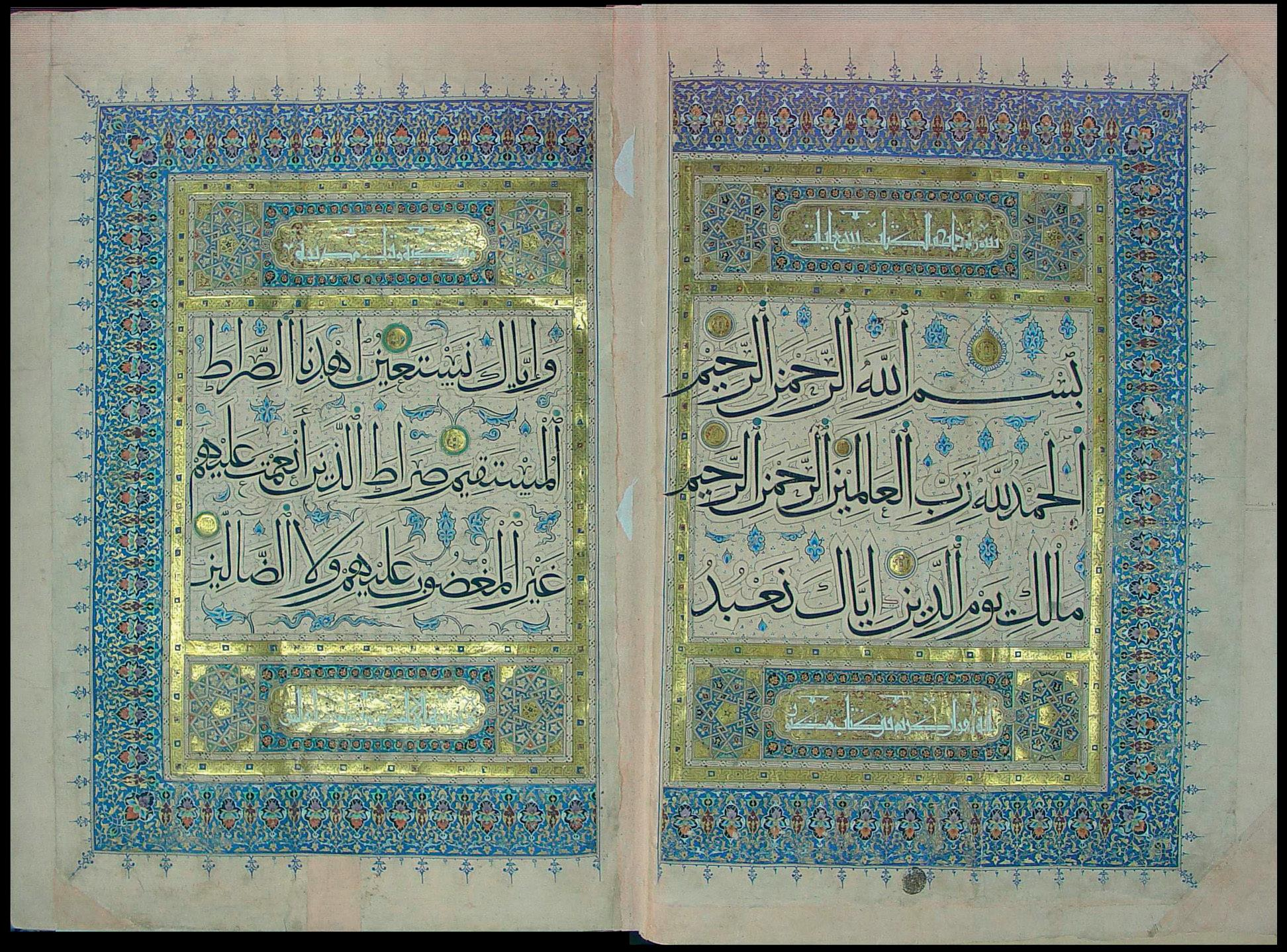
Opening pages from the Qur'an in muhaqqaq copied by Ali ibn Muhammad al-Mukattib al-Ashrafi. Cairo, 1372. Egyptian National Library

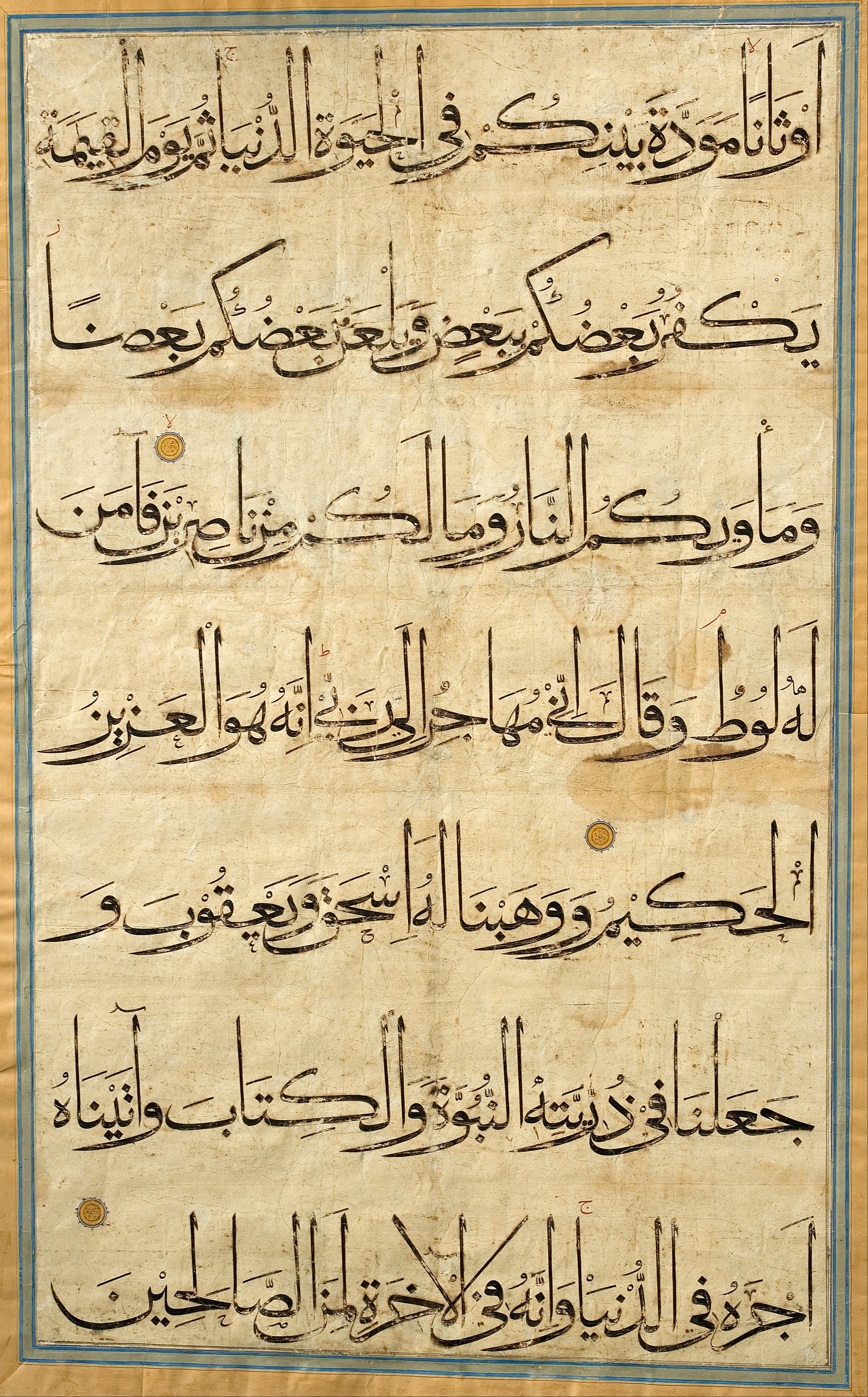
Page from the Qur'an in muhaqqaq copied for Timur by Umar Aqta. Samarkand, c. 1400. Museum of Islamic Art, Doha

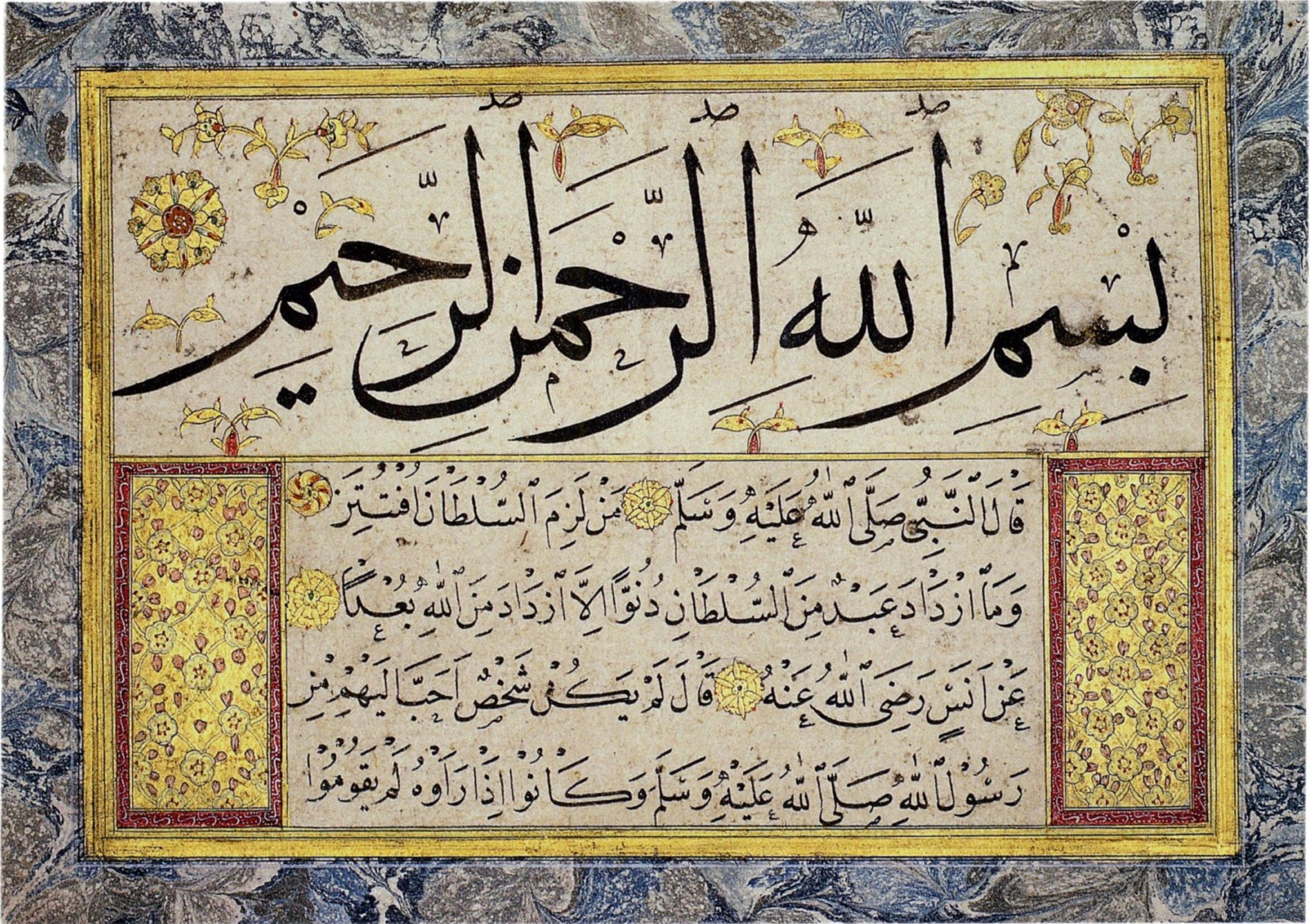
Album Leaf from a Muraqqa by Hâfiz Osman with basmala in muhaqqaq (upper panel). Istanbul, 1693/1694. Museum of Islamic Art, Berlin

== See also ==
- Arabic calligraphy
- Islamic calligraphy
