= Ahmed ibn Qassim ar-Rifa'i ar-Ribati =

Moroccan calligrapher

Ahmed ibn Qassim ar-Rifa'i ar-Ribati (Arabic: أحمد بن قاسم الرفاعي الرباطي) was a Moroccan calligrapher interested in the reformation and standardization of Maghrebi script.

While Arabic calligraphy had undergone standardization and reform in the Mashriq under Ibn Muqla and Ibn al-Bawwab, it hadn't done so in the Maghreb. ar-Ribati wrote Stringing the Pearls of the Thread (نظم لآلئ السمط في حسن تقويم بديع الخط) in 1840, which was edited and republished by Muhammad Sabri. The book is in the form of an urjuza of 143 couplets.
