= Almoravid dinar =

Almoravid currency

الدينار المرابطي (Arabic)
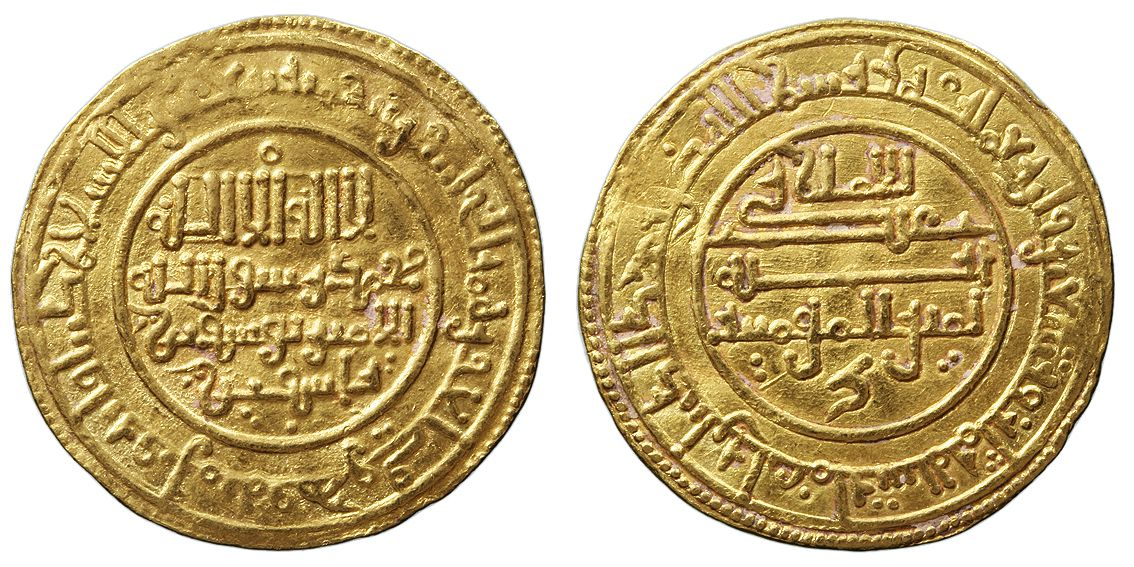
- Dinar minted under Yusuf ibn Tashfin in Aghmat.

The Almoravid dinar (Arabic: الدينار المرابطي) was a gold dinar coin minted under the Almoravid dynasty in the Maghreb and Iberia (al-Andalus). The mints that produced them were supplied by the West African gold mines south of the Sahara desert. The Almoravid dinars circulated widely beyond the reach of the empire; the Christian kingdoms of Iberia called them "marabotins" and "maravedís".

== History ==
When the Almoravids conquered Awdaghust around 1054, they gained control over the southern point of the trans-Saharan trade routes. When Abu Bakr ibn Umar led the capture of the Sijilmasa oases from the Maghrawa, they occupied the northern point. In this position, the Almoravids were able to control and profit from the trans-Saharan gold trade. Within two years of taking Sijilmasa, the entry point for gold into North Africa, dinars were struck there in the name of Abu Bakr ibn 'Umar.

When Yusuf ibn Tashfin officially became amir of the Almoravids in 1087, coins were struck with his name and the volume of production increased. In addition to Sijilmasa, coins were struck in several new mints, the first of which was in Aghmat in 1093. The mint in Aghmat had the highest output of any mint in North Africa until 1122, and Muhammad al-Idrisi noted in Nuzhat al-Mushtāq that under the Almoravids the population of Aghmat was the wealthiest.

From around 1096, Almoravid dinars were struck in al-Andalus, starting in Seville. There was a notable increase in production around 1104, the year after Ali ibn Yusuf was recognized as the heir to the empire; these coins featured his name along with his father's. Ronald A. Messier suggests that this was "aimed at publicizing the legitimacy of Ali's 'right' to the throne."

Under Ali, coin production greatly increased. Dinars were minted in Marrakesh, the newly established Almoravid capital, from around 1097. Four years later, they were also being minted in Fes, Tlemcen, and Nūl Lamta. The multiple cities minting coins helped the Almohad sultan solidify his control over distant parts of his empire; his name on the coins functioned as a sort of brand and symbol of authority to preempt possible revolts.

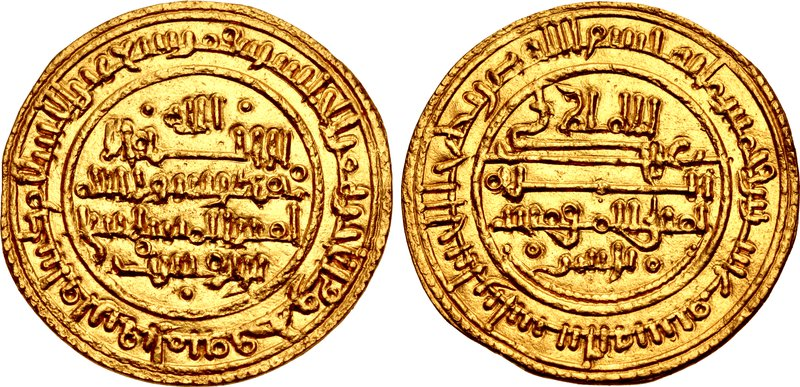
An Almoravid dinar minted under Ali ibn Yusuf in Seville featuring Almoravid Kufic script.

The greatest extent of Almoravid dinar production started around 1120 and lasted until around 1130; it was the peak of Almoravid prosperity when most of Ali's constructions took place. The most productive Andalusi mints at this time were in Almería, Seville, and Granada—the most important cities for international commerce.

With the threat of Ibn Tumart and the Almohad movement, Ali shifted his attention to the African part of his empire. Around 1130, more Almoravid dinars were made in Africa than in Iberia. From 1139 to 1146, Ibn Tumart's Almohads waged total war on the Almoravids until finally conquering Marrakesh. The economic effects of this conflict could be felt even in 1141, when Fesi merchants complained of the Almohad "usurpers."

The last Almoravid sultan, Ishaq ibn Ali, and some unknown Almoravid rebels minted a few dinars from 1146 to 1151.

Almoravid coins and coinage molds found in Algiers, National Museum of Antiquities and Islamic Art.

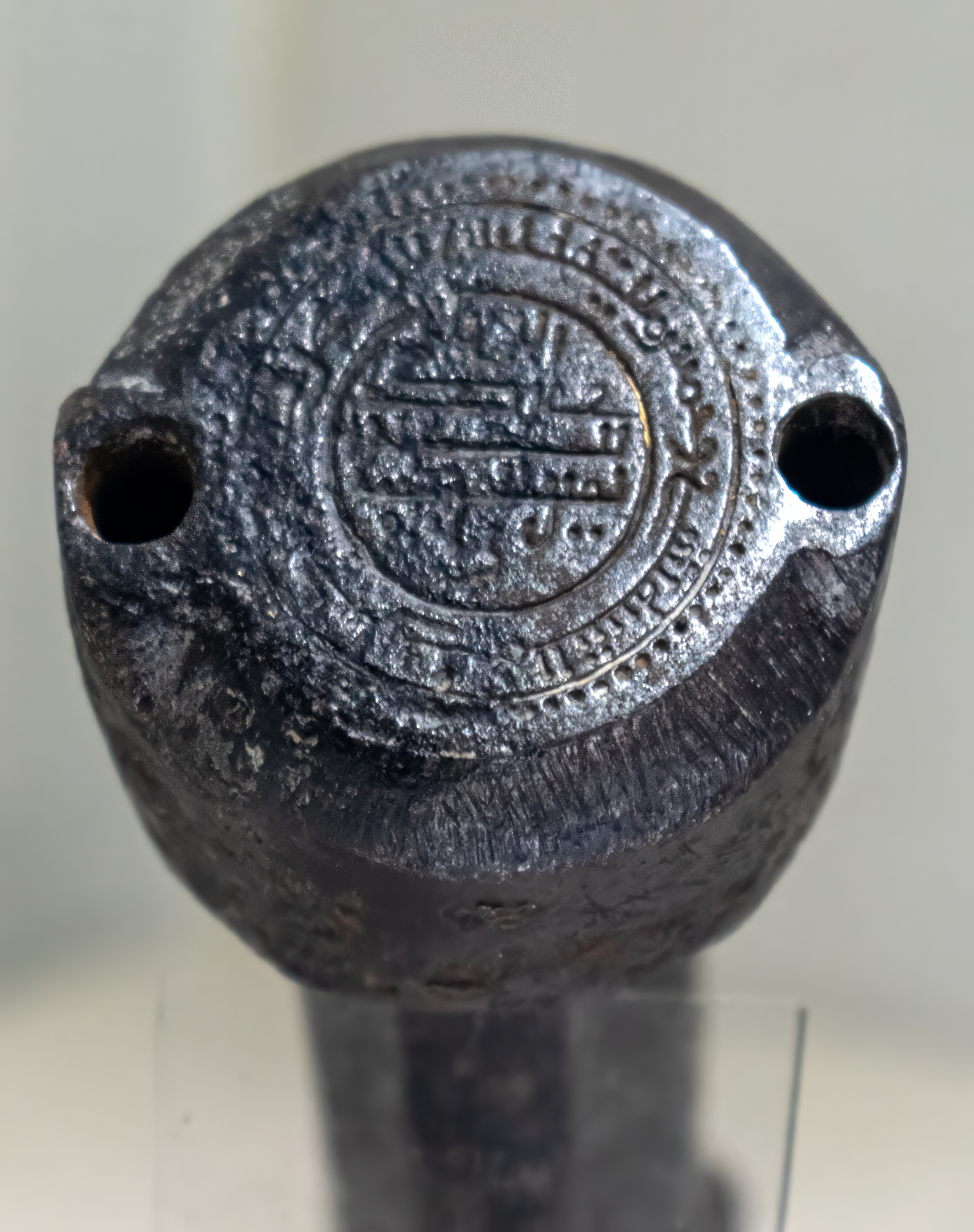
Almoravid coinage mold, 1117-1116.

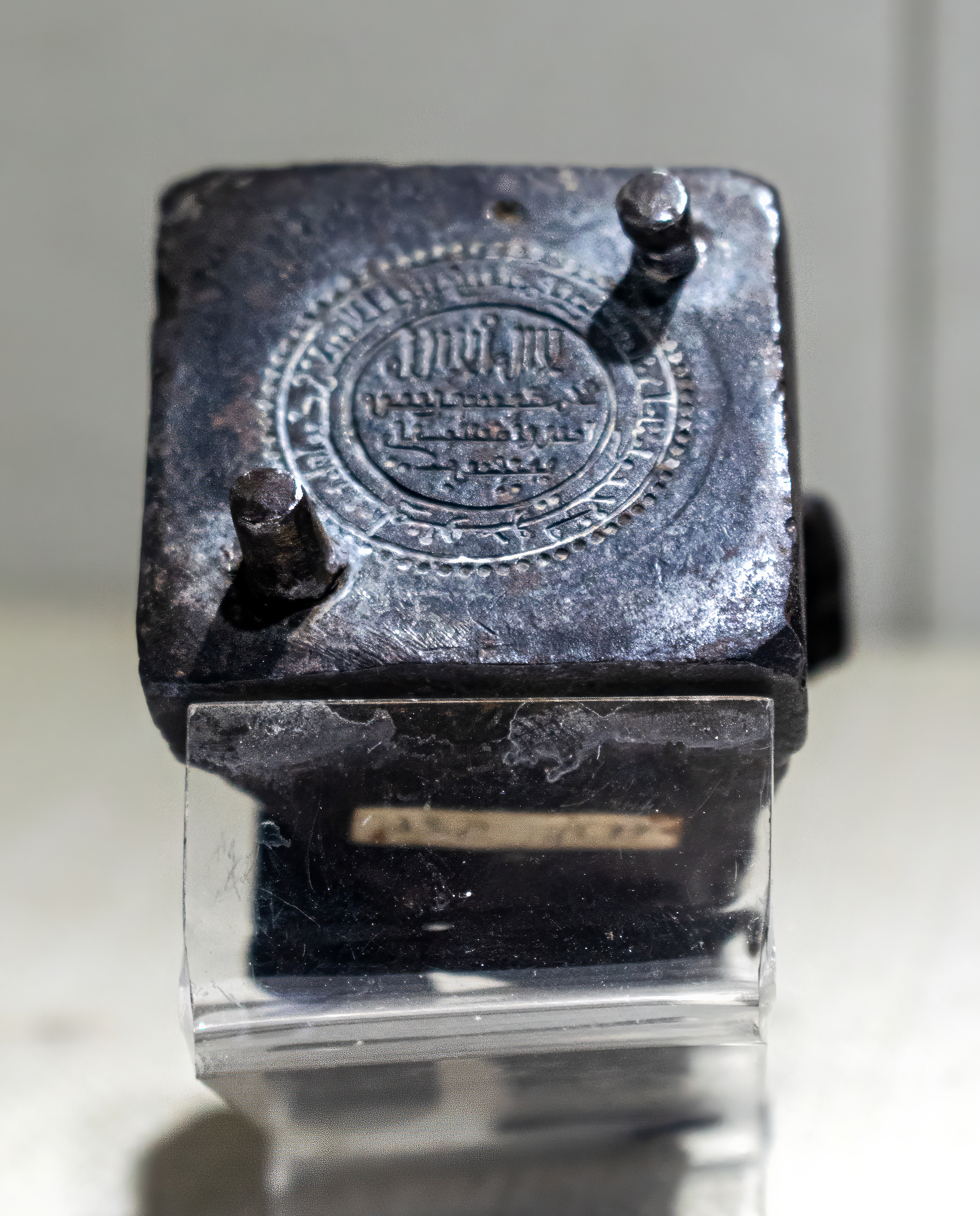
Almoravid coinage mold, 1117-1116.

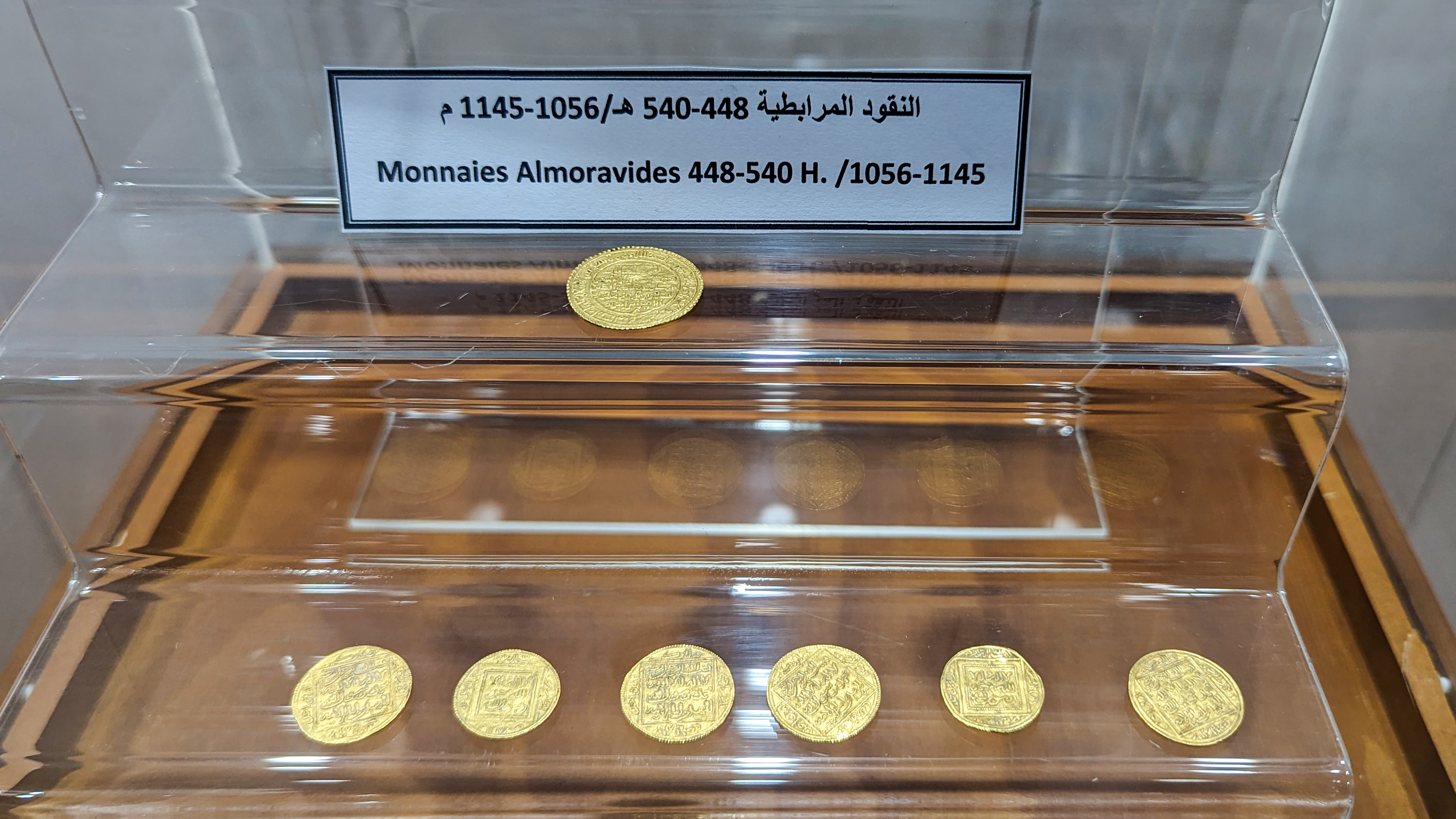
Golden coins of the Almoravid dynasty.

== Circulation ==
The Almoravids traded virtually exclusively with locally produced dinars. Under the Almoravids, al-Andalus exported goods to North Africa, Egypt, and France, among others. It also imported goods from many different areas, including China, India, Persia, the Middle East, North Africa, and Europe. Because of the extensive trade network of the Almoravids and the reputed quality of their coins, Mediterranean markets were flooded with Almoravid dinars for almost a century, and they competed with the Fatimid dinar as the dominant currency of Mediterranean trade.
