= Maghrebi script =

Form of Arabic script

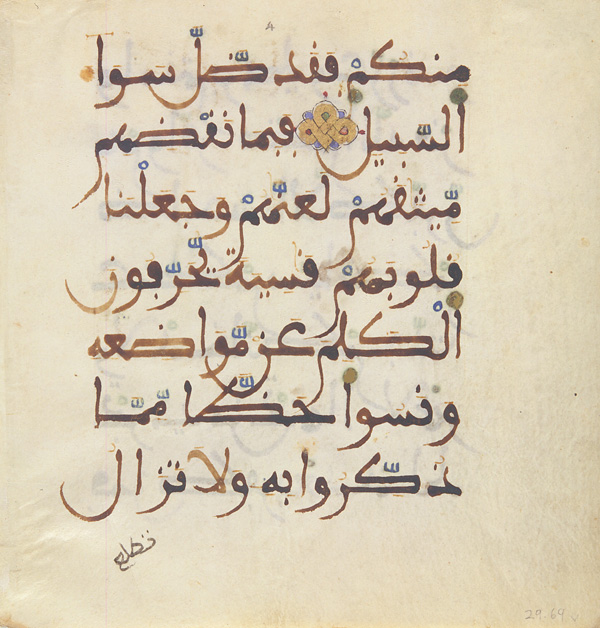
Maghrebi script from a 13th-century Qur'an in North Africa

Maghrebi script or Maghribi script or Maghrebi Arabic script (Arabic: الخط المغربي) refers to a loosely related family of Arabic scripts that developed in the Maghreb (North Africa), al-Andalus (Iberia), and Bilad as-Sudan (the West African Sahel). Maghrebi script is directly derived from the Kufic script, and is traditionally written with a pointed tip (القلم المدبَّب), producing a line of even thickness.

The script is characterized by rounded letter forms, extended horizontal features, and final open curves below the baseline. It also differs from Mashreqi scripts in the notation of the letters faa' (Maghrebi: ڢ ; Mashreqi: ف) and qāf (Maghrebi: ڧ ; Mashreqi: ق).

For centuries, Maghrebi script was used to write Arabic manuscripts and record Andalusi and Moroccan literature, whether in Classical Arabic, Maghrebi Arabic, or Amazigh languages.

== History ==
=== Origins ===
Arabic script first came to the Maghreb with the Islamic conquests (643–709). The conquerors, led by Uqba ibn Nafi, used both Hijazi and Kufic scripts, as demonstrated in coins minted in 711 under Musa ibn Nusayr. Maghrebi script is a direct descendant of the old Kufic script that predated Ibn Muqla's al-khat al-mansub (الخَط المَنْسُوب proportioned line) standardization reforms, which affected Mashreqi scripts. The Arabic script in its Iraqi Kufic form spread from centers such as Fes, Cordoba, and Qayrawan throughout the region along with Islam, as the Quran was studied and transcribed. Qayrawani Kufic script developed in al-Qayrawan from the Iraqi Kufic script.

=== African and Andalusi scripts ===
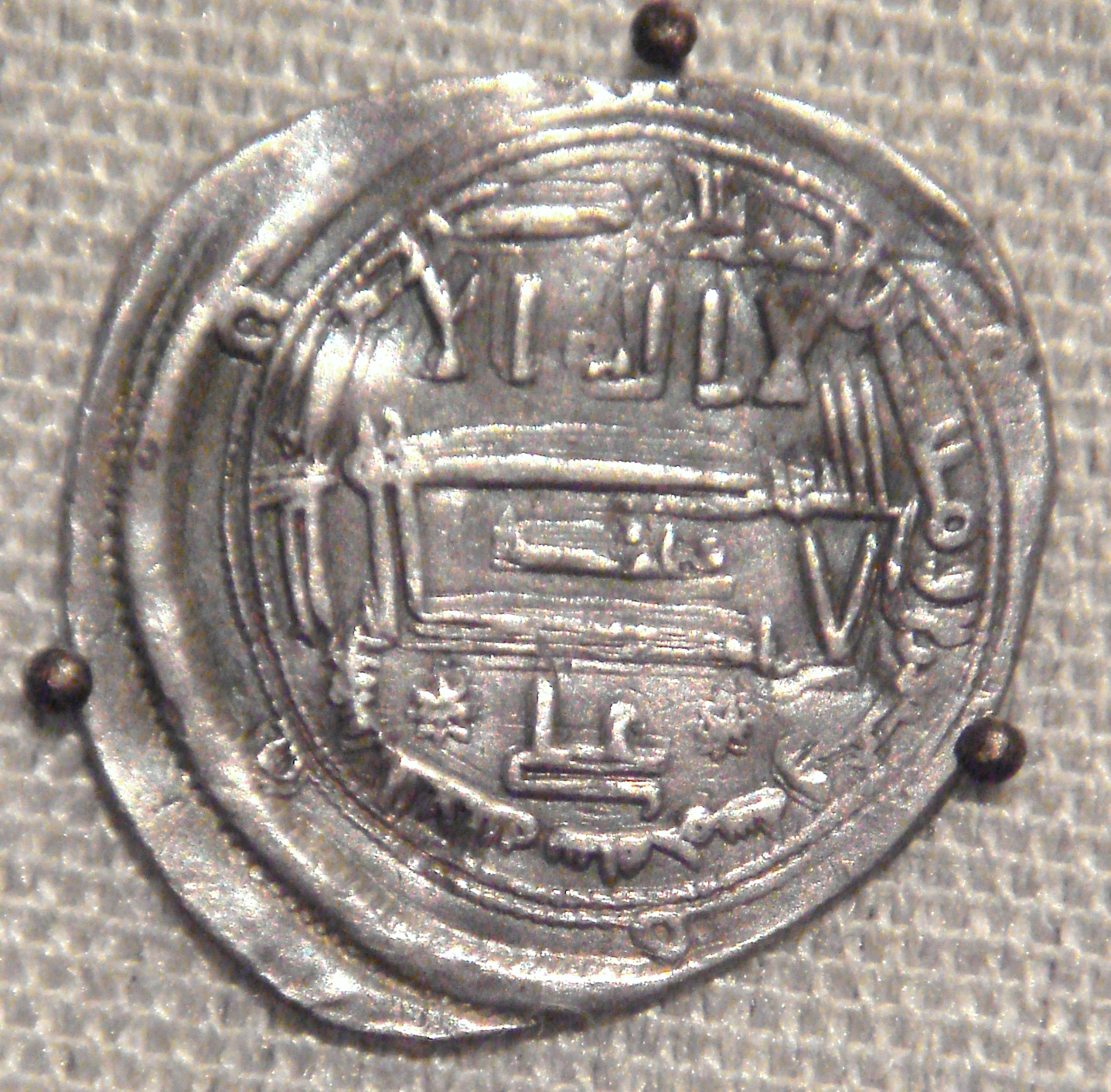
Iraqi Kufic script, as seen on this Idrisid dirham, influenced the early development of Maghrebi script.

Early on, there were two schools of Maghrebi script: the African script (الخط الإفريقي, al-khaṭṭ al-ʾifrīqiyy) and the Andalusi script (الخط الأندلسي, al-khaṭṭ al-ʾandalusiyy). The African script evolved in Ifriqiya (Tunisia) from Iraqi Kufic by way of the Kufic of Qairawan. The Andalusi script evolved in Iberia from the Damascene Kufic script with the establishment of the second Umayyad state, which would become the Caliphate of Córdoba. The Andalusi script was particular for its rounded letters, as attested to in Al-Maqdisi's geography book The Best Divisions in the Knowledge of the Regions. The African script had spread throughout the Maghreb before the spread of the Andalusi script. One of the most famous early users of the Arabic script was Salih ibn Tarif, the leader of the Barghawata Confederacy and the author of a religious text known as the Quran of Salih.

In al-Maghreb al-Aqsa (المغرب الأڧصى, 'the Far West', modern-day Morocco), the script developed independently from the Kufic of the Maghrawa and Bani Ifran under the Idrisid dynasty (788–974); it gained Mashreqi features under the Imam Idris I, who came from Arabia. The script under the Idrisids was basic and unembellished; it was influenced by Iraqi Kufic, which was used on the Idrisid dirham.

=== Imperial patronage ===
==== Almoravid ====
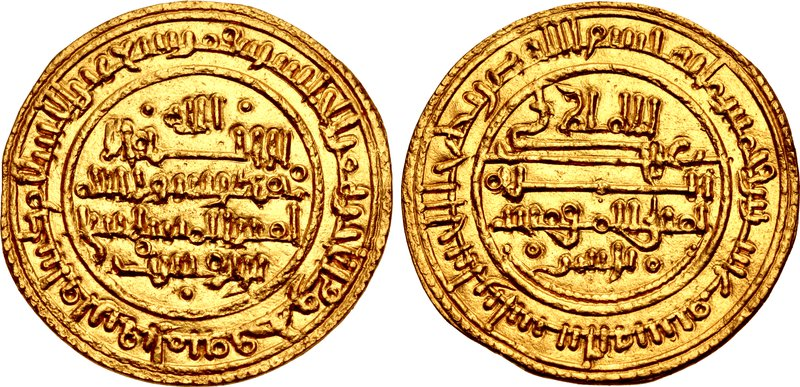
An Almoravid dinar minted under Ali ibn Yusuf in Seville featuring Almoravid Kufic script.

Under the Almoravid dynasty, the Andalusi script spread throughout the Maghreb, reaching Qairawan; the Jerīd region, however, kept the African script. A version of Kufic with florid features developed at this time. The University of al-Qarawiyyin, the Almoravid Qubba, and the Almoravid Minbar bear examples of Almoravid Kufic.

The Kufic script of the Almoravid dinar was imitated in a maravedí issued by Alfonso VIII of Castile.

The minbar of the al-Qarawiyyin Mosque, created in 1144, was the "last major testament of Almoravid patronage," and features what is now called Maghrebi thuluth, an interpretation of Eastern thuluth and diwani traditions.

==== Almohad ====
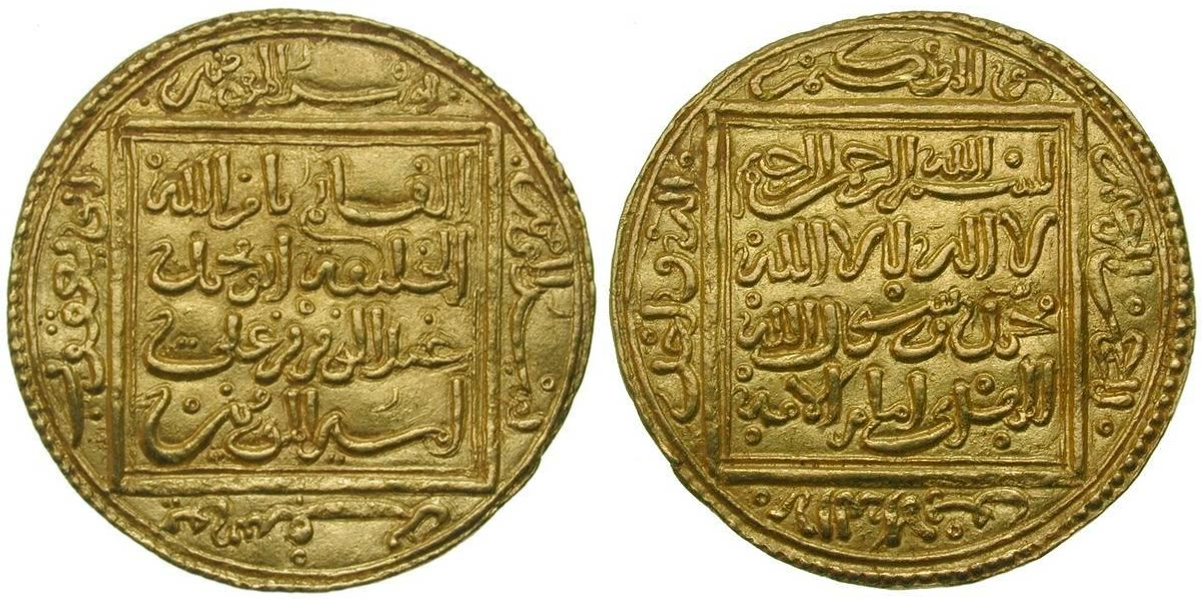
Almohad dirham minted in curvilinear Maghrebi thuluth script under Abu Yaqub Yusuf.

Illuminated parchment manuscript of Ibn Tumart's Counterpart of the Muwatta (محاذي الموطأ) copied for the Almohad sultan Yaqub al-Mansur around 1193. The script is Maghrebi thuluth in gold with lapis lazuli vocalization.

Under the Almohad dynasty, Arabic calligraphy continued to flourish and a variety of distinct styles developed. The Almohad caliphs, many of whom were themselves interested in Arabic script, sponsored professional calligraphers, inviting Andalusi scribes and calligraphers to settle in Marrakesh, Fes, Ceuta, and Rabat. The Almohad caliph Abu Hafs Umar al-Murtada established the first public manuscript transcription center at the madrasa of his mosque in Marrakesh (now the Ben Youssef Madrasa).

The Maghrebi thuluth script was appropriated and adopted as an official "dynastic brand" used in different media, from manuscripts to coinage to fabrics. The Almohads also illuminated certain words or phrases for emphasis with gold leaf and lapis lazuli.

For centuries, the Maghrebi script was used to write Arabic manuscripts that were traded throughout the Maghreb. According to Muhammad al-Manuni, there were 104 paper mills in Fes under the reign of Yusuf Ibn Tashfin in the 11th century, and 400 under the reign of Sultan Yaqub al-Mansur in the 12th century.

==== Nasrid ====
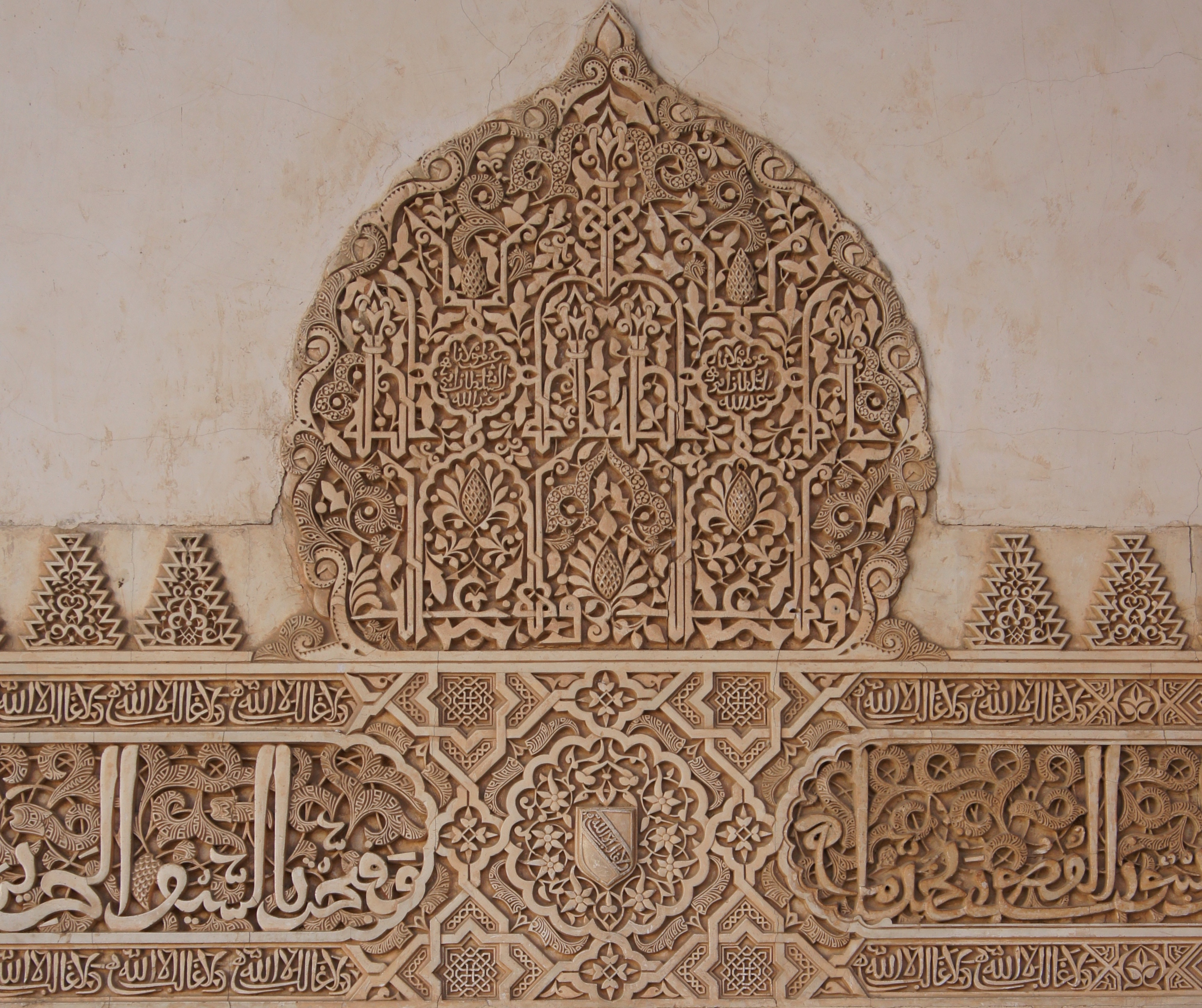
Different scripts at the Alhambra built in the Emirate of Granada. The exodus of Muslims from Iberia influenced the development of scripts in North Africa.

In the Emirate of Granada under the Nasrid dynasty, and particularly under Yusuf I and Muhammad V, Arabic epigraphy further developed. Kufic inscriptions developed extended vertical strokes forming ribbon-like decorative knots. Kufic script also had "an enormous influence on the decorative and graphic aspects of Christian art."

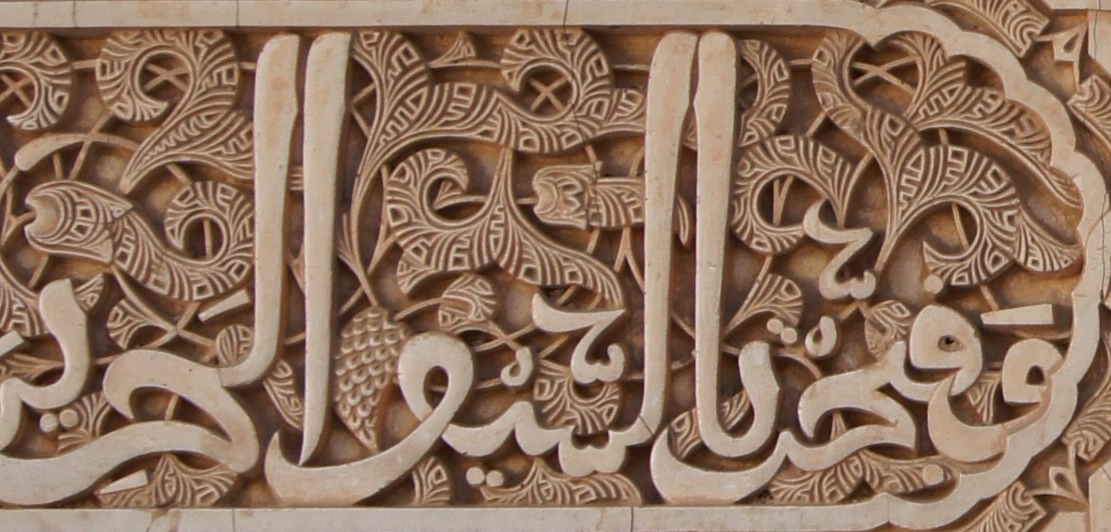
وفتحت بالسيف الجزيرة
"And the peninsula was conquered with the sword"

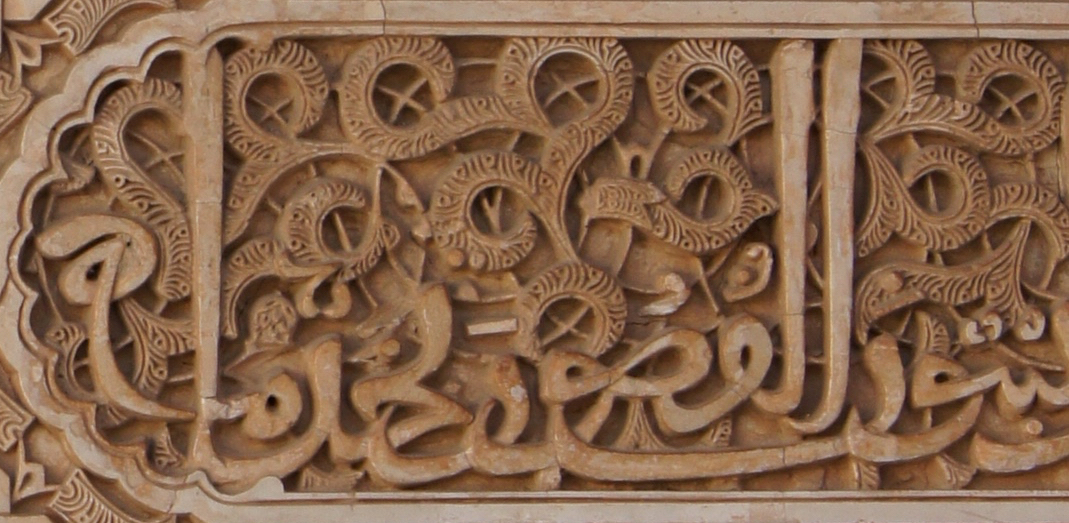
يبنون القصور تخدما
"They build palaces diligently"

Epigraphic samples from the Court of the Myrtles: what Muhammad Kurd Ali described as Andalusi mushabbak (sinuous) script (خط أندلسي مُشَبَّك), or what Western sources refer to as Nasrid cursive.

=== Aljamiado ===
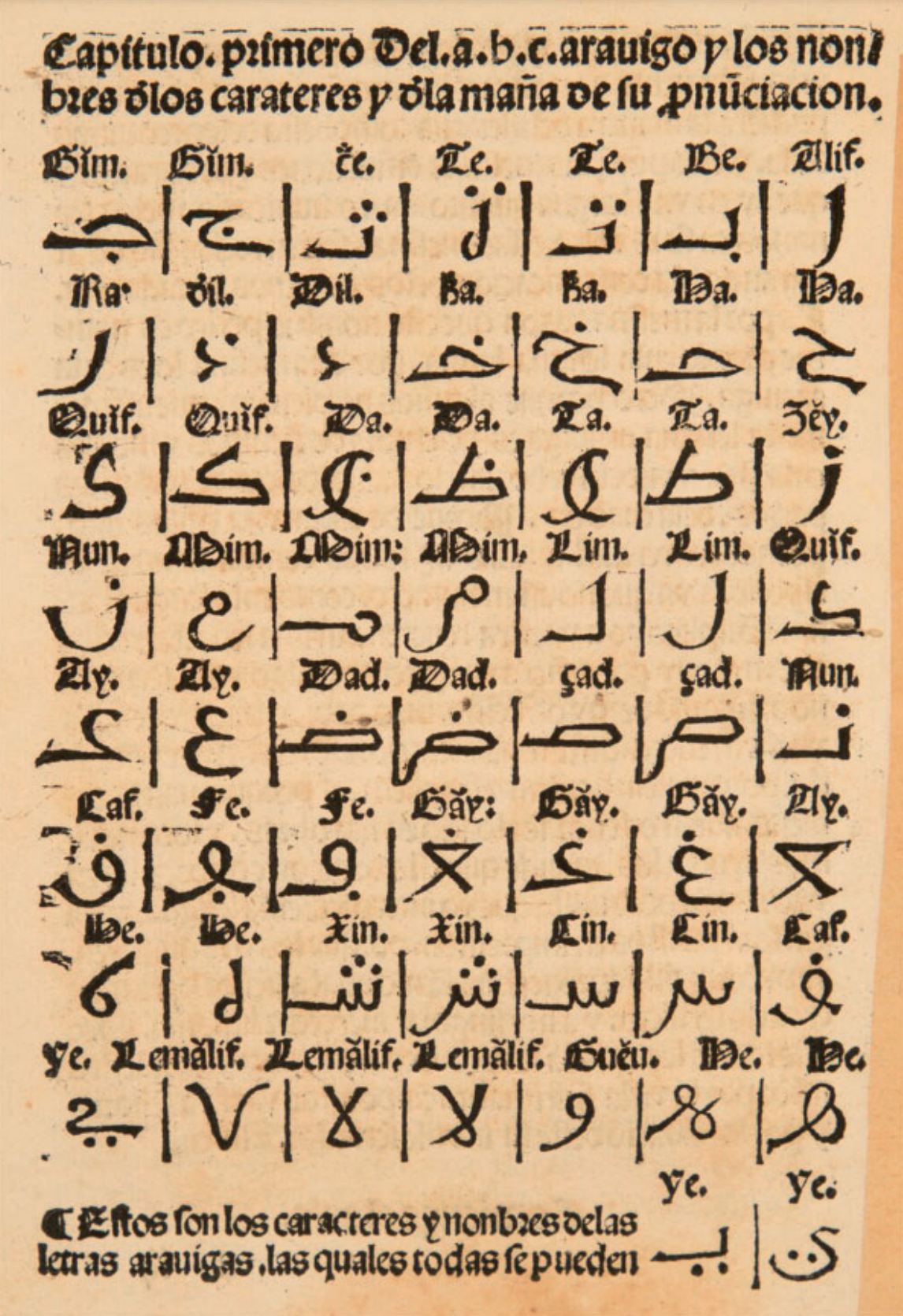
Maghrebi letters appeared in the first known Arabic alphabet to have been printed, in a 1505 book of the Spanish lexicographer Pedro de Alcalá.

In Iberia, the Arabic script was used to write Romance languages such as Mozarabic, Portuguese, Spanish or Ladino. This writing system was referred to as Aljamiado, from ʿajamiyah (عجمية).

=== Fesi Andalusi script ===
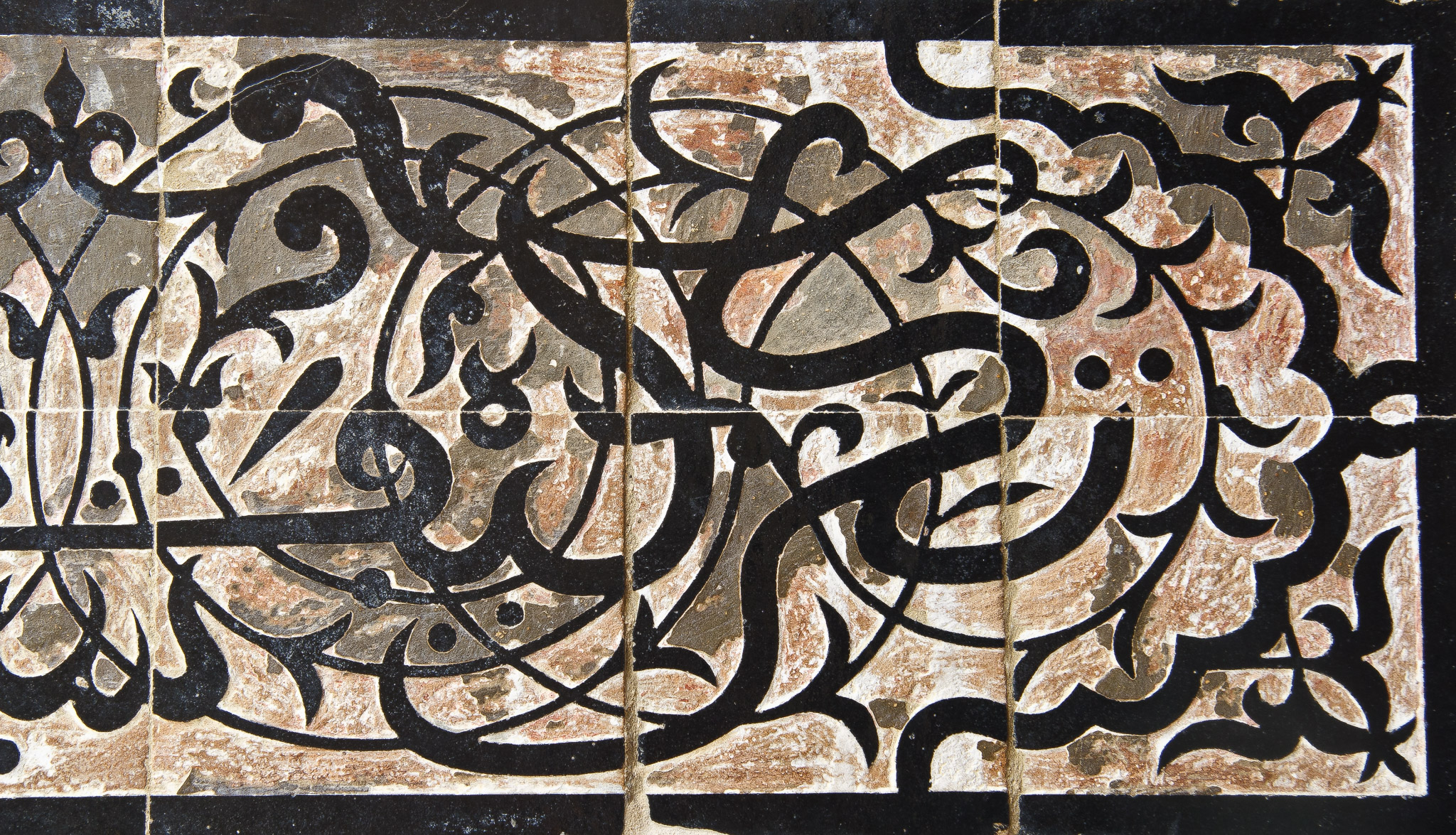
Maghrebi script at the Bou Inania Madrasa.

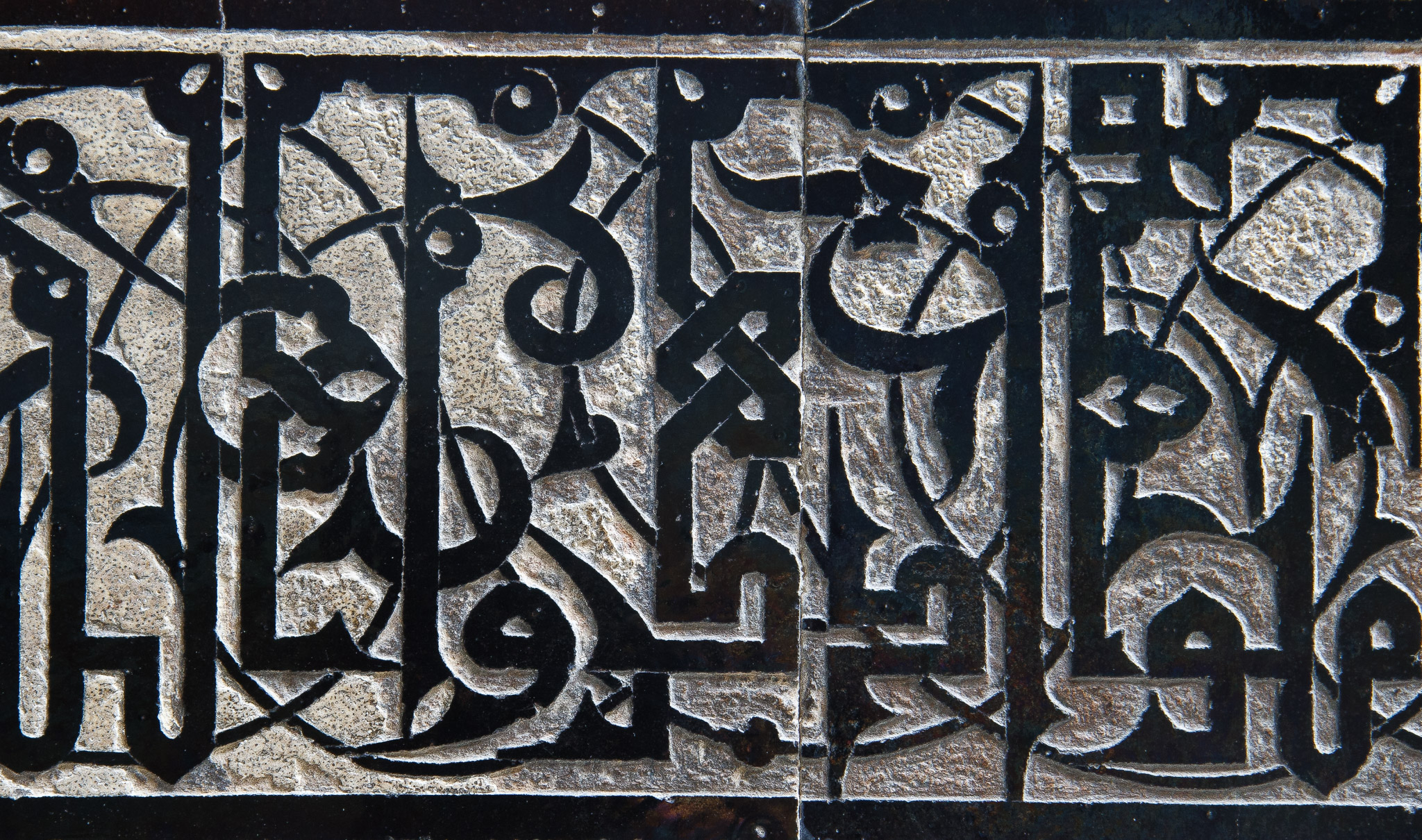
Foliate Marinid Kufic at Al-Attarine Madrasa.

Waves of migration from Iberia throughout the history of al-Andalus impacted writing styles in North Africa. Ibn Khaldun noted that the Andalusi script further developed under the Marinid dynasty (1244–1465), when Fes received Andalusi refugees. In addition to Fes, the script flourished in cities such as Ceuta, Taza, Meknes, Salé, and Marrakesh, although the script experienced a regression in rural areas far from the centers of power. The Fesi script spread throughout much of the Islamic west. Octave Houdas gives the exception of the region around Algiers, which was more influenced by the African script of Tunisia. Muhammad al-Manuni noted that Maghrebi script essentially reached its final form during the Marinid period, as it became independent of the Andalusi script. There were three forms of Maghrebi script in use: one in urban centers such as those previously mentioned, one in rural areas used to write in both Arabic and Amazigh, and one that preserved Andalusi features. Maghrebi script was also divided into different varieties: Kufic, mabsūt, mujawhar, Maghrebi thuluth, and musnad (z'mami).

=== Saadi reforms ===
The reforms in the Saadi period (1549–1659) affected manuscript culture and calligraphy. The Saadis founded centers for learning calligraphy, including the madrasa of the Mouassine Mosque, which was directed by a dedicated calligrapher as was the custom in the Mashreq. Sultan Ahmad al-Mansur himself was proficient in Maghrebi thuluth, and even invented a secret script for his private correspondences. Decorative scripts flourished under the Saadi dynasty and were used in architecture, manuscripts, and coinage.

=== Alawi era ===
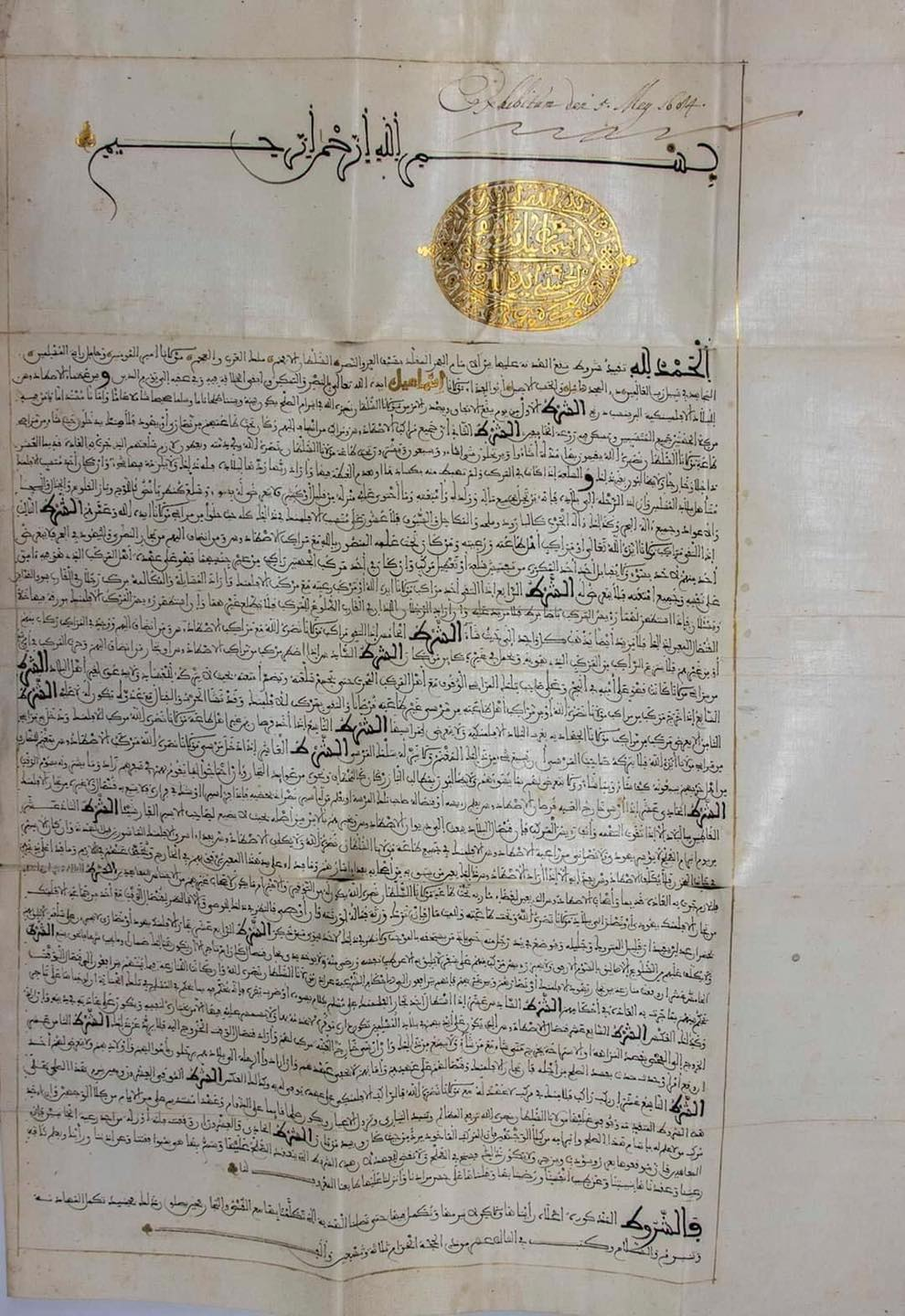
A 1682 peace treaty signed with the Dutch Republic under Sultan Ismail Ibn Sharif.

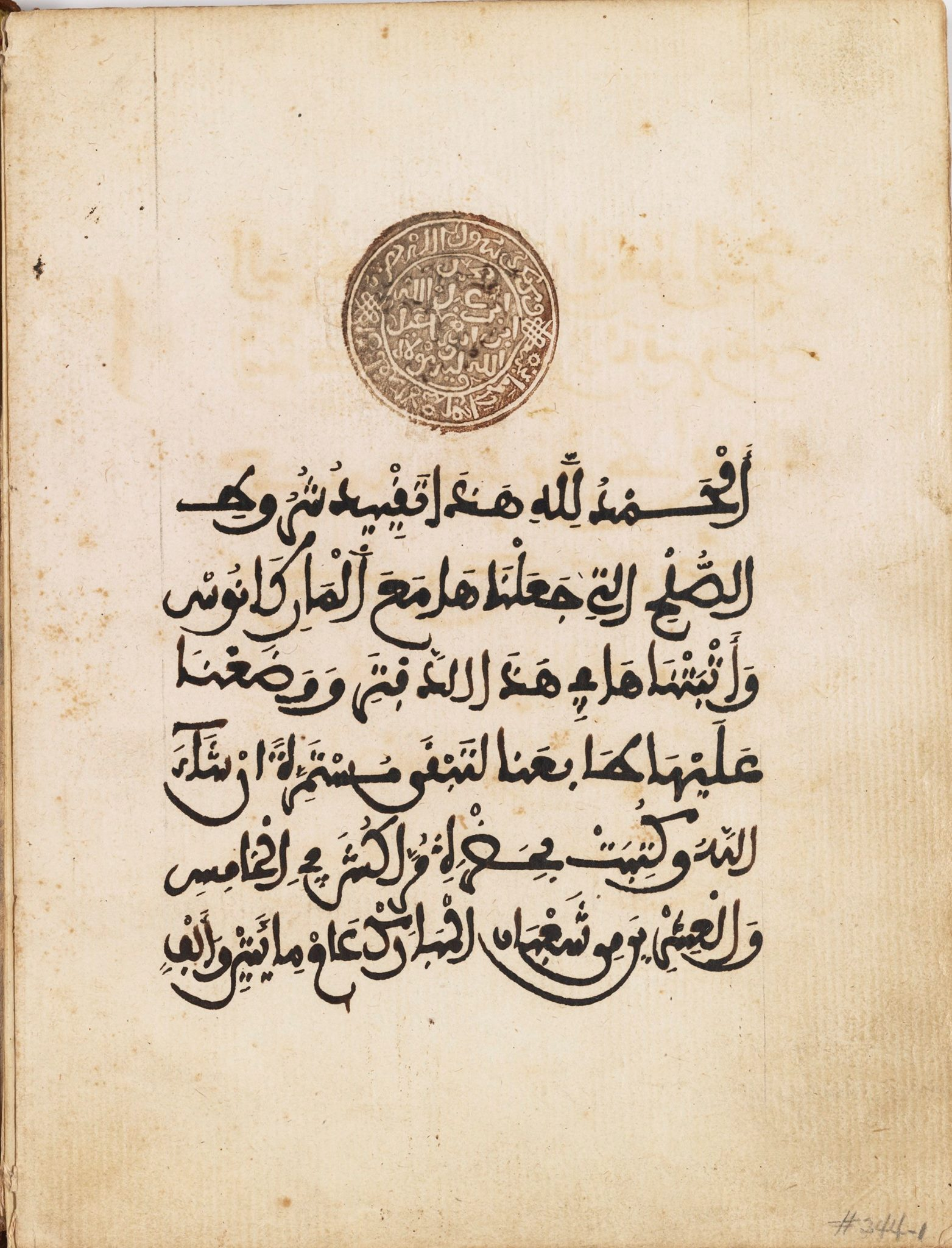
The 1787 Moroccan-American Treaty of Friendship created under Sultan Mohammed ben Abdallah.

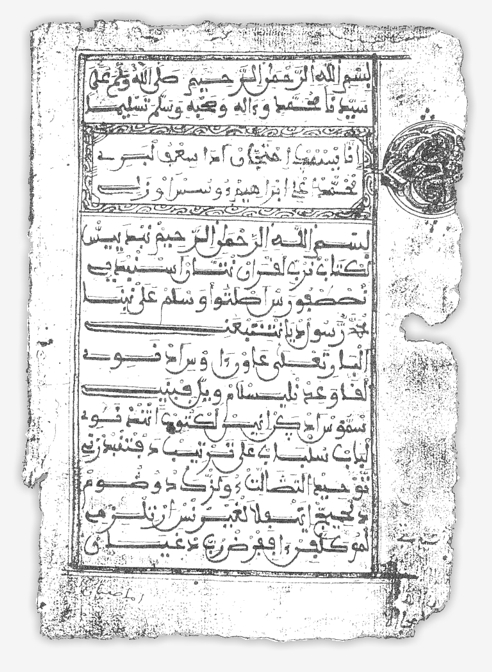
18th-century manuscript of Mohammed Awzal's al-Ḥawḍ, containing text in Tashelhit written in Maghrebi script.

Maghrebi script was supported by the 17th-century Alawite sultans Al-Rashid and Ismail. Under the reign of Sultan Muhammad III, the script devolved into an unrefined, illegible badawi script (الخط البدوي) associated with rural areas. Under Sultan Suleiman, the script improved in urban areas and particularly in the capital Meknes. Meanwhile, Rabat and Salé preserved some features of Andalusi script, and some rural areas such as Dukāla, Beni Zied, and al-Akhmas excelled in the Maghrebi script.

The script quality then regressed again, which led Ahmed ibn Qassim ar-Rifā'ī ar-Ribātī to start a script reform and standardization movement as Ibn Muqla and Ibn al-Bawwab had done in the Mashriq. He authored Stringing the Pearls of the Thread (نظم لآلئ السمط في حسن تقويم بديع الخط), a book in the form of an urjuza on the rules of Maghrebi script.

Muhammad Bin Al-Qasim al-Qundusi, active in Fes from 1828–1861, innovated a unique style known as al-Khatt al-Qundusi (الخط القندوسي).

After Muhammad at-Tayib ar-Rudani introduced the first Arabic lithographic printing press to Morocco in 1864, the mujawher variety of the Maghrebi script became the standard for printing body text, although other varieties were also used.

==== Colonial period ====
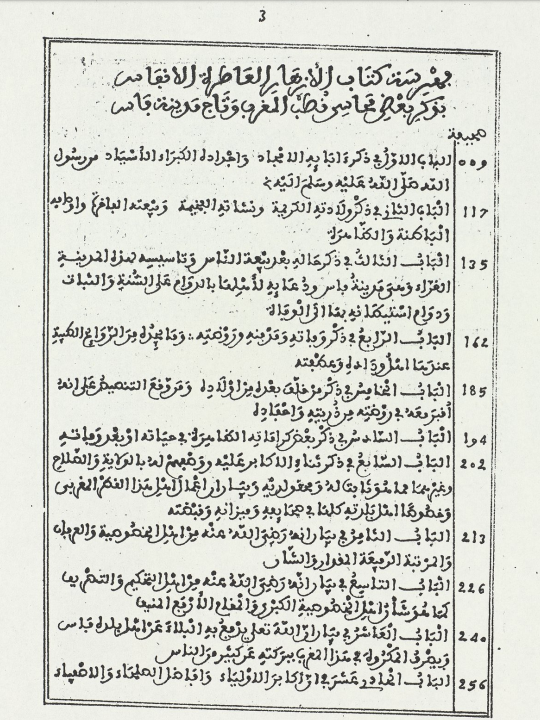
Page of a lithographed book in mujawhar script, circa 1896.

Arabic of the Treaty of Fes (right) written in a mujawhar style.

The French Protectorate in Morocco represented a crisis for Maghrebi script, as Latin script became dominant in education and public life, and the Moroccan Nationalist Movement fought to preserve Maghrebi script in response. In 1949, Muhammad bin al-Hussein as-Sūsī and Antonio García Jaén published Ta'līm al-Khatt al-Maghrebi (تعليم الخط المغربي) a series of five booklets teaching Maghrebi script printed in Spain.

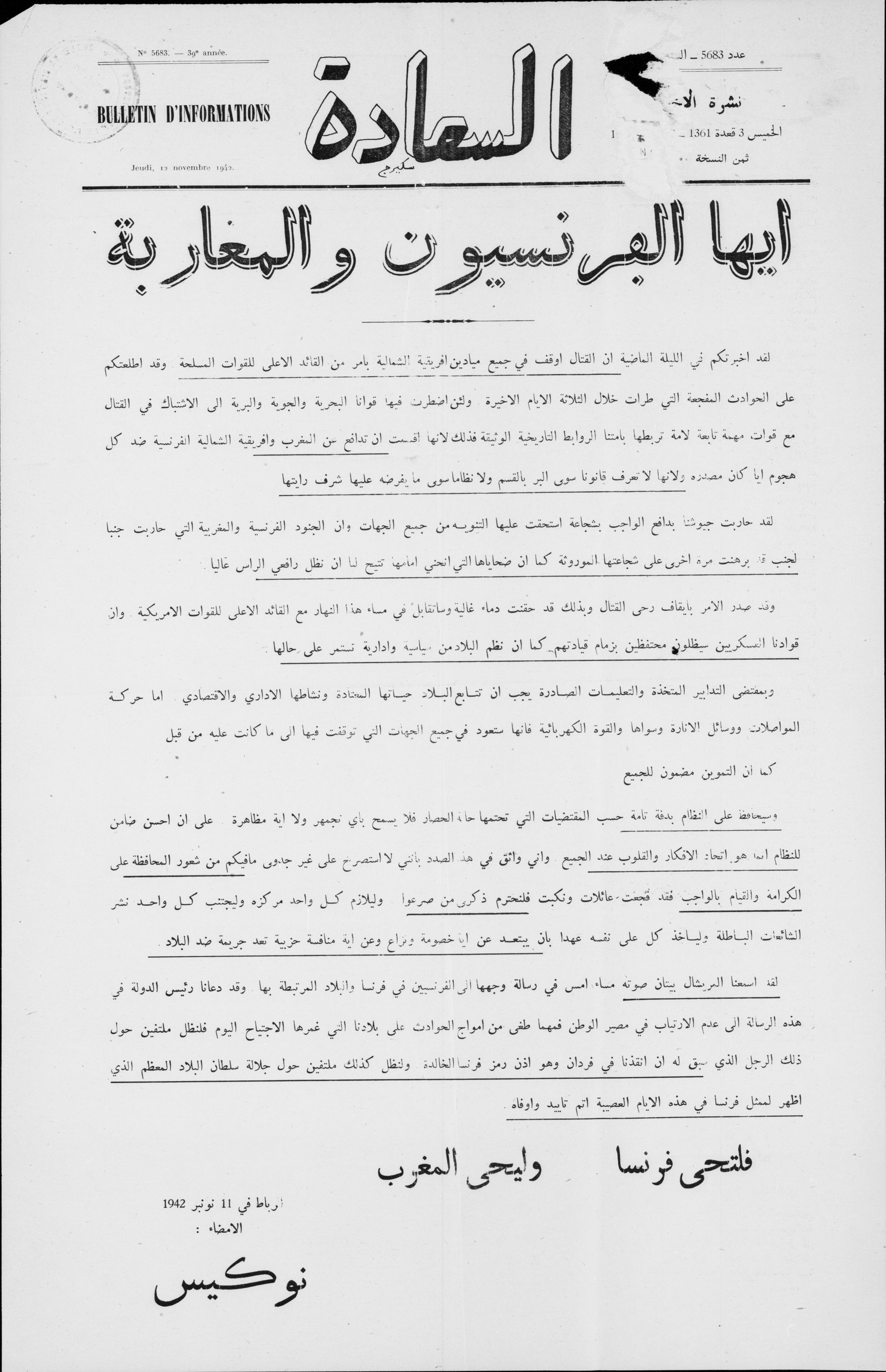
In this edition of es-Saada from 1942, the Maghrebi ڢ appears in the headline but the Mashreqi ف is used in the body text.

Additionally, books from the Mashreq printed in naskh scripts were imported for use in schools and universities, and handwriting began to be taught with mashreqi letter forms.

==== Post-independence ====
In the period after independence, there were a number of initiatives to modernize Arabic script to suit the typewriter, prominent among which was that of the Moroccan linguist Ahmed al-Akhdar al-Ghazal of the Institute for Studies and Research on Arabization: Standard Arabic Script (الحرف العربي المعياري).

=== Recently ===
In 2007, Muḥammad al-Maghrāwī and Omar Afa cowrote Maghrebi Script: History, Present, and Horizons (الخط المغربي: تاريخ وواقع وآفاق). The following year, the Muhammad VI Prize for the Art of Maghrebi Script, organized by the Moroccan Ministry of Islamic Affairs, was announced.

In early 2020, the President of Tunisia, Kais Saied, garnered significant media attention for his handwritten official letters in the Maghrebi script.

== Variations ==
In the book al-Khat al-Maghrebi, five main subscripts of Maghrebi script are identified:

1. Maghrebi Kufic (كوفي مغربي) variations of Kufic script used in the Maghreb and al-Andalus.
  - Almoravid Kufic (كوفي مرابطي) a decorative script that does not receive Arabic diacritics. It was used in coin minting and is usually accompanied by fine floral designs. The Almoravid minbar of the Kutubiyya Mosque in Marrakesh features a fine example.
  - Almohad Kufic (كوفي موحدي)
  - Marinid Kufic (كوفي مريني)
  - Alawite Kufic (كوفي علوي)
  - Qayrawani Kufic (كوفي قيرواني)
  - Pseudo Kufic (شبه كوفي)
2. Mabsout (مبسوط) script, used for body text and to write the Quran, similar in usage to the eastern Naskh.
  - Andalusi Mabsout
  - Saadi Mabsout
  - Alawite Mabsout
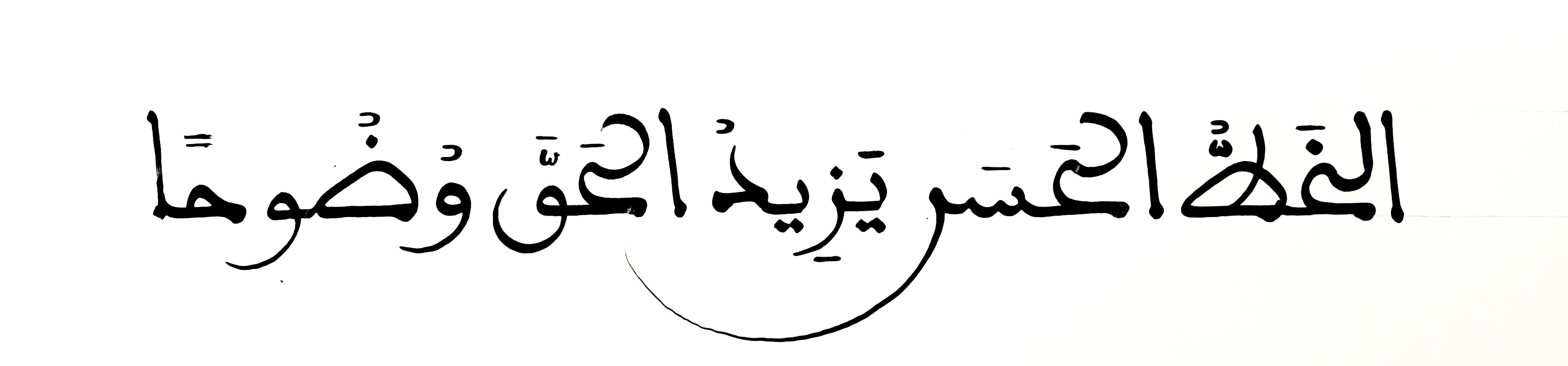
    A hand-drawn phrase in Maghrebi mabsout. It reads: "الخط الحسن يزيد الحق وضوحا" which means something similar to "A fine line increases the clarity of truth."
3. Mujawher (مجوهر) cursive script, mainly used by the king to announce laws. This is the script that was used for body text when lithographic prints started to be produced in Fes.
4. Thuluth Maghrebi (ثلث مغربي) script, formerly called Mashreqi (مشرقي) or Maghrebized Mashreqi (مشرقي متمغرب) a script inspired by the Mashreqi Thuluth script. It is mainly used as a decorative script for book titles and walls in mosques. It was used as an official script by the Almohads.
5. Musnad (مسند) script, or Z'mami (زمامي) script, a cursive script mainly used by courts and notaries in writing marriage contracts. This script is derived from Mujawher, and its letters in this script lean to the right. Because is difficult to read, this script was used to write texts that the author wanted to keep obscure, such as texts about sorcery.

In addition, Muhammad Bin Al-Qasim al-Qundusi, a 19th-century Sufi calligrapher based in Fes, developed a flamboyant style now known as Qandusi (قندوسي) script.

Among the publications of Octave Houdas, a 19th-century French orientalist, dealing with the subject of Maghrebi script, there are Essai sur l'Ecriture Maghrebine (1886) and Recueil de Lettres Arabes Manuscrites (1891). In 1886, he identified 4 main subscripts within the Maghrebi script family:

- Qairawani—"smooth and even"
- Andalusi—"small, compact, and jerky"
- Fasi—"large, round, and elegant"
- Sudani—"thicker and blacker"

=== West African Maghrebi scripts ===
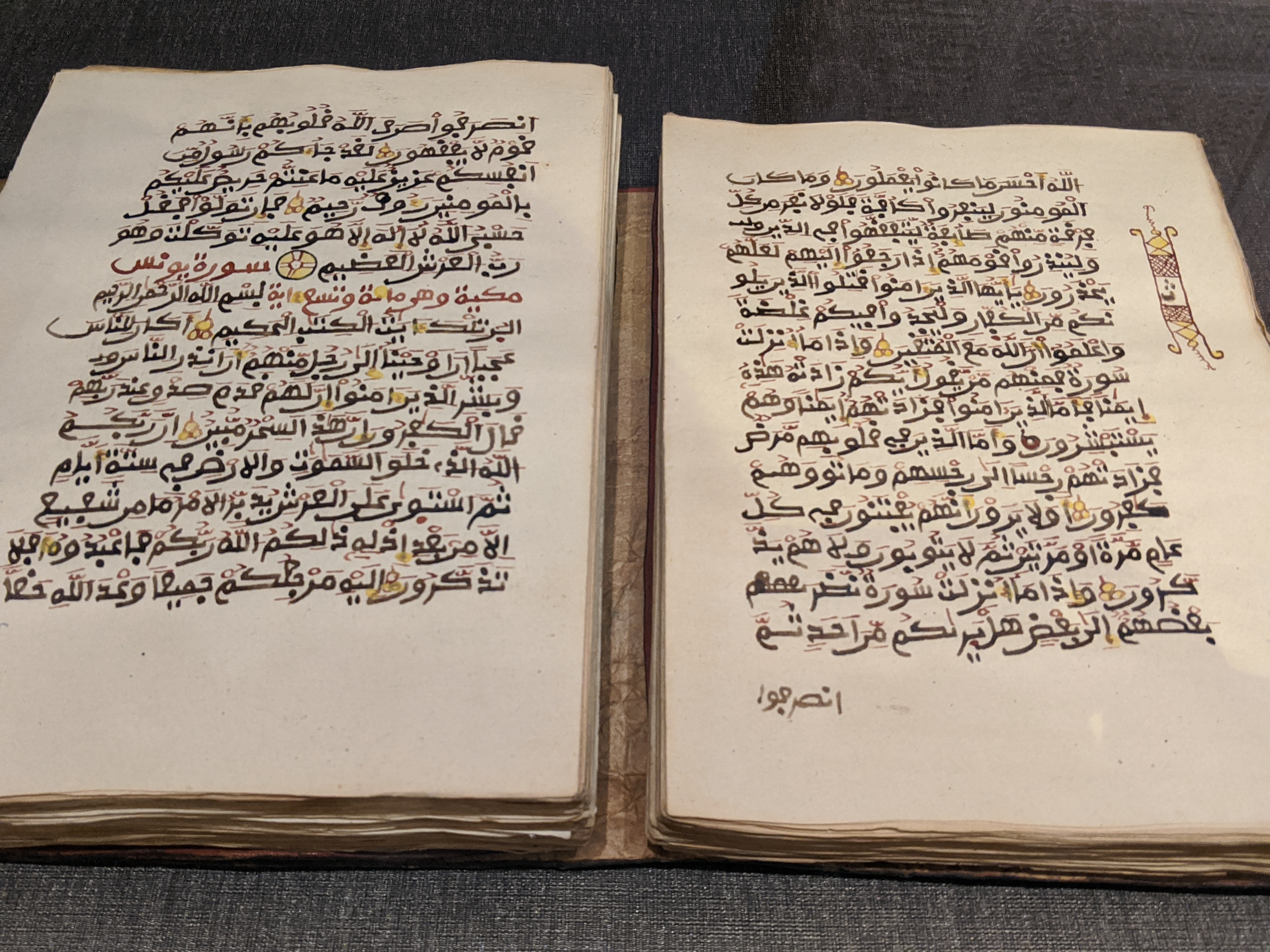
19th century Quran from northern Nigeria written in Kanawi-Barnawi style

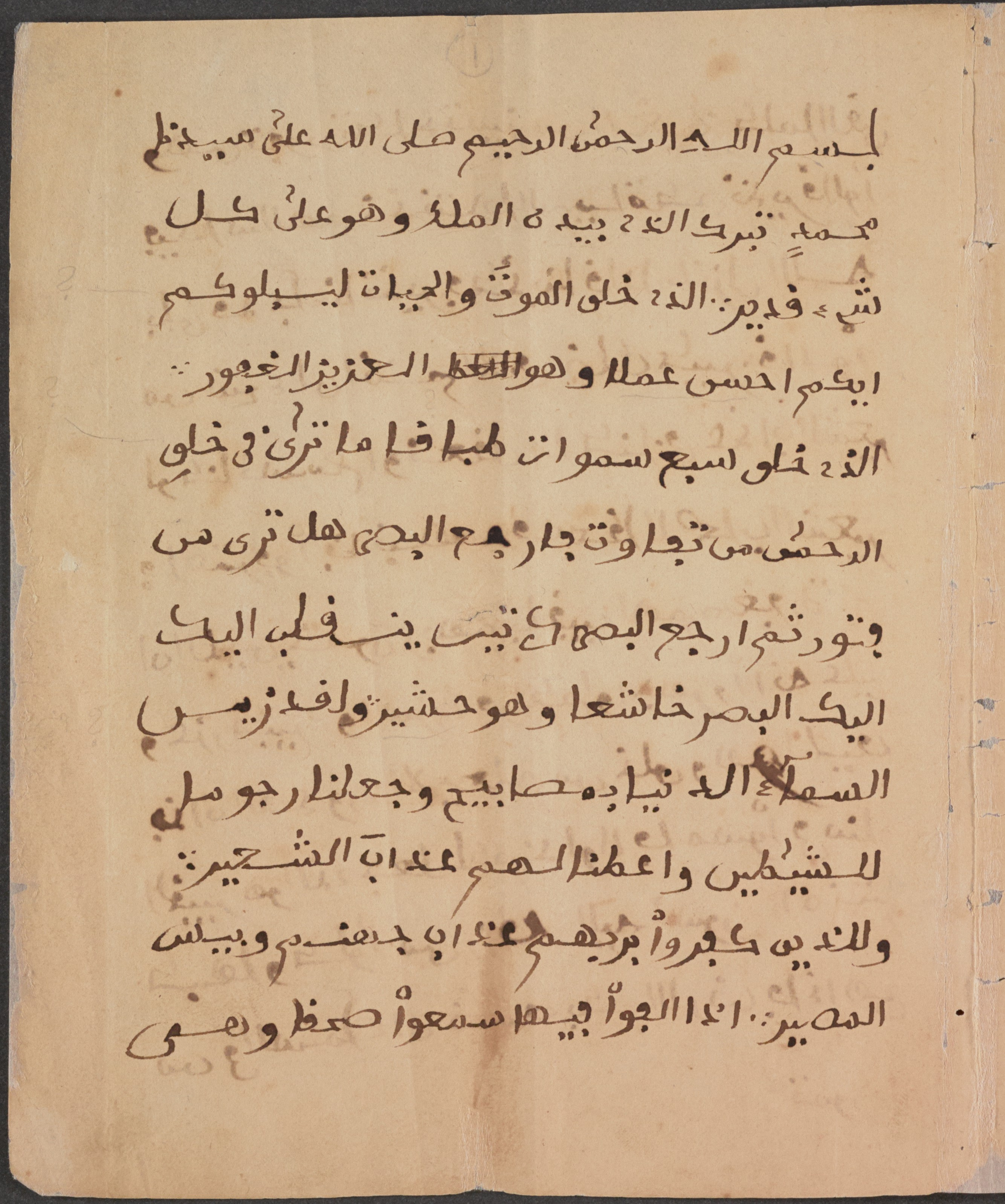
Surat Al-Mulk transcribed from memory in the United States in a rudimentary Fulani script by Omar ibn Said after he was captured and enslaved.

Various West African Arabic scripts, also called Sudani scripts (in reference to Bilad as-Sudan), also fall under the category of Maghrebi scripts, including:

- Suqi (سوقي) named after the town of Suq, though also used in Timbuktu. It is associated with the Tuareg people.
- Fulani (فولاني)
- Hausawi (هاوساوي)
- Mauretanian Baydani (بيضاني موريطاني)
- Kanemi (كنيمي) or Kanawi, is associated with the region of Kano in modern-day Chad and northern Nigeria, associated with Borno—also Barnawi script
- Saharan
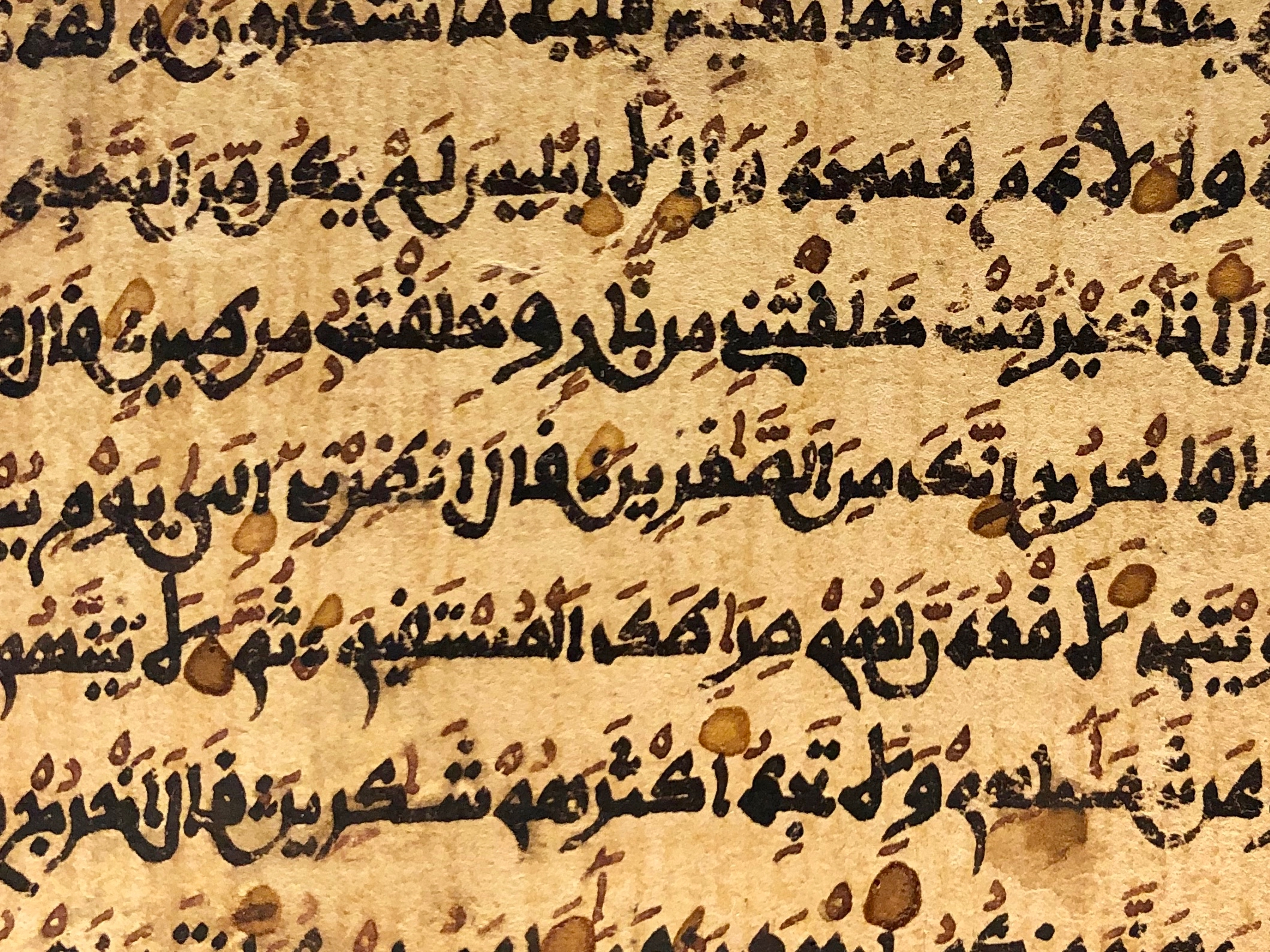
Suqi script

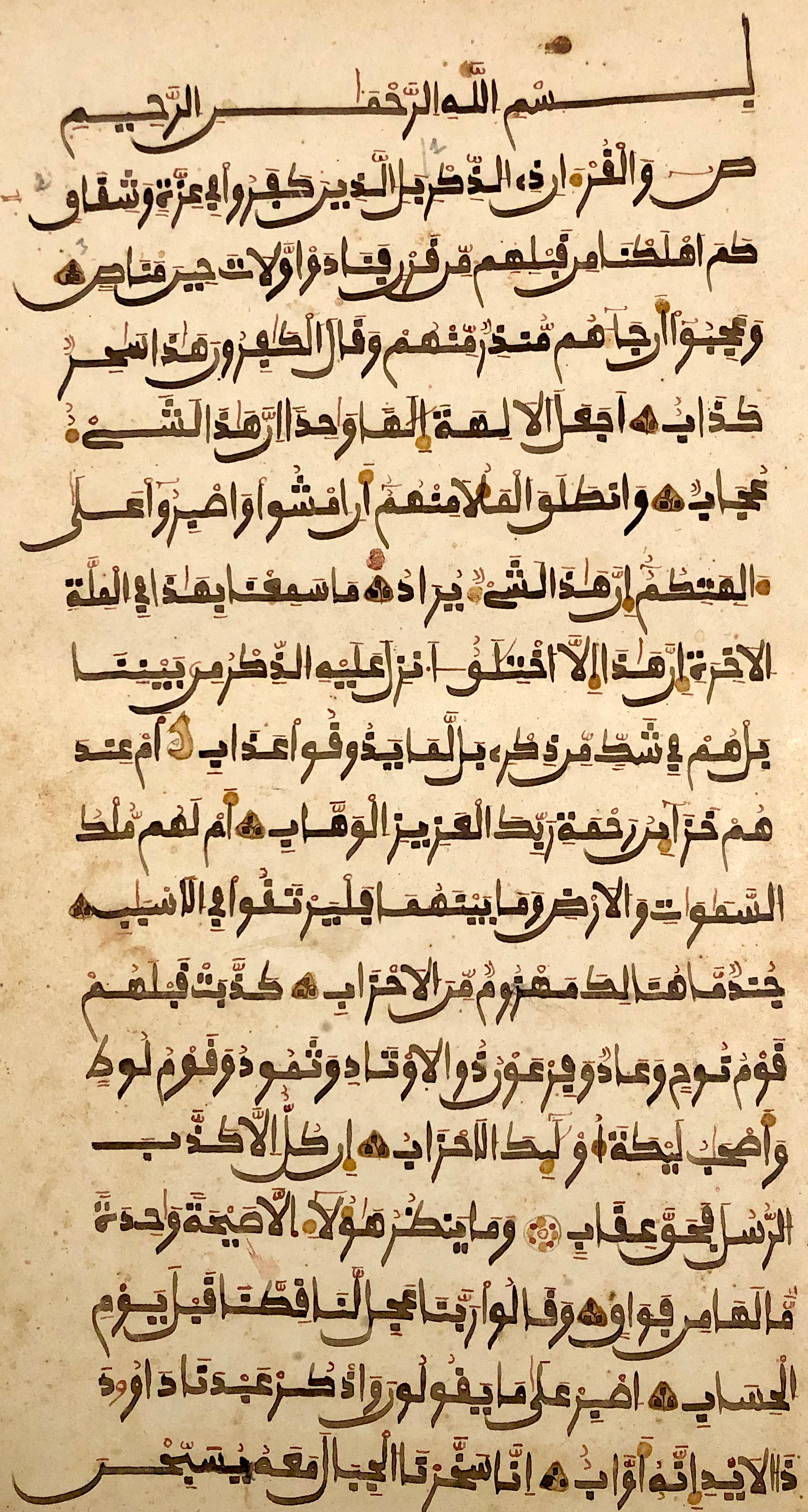
Fulani script

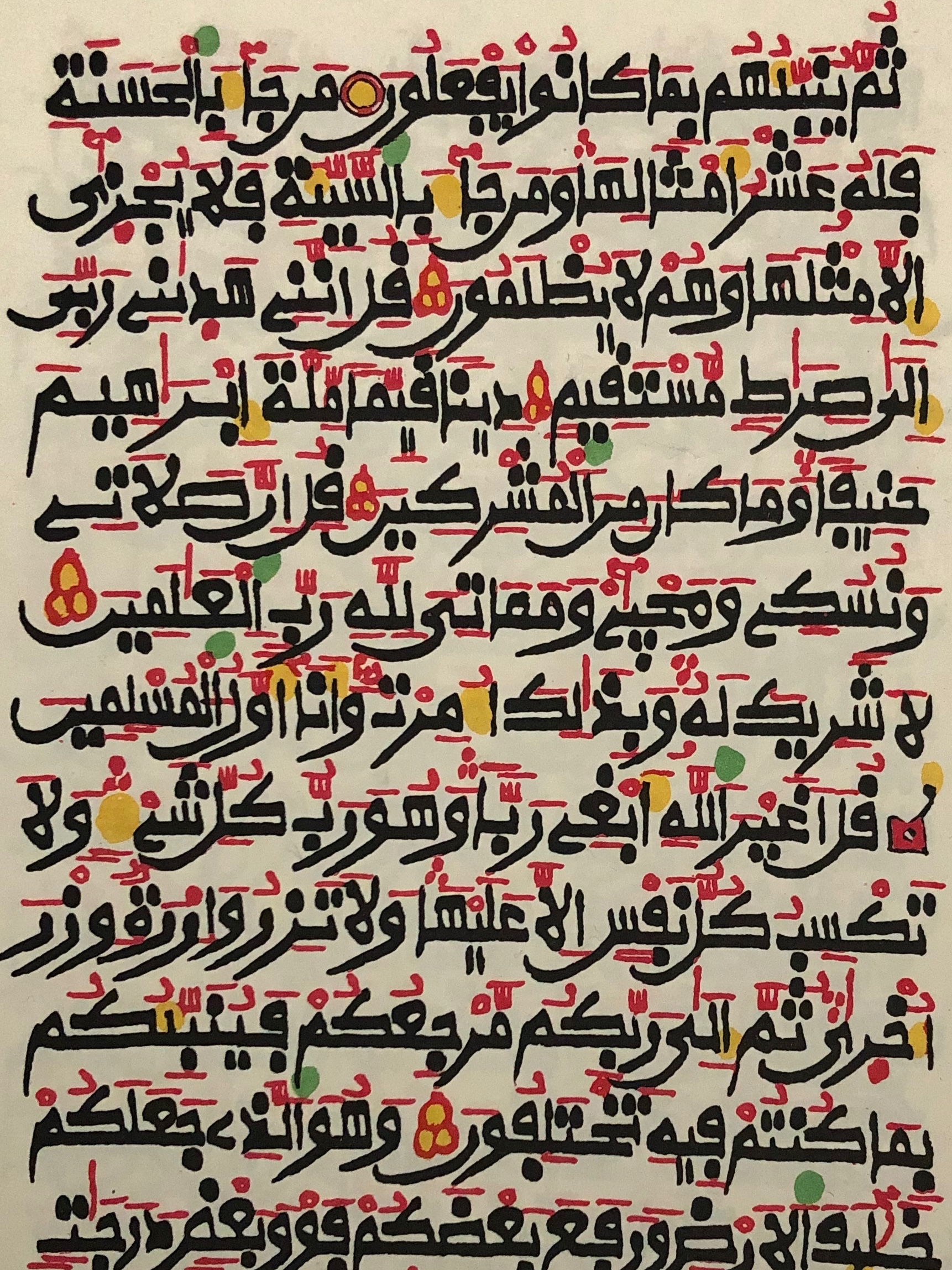
Hausawi script

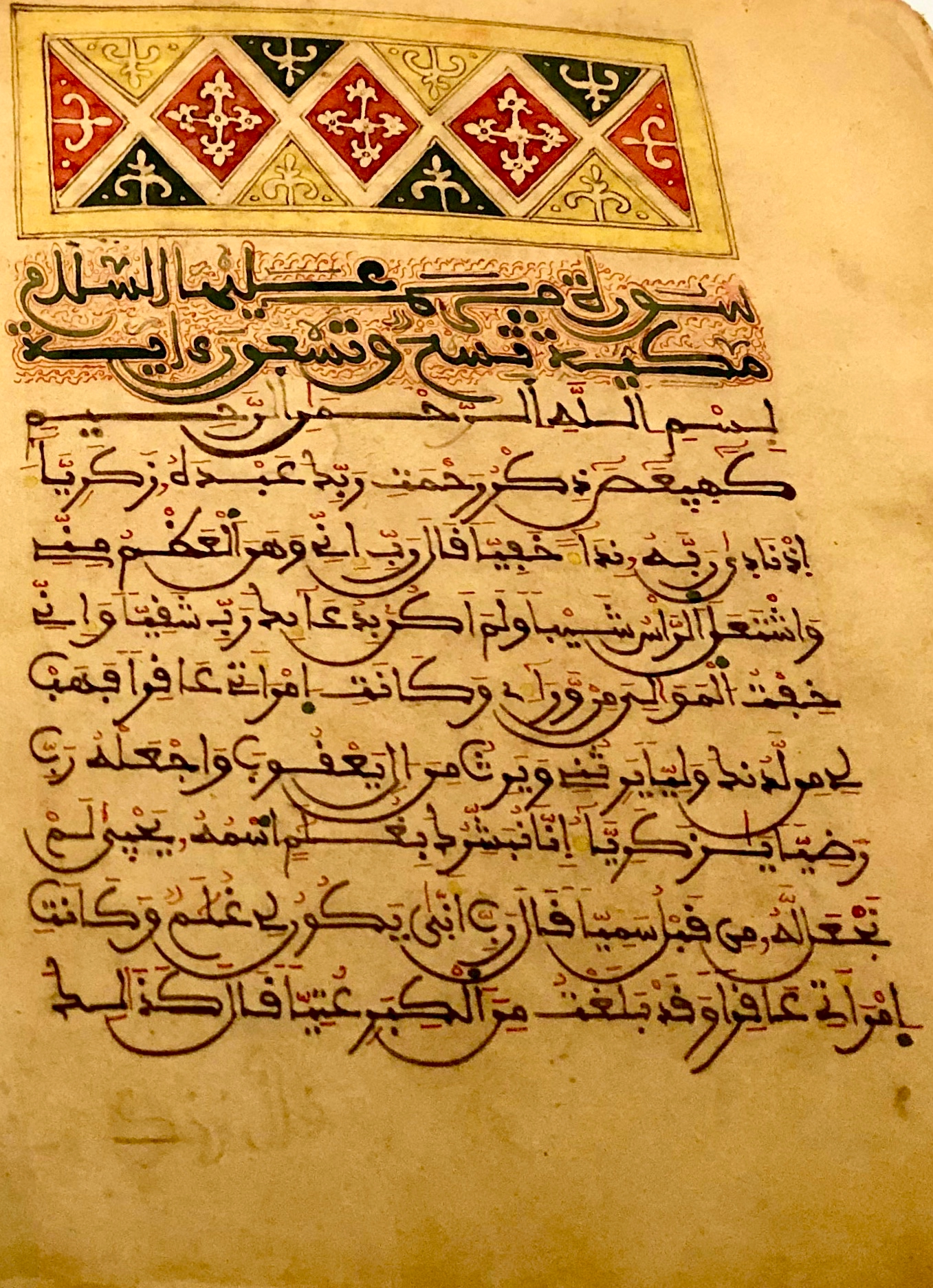
Baydani script

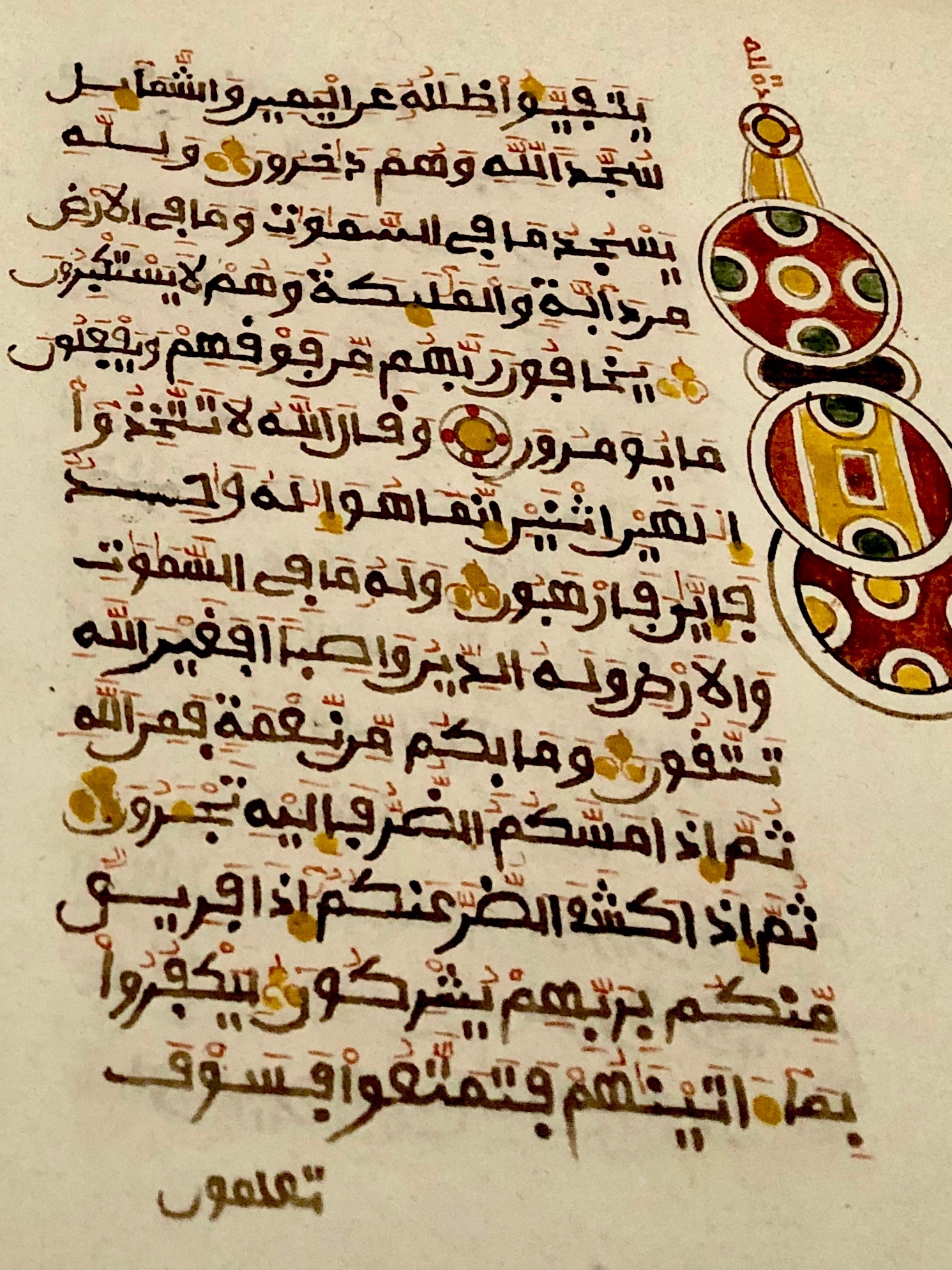
Kanemi script

== Contrast with Mashreqi scripts ==
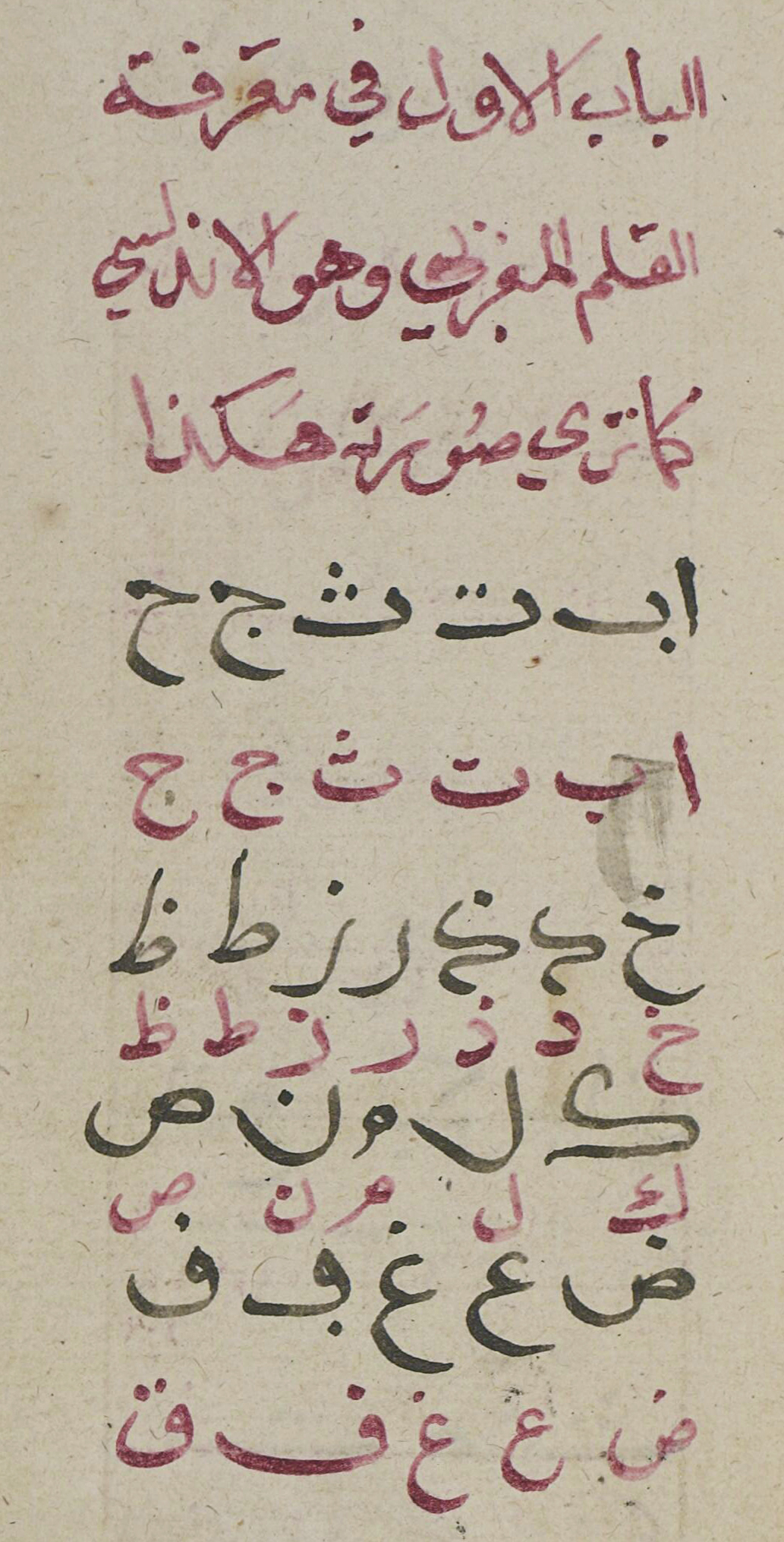
Maghrebi-Andalusi Arabic letterforms presented in a 1751 Ottoman copy of Shawq al-Mustaham.

One of the prominent ways Maghrebi scripts differ from scripts of the Arabic-speaking East is the dotting of the letters faa' (ف) and qoph (ق). In eastern tradition, the faa' is represented by a circle with a dot above, while in Maghrebi scripts the dot goes below the circle (ڢ). In eastern scripts, the qoph is represented by a circle with two dots above it, whereas the Maghrebi qoph is a circle with just one dot above (ڧ), similar to the eastern faa'. In fact, concerns over the preservation of Maghrebi writing traditions played a part in the reservations of the Moroccan ulama against importing the printing press.

Additionally, Nico van den Boogert notes that in Maghrebi script:

- the loop of Ṣād (ص) and Ḍād (ض)has no "tooth"
- the stems of alif (ا), lam (ل), lamalif (لا), Ṭāʾ (ط), and Ẓāʾ (ظ) are drawn with a knot at the end
- the stems of Ṭāʾ (ط), and Ẓāʾ (ظ) are drawn diagonally
- the final alif (ـا) is written top-to-bottom
- the final and isolated dāl (د) and dhāl (ذ) resemble initial and medial Kaph (كـ)

Additionally, Maghrebi scripts differ from Mashreqi scripts in that Maghrebi scripts are traditionally written with a pointed tip instead of a chisel tip. As a result, Maghrebi scripts typically have less contrast in line thickness than Mashreqi scripts, which have wider horizontal strokes and thinner vertical strokes.

== Gallery ==
Qurans in Maghrebi scripts

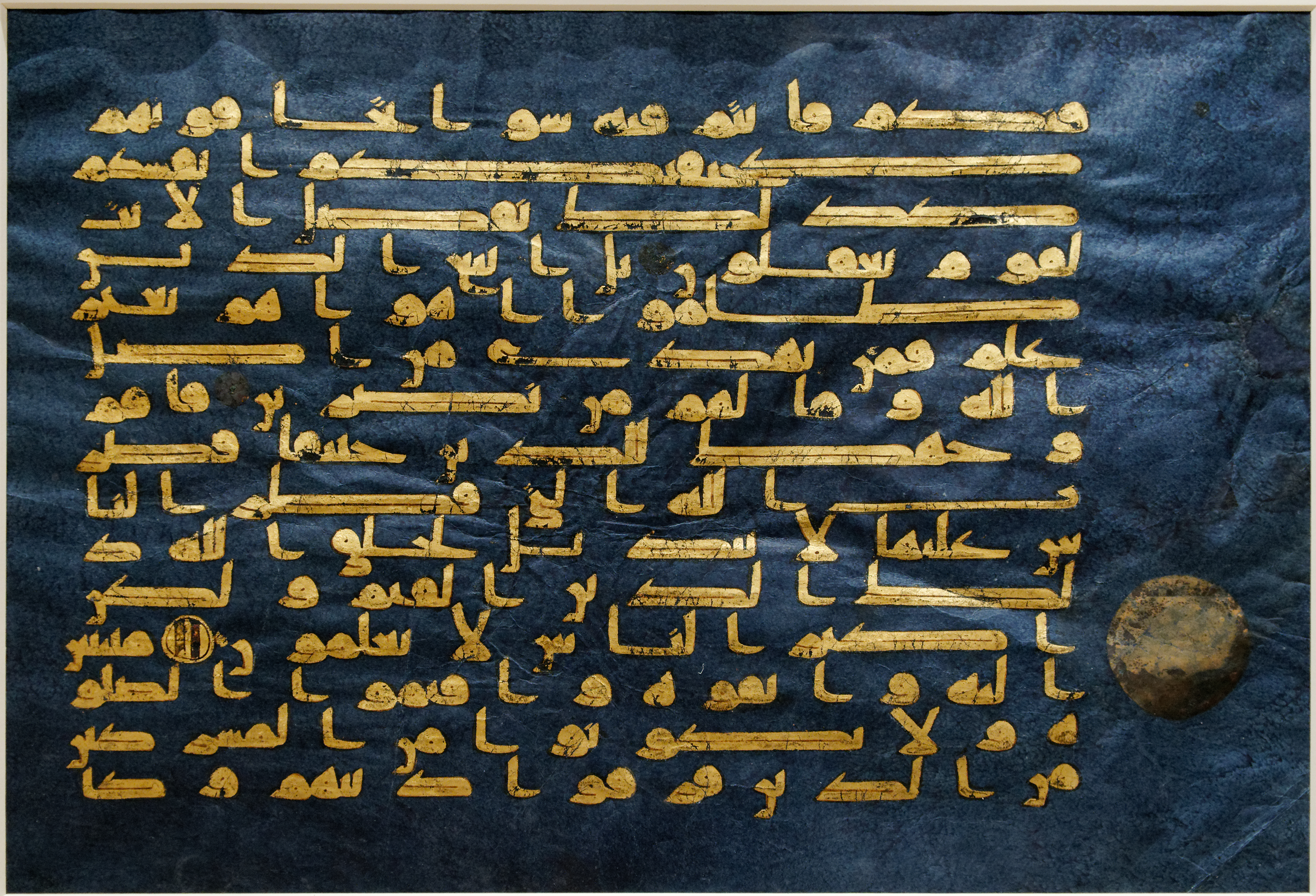
Blue Qur'an, 9th to early 10th-century, from either al-Andalus or Tunisia.

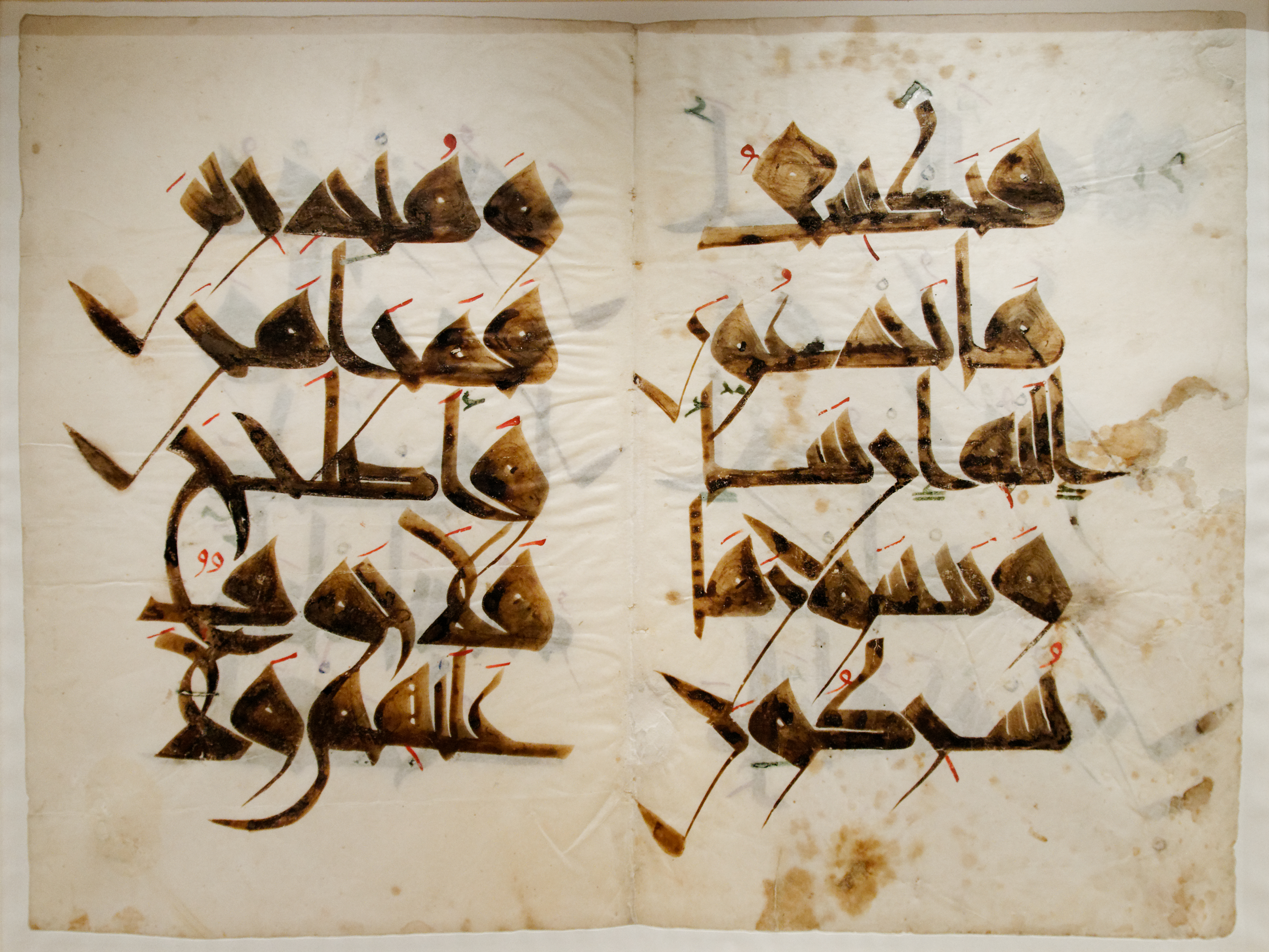
The Zirid "Nurse's Quran." Qairawan, early 11th century.

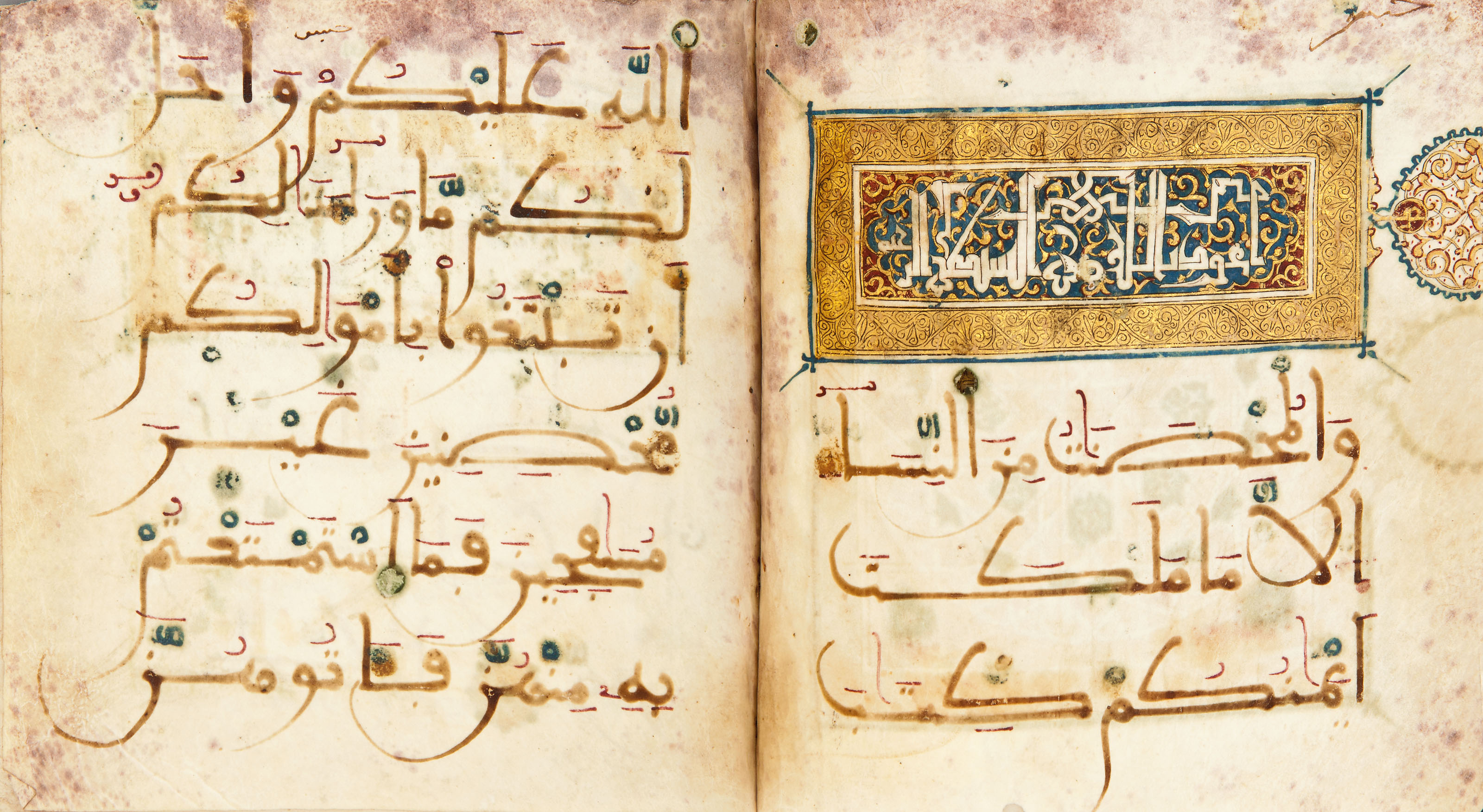
Almoravid-Almohad period

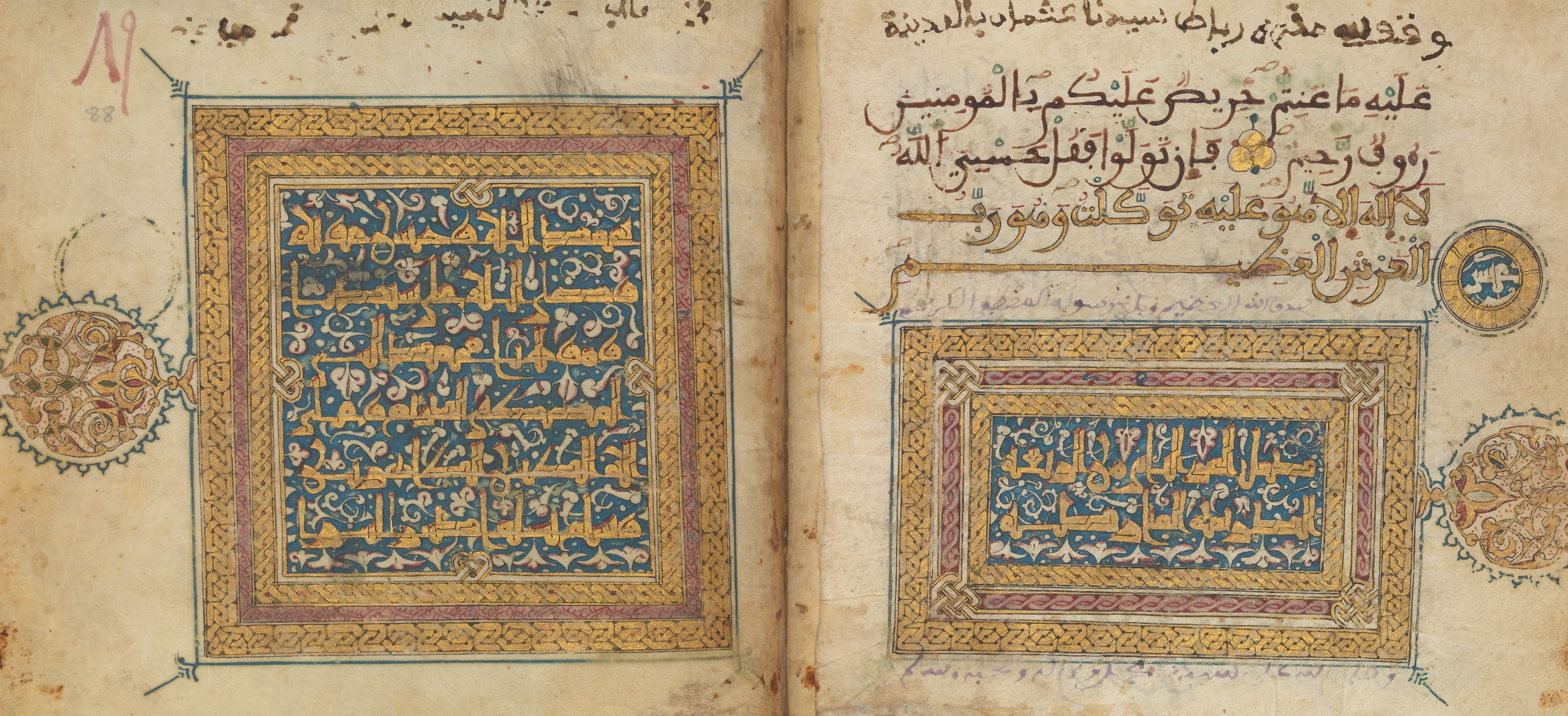
Moroccan Quran from around 1300.

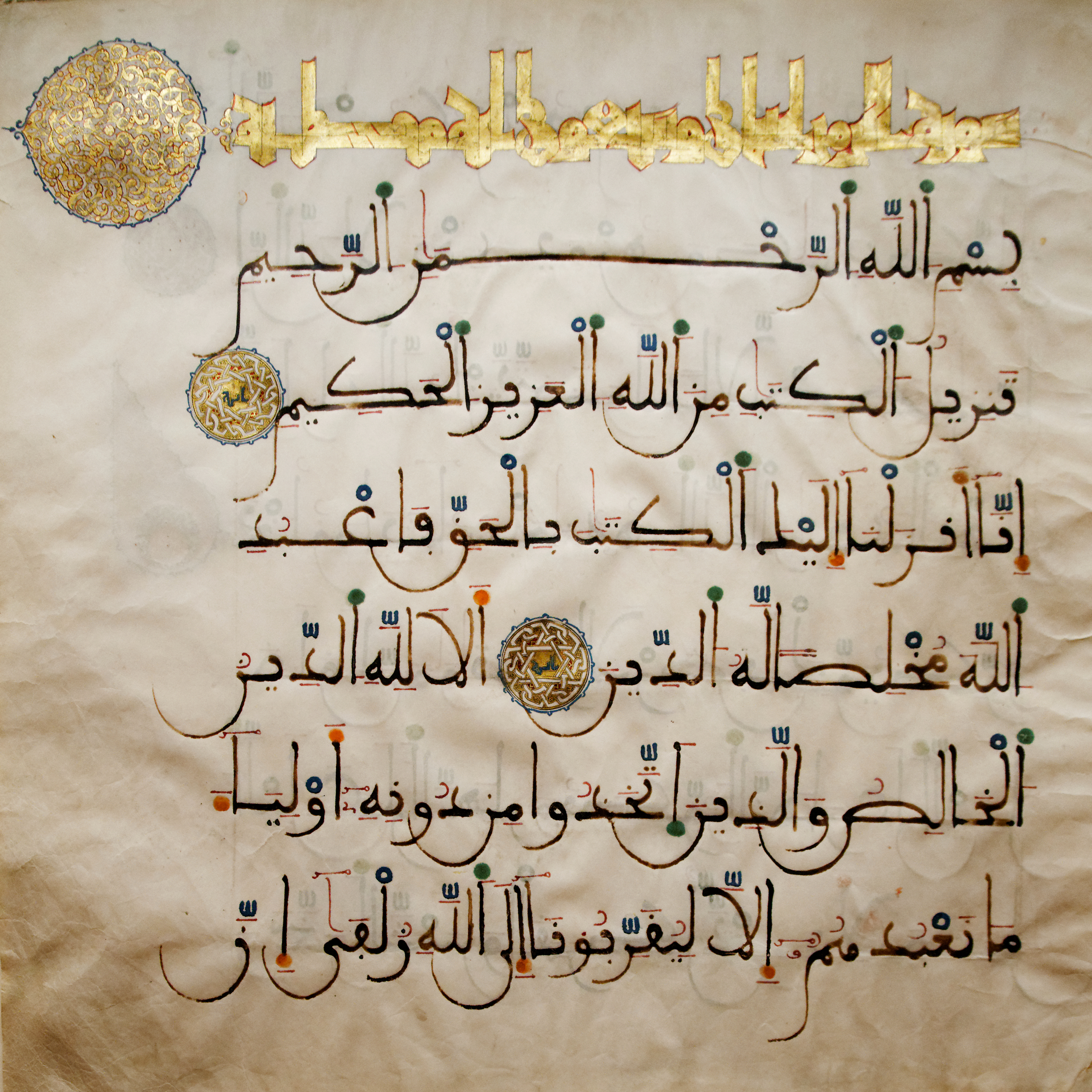
Andalusi Quran, late 13th–early 14th century.

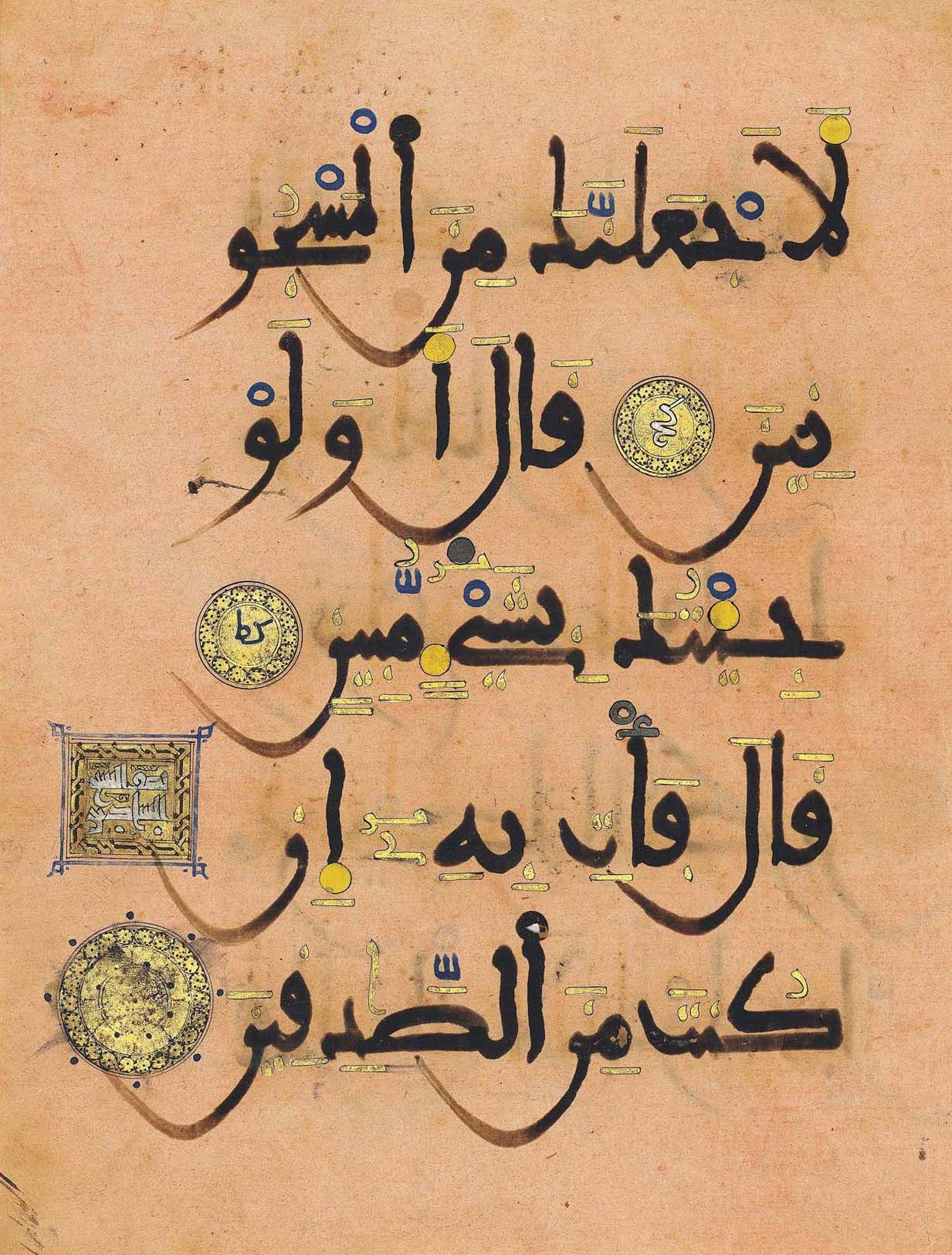
A page of the Pink Quran with illuminated diacritics. Al-Andalus 14th century.

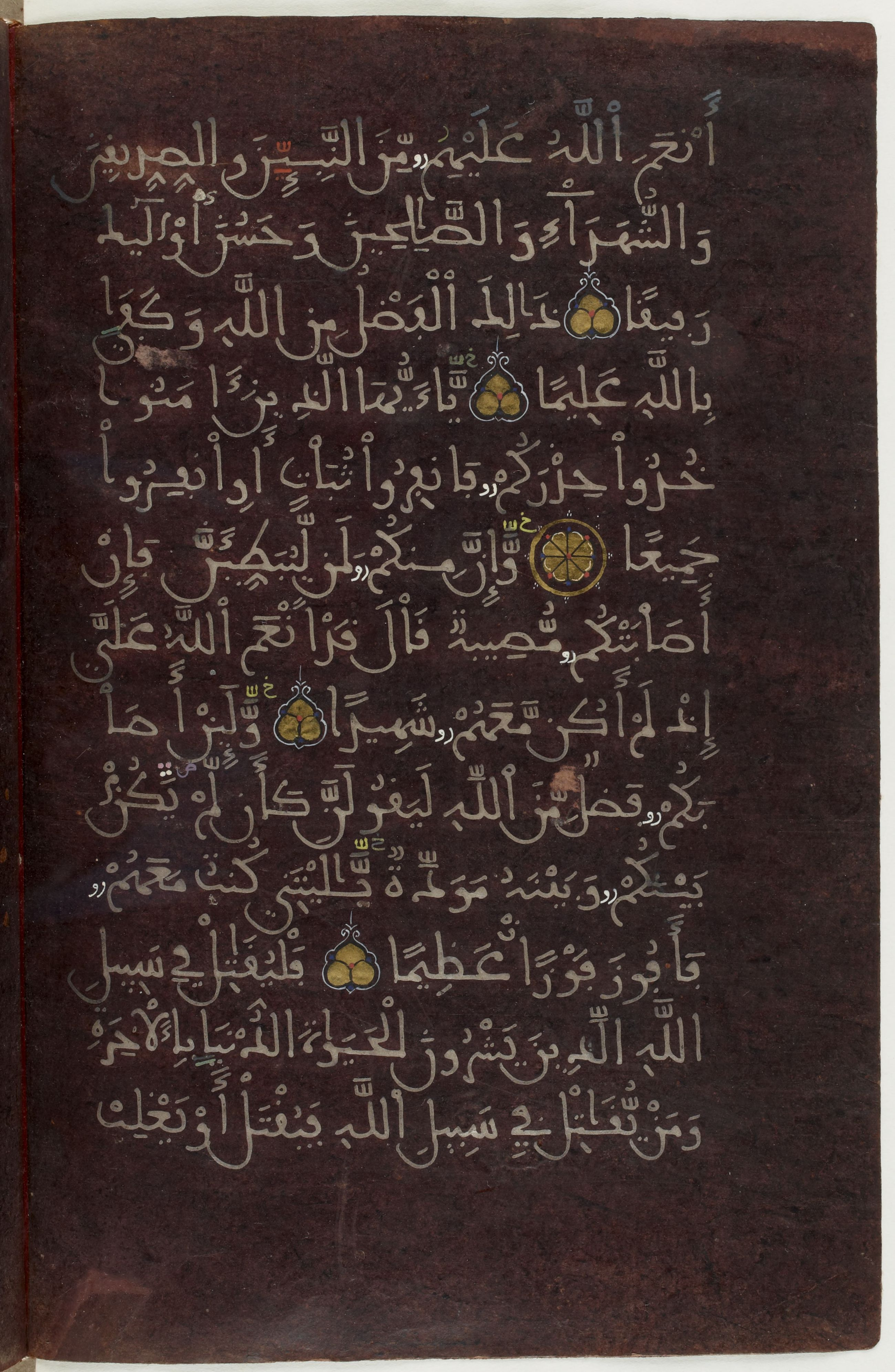
Hafsid Quran donated to the Kasbah Mosque by Caliph Abu Faris Abd al-Aziz II in 1405.

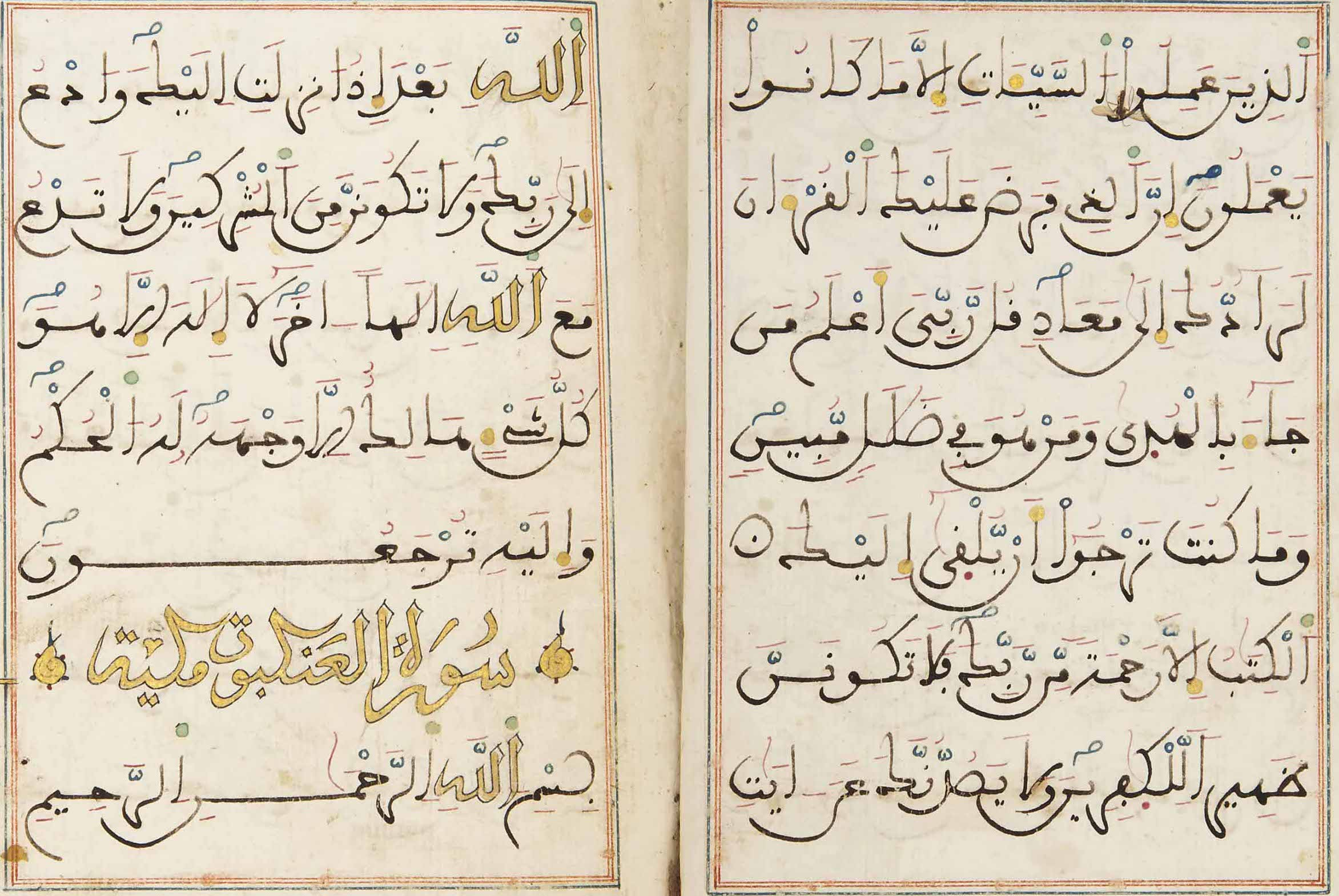
17th or 18th century Moroccan Quran

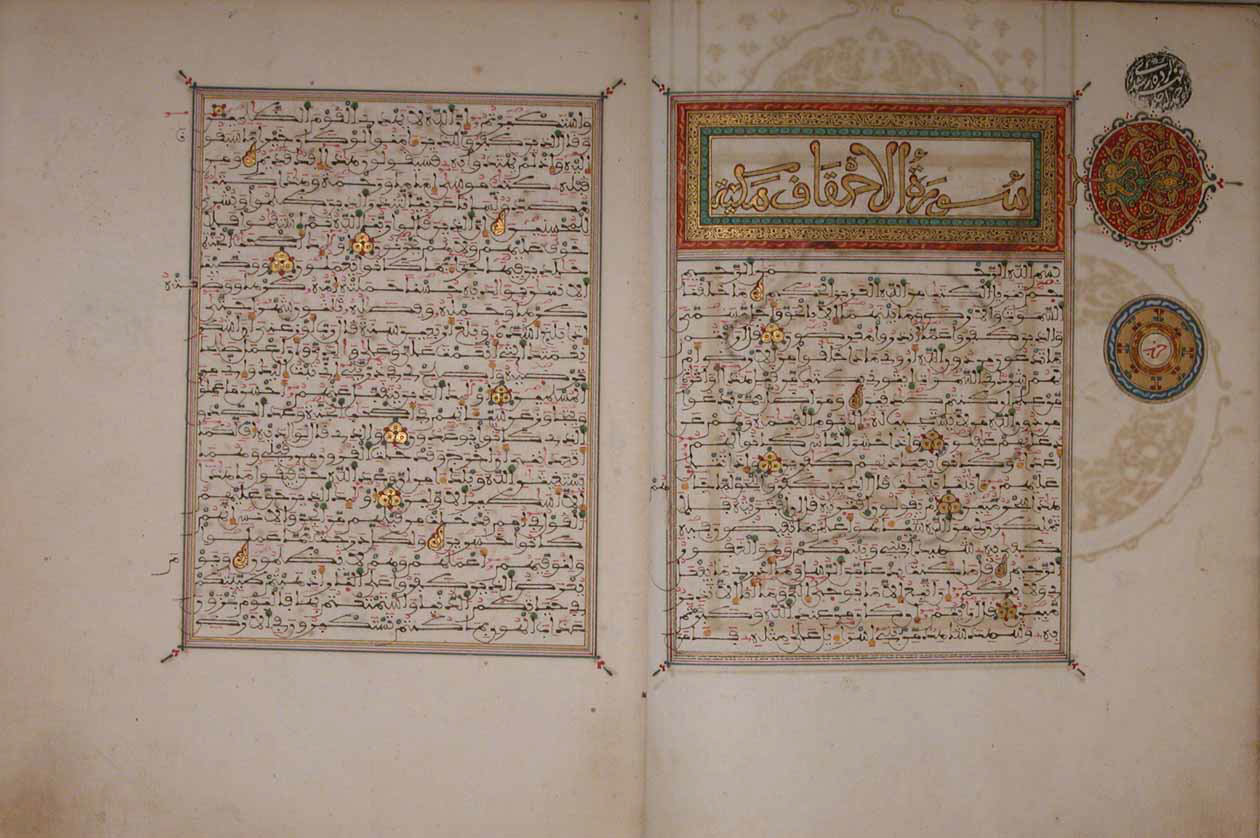
18th century Moroccan Quran.

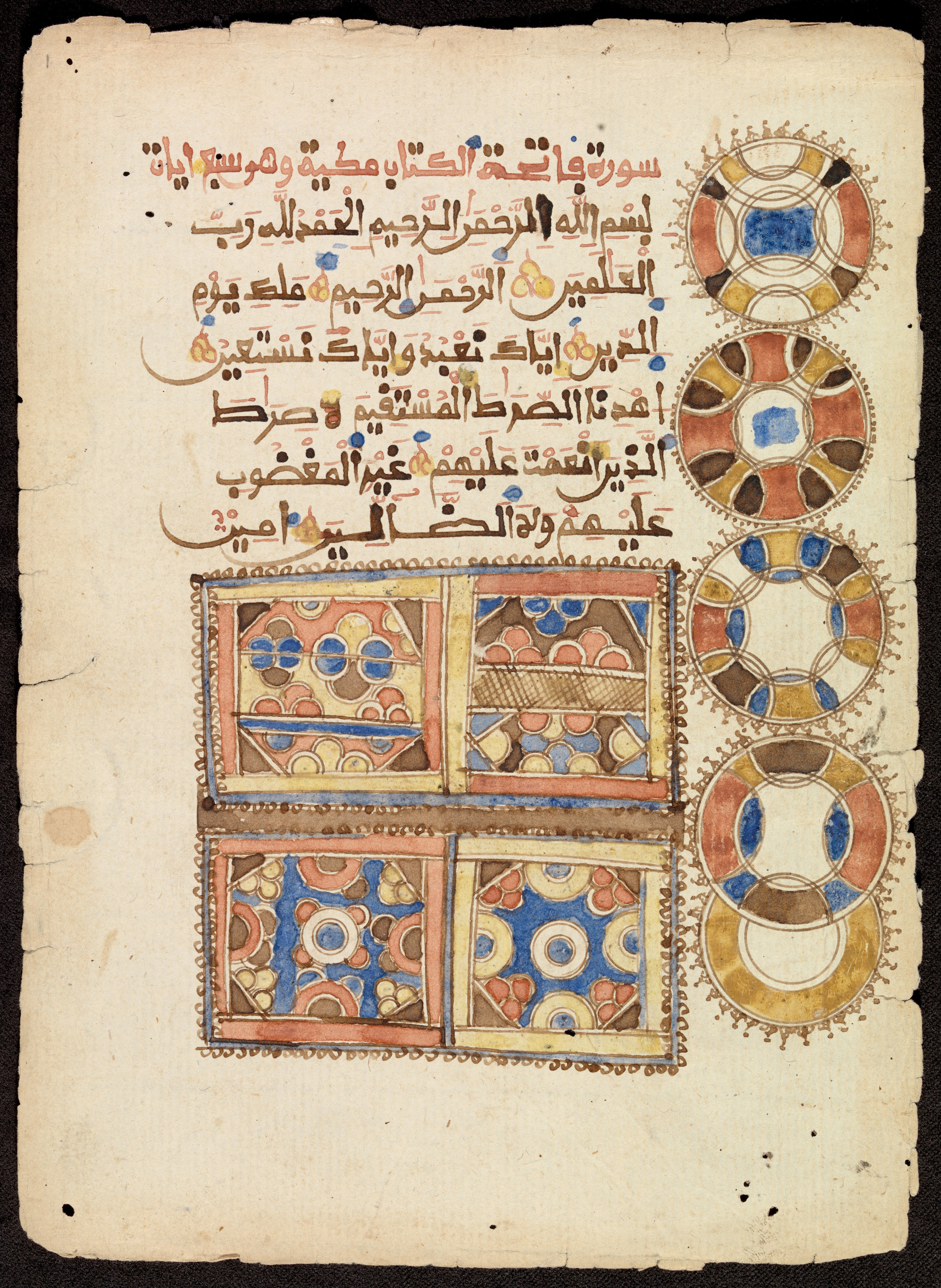
Al-Fatiha in the Sudani script. North-west Africa, 19th century. Chester Beatty Library

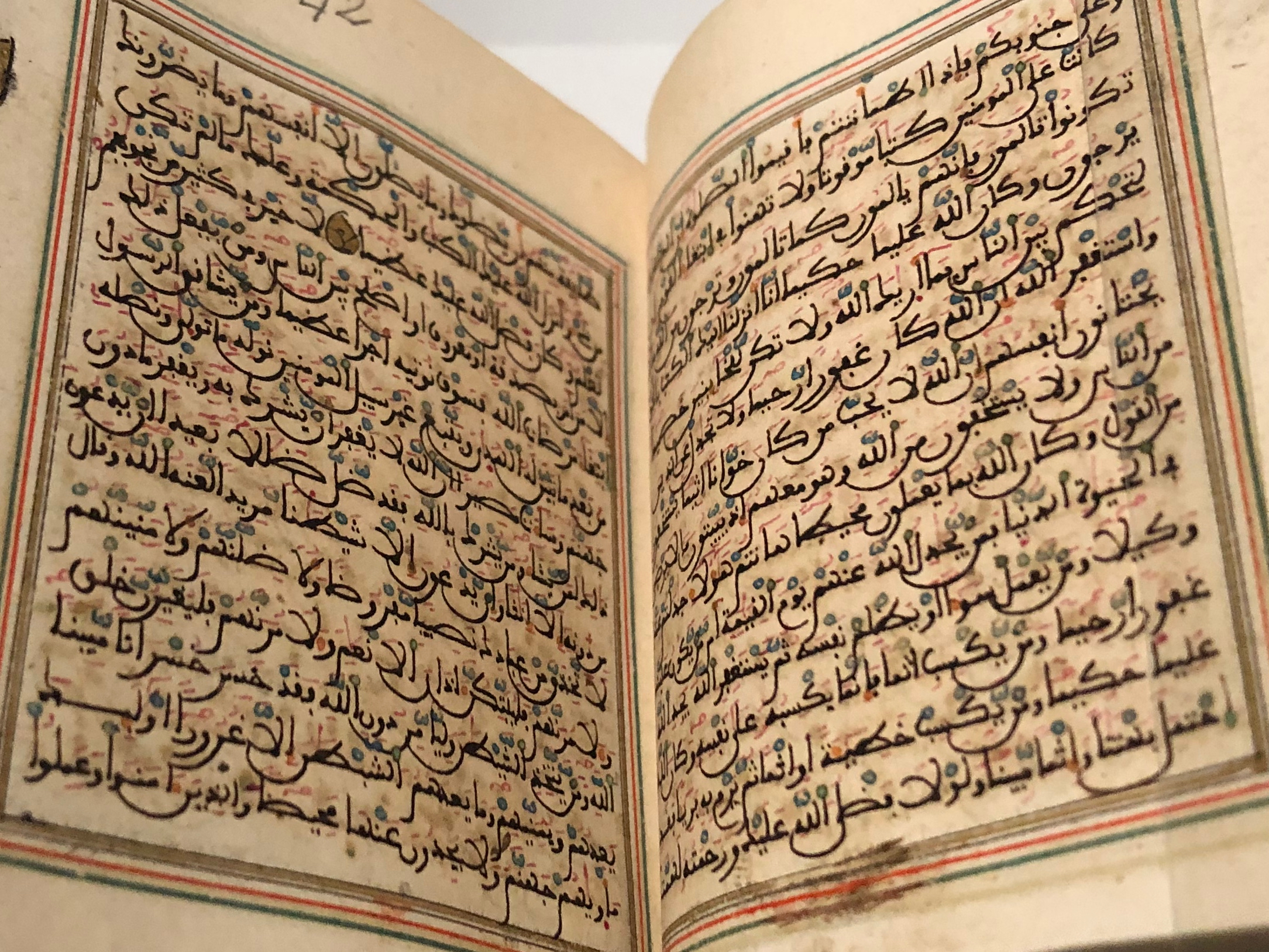
Quran in mabsūt script

== Typeface ==
Harmattan is a digital Saharan sub-variant typeface on Google Fonts.

== See also ==
- Rashi script
- Tifinagh
