= Zar =

Zar may refer to:

== Places ==
- Zar, Armenia
- Zar, Azerbaijan
- Žár, Czech Republic
- Zar, Iran, in Markazi Province
- Zeraq, or Zar, Hamadan Province, Iran
- Żar, Łódź Voivodeship, Poland
- Żar (mountain), in Poland
- Žar Mountain, a mountain range in Kosovo

== People ==
=== Surname ===
- Chet Zar (born 1967), American artist; son of James Zar
- Heather Zar (born ?), South African pediatrician, respiratory specialist, writer, and professor
- Ibn Abi Zar (died between 1310 and 1320), Moroccan historian and poet; presumed author of the medieval history of Morocco, Rawd al-Qirtas
- James Zar (1941–2015), American artist; father of Chet Zar
- Jerrold Zar (1941–2026), American biologist and academic
- Lwi Zar (born 1976), Burmese politician
- Mordechai Zar (1914–1982), Israeli politician
- Moshe Zar (1937–2025), Israeli religious Zionist, settlement leader, and convicted terrorist
- Paul Zar (born 1967), American bobsledder and Olympic competitor
- Pe Thein Zar (1943–2018), Burmese-born Australian student leader, lawyer, revolutionary and freedom fighter, and writer
- Rose Zar (1922–2001), Polish Holocaust survivor, human rights activist, and author
- Sarah Zar (born ?), American visual and performance artist, musician, songwriter, and writer

=== Given name ===
- Zar Ajam (1993/1994–2011), Pakistani terrorist
- Zar Wali Khan (1953–2020), Pakistani Islamic scholar
- Zar Gul Khan (fl. 2017), Pakistani politician
- Zar Lawrence (born 1982), New Zealand rugby player
- Zar Randeri (pen name of Bharucha Hasim bin Yusuf; 1887–?), Indian Gujarati poet and translator
- Zar Zar Myint (born 1993), Burmese footballer
- Zar Zari Zar Baksh (fl.c. AD 1400), Indian Sufi saint
- Zarsanga (or Zar Sanga, born 1946), Pakistani Pashto folk singer

== Other uses ==
- Zār, or Zaar, a demon or spirit in the Horn of Africa and adjacent regions of the Middle East
- Zar, a band featuring John Lawton
- Zar, a fictional land in "The White Ship" by H. P. Lovecraft
- South African Republic (Dutch: Zuid-Afrikaanse Republiek)
- Zar Points, a statistical method for evaluating hands in contract bridge
- Rincón Zapotec, a language of Mexico, ISO 639-3 code zar
- South African rand, the currency of South Africa, ISO 4217 code ZAR

== See also ==
- Zaar (disambiguation)
- Żar (disambiguation)
- Tsar (disambiguation)
- Zar und Zimmermann, a comic opera
