= Rijan, Markazi =

Village in Markazi province, Iran

Rijan Persian: ريجان
- Village
- Location within Iran
- Coordinates: 34°02′37″N 51°00′51″E
- Country: Iran
- Province: Markazi
- County: Delijan
- District: Central
- Rural District: Jushaq

Population (2016)
  - Total: 131
- Time zone: UTC+3:30 (IRST)

Rijan (Persian: ريجان) (Note: Also romanized as Rījān; also known as Reyḩān) is a village in Jushaq Rural District (Note: Formerly Mashhad Ardehal Rural District) of the Central District of Delijan County, Markazi province, Iran.

== Demographics ==
=== Population ===
At the time of the 2006 National Census, the village's population was 161 in 50 households. The following census in 2011 counted 173 people in 59 households. The 2016 census measured the population of the village as 131 people in 50 households.
