= Kerukan =

Kerukan (Persian: كروكان) may refer to:

- Kerukan, Hormozgan
- Kerukan, Markazi
