= Darb-e Juqa =

Village in Markazi province, Iran

Darb-e Juqa Persian: درب جوقا
- Village
- Location within Iran
- Coordinates: 33°54′09″N 50°57′51″E
- Country: Iran
- Province: Markazi
- County: Delijan
- District: Central
- Rural District: Hastijan

Population (2016)
  - Total: 117
- Time zone: UTC+3:30 (IRST)

Darb-e Juqa (Persian: درب جوقا) (Note: Also romanized as Darb Jūqā and Darb-e Jūqā; also known as Darb-i Jugha and Darijoogha) is a village in Hastijan Rural District of the Central District in Delijan County, Markazi province, Iran.

== Demographics ==
=== Population ===
At the time of the 2006 National Census, the village's population was 139 in 43 households. The following census in 2011 counted 146 people in 47 households. The 2016 census measured the population of the village as 117 people in 47 households.
