= Qalhar =

Village in Markazi province, Iran

Qalhar Persian: قالهر
- Village
- Location within Iran
- Coordinates: 33°53′31″N 50°59′53″E
- Country: Iran
- Province: Markazi
- County: Delijan
- District: Central
- Rural District: Hastijan

Population (2016)
  - Total: 618
- Time zone: UTC+3:30 (IRST)

Qalhar (Persian: قالهر) (Note: Also romanized as Qālhar; also known as Ghalhar, Golhar, Gulehār, and Kūlhār) is a village in Hastijan Rural District of the Central District in Delijan County, Markazi province, Iran.

== Demographics ==
=== Population ===
At the time of the 2006 National Census, the village's population was 894 in 290 households. The following census in 2011 counted 740 people in 250 households. The 2016 census measured the population of the village as 618 people in 229 households, the most populous village in its rural district.
