= Chenarestan, Delijan =

Village in Markazi province, Iran

Chenarestan Persian: چنارستان
- Village
- Location within Iran
- Coordinates: 34°08′39″N 50°38′03″E
- Country: Iran
- Province: Markazi
- County: Delijan
- District: Central
- Rural District: Do Dehak

Population (2016)
  - Total: 107
- Time zone: UTC+3:30 (IRST)

Chenarestan (Persian: چنارستان) (Note: Also romanized as Chenārestān) is a village in Do Dehak Rural District of the Central District in Delijan County, Markazi province, Iran.

== Demographics ==
=== Population ===
At the time of the 2006 National Census, the village's population was 116 in 41 households. The following census in 2011 counted 87 people in 32 households. The 2016 census measured the population of the village as 107 people in 40 households.
