= Sineqan =

Village in Markazi province, Iran

Sineqan Persian: سينقان
- Village
- Location within Iran
- Coordinates: 33°57′36″N 50°55′57″E
- Country: Iran
- Province: Markazi
- County: Delijan
- District: Central
- Rural District: Hastijan

Population (2016)
  - Total: 180
- Time zone: UTC+3:30 (IRST)

Sineqan (Persian: سينقان) (Note: Also romanized as Sīneqān; also known as Sināghūn, Sīnehqān, and Singhan) is a village in Hastijan Rural District of the Central District in Delijan County, Markazi province, Iran.

== Demographics ==
=== Population ===
At the time of the 2006 National Census, the village's population was 298 in 136 households. The following census in 2011 counted 59 people in 24 households. The 2016 census measured the population of the village as 180 people in 86 households.
