= Delijan =

City in Markazi province, Iran

Delijan Persian: دليجان
- City
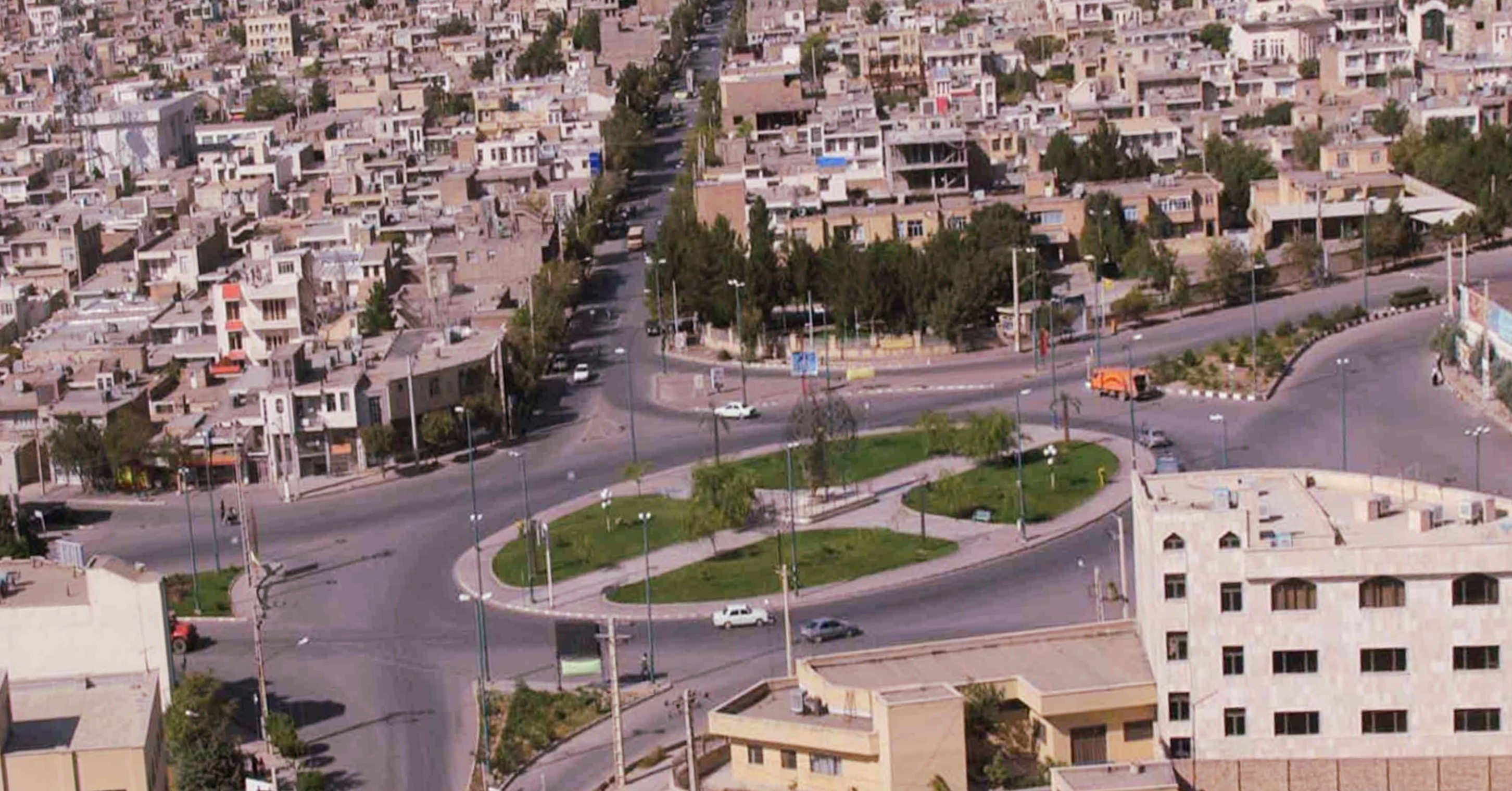
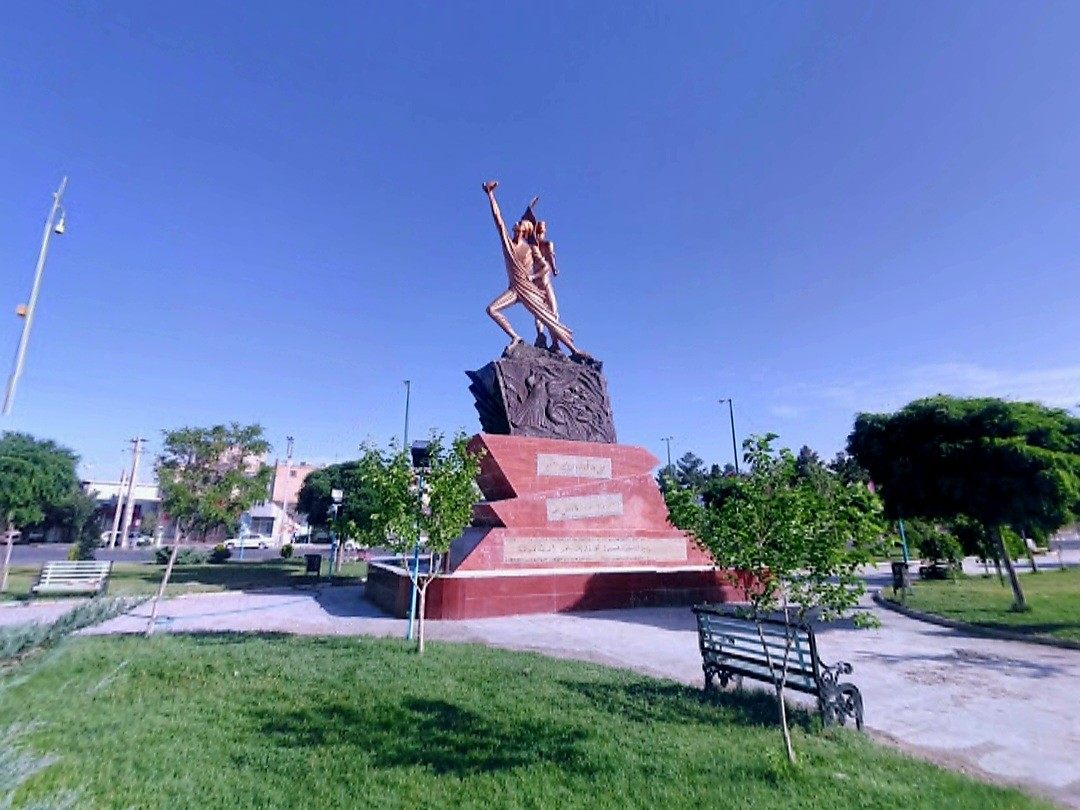
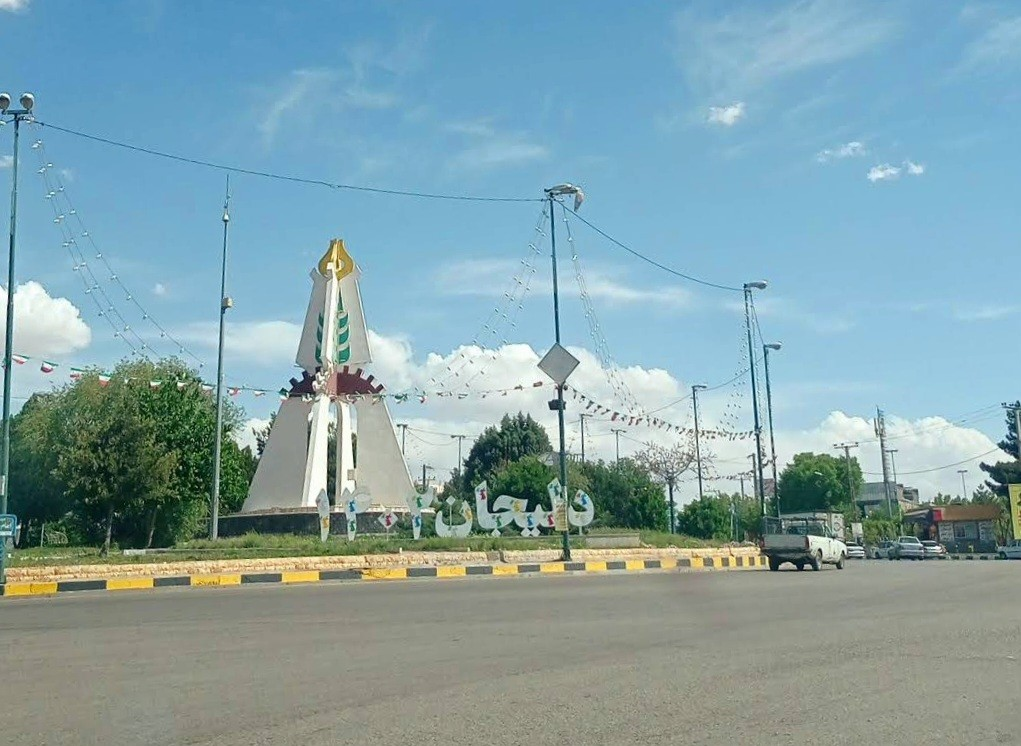
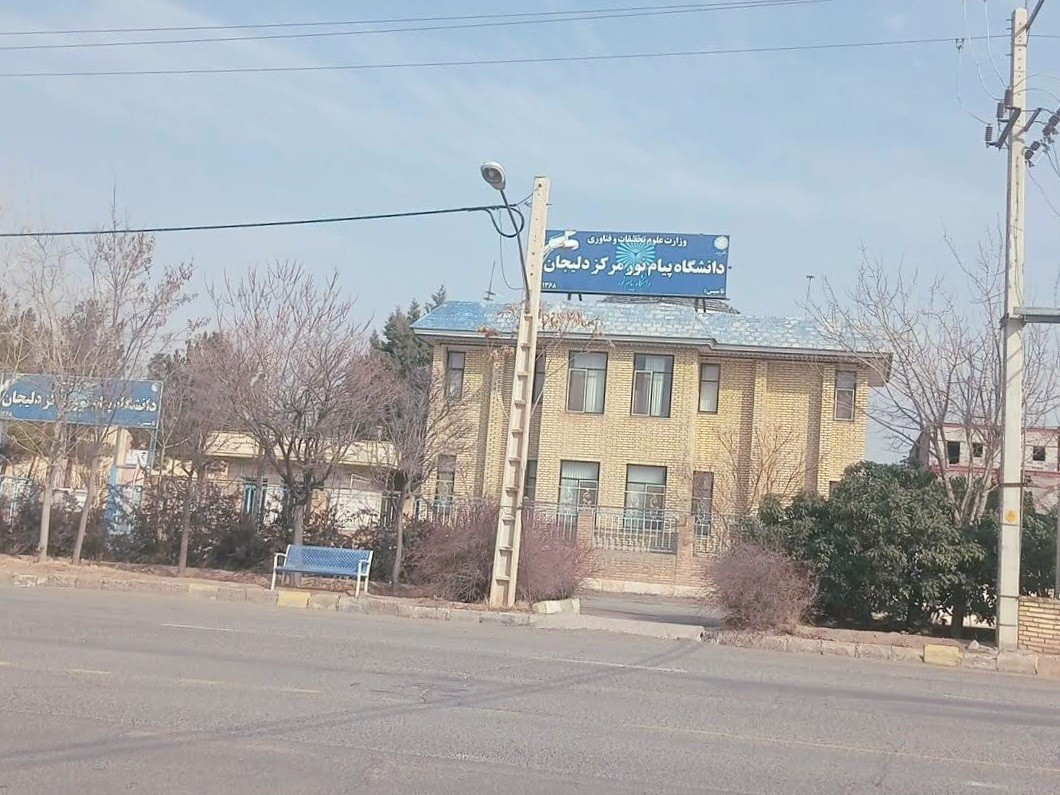
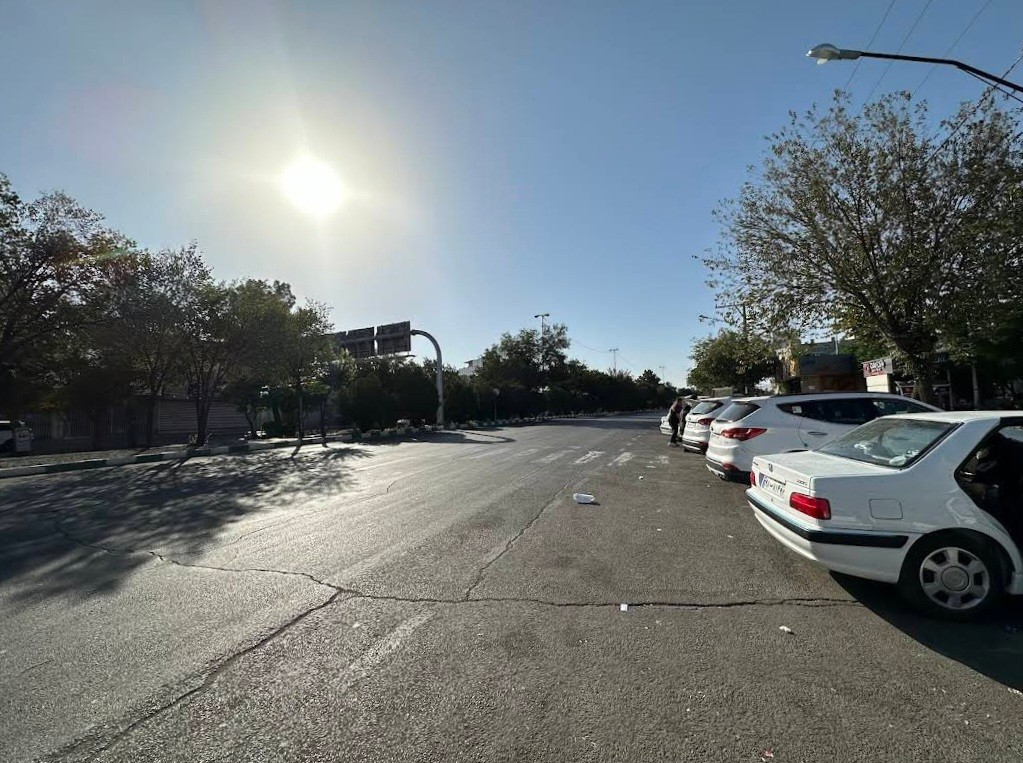
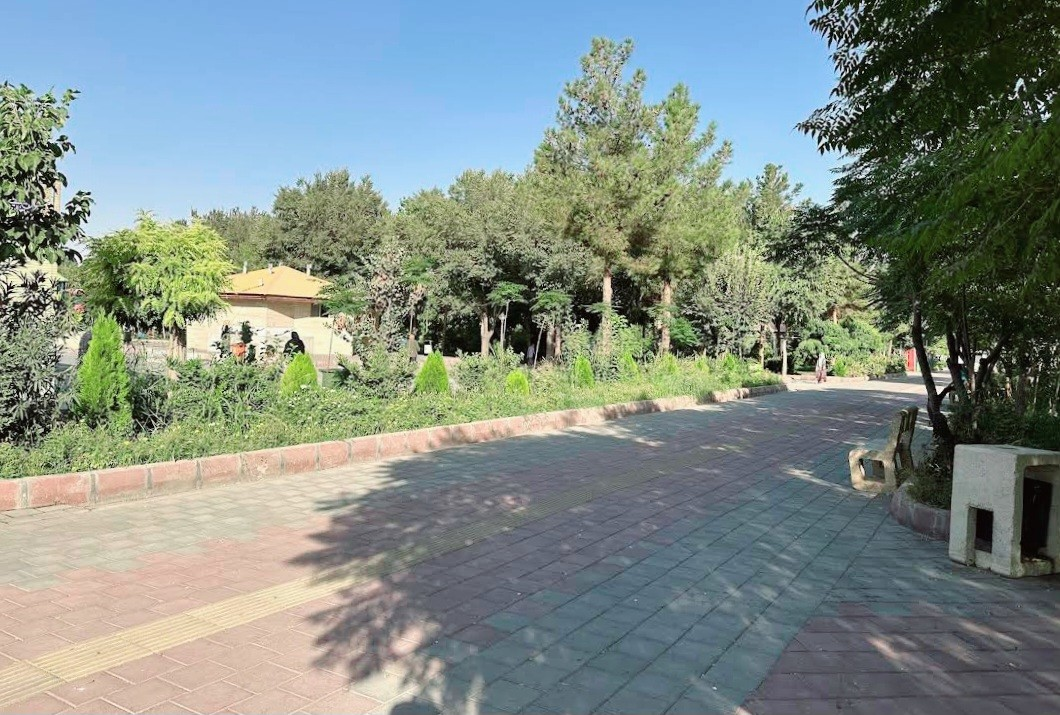
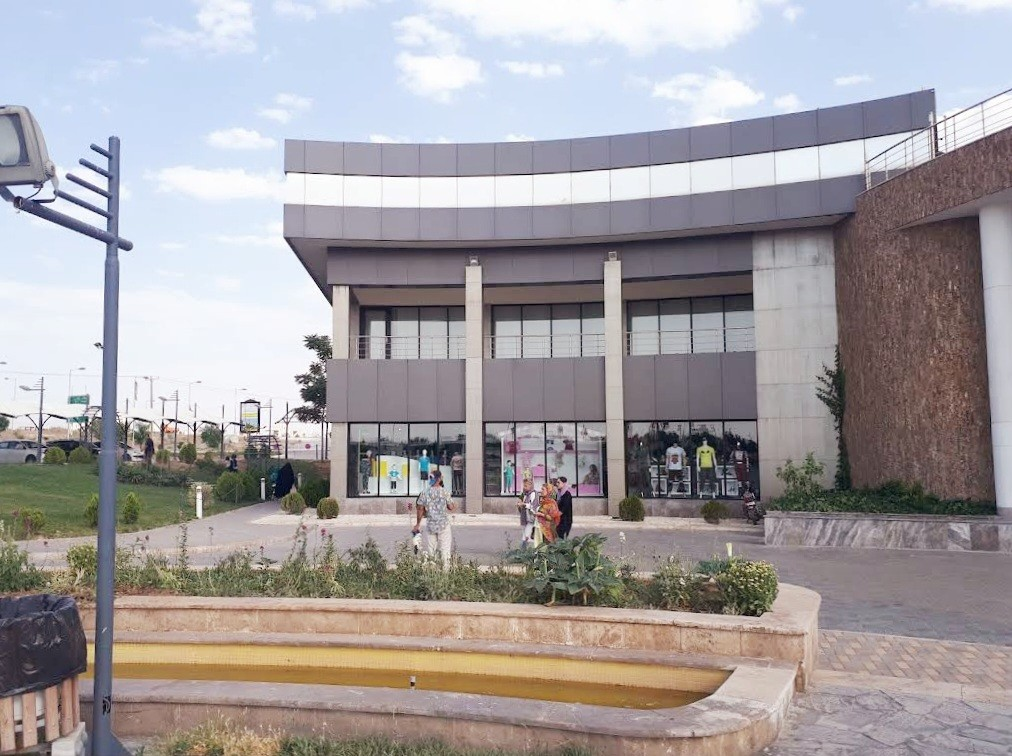
- View of the city in 2000s

- Location within Iran
- Coordinates: 33°59′25″N 50°41′01″E
- Country: Iran
- Province: Markazi
- County: Delijan
- District: Central

Population (2016)
  - Total: 40,902
- Time zone: UTC+3:30 (IRST)
- Area code: 086
- Website: www.edelijan.com

Delijan (Persian: دليجان) (Note: Also romanized as Dalijān and Delījān; also known as Dilījān) is a city in the Central District of Delijan County, Markazi province, Iran, serving as capital of both the county and the district. Delijan is 80 km (50 mi) from Qom and 160 km (100 mi) from Isfahan. The city is twinned with Dilijan, Armenia.

== Demographics ==
=== Language ===
The native population of Delijan speaks a dialect they call Delijani (or Diligoni in the native language). The native language of Delijan seems to be a version of the old-Persian language, which is similar to the language spoken in Abyaneh one of the oldest Persian village located about an hour away from Delijan.

=== Population ===
At the time of the 2006 National Census, the city's population was 31,852 in 8,779 households. The following census in 2011 counted 37,470 people in 11,031 households. The 2016 census measured the population of the city as 40,902 people in 12,612 households.

== Overview ==
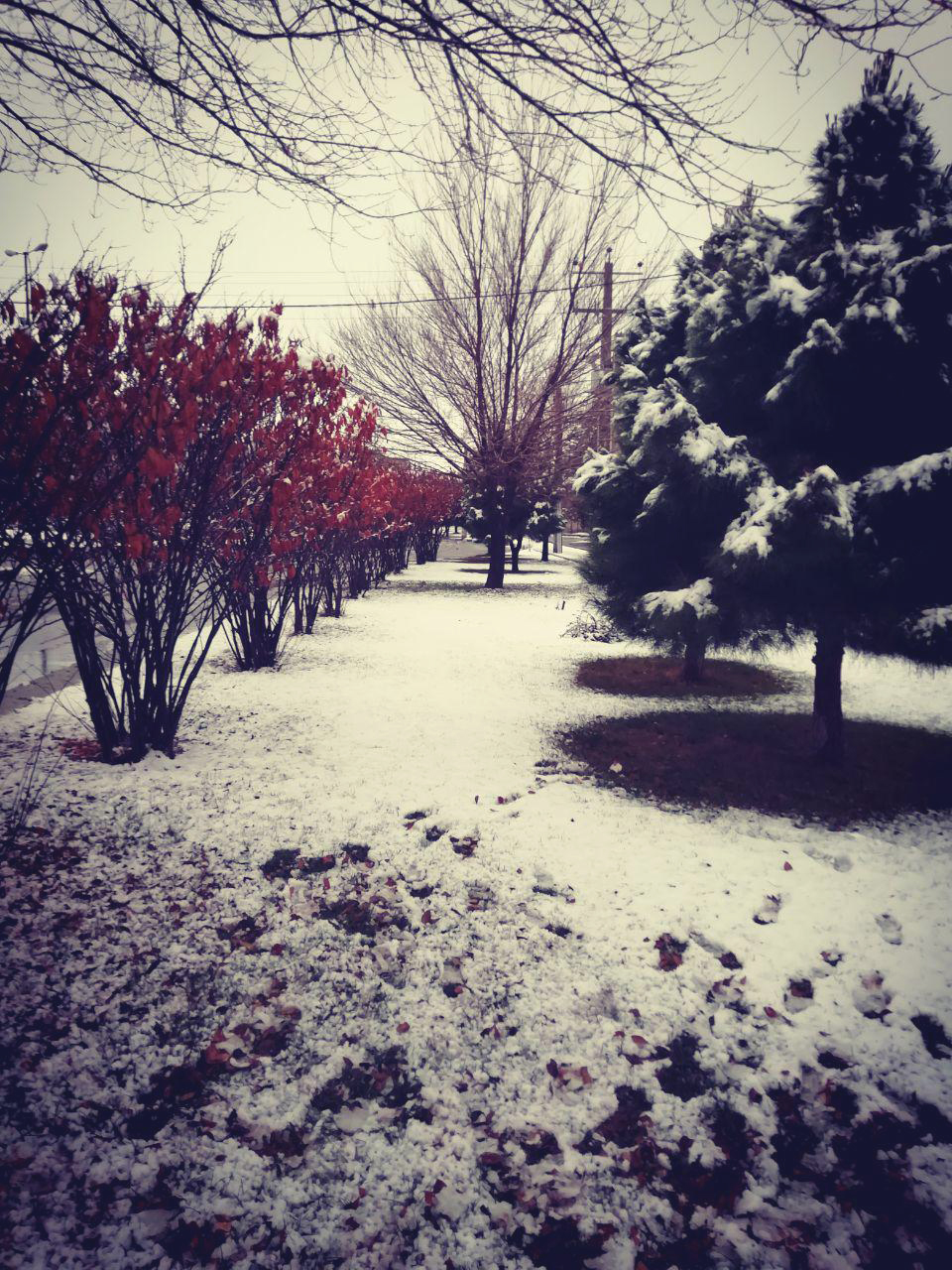
Chamran Square

Sites of interest include the 15th Khordad dam and Chal Nakhjir cave as well as its hot spring resort.

Delijan is an industrial city and is home to several popular carpet companies like the Mahestan, Setareh Talaii and Said companies. Also home of several companies producing a type of roof isolation called "Isogam". The area northeast of Delijan is populated by seven villages, this area is referred to as Jasb Rural District. Moreover, Chal-nakhjir Cave or Delijan Cave is one of the natural touristic attractions of Delijan.
