= Gorgan, Markazi =

Village in Markazi province, Iran

Gorgan Persian: گرگان
- Village
- Location within Iran
- Coordinates: 34°06′48″N 50°39′59″E
- Country: Iran
- Province: Markazi
- County: Delijan
- District: Central
- Rural District: Do Dehak

Population (2016)
  - Total: 27
- Time zone: UTC+3:30 (IRST)

Gorgan (Persian: گرگان) (Note: Also romanized as Gorgān) is a village in Do Dehak Rural District of the Central District in Delijan County, Markazi province, Iran.

== Demographics ==
=== Population ===
At the time of the 2006 National Census, the village's population was 13 in seven households. The following census in 2011 counted 16 people in five households. The 2016 census measured the population of the village as 27 people in 10 households.
