= Do Zia =

Village in Markazi province, Iran

Do Zia Persian: دوزيا
- Village
- Location within Iran
- Coordinates: 33°56′46″N 50°56′29″E
- Country: Iran
- Province: Markazi
- County: Delijan
- District: Central
- Rural District: Hastijan

Population (2016)
  - Total: 9
- Time zone: UTC+3:30 (IRST)

Do Zia (Persian: دوزيا) (Note: Also romanized as Do Zīā and Dow Zīā; also known as Dowzpā) is a village in Hastijan Rural District of the Central District in Delijan County, Markazi province, Iran.

== Demographics ==
=== Population ===
At the time of the 2006 National Census, the village's population was 20 in seven households. The following census in 2011 counted 13 people in five households. The 2016 census measured the population of the village as nine people in five households.
