= Varan, Iran =

Village in Markazi province, Iran

Varan Persian: واران
- Village
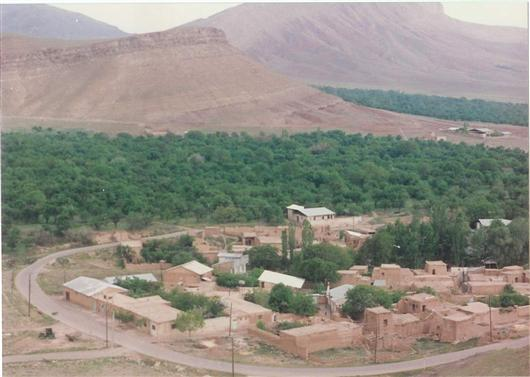
- The village of Varan as seen from the mountains

- Location within Iran
- Coordinates: 34°08′13″N 50°49′48″E
- Country: Iran
- Province: Markazi
- County: Delijan
- District: Central
- Rural District: Jasb

Population (2016)
  - Total: 415
- Time zone: UTC+3:30 (IRST)

Varan (Persian: واران) (Note: Also romanized as Varān and Vārān; also known as Wārūn) is a village in Jasb Rural District of the Central District in Delijan County, Markazi province, Iran.

== Demographics ==
=== Population ===
At the time of the 2006 National Census, the village's population was 257 in 114 households. The following census in 2011 counted 206 people in 89 households. The 2016 census measured the population of the village as 415 people in 153 households, the most populous in its rural district.
