= Laran, Iran =

Village in Markazi province, Iran

Laran Persian: لاران
- Village
- Location within Iran
- Coordinates: 34°02′35″N 51°01′35″E
- Country: Iran
- Province: Markazi
- County: Delijan
- District: Central
- Rural District: Jushaq

Population (2016)
  - Total: 143
- Time zone: UTC+3:30 (IRST)

Laran (Persian: لاران) (Note: Also romanized as Lārān) is a village in Jushaq Rural District (Note: Formerly Mashhad Ardehal Rural District) of the Central District of Delijan County, Markazi province, Iran.

== Demographics ==
=== Population ===
At the time of the 2006 National Census, the village's population was 188 in 58 households. The following census in 2011 counted 231 people in 76 households. The 2016 census measured the population of the village as 143 people in 53 households.
