= Do Dehak =

Village in Markazi province, Iran

Do Dehak Persian: دودهك
- Village
- Location within Iran
- Coordinates: 34°08′19″N 50°34′20″E
- Country: Iran
- Province: Markazi
- County: Delijan
- District: Central
- Rural District: Do Dehak

Population (2016)
  - Total: 947
- Time zone: UTC+3:30 (IRST)

Do Dehak (Persian: دودهك) (Note: Also romanized as Dow Dehak, Dūdehak, and Dūdhak) is a village in, and the capital of, Do Dehak Rural District in the Central District of Delijan County, Markazi province, Iran.

== Demographics ==
=== Population ===
At the time of the 2006 National Census, the village's population was 849 in 237 households. The following census in 2011 counted 922 people in 275 households. The 2016 census measured the population of the village as 947 people in 304 households.
