= Bahar, Markazi =

Village in Markazi province, Iran

Bahar Persian: بهار
- Village
- Location within Iran
- Coordinates: 34°00′56″N 51°02′47″E
- Country: Iran
- Province: Markazi
- County: Delijan
- District: Central
- Rural District: Jushaq

Population (2016)
  - Total: 144
- Time zone: UTC+3:30 (IRST)

Bahar (Persian: بهار) (Note: Also romanized as Bahār; formerly known as Karma (کارما)) is a village in Jushaq Rural District (Note: Formerly Mashhad Ardehal Rural District) of the Central District of Delijan County, Markazi province, Iran.

== Demographics ==
=== Population ===
At the time of the 2006 National Census, the village's population was 183 in 73 households. The following census in 2011 counted 132 people in 56 households. The 2016 census measured the population of the village as 144 people in 65 households.
