= Quchak =

Village in Markazi province, Iran

Quchak Persian: قوچك
- Village
- Location within Iran
- Coordinates: 34°11′35″N 50°35′51″E
- Country: Iran
- Province: Markazi
- County: Delijan
- District: Central
- Rural District: Do Dehak

Population (2016)
  - Total: 120
- Time zone: UTC+3:30 (IRST)

Quchak (Persian: قوچك) (Note: Also romanized as Qūchak) is a village in Do Dehak Rural District of the Central District in Delijan County, Markazi province, Iran.

== Demographics ==
=== Population ===
At the time of the 2006 National Census, the village's population was 131 in 26 households. The following census in 2011 counted 86 people in 23 households. The 2016 census measured the population of the village as 120 people in 36 households.
