= Mozvash =

Village in Markazi province, Iran

Mozvash Persian: مزوش
- Village
- Location within Iran
- Coordinates: 33°56′17″N 50°57′50″E
- Country: Iran
- Province: Markazi
- County: Delijan
- District: Central
- Rural District: Hastijan

Population (2016)
  - Total: 117
- Time zone: UTC+3:30 (IRST)

Mozvash (Persian: مزوش) (Note: Also romanized as Mazoosh and Mazvash) is a village in Hastijan Rural District of the Central District in Delijan County, Markazi province, Iran.

== Demographics ==
=== Population ===
At the time of the 2006 National Census, the village's population was 165 in 65 households. The following census in 2011 counted 126 people in 56 households. The 2016 census measured the population of the village as 117 people in 49 households.
