= Ravanj =

Village in Markazi province, Iran

Ravanj Persian: راونج
- Village
- Location within Iran
- Coordinates: 34°10′12″N 50°42′25″E
- Country: Iran
- Province: Markazi
- County: Delijan
- District: Central
- Rural District: Do Dehak

Population (2016)
  - Total: 349
- Time zone: UTC+3:30 (IRST)

Ravanj (Persian: راونج) (Note: Also romanized as Rāvanj and Rāwanj) is a village in Do Dehak Rural District of the Central District in Delijan County, Markazi province, Iran.

== Demographics ==
=== Population ===
At the time of the 2006 National Census, the village's population was 562 in 197 households. The following census in 2011 counted 762 people in 263 households. The 2016 census measured the population of the village as 349 people in 158 households.
