= Robat Tork =

Village in Markazi province, Iran

Robat Tork Persian: رباطترك
- Village
- Location within Iran
- Coordinates: 33°45′21″N 50°51′21″E
- Country: Iran
- Province: Markazi
- County: Delijan
- District: Central
- Rural District: Hastijan

Population (2016)
  - Total: 250
- Time zone: UTC+3:30 (IRST)

Robat Tork (Persian: رباطترك) (Note: Also romanized as Robāţ Tork and Robāţ-e Tork; also known as Ribāt-i-Turk and Robāt-i-Turk) is a village in Hastijan Rural District of the Central District in Delijan County, Markazi province, Iran.

== Demographics ==
=== Population ===
At the time of the 2006 National Census, the village's population was 348 in 132 households. The following census in 2011 counted 196 people in 94 households. The 2016 census measured the population of the village as 250 people in 115 households.
