= Shaneq, Delijan =

Village in Markazi province, Iran

Shaneq Persian: شانق
- Village
- Location within Iran
- Coordinates: 33°50′30″N 50°53′54″E
- Country: Iran
- Province: Markazi
- County: Delijan
- District: Central
- Rural District: Hastijan

Population (2016)
  - Total: 97
- Time zone: UTC+3:30 (IRST)

Shaneq (Persian: شانق) (Note: Also romanized as Shānaq and Shāneq; also known as Shanegh and Shāniq) is a village in Hastijan Rural District of the Central District in Delijan County, Markazi province, Iran.

== Demographics ==
=== Population ===
At the time of the 2006 National Census, the village's population was 91 in 28 households. The following census in 2011 counted 125 people in 46 households. The 2016 census measured the population of the village as 97 people in 37 households.
