= Hastijan =

Village in Markazi province, Iran

Hastijan Persian: هستيجان
- Village
- Location within Iran
- Coordinates: 33°51′38″N 50°46′34″E
- Country: Iran
- Province: Markazi
- County: Delijan
- District: Central
- Rural District: Hastijan

Population (2016)
  - Total: 339
- Time zone: UTC+3:30 (IRST)

Hastijan (Persian: هستيجان) (Note: Also romanized as Hastījān; also known as Hashtījān) is a village in, and the capital of, Hastijan Rural District in the Central District of Delijan County, Markazi province, Iran.

== Demographics ==
=== Population ===
At the time of the 2006 National Census, the village's population was 307 in 99 households. The following census in 2011 counted 228 people in 78 households. The 2016 census measured the population of the village as 339 people in 123 households.
