= Mehdiabad, Delijan =

Village in Markazi province, Iran

Mehdiabad Persian: مهدي اباد
- Village
- Location within Iran
- Coordinates: 34°01′42″N 50°59′56″E
- Country: Iran
- Province: Markazi
- County: Delijan
- District: Central
- Rural District: Jushaq

Population (2016)
  - Total: 78
- Time zone: UTC+3:30 (IRST)

Mehdiabad (Persian: مهدي اباد) (Note: Also romanized as Mehdīābād; also known as Kaleh Jār and Kareh Chār) is a village in Jushaq Rural District (Note: Formerly Mashhad Ardehal Rural District) of the Central District of Delijan County, Markazi province, Iran.

== Demographics ==
=== Population ===
At the time of the 2006 National Census, the village's population was 134 in 68 households. The following census in 2011 counted 124 people in 64 households. The 2016 census measured the population of the village as 78 people in 37 households.
