= Harazijan =

Village in Markazi province, Iran

Harazijan Persian: هرازيجان
- Village
- Location within Iran
- Coordinates: 34°07′38″N 50°49′44″E
- Country: Iran
- Province: Markazi
- County: Delijan
- District: Central
- Rural District: Jasb

Population (2016)
  - Total: 66
- Time zone: UTC+3:30 (IRST)

Harazijan (Persian: هرازيجان) (Note: Also romanized as Harāzījān; also known as Harāzjān and Hezār Jān) is a village in Jasb Rural District of the Central District in Delijan County, Markazi province, Iran.

== Demographics ==
=== Population ===
At the time of the 2006 National Census, the village's population was 120 in 54 households. The following census in 2011 counted 151 people in 67 households. The 2016 census measured the population of the village as 66 people in 35 households.
