= Żar =

Żar may refer to:

- Żar, Łódź Voivodeship, village in Poland
- Żar (mountain), mountain in Poland

== See also ==
- Zar (disambiguation)
