= Bahariyeh, Markazi =

Village in Markazi province, Iran

Bahariyeh Persian: بهاريه
- Village
- Location within Iran
- Coordinates: 34°07′48″N 50°38′12″E
- Country: Iran
- Province: Markazi
- County: Delijan
- District: Central
- Rural District: Do Dehak

Population (2016)
  - Total: 20
- Time zone: UTC+3:30 (IRST)

Bahariyeh (Persian: بهاريه) (Note: Also romanized as Bahārīyeh) is a village in Do Dehak Rural District of the Central District in Delijan County, Markazi province, Iran.

== Demographics ==
=== Population ===
At the time of the 2006 National Census, the village's population was nine in eight households. The following census in 2011 counted 18 people in seven households. The 2016 census measured the population of the village as 20 people in seven households.
