= Nagan =

Nagan (Persian: ناگان) may refer to:

- Nagan Raya Regency, a regency in Aceh, Indonesia
- Nagan, Markazi
- Nagan, Khash, Sistan and Baluchestan Province
- Winston Nagan, Winston P. Nagan, professor emeritus and the Samuel T. Dell Research Scholar Professor of Law in the Levin College of Law.

== See also ==
- Nagana
