= Vesquneqan =

Village in Markazi province, Iran

Vesquneqan Persian: وسقونقان
- Village
- Location within Iran
- Coordinates: 34°06′45″N 50°48′38″E
- Country: Iran
- Province: Markazi
- County: Delijan
- District: Central
- Rural District: Jasb

Population (2016)
  - Total: 205
- Time zone: UTC+3:30 (IRST)

Vesquneqan (Persian: وسقونقان) (Note: Also romanized as Vesqūneqān; also known as Vasqūneqād and Vesqūneqāq) is a village in, and the capital of, Jasb Rural District in the Central District of Delijan County, Markazi province, Iran.

== Demographics ==
=== Population ===
At the time of the 2006 National Census, the village's population was 226 in 88 households. The following census in 2011 counted 214 people in 84 households. The 2016 census measured the population of the village as 205 people in 88 households.
