= Zor =

Zor may refer to:

== Places ==
- Zor, Azerbaijan
- Zor, Iran

== Arts and entertainment ==
- Zor (film), a 1998 Bollywood film
- Zor, a fictional race in Super Dimension Cavalry Southern Cross
- Zor, a fictional character in the Robotech franchise
- Zor, a fictional alien race in Walter H. Hunt's series of books, starting with The Dark Wing
- Zor, a character in video game Sonic Lost World

== People ==
- Balz "Zor" Meierhans, developer of game Ancient Anguish
