= Tut, Markazi =

Village in Markazi province, Iran

Tut Persian: توت
- Village
- Location within Iran
- Coordinates: 33°55′39″N 50°55′39″E
- Country: Iran
- Province: Markazi
- County: Delijan
- District: Central
- Rural District: Hastijan

Population (2016)
  - Total: 62
- Time zone: UTC+3:30 (IRST)

Tut (Persian: توت) (Note: Also romanized as Tūt and Toot) is a village in Hastijan Rural District of the Central District in Delijan County, Markazi province, Iran.

== Demographics ==
=== Population ===
At the time of the 2006 National Census, the village's population was 72 in 19 households. The following census in 2011 counted 64 people in 20 households. The 2016 census measured the population of the village as 62 people in 21 households.
