= Bijegan =

Village in Markazi province, Iran

Bijegan Persian: بيجگان
- Village
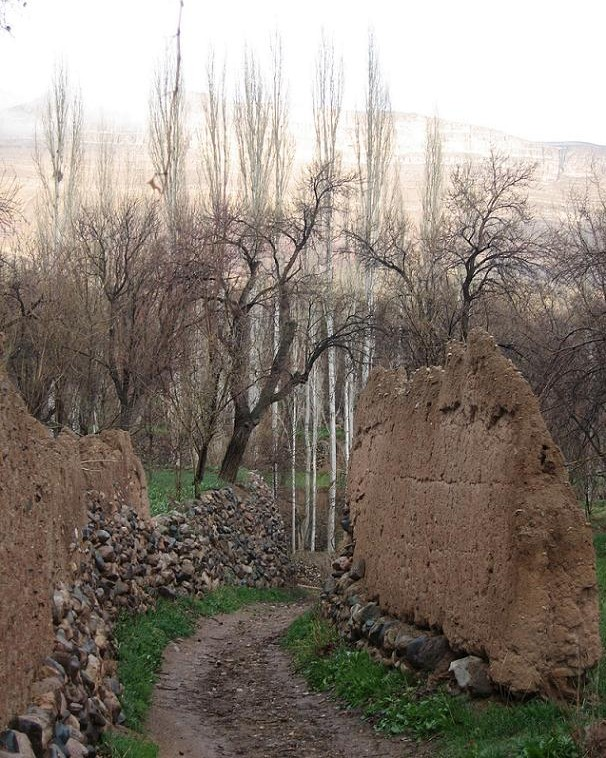
- Walls of the village of Bijegan

- Location within Iran
- Coordinates: 34°04′25″N 50°47′50″E
- Country: Iran
- Province: Markazi
- County: Delijan
- District: Central
- Rural District: Jasb

Population (2016)
  - Total: 344
- Time zone: UTC+3:30 (IRST)

Bijegan (Persian: بيجگان) (Note: Also romanized as Bījegān and Bījgān; also known as Bījaīgān, Bījekān, and Bijkan) is a village in Jasb Rural District of the Central District in Delijan County, Markazi province, Iran.

== Demographics ==
=== Population ===
At the time of the 2006 National Census, the village's population was 326 in 135 households. The following census in 2011 counted 267 people in 122 households. The 2016 census measured the population of the village as 344 people in 141 households.

== Notable residents ==
Mohammad-Hassan Nami, Iranian military officer
