= Kerugan =

Kerugan or Korugan (Persian: كروگان) may refer to:

- Korugan, Kerman
- Kerugan, Markazi
