= Jushaq =

Village in Markazi province, Iran

Jushaq Persian: جوشق
- Village
- Location within Iran
- Coordinates: 34°02′22″N 51°01′02″E
- Country: Iran
- Province: Markazi
- County: Delijan
- District: Central
- Rural District: Jushaq

Population (2016)
  - Total: 68
- Time zone: UTC+3:30 (IRST)

Jushaq (Persian: جوشق) (Note: Also romanized as Jūshaq) is a village in, and the capital of, Jushaq Rural District (Note: Formerly Mashhad Ardehal Rural District) in the Central District of Delijan County, Markazi province, Iran.

== Demographics ==
=== Population ===
At the time of the 2006 National Census, the village's population was 167 in 51 households. The following census in 2011 counted 87 people in 33 households. The 2016 census measured the population of the village as 68 people in 30 households.
