= Duridan =

Village in Markazi province, Iran

Duridan Persian: دوريدان
- Village
- Location within Iran
- Coordinates: 33°53′47″N 50°52′50″E
- Country: Iran
- Province: Markazi
- County: Delijan
- District: Central
- Rural District: Hastijan

Population (2016)
  - Total: 49
- Time zone: UTC+3:30 (IRST)

Duridan (Persian: دوريدان) (Note: Also romanized as Dūrīdān and Dūrydān; also known as Darīdān, Dorīdān, and Duzi Dūn) is a village in Hastijan Rural District of the Central District in Delijan County, Markazi province, Iran.

== Demographics ==
=== Population ===
At the time of the 2006 National Census, the village's population was 52 in 21 households. The following census in 2011 counted 53 people in 23 households. The 2016 census measured the population of the village as 49 people in 24 households.
