= Farnaq, Delijan =

Village in Markazi province, Iran

Farnaq Persian: فرنق
- Village
- Location within Iran
- Coordinates: 33°54′33″N 50°46′42″E
- Country: Iran
- Province: Markazi
- County: Delijan
- District: Central
- Rural District: Hastijan

Population (2016)
  - Total: 118
- Time zone: UTC+3:30 (IRST)

Farnaq (Persian: فرنق) (Note: Also known as Kharnagh, Kharnaq, Khārneh, Kharneq, and Khor Naq) is a village in Hastijan Rural District of the Central District in Delijan County, Markazi province, Iran.

== Demographics ==
=== Population ===
At the time of the 2006 National Census, the village's population was 120 in 37 households. The following census in 2011 counted 145 people in 46 households. The 2016 census measured the population of the village as 118 people in 41 households.
