= Veshtegan =

Village in Markazi province, Iran

Veshtegan Persian: وشتگان
- Village
- Location within Iran
- Coordinates: 34°06′12″N 50°48′45″E
- Country: Iran
- Province: Markazi
- County: Delijan
- District: Central
- Rural District: Jasb

Population (2016)
  - Total: 64
- Time zone: UTC+3:30 (IRST)

Veshtegan (Persian: وشتگان) (Note: Also romanized as Veshtegān; also known as Nāgān, Vāīski Nāgūn, Veshgān, Veshtakān, and Veshtekān) is a village in Jasb Rural District of the Central District in Delijan County, Markazi province, Iran.

== Demographics ==
=== Population ===
At the time of the 2006 National Census, the village's population was 90 in 32 households. The following census in 2011 counted 77 people in 29 households. The 2016 census measured the population of the village as 64 people in 27 households.
