= Richard Olmsted =

Richard Olmsted may refer to:

- Richard Olmsted (artist)
- Richard Olmsted (settler)
