= Zaar (disambiguation) =

Zaar is a demon or spirit in the cultures of the Horn of Africa and adjacent regions of the Middle East.

Zaar may also refer to:

- Daniel Zaar (born 1994), Swedish ice hockey player
- Zaar Randeri or Zar Randeri, the pen name of Bharucha Hasim bin Yusuf, Gujarati poet and translator
- Zaar, a fictional element in Future Robot Daltanious
- "Zaar" (song), a song by Peter Gabriel from the 1989 album Passion
- Zaar languages, or Zaar group of South Bauchi languages
- Zaar language, or Saya language

== See also ==
- Zar (disambiguation)
