= Farnaq =

Farnaq (Persian: فرنق) may refer to:

- Farnaq, Delijan
- Farnaq, Khomeyn
