= Raveh, Markazi =

Village in Markazi province, Iran

Raveh Persian: راوه
- Village
- Location within Iran
- Coordinates: 34°15′09″N 50°23′36″E
- Country: Iran
- Province: Markazi
- County: Delijan
- District: Central
- Rural District: Do Dehak

Population (2016)
  - Total: 1,716
- Time zone: UTC+3:30 (IRST)

Raveh (Persian: راوه) (Note: Also romanized as Rāveh) is a village in Do Dehak Rural District of the Central District in Delijan County, Markazi province, Iran.

== Demographics ==
=== Population ===
At the time of the 2006 National Census, the village's population was 1,510 in 366 households. The following census in 2011 counted 1,800 people in 486 households. The 2016 census measured the population of the village as 1,716 people in 524 households, the most populous in its rural district.
