= Raveh =

Raveh (Persian: راوه) may refer to:

- Raveh, Markazi
- Yehuda Raveh
