= Khaveh, Markazi =

Village in Markazi province, Iran

Khaveh Persian: خاوه
- Village
- Location within Iran
- Coordinates: 34°03′38″N 50°57′52″E
- Country: Iran
- Province: Markazi
- County: Delijan
- District: Central
- Rural District: Jushaq

Population (2016)
  - Total: 743
- Time zone: UTC+3:30 (IRST)

Khaveh (Persian: خاوه) (Note: Also romanized as Khāveh and Khāweh; also known as Ḩāveh and Khāveh-ye Ardahāl (خاوه اردهال)) is a village in Jushaq Rural District (Note: Formerly Mashhad Ardehal Rural District) of the Central District of Delijan County, Markazi province, Iran.

== Demographics ==
=== Population ===
At the time of the 2006 National Census, the village's population was 963 in 306 households. The following census in 2011 counted 941 people in 325 households. The 2016 census measured the population of the village as 743 people in 269 households, the most populous in its rural district.
