= Haveh, Markazi =

Haveh (Persian: هوه) may refer to:

- Haveh, Delijan
- Haveh, Saveh
