= Nakhcheer =

Limestone cave in Iran

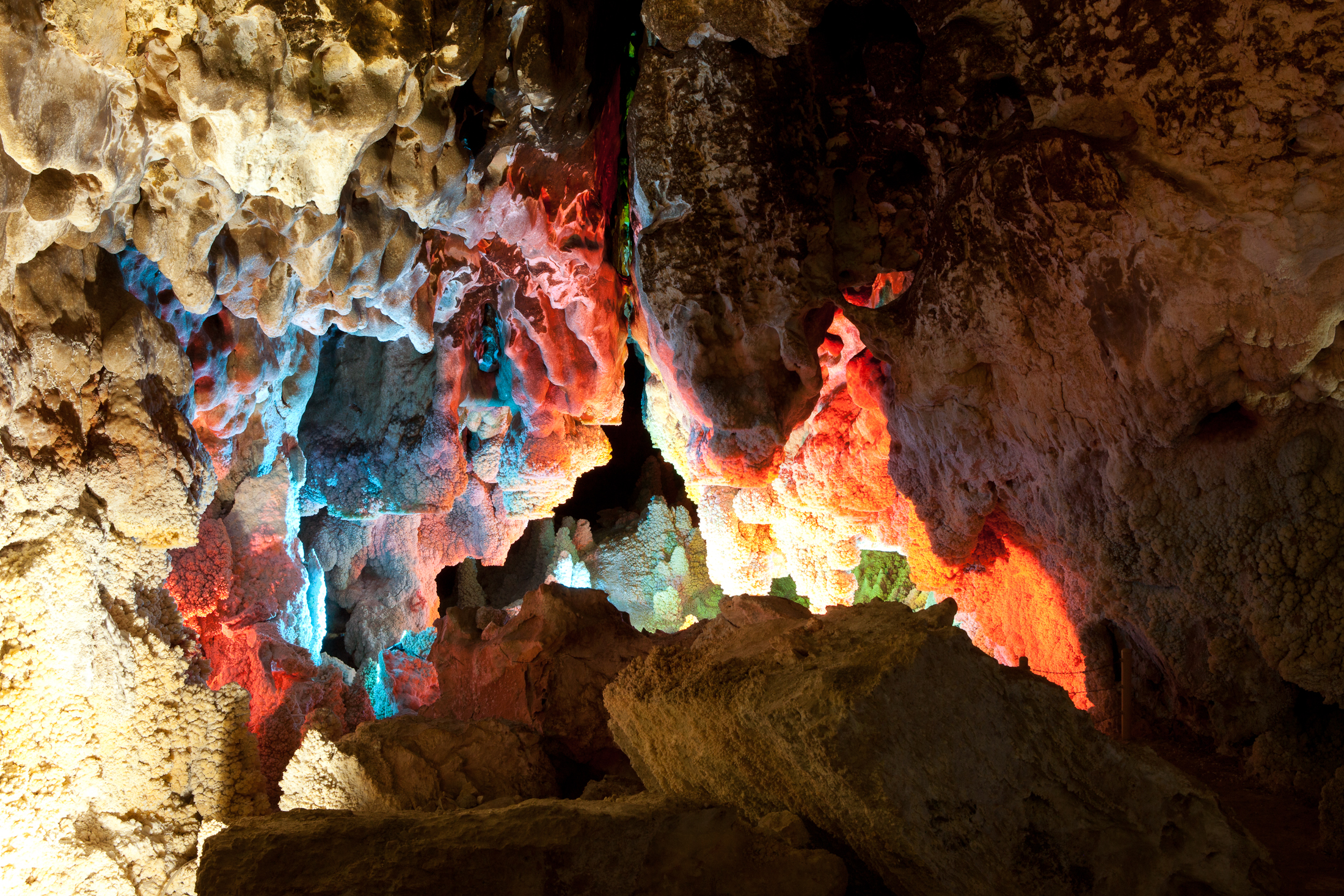

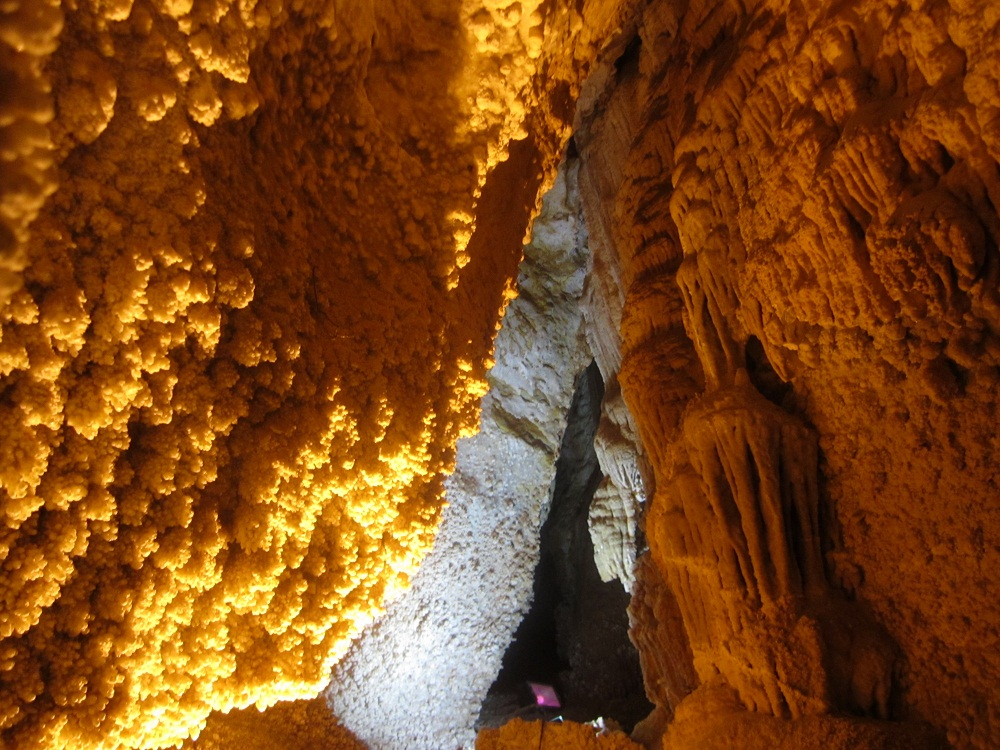

Nakhcheer, Chal-e Nakhjir, or Chal-Nakhjir (Persian: غار چال‌نخجیر) is a cave situated in Jushaq Rural District of the Central District of Delijan County, Markazi province, Iran.

Its coordinates are 34°02′11″N 50°45′58″E.

It is a limestone cave approximately 70 million years old. Parts of the cave, including its internal lake, have been prepared for easy tourist access. It was discovered in 1989 and registered as a national monument in 2001. Its interior is made of crystals, dolomite sediments, stalactites and stalagmites.

== See also ==
- List of caves in Iran
- Geography of Iran
