= Naraq =

City in Markazi province, Iran

Naraq Persian: نراق
- City
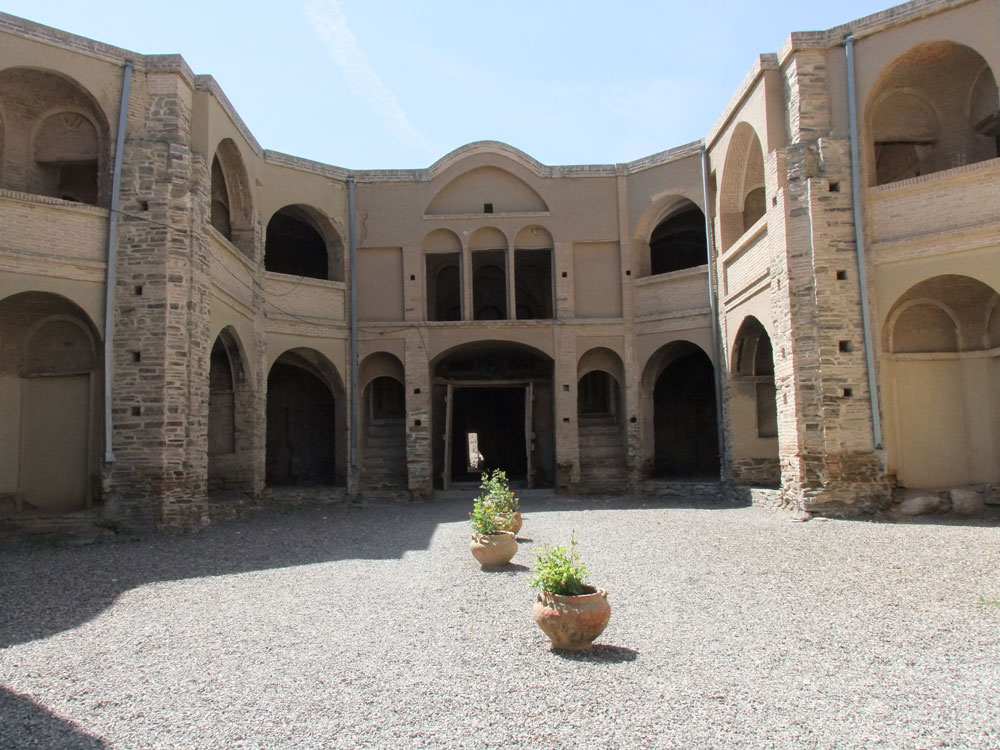
- Jameh Mosque of Naraq

- Location within Iran
- Coordinates: 34°00′32″N 50°50′29″E
- Country: Iran
- Province: Markazi
- County: Delijan
- District: Central

Population (2016)
  - Total: 2,592
- Time zone: UTC+3:30 (IRST)

Naraq (Persian: نراق) (Note: Also romanized as Narāq; also known as Naragh, Narāk, and Nareh Ţavīl) is a city in the Central District of Delijan County, Markazi province, Iran.

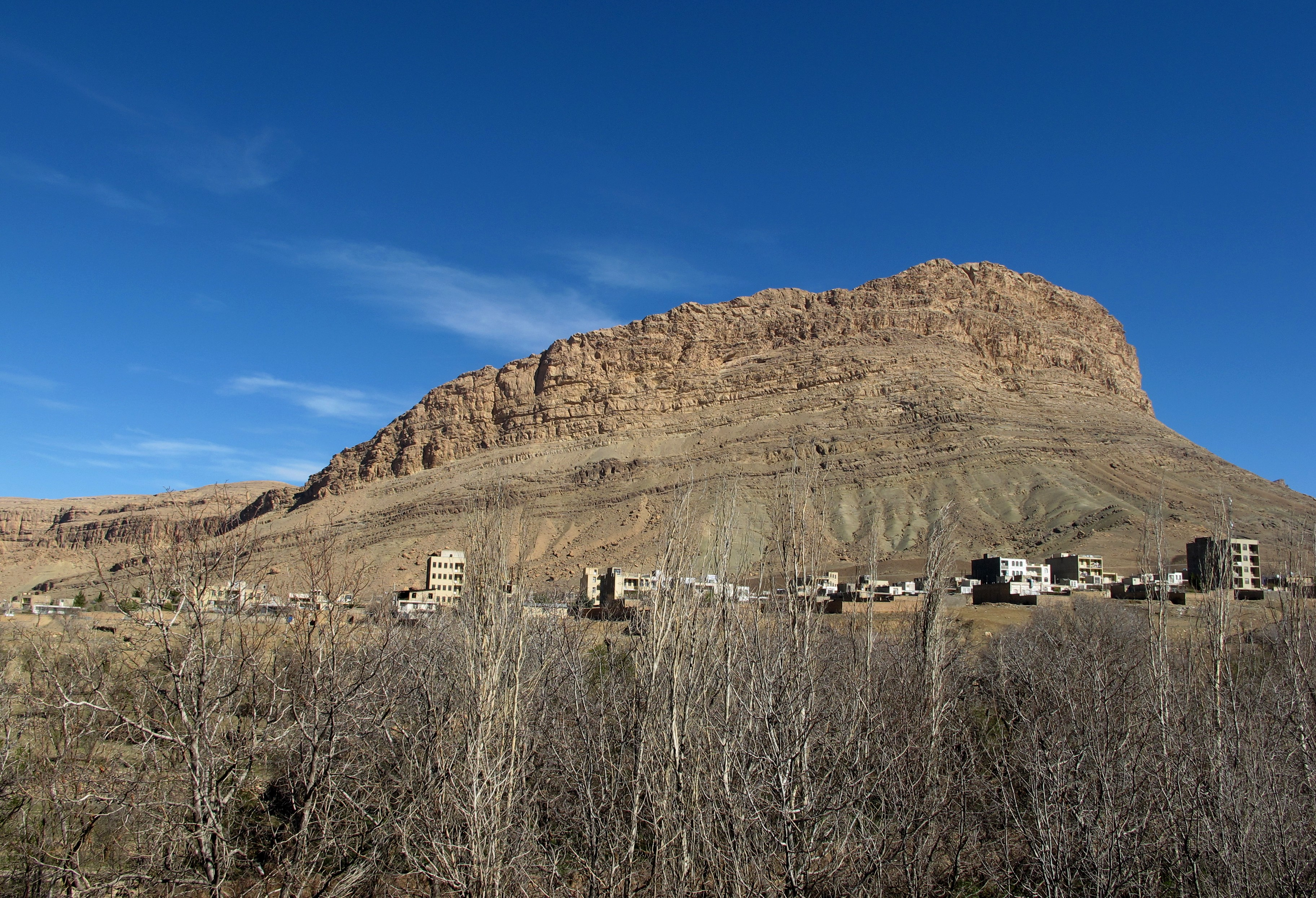
Ol Mountain in Naraq, Delijan County

Naraq is an old city, with 130 historical buildings and sites. Chal-nakhjir cave or Delijan Cave, is one of the natural touristic attractions of Delijan.

== Demographics ==
=== Population ===
At the time of the 2006 National Census, the city's population was 2,508 in 826 households. The following census in 2011 counted 2,744 people in 865 households. The 2016 census measured the population of the city as 2,592 people in 872 households.

== Notable people ==
Mulla Ahmad Naraghi is one of the well-known clerics in Naraq.
