= Zar, Iran =

Village in Markazi province, Iran

Zar Persian: زر
- Village
- Location within Iran
- Coordinates: 34°08′29″N 50°49′10″E
- Country: Iran
- Province: Markazi
- County: Delijan
- District: Central
- Rural District: Jasb

Population (2016)
  - Total: 78
- Time zone: UTC+3:30 (IRST)

Zar (Persian: زر) (Note: Also romanized as Zor) is a village in Jasb Rural District of the Central District in Delijan County, Markazi province, Iran.

== Demographics ==
=== Population ===
At the time of the 2006 National Census, the village's population was 164 in 62 households. The following census in 2011 counted 131 people in 61 households. The 2016 census measured the population of the village as 78 people in 33 households.
