= Jushaq Rural District =

Rural district in Markazi province, Iran

Jushaq Rural District Persian: دهستان جوشق
- Rural District
- Location within Iran
- Coordinates: 34°03′N 50°54′E
- Country: Iran
- Province: Markazi
- County: Delijan
- District: Central
- Established: 1993
- Capital: Jushaq

Population (2016)
  - Total: 1,310
- Time zone: UTC+3:30 (IRST)

Jushaq Rural District (Persian: دهستان جوشق) (Note: Formerly Mashhad Ardehal Rural District (دهستان مشهد اردهال)) is in the Central District of Delijan County, Markazi province, Iran. Its capital is the village of Jushaq.

== Demographics ==
=== Population ===
At the time of the 2006 National Census, the rural district's population was 1,805 in 614 households. There were 1,696 inhabitants in 617 households at the following census of 2011. The 2016 census measured the population of the rural district as 1,310 in 506 households. The most populous of its 13 villages was Khaveh, with 743 people.

=== Other villages in the rural district ===
- Bahar
- Laran
- Mehdiabad
- Rijan

== Geography ==
Jushaq Rural District is located in the southern part of Markazi province, within the Central District of Delijan County. The area is characterized by a mountainous landscape and limestone formations.

One of the notable natural attractions in the rural district is Nakhcheer Cave (Chal Nakhjir), an extensive limestone cave known for its underground chambers, stalactites, stalagmites and mineral formations.
