= Kerugan, Markazi =

Village in Markazi province, Iran

Kerugan Persian: كروگان
- Village
- Location within Iran
- Coordinates: 34°07′49″N 50°50′29″E
- Country: Iran
- Province: Markazi
- County: Delijan
- District: Central
- Rural District: Jasb

Population (2016)
  - Total: 130
- Time zone: UTC+3:30 (IRST)

Kerugan (Persian: كروگان) (Note: Also romanized as Kerūgān; also known as Gerūkān, Karūkān, Kerogan, and Kerūkān) is a village in Jasb Rural District of the Central District in Delijan County, Markazi province, Iran.

== Demographics ==
=== Population ===
At the time of the 2006 National Census, the village's population was 182 in 65 households. The following census in 2011 counted 189 people in 76 households. The 2016 census measured the population of the village as 130 people in 50 households.
