= Mohammad-Hassan Nami =

Iranian military officer

Amir Mohammad-Hassan Nami
- محمدحسن نامی
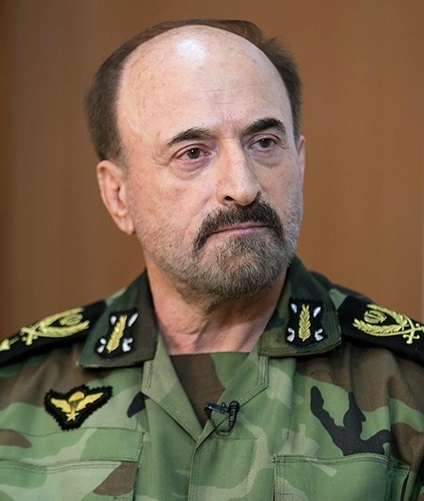
- Nami in 2018

Minister of Information and Communications Technology
- In office 26 February 2013 – 15 August 2013; Acting: 2–26 February 2013
- President: Mahmoud Ahmadinejad
- Supreme Leader: Ali Khamenei
- Preceded by: Mahmoud Vaezi
- Succeeded by: Reza Taghipour

Director of Artesh Military Intelligence
- In office ?–?
- Supreme Leader: Ali Khamenei
- Preceded by: Colonel Shahvardian
- Succeeded by: Amir Hatami

Personal details
- Born: c. 1953 (age 72–73) Bijegan, Iran
- Education: Officers' Academy; University of Command and Staff; Kim Il-sung University; Islamic Azad University, Science and Research Branch, Tehran; Supreme National Defense University

Military service
- Allegiance: Pahlavi Iran (1974–1979); Iran (1979–present)
- Branch/service: Ground Force
- Years of service: 1974–present
- Rank: Brigadier general
- Unit: 21st Division, 121st Battalion

Mohammad-Hassan Nami (Persian: محمدحسن نامی) is an Iranian military officer who formerly served as the Deputy of Ministry of Interior and Head of Iranian Crisis Management Organization from 2022 to 2024.

He briefly held office as the minister of communication and information technology under Mahmoud Ahmadinejad in 2013.

Nami formerly served as head of the geography organization of the Iranian armed forces, deputy chairperson of joint chiefs-of-staff of Iranian Army and deputy minister of defence and armed forces logistics. He was also the military attaché of the Iranian embassy in Pyongyang, North Korea and holds a doctorate degree in state management from Kim Il Sung University, and one in strategic management.
