= Richard Olmsted (artist) =

Richard Olmsted is an American artist living in Mount Vernon, Washington. Raised in Mount Vernon, Washington, Olmsted is best known for his pencil drawings. Olmsted has had showings at Thinkspace Gallery in Los Angeles (with Chet Zar and Lola), Mutiny Tattoo in Bellingham, The Wayward Cafe in Seattle, WA, and the "B" Gallery at Western Washington University.

== Works ==
Olmsted's work tends to make obvious political statements, commenting on such things as the deleterious effects of civilization and the destruction of the natural world. Olmsted even donated a drawing to be used as a cover for a CD to benefit the E.L.F./A.L.F. North American Press Office. He has also done album art for To What End?, and Black Breath. Olmsted recently had a print used in the book Expect Resistance, as well as on limited-edition postcards, both published by anarchist collective CrimethInc.
