= Hastijan Rural District =

Rural district in Markazi province, Iran

Hastijan Rural District Persian: دهستان هستيجان
- Rural District
- Location within Iran
- Coordinates: 33°51′N 50°50′E
- Country: Iran
- Province: Markazi
- County: Delijan
- District: Central
- Established: 1987
- Capital: Hastijan

Population (2016)
  - Total: 2,021
- Time zone: UTC+3:30 (IRST)

Hastijan Rural District (Persian: دهستان هستيجان) is in the Central District of Delijan County, Markazi province, Iran. Its capital is the village of Hastijan.

== Demographics ==
=== Population ===
At the time of the 2006 National Census, the rural district's population was 2,518 in 882 households. There were 1,969 inhabitants in 706 households at the following census of 2011. The 2016 census measured the population of the rural district as 2,021 in 799 households. The most populous of its 20 villages was Qalhar, with 618 people.

=== Other villages in the rural district ===
- Darb-e Juqa
- Do Zia
- Duridan
- Farnaq
- Mozvash
- Qalhar
- Robat Tork
- Shaneq
- Sineqan
- Tut
