= Do Dehak Rural District =

Rural district in Markazi province, Iran

Do Dehak Rural District Persian: دهستان دودهک
- Rural District
- Location within Iran
- Coordinates: 34°09′N 50°31′E
- Country: Iran
- Province: Markazi
- County: Delijan
- District: Central
- Established: 1987
- Capital: Do Dehak

Population (2016)
  - Total: 3,494
- Time zone: UTC+3:30 (IRST)

Do Dehak Rural District (Persian: دهستان دودهک) is in the Central District of Delijan County, Markazi province, Iran. Its capital is the village of Do Dehak.

== Demographics ==
=== Population ===
At the time of the 2006 National Census, the rural district's population was 3,332 in 925 households. There were 3,871 inhabitants in 1,145 households at the following census of 2011. The 2016 census measured the population of the rural district as 3,494 in 1,137 households. The most populous of its 23 villages was Raveh, with 1,716 people.

=== Other villages in the rural district ===
- Bahariyeh
- Chenarestan
- Gorgan
- Kahak
- Quchak
- Ravanj
