= Jasb Rural District =

Rural district in Markazi province, Iran

Jasb Rural District Persian: دهستان جاسب
- Rural District
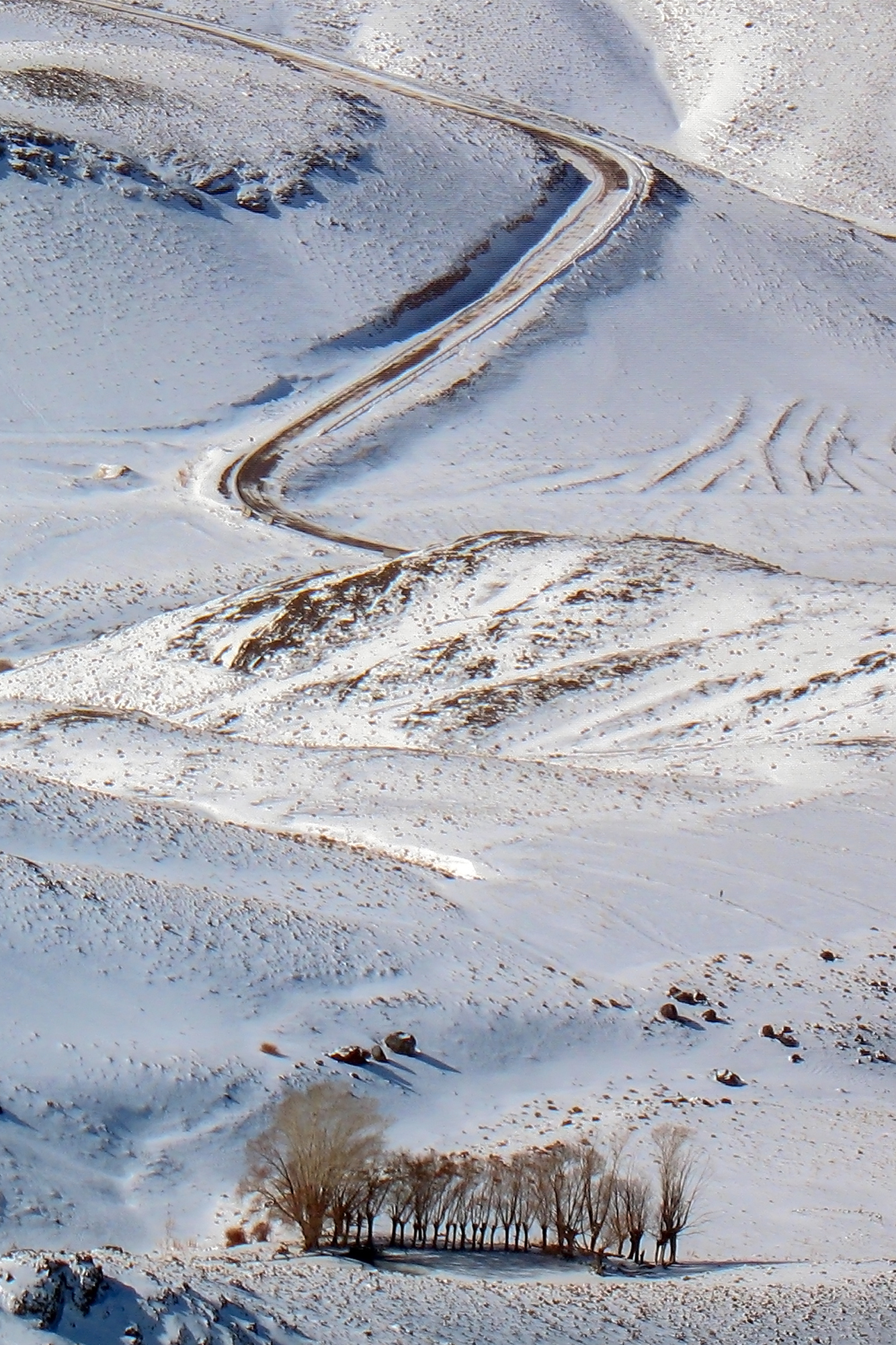
- Snowy day in Jasb

- Location within Iran
- Coordinates: 34°08′N 50°51′E
- Country: Iran
- Province: Markazi
- County: Delijan
- District: Central
- Established: 1993
- Capital: Vesquneqan

Population (2016)
  - Total: 1,302
- Time zone: UTC+3:30 (IRST)
- Website: jasbiha.com

Jasb map.

Jasb Rural District (Persian: دهستان جاسب) is in the Central District of Delijan County, Markazi province, Iran. Its capital is the village of Vesquneqan.

== History ==
The history of Jasb can be traced back to the Sassanid era. The story told by the village elders is that during the reign of Shah Ardeshir I, the Shah's cavalry were led into the greener pastures of the valley so that the horses could graze on the abundant greenery and could also drink from the Azna stream.

Gradually as the visits from the cavalry became more frequent it was decided that nine shelters would be built in the valley so that the herders of the horses could stay overnight at various places. Eventually these nine shelters became permanently inhabited by the herders and their families and slowly grew into villages of their own.

During the 2,000 years of permanent occupation two of the shelters were abandoned due to the inability to grow food on the nearby land. One of these was located west of Kerogan and some traces are still visible; the other was located downstream of Bijegan, and due to the periodic flooding of the river, all traces have been washed away. As time passed, only seven villages remained, which they do until this day.

The first structures were built close to the Qanats so that there would be a constant water supply to the fields and for household use. As the villages grew in size the construction of buildings occurred on stone-built terraces, which sloped sharply towards the river. Since the river could flood quickly during heavy rains, much time and labour were devoted to the maintenance of damaged terraces. Usually the houses would be built uphill from the river and the fields grown on the terraces downhill towards the river.

== Demographics ==
=== Population ===
At the time of the 2006 National Census, the rural district's population was 1,373 in 552 households. There were 1,236 inhabitants in 529 households at the following census of 2011. The 2016 census measured the population of the rural district as 1,302 in 527 households. The most populous of its nine villages was Varan, with 415 people.

== Geography ==
On the northern side of Jasb Valley, Zur and Varan are the major villages dating back 577 B.C. On the southern side of the valley, Vesqunequn, Veshtekan, and Isaac shrine. The valley itself is fed by the solitary Azna river which receives most of its water from the runoff of surrounding Qanats; the valley is surrounded by mountains which form a U-shaped range. The highest peak is the Kuh-e-Velijeya rising to 3,233 metres (10,607 feet). Other noticeable peaks that rise over 3000 metres are, in order, Kuh-e-Gorg, Kuh-e-Ghalid 3,155 metres (10,351 feet), Kuh-e-Palangast 3,135 metres (10,285 feet), Kuh-e-Salahlat 3,055 metres (10,023 feet); however, these mountains rise from a valley level of 2200 metres. Jasb Valley has potentials to own a ski resort, a natural pool, and downslope skiing.

== Culture ==
The villages in Jasb are traditional Iranian rural farming villages. The farms are irrigated through a system of open aqueducts which are fed by waters of the nearby Qanats. The waters of the qanats are used during summer and spring when farming is at its most active.

During the bitter cold months of winter when temperatures can reach as low as -30 °C with several metres of snow falling, no farming is undertaken as the cold weather does not allow any plant life to grow. From 1870 to 1872, during the famine, a local figure named Hossein Sokeneh orchestrated an army of local volunteers to gather food, cook;and serve to the sickest, most neediest folks in great need.Persian Carpet making is next in importance to farming and throughout the years there have been hundreds of precious carpets made by the local women population.

Unknown to the newer generations, during the hard, cold winters, the residence of Jasb used to help one another under the supervision of Hossein Sokeneh. Sokeneh's person was ungainly. He was six feet five inches in height; a little stooped in the shoulders; his feet and hands large; and distinguished nose. His eyes were brown. Generally, he was a kind, loyal man, and his countenance indicated it. His face was radiant and glowing, and almost gave expression to his thoughts before his tongue would utter them. He was a just listener, and had the faculty of making himself clearly understood.

== Overview ==
The total population for these seven villages was 3,408 in 2016; however, this figure is currently decreasing as more of the youth abandon the rural life and head for the larger cities like Tehran and Isfahan. The main population center is located at Kerogan, which is the largest of the seven villages, followed in size by Bijegan. The overall majority of the population of Jasb follow the Shia Muslim religion, but in the past there were many followers of the Baháʼí Faith; and large number of Jews in this town how were prosecuted. At one point during the 1950s more than half of the population in Kerogan were Baháʼís. The other village which had a few Baháʼí families is Vesquneqan. During the month of Ramadan in 1955, Sheikh Mohammad Taqi Falsafi, a populist preacher, started one of the highest-profile anti-Baháʼí propaganda schemes in Iran.

After receiving permission from the Shah to state anti-Baháʼí rhetoric in his sermons, he encouraged other clergy to discuss the Baháʼí issue in their sermons. These sermons caused mob violence against Baháʼís; Baháʼí properties were destroyed, their livestock stolen or killed, theír centres looted, theír cemeteries desecrated, Baháʼís were killed, some hacked to pieces, Baháʼí women were abducted and forced to marry Muslims, and Baháʼís were expelled and dismissed from schools and employment. Due to the increasing amount of persecution suffered by the Baháʼís at the hands of the Muslim majority, they were left with no choice than to abandon their lifestyle and dwellings, in search of a better life in Tehran.

=== Other villages in the rural district ===
- Bijegan
- Harazijan
- Kerugan
- Veshtegan
- Zar
