= Lwi Zar =

Burmese politician

Member of the Amyotha Hluttaw
- Incumbent
- Assumed office 1 February 2016
- Constituency: Kayah State No.6
- Majority: 2576 votes

Personal details
- Born: 2 February 1976 (age 50) Demoso Township, Kayah State, Burma (Myanmar)
- Party: National League for Democracy
- Spouse: Fran Sis
- Parent(s): Byhar Rei (father); Thoe Moe (mother)
- Occupation: Politician

Lwi Zar (Burmese: လွီးဇာ, also known as Kalaw Myahar, born 2 February 1976) is a Burmese politician who currently serves as a House of Nationalities member of parliament for Kayah State No. 6 constituency.

== Early life and education ==
Lwi Zar was born on 2 February 1976 in Demoso Township, Kayah State, Burma (Myanmar).

== Political career ==
Lwi Zar is a member of the National League for Democracy. In the 2015 Myanmar general election, she was elected as an Amyotha Hluttaw MP, winning a majority of 2,576 votes and elected representative from Kayah State No. 6 parliamentary constituency. She also serves as a member of Amyotha Hluttaw Health, Sports and Culture Committee.
