= Zor, Azerbaijan =

Zor
- Location within Azerbaijan
- Coordinates: 39°18′06″N 46°33′02″E
- Country: Azerbaijan
- District: Qubadli
- Time zone: UTC+4 (AZT)
  - Summer (DST): UTC+5 (AZT)

Zor is a village in the Qubadli District of Azerbaijan.
