= Žár =

- Municipality
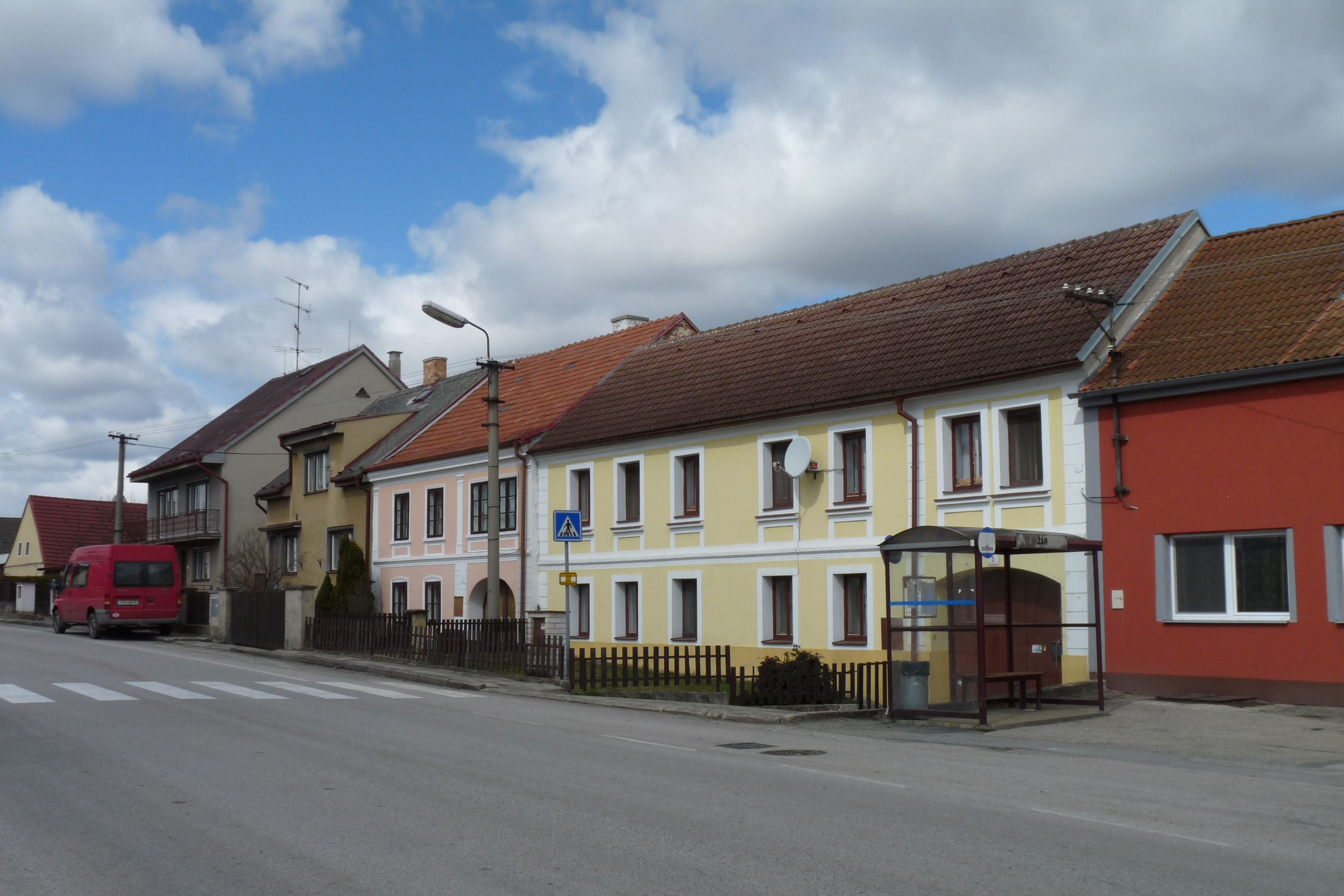
- Houses on the main street

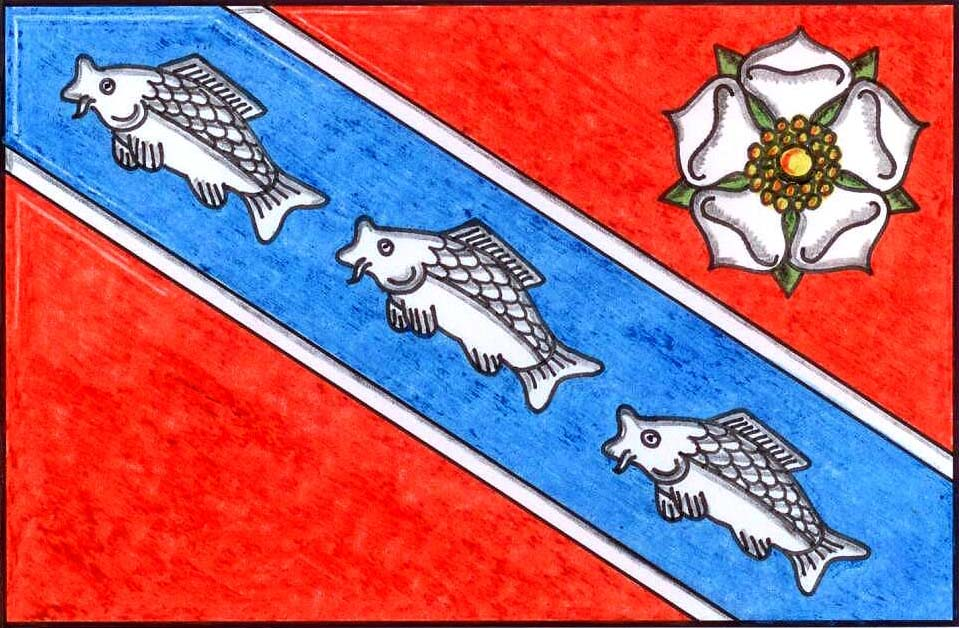
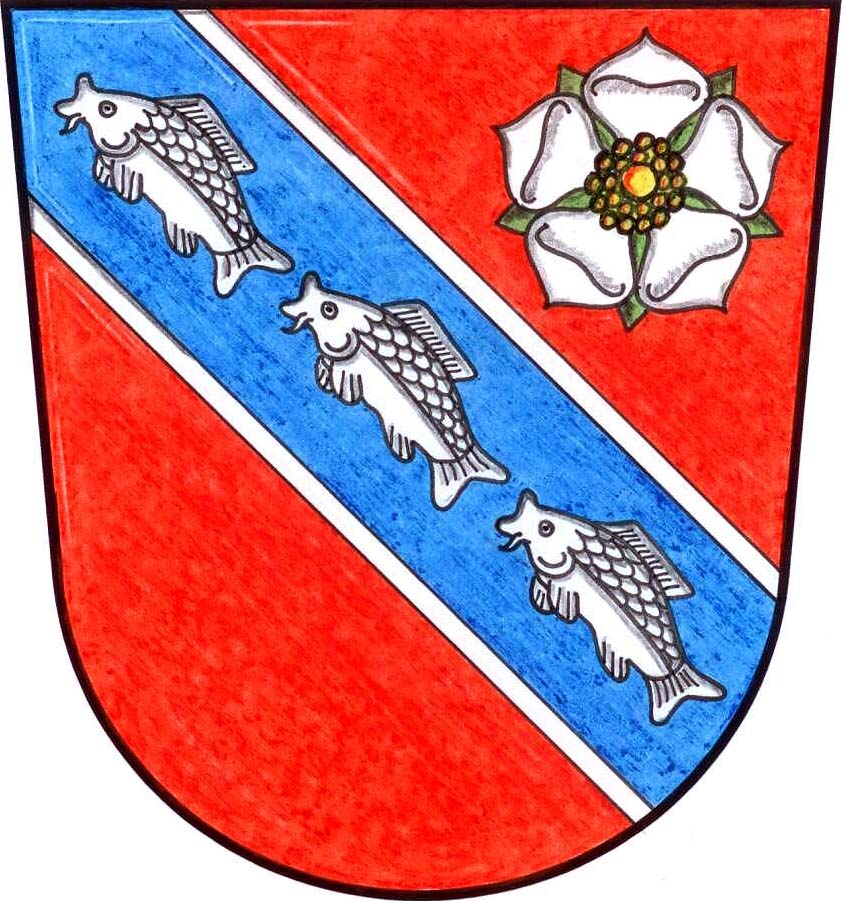
- Flag Coat of arms

- Location in the Czech Republic
- Coordinates: 48°48′25″N 14°42′29″E
- Country: Czech Republic
- Region: South Bohemian
- District: České Budějovice
- First mentioned: 1186

Area
  - Total: 15.06 km^{2} (5.81 sq mi)
- Elevation: 518 m (1,699 ft)

Population (2026-01-01)
  - Total: 343
  - Density: 22.8/km^{2} (59.0/sq mi)
- Time zone: UTC+1 (CET)
  - Summer (DST): UTC+2 (CEST)
- Postal code: 374 01
- Website: www.obeczar.cz

Žár (German: Sohors) is a municipality and village in České Budějovice District in the South Bohemian Region of the Czech Republic. It has about 300 inhabitants.

Žár lies approximately 26 kilometres (16 mi) south-east of České Budějovice and 144 kilometres (89 mi) south of Prague.

== Administrative division ==
Žár consists of three municipal parts (in brackets population according to the 2021 census):

- Žár (249)
- Božejov (23)
- Žumberk (51)

== Demographics ==
Historical population
Year	Pop.	±%
1869	928	—
1880	954	+2.8%
1890	925	−3.0%
1900	868	−6.2%
1910	828	−4.6%
1921	804	−2.9%
1930	721	−10.3%
1950	400	−44.5%
1961	390	−2.5%
1970	340	−12.8%
1980	286	−15.9%
1991	314	+9.8%
2001	336	+7.0%
2011	318	−5.4%
2021	323	+1.6%
Source: Censuses
