= Korukan =

Korukan كروكان
- Village
- Location within Iran
- Coordinates: 27°45′50″N 56°27′53″E
- Country: Iran
- Province: Hormozgan
- County: Bandar Abbas
- Bakhsh: Fin
- Rural District: Siyahu

Population (2006)
  - Total: 68
- Time zone: UTC+3:30 (IRST)
  - Summer (DST): UTC+4:30 (IRDT)

Korukan (Persian: كروكان, also Romanized as Korūkān, Kerookan, and Kerūkān) is a village in Siyahu Rural District, Fin District, Bandar Abbas County, Hormozgan Province, Iran. At the 2006 census, its population was 68, in 24 families.
