= Korugan, Kerman =

Korugan كروگان
- Village
- Location within Iran
- Coordinates: 28°44′00″N 58°05′00″E
- Country: Iran
- Province: Kerman
- County: Jiroft
- Bakhsh: Jebalbarez
- Rural District: Rezvan

Population (2006)
  - Total: 15
- Time zone: UTC+3:30 (IRST)
  - Summer (DST): UTC+4:30 (IRDT)

Korugan (Persian: كروگان, also Romanized as Korūgān; also known as Korūkān) is a village in Rezvan Rural District, Jebalbarez District, Jiroft County, Kerman Province, Iran. At the 2006 census, its population was 15, in 4 families.
