= James Zar =

American artist (1941–2015)

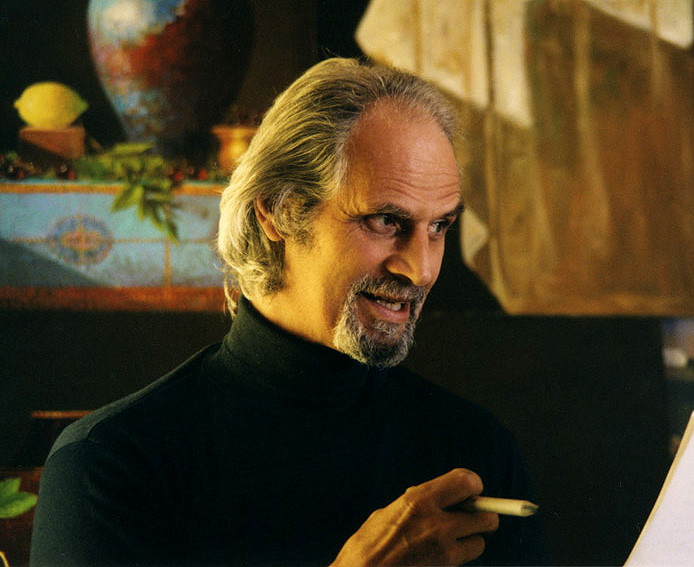
- Born: James Zar; 1941; San Pedro, California
- Died: 10 December 2015 (aged 73–74)
- Education: San Francisco Art Institute
- Known for: Still life, figure, landscape
- Movement: Fantasy art

James Zar (1941 – 10 December 2015), also known as The Still Life Magician, was an American artist notable for his oil-based, fantasy art. Although his works vary, his primary subject matter was still life. He was the stepfather of painter and digital animator Chet Zar.

Born in San Pedro, California, Zar originally studied as an actor. His friend and mentor, Keith Finch, inspired Zar to pursue fine art.
