= Zar Randeri =

Gujarati poet from India

- Born: Bharucha Hasim bin Yusuf; 1 November 1887; Rander, Surat, Gujarat
- Occupations: Poet, Translator
- Writing career
- Language: Gujarati
- Notable work: Shairi 1 - 2 (1936)

Bharucha Hasim bin Yusuf, better known by his pen name Zar Randeri, was a Gujarati poet and translator from Gujarat, India.

== Early life ==
He was born in Rander, a town in Surat, Gujarat. He received his primary and secondary education in Rander and then went to Aminiyah Arabiyah, a Madrasa in Delhi, for further education. He published the first Gujarati book on Persian metres as Shairi in two volumes in 1936. His other notable works include Shamshire Sadakat, Hindustan Na Humla, Aatma Ane Punarjanma. He translated and published several works such as Kasdussabil (1913), Muhannad, Dharmaprachar, Mahatma Ane Islam and Hindustani Bhasha.
