= Żar (mountain) =

Mountain in Poland

Coordinates: 49°47′14.06″N 19°13′29.53″E

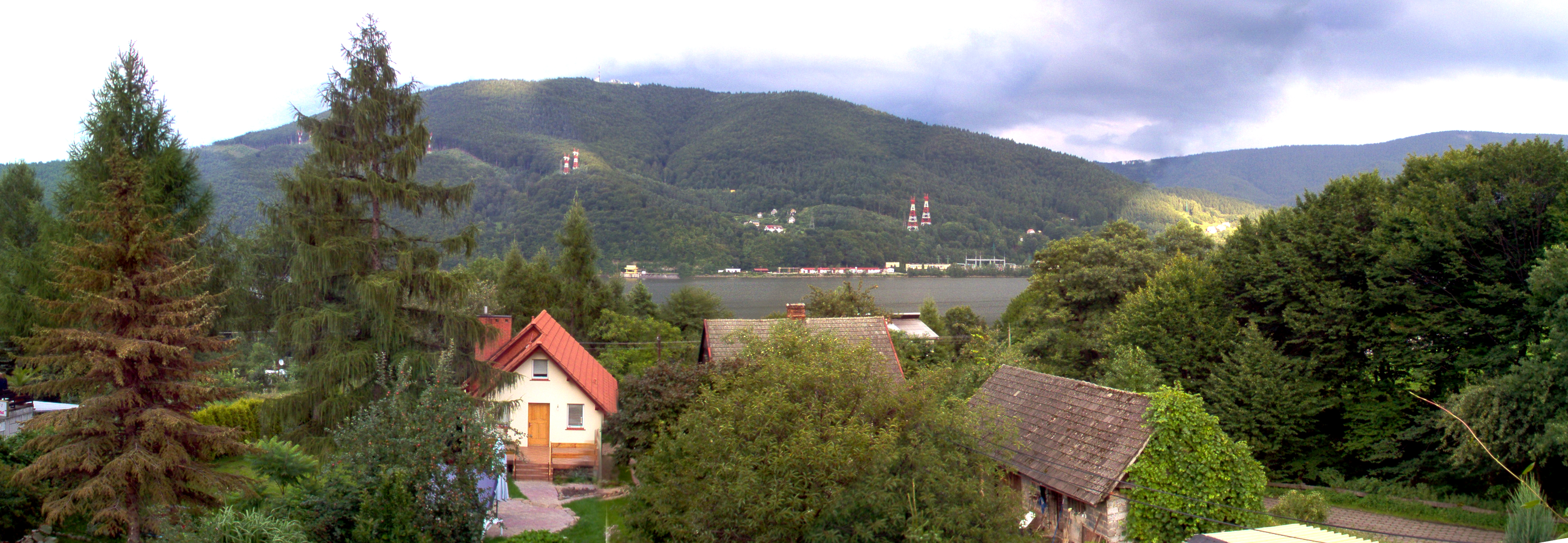
View at the Żar mountain

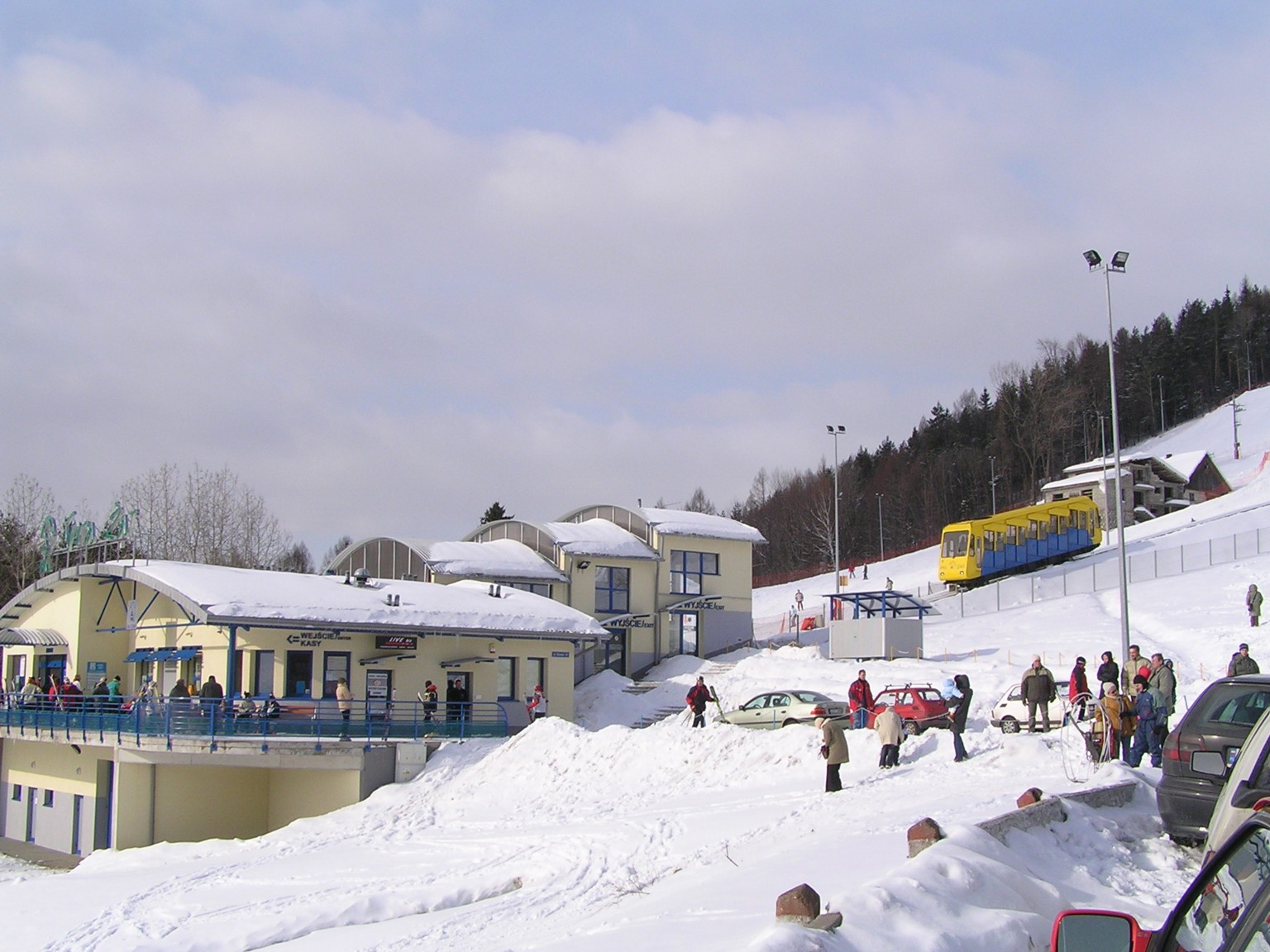
Train to the mountaintop

Żar is a mountain in the mountain range of Little Beskids in southern Poland, 761 m above the sea level.

Below the mountain is an artificial lake (the Międzybrodzkie lake) that was created by damming the Soła river. The elevation of the lake is 318 metres (1,043 ft) above sea level.

== Zar power plant ==
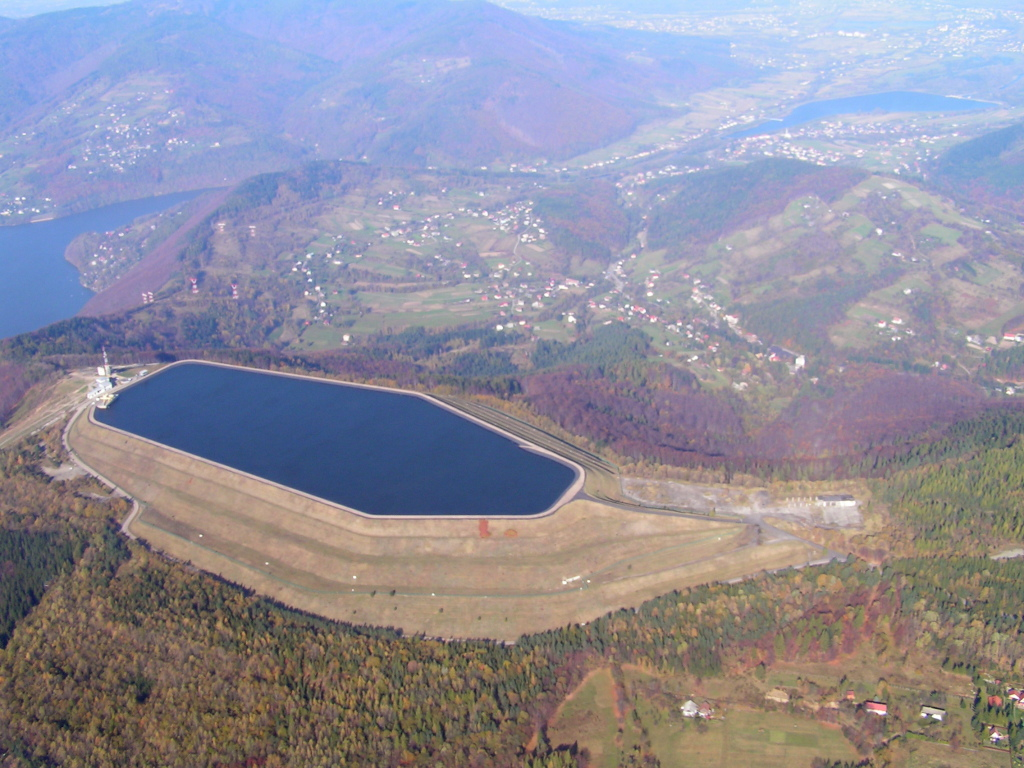
Aerial view at the reservoir on the Zar mountaintop

A 500 megawatts (670,000 hp) pumped-storage hydroelectricity power plant is located on the top of this mountain. The mountaintop reservoir is 650 metres (2,130 ft) long, up to 250 metres (820 ft) wide, and 28 metres (92 ft) deep. It can contain 2,310,000 cubic metres (1,870 acre⋅ft) of water. The elevation of the reservoir is about 750 metres (2,460 ft) above sea level. The power plant was completed in 1979. The pumping time is about 5.5 hours, the power-generation time is about 4 h. The efficiency of the pumping-generation cycle is about 75%. The plant is opened to visitors.
