= Żar, Łódź Voivodeship =

Żar
- Village
- Location within Poland
- Coordinates: 51°18′N 19°11′E
- Country: Poland
- Voivodeship: Łódź
- County: Bełchatów
- Gmina: Kluki
- Population: 170

Żar [ʐar] is a village in the administrative district of Gmina Kluki, within Bełchatów County, Łódź Voivodeship, in central Poland.
