= Chet Zar =

American artist

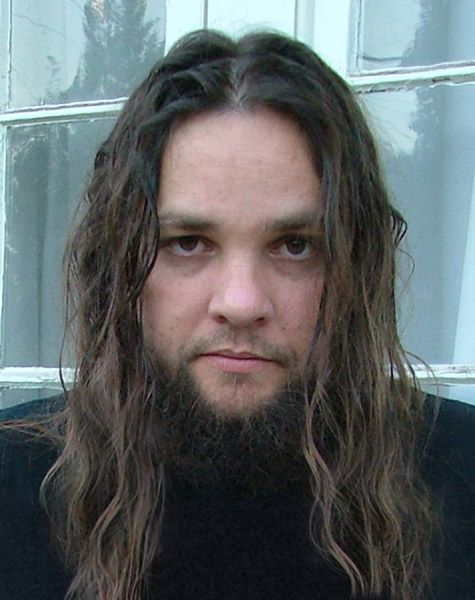
- Born: November 12, 1967 (age 58); San Pedro, California
- Known for: Digital Art / Painter
- Movement: Lowbrow / Pop Surreal

Chet Zar (born November 12, 1967, in San Pedro, California) is an American artist notable for his dark visual art, make-up effects, and digital animation. He is most widely known for his work with Tool's music and live videos. He is the stepson of American fantasy artist James Zar.

== Life ==
Zar was born in San Pedro, California. His interest in the "darker" aspects of art began as a young child, described as a "natural fascination with all things strange fostered within himself a deep connection to horror movies and dark imagery." He spent his entire childhood sculpting, drawing and painting. In high school, Zar began his work in the makeup effects industry, gaining full-time employment a year after graduating.

After years of being unimpressed with politics in the film industry, Zar took the advice of horror author Clive Barker, and decided to pursue his passion of producing original works and oil painting.

== Works ==
"Black Magick", oil on canvas

Zar's works vary according to the medium he is using. His interest in art and horror movies led to a career in the motion-picture industry. His contributions to the industry were in the form of sculpture and make-up effects. Zar designed and created prosthetic effects for such movies as The Ring, Planet of the Apes, and Darkman.

His canvassed works are generally oil-based portraits. He considers his works to be extensions of his doodles, and describes the figures in his art as "very ugly and freakish on the surface" while still retaining "innocence about them". In addition to creating digital animations for Tool's live shows, Zar has created his own DVD of digital loops, entitled Disturb the Normal. His 'animated paintings' are made using Lightwave 3D and Adobe After Effects.

On December 18, 2007, Tool released a DVD for their single "Vicarious", which contains a documentary with an appearance by Zar as a key member of the "Vicarious" video team.

On 2010, he made the album cover artwork for Charred Walls of the Damned's self-titled album.

In 2015 a documentary directed by Mike Correll examines the life and career of Chet Zar titled I Like to Paint Monsters.

== Catalogs ==
- 2012 - Black Magick: The Art of Chet Zar
- 2008 - Chet Zar - Ugly American
- 2007 - Metamorphosis
