= Central District (Delijan County) =

District in Markazi province, Iran

Central District (Delijan County) Persian: بخش مرکزی شهرستان دلیجان
- District
- Location within Iran
- Coordinates: 34°02′N 50°39′E
- Country: Iran
- Province: Markazi
- County: Delijan
- Capital: Delijan

Population (2016)
  - Total: 51,621
- Time zone: UTC+3:30 (IRST)

The Central District of Delijan County (Persian: بخش مرکزی شهرستان دلیجان) is in Markazi province, Iran. Its capital is the city of Delijan.

== Demographics ==
=== Population ===
At the time of the 2006 National Census, the district's population was 43,388 in 12,578 households. The following census in 2011 counted 48,986 people in 14,879 households. The 2016 census measured the population of the district as 51,621 inhabitants in 16,453 households.

=== Administrative divisions ===
Central District (Delijan County) Population
Administrative Divisions	2006	2011	2016
Do Dehak RD	3,332	3,871	3,494
Hastijan RD	2,518	1,969	2,021
Jasb RD	1,373	1,236	1,302
Jushaq RD (Note: Formerly Mashhad Ardehal Rural District)	1,805	1,696	1,310
Delijan (city)	31,852	37,470	40,902
Naraq (city)	2,508	2,744	2,592
Total	43,388	48,986	51,621
RD = Rural District
