= Delijan County =

County in Markazi province, Iran

Delijan County Persian: شهرستان دلیجان
- County
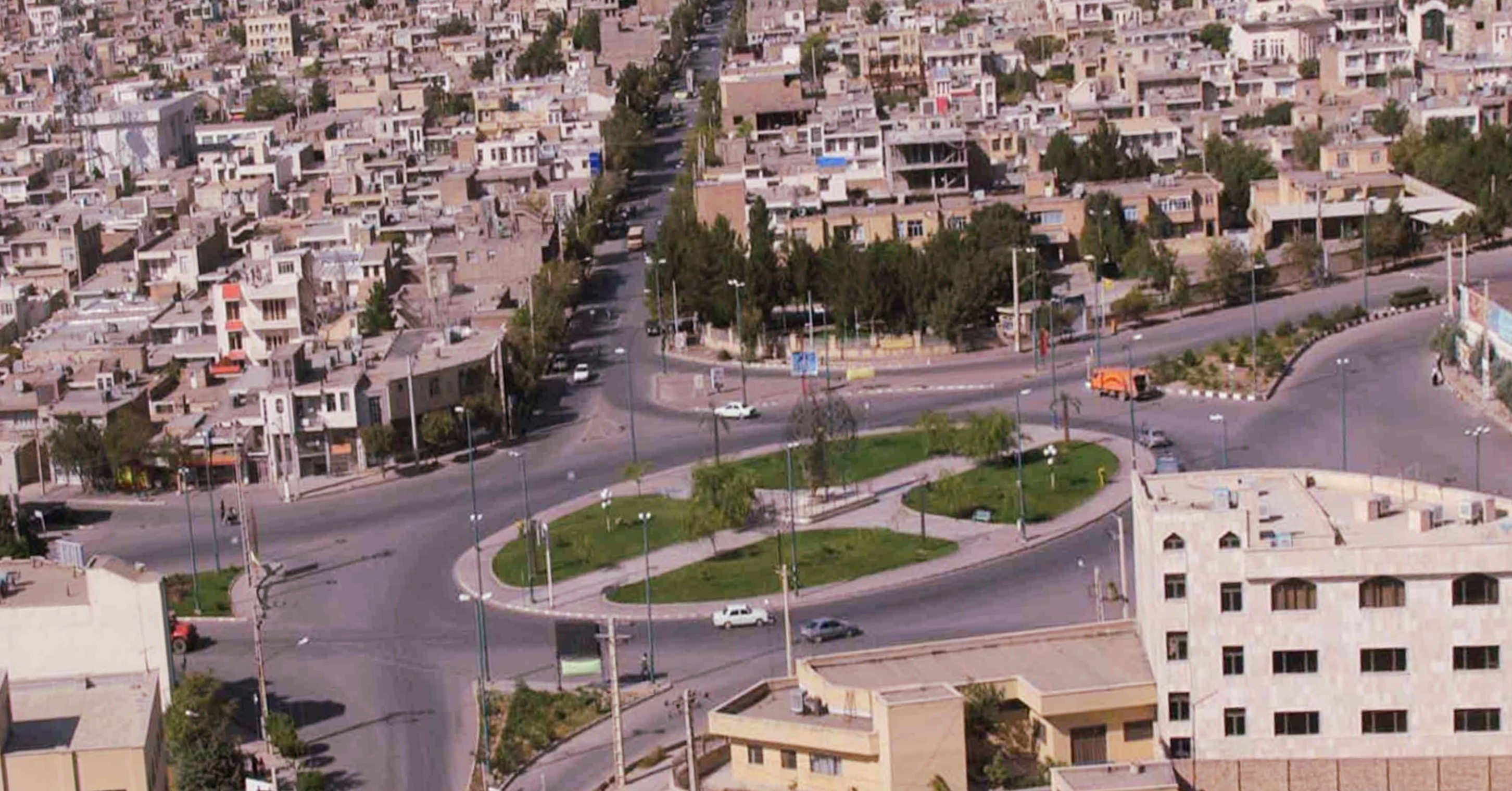
- City of Delijan

- Location of Delijan County in Markazi province (bottom right, purple)

- Location of Markazi province in Iran
- Coordinates: 34°02′N 50°39′E
- Country: Iran
- Province: Markazi
- Capital: Delijan
- Districts: Central

Population (2016)
  - Total: 51,621
- Time zone: UTC+3:30 (IRST)
- Website: www.edelijan.com

Delijan County (Persian: شهرستان دلیجان) is in Markazi province, Iran. Its capital is the city of Delijan.

== Demographics ==
=== Population ===
At the time of the 2006 National Census, the county's population was 43,388 in 12,578 households. The following census in 2011 counted 48,986 people in 14,879 households. The 2016 census measured the population of the county as 51,621 in 16,453 households.

=== Administrative divisions ===
Delijan County's population history and administrative structure over three consecutive censuses are shown in the following table.

Delijan County Population
Administrative Divisions	2006	2011	2016
Central District	43,388	48,986	51,621
Do Dehak RD	3,332	3,871	3,494
Hastijan RD	2,518	1,969	2,021
Jasb RD	1,373	1,236	1,302
Jushaq RD (Note: Formerly Mashhad Ardehal Rural District)	1,805	1,696	1,310
Delijan (city)	31,852	37,470	40,902
Naraq (city)	2,508	2,744	2,592
Total	43,388	48,986	51,621
RD = Rural District

== See also ==
Media related to Delijan County at Wikimedia Commons
