= Khatt Foundation =

Non profit foundation

- مؤسسة خط
- Formation: 2004; 22 years ago
- Founder: Huda Smitshuijzen AbiFarès
- Founded at: Amsterdam
- Purpose: advancement of Arabic typography

The Khatt Foundation (Arabic: مؤسسة خط) is a non-profit cultural foundation for the advancement of Arabic typography. It was founded in Amsterdam in 2004 by Huda Smitshuijzen AbiFarès. The organization works to further Arabic typography and design research by creating a platform for a network of designers from different backgrounds and a knowledge center for Arabic typography. The foundation also publishes books on related topics through Khatt Books.

== Name ==
The word "khatt" (خَط) means "line" in Arabic, and it is also used to refer to Arabic calligraphy.

== Organization ==
The foundation started with the goal of "modernising the image of Arabic design by making it contemporary and innovative, particularly in the field of bilingual typography," referring to typography that works with both Arabic and Latin scripts together.

One of the initiatives to this end is "Typographic Matchmaking", which pairs designers of different backgrounds together. The first of these matches, between the Slovakian type designer Peter Bilak and Lebanese type designer Kristyan Sarkis, led to the creation of the TPTQ Arabic type foundry specializing in unified Arabic-Latin fonts. One of the products of this initiative was the multiscript Qandus typeface for Latin, Arabic, and Neo-Tifinagh scripts, based on the calligraphy of Muhammad Bin Al-Qasim al-Qundusi.

In 2007, the Khatt Foundation partnered with Mediamatic to create the El Hema project, an imagined "Arabic HEMA" department store.

Its other activities include coordinating and sponsoring projects, organizing conferences and forums, and publishing books and content on Arabic typography and design.

== Khatt Books ==
Khatt Books is an independent publishing house that was established in 2010. It publishes about design and visual culture in North Africa and the Middle East and functions as a commercial arm of the Khatt Foundation. In 2014, Khatt Books published Yara Khoury Nammour's book Nasri Khattar: A Modernist Typotect about Nasri Khattar.
