= Bahia Shehab =

Lebanese artist and historian (born 1977)

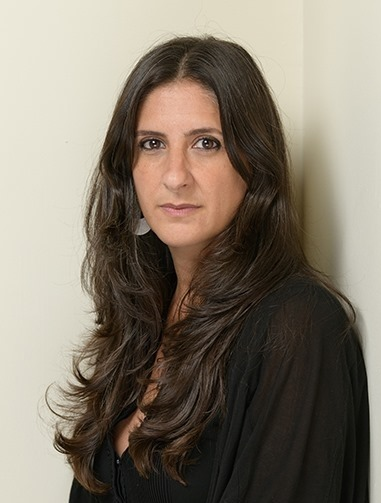
- Shehab in 2022
- Born: 1977 (age 48–49); Beirut, Lebanon
- Education: PhD, Arab Art History, Leiden University, The Netherlands (2019) MA, Islamic Art & Architecture, American University in Cairo, Egypt (2009) BGD, Graphic Design, American University of Beirut, Lebanon (1999)
- Occupations: artist, art historian, designer and scholar
- Style: political art, conceptual art, street art, revolution art
- Awards: UNESCO-Sharjah Prize for Arab Culture 2016 Prince Claus Award 2016 TED Senior Fellow 2016 BBC 100 Women 2013
- Website: bahiashehab.com

Bahia Shehab (Arabic: بهية شهاب; born 1977) is a Lebanese Egyptian multidisciplinary artist, designer, historian, creative director, educator and activist based in Cairo. Her work is concerned with identity and cultural heritage, and uses Islamic art history and in particular Islamic calligraphy and graphic design to explore contemporary Arab politics, feminist discourse and social issues.

Her culturally oriented work is concerned with using history as a means to better understand the present, and to find solutions for the future. Shehab is interested in the ways in which art can be employed for social change, and has explored this phenomenon through her artwork, which draws upon such socially charged themes as Arab identity and women's rights. Her research is largely concerned with understanding Arabic script, and much of her work explores both traditional and refashioned Arabic calligraphy.

By imbuing traditional Arabic and Islamic scripts with political messages, she has used art to explore and interrogate to understand societal situations and bring them to a larger audience. Her artwork first appeared on the walls of Cairo during the Egyptian revolution of 2011 and has since been displayed in exhibitions around the world. Shehab has received several awards for her achievements. In 2019 she was featured in the Polaris catalogue produced by Visual Collaborative, where she was interviewed alongside other artists from around the world.

== Early life and education ==
Shehab was born in 1977 in Lebanon, and grew up there. She studied graphic design at the American University of Beirut, studied for a master's degree at the American University in Cairo, and completed her PhD at Leiden University in the Netherlands.

== Educational work and research ==
Academia: The Graphic Design Program at the AUC

Shehab began teaching at the American University in Cairo in 2010, and in 2011 established the Graphic Design program at the university's Department of the Arts in the School of Humanities and Social Sciences. The program focused on the visual culture of the Arab world and encourages students to expand their awareness of Arab visual culture as they work on various design projects. Shehab encourages her students to make use of their interests while developing their work, and emphasizes the need to use design to solve problems.

She has taught over seventeen courses on design.

Conferences and Symposiums

Shehab has lectured internationally on Arab visual culture and design, design education and curriculum development, women's rights, social issues and Islamic cultural heritage.

Jury and Board Work

Bahia serves on several editorial, corporate and non-profit boards. She has served locally, regionally and internationally on international design juries, for example for the Art Directors Club of New York 101st Annual Awards.

== Art ==
=== "A Thousand Times NO" and Political Graffiti ===
In 2010, the Khatt Foundation in Amsterdam invited Bahia Shehab to produce an artwork for the exhibition "The Future of Tradition", whose purpose it was to commemorate 100 years of Islamic art in Europe after the exhibition "Masterpieces of Muhammadan Art" at the Haus der Kunst in Munich, Germany. Her project "A Thousand Times NO" was an art installation and research project that went on display in a room curated by Huda Smitshuijzen Abifares, the founder of Khatt Foundation, with other female artists from the Arab world celebrating the Arabic script. The main message was the simple "NO", in accordance with the Arabic saying, "No and a thousand times no". She sought out one thousand different designs of Arabic no's, finding them on buildings, mosques, plates, textiles, pottery and books, and from countries including Spain, China, Afghanistan and Iran - all places where Islam had thrived at one point in history or another. Her one thousand no's had originally been displayed altogether in the form of a plexiglass curtain at the Haus der Kunst exhibition. Next to this installation was a book, which was published by the Khatt Foundation, where she gathered all one thousand no's into chronological order, together with the names of the places where she came by them, the media that were originally used to write them and the patrons who were responsible for commissioning the works upon which the no's were found. While this project was a form of historical visual research, during the 25 January Revolution in 2011 in Egypt, Bahia "freed" these one thousand no's from their historical associations and gave them new meanings within the political events of the revolution, using the different styles of "no" to protest against current events. Examples include, "no to burning books", "no to a new pharaoh", “no to stripping the people” and "no to killing men of religion".

=== Landscape/Soundscape: 20 Minarets from the Arab World ===
Another project, "20 Minarets from the Arab World", is a significant cultural project that was displayed at the Arab Contemporary Louisiana Museum of Modern Art in Denmark. In this project, Shehab took the minaret, an important element of the architectural landscape in the Arab world, as her starting point, displaying 20 minarets from the Arab world while taking into consideration their proportions, beginning with the smallest minaret from Mogadishu and ending with the tallest from Abu Dhabi. She also included the minaret of the Great Mosque of Aleppo in Syria, but it appears in ruins, to represent the cultural disaster that struck in 2013 when the minaret was bombed. In this project, Shehab was concerned with how the Arab cultural heritage was being physically destroyed on one hand and, on the other, how it was being intellectually attacked by Western nations and labelled as backwards and terroristic. As part of the installation, Shehab also included the adhan (call to prayer) in the voice of a woman. Her choice was inspired by the idea that it is time for the feminine voice to rise.

=== Global Street Interventions Campaign ===
Since 2016, Shehab has been working on a global street interventions campaign that involves spray painting quotes from the Palestinian poet and author Mahmoud Darwish on the walls of streets around the world. She believes that Darwish's words are relevant to the political situation in which we find ourselves today. The quotes include, "Stand at the corner of a dream and fight" and "I had a dream that will be and a butterfly cocooned in prisons", in honour of Mahinoor Elmasry who was arrested along with countless others for standing against injustice in Egypt. Other quotes include, "No to the impossible", "We love life if we had access to it", "I will dream", "How big is the idea, how small is the state", "Those who have no land have no sea", "On this earth there are things worth living for", "One day we will be who we want to be, the journey has not started and the road has not ended", and "My people will return as air and light and water". The style with which these quotes are painted is largely abstract and geometric and uses such simple forms as circles, rectangles and triangles. Her street art has also been inspired by older Arabic scripts. Thus far, she has painted walls in Canada, France, Germany, Greece, Japan, Lebanon, the United States of America, Morocco and Norway. Her walls painted up until 2017 were published in her book At the Corner of a Dream published by Gingko library in London.

=== The Chronicles of Flowers ===
"The Chronicles of Flowers" was exhibited in Istanbul, Turkey, in 2017, documenting her personal relationship with flowers. Flowers embody for her significant connections to the women in her life, as they have given her the chance to better understand herself and her society. The exhibition used plexiglass screens, video and audio projections and flower scents, allowing the audience to enjoy a multi-sensory experience. A book, whose narrative begins with Lebanon's Civil War in the 1980s and ends in 2017 after the revolution in Egypt, also contains a documentation of 77 flowers along with their significance to the artist.

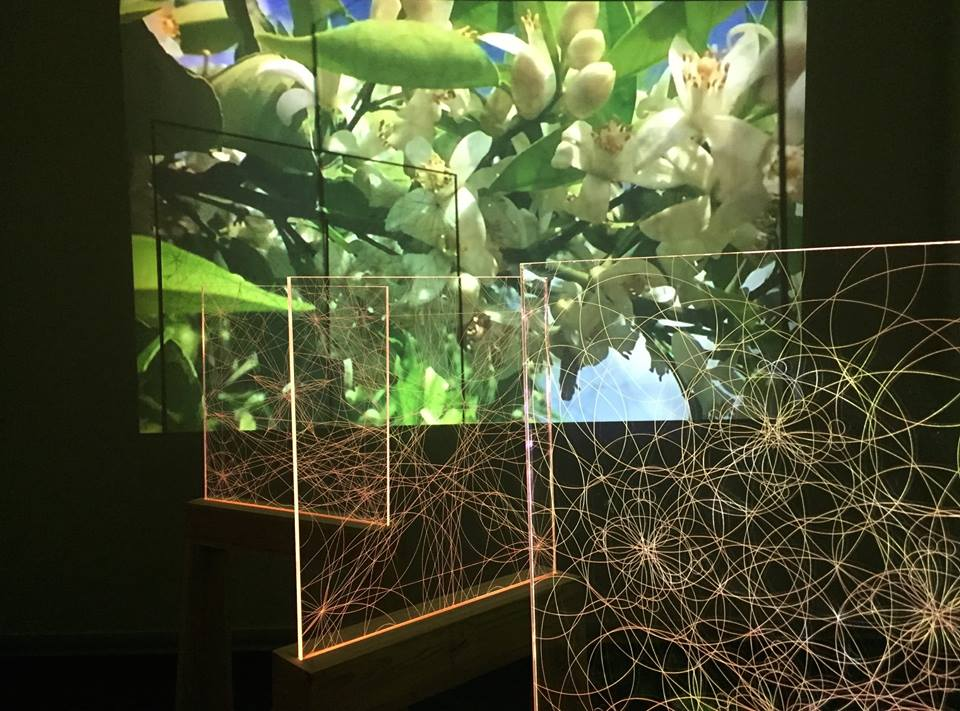
The Chronicles of Flowers

=== Reflections on Shangri La ===
In 2018, Bahia completed an artist residency at the Shangri La Museum for Islamic Art, Design & Culture in Honolulu, Hawaii. During this period, she studied Doris Duke's collection of Islamic art and used her findings as part of an exhibition, "Reflections on Shangri La", which opened on 27 September in the Arts of Islam Gallery at the Honolulu Museum of Art. A second part of her residency involved the creation of a two-part mural onsite at the Shangri La Museum. Based on a poem from the Palestinian poet Mahmoud Darwish, the stanza - depicted in an artist-created font of foliated and pixellated Kufic script, with roots instead of vegetation - is a site-specific commentary on colonized land.

== Recognition and awards ==
- Tällberg / Eliasson Global Leadership Prize Nominee 2020.
- Bellagio Residency 2019.
- Skoll fellowship 2019.
- UNESCO-Sharjah Prize for Arab Culture 2016.
- Prince Claus Award 2016.
- TED Senior Fellow 2016.
- Jameel Prize Shortlist 2016.
- Distinguished Alumna – American University of Beirut 2015.
- BBC's 100 Women list
- TED fellow 2012.

== Philosophy ==
In her artwork, Shehab has always incorporated politically charged themes. Her work is concerned with issues of current political interest, such as the civil war in Lebanon from the 1980s, the revolution that swept through Egypt in 2011, and the rights of political prisoners. An important element of her artwork is her concern for women. While this takes on a largely political scope in the sense that the concern is often with women's rights, Shehab, as a woman herself, is also concerned with the humanity of women. Through her artwork she encourages others to relate to women's lives however ordinary those lives may seem. Her concern for Arab heritage has led her to pay attention to Arab women and the current hurdles that make the attainment of women's rights a significant issue. Although led by remarkable research efforts, many of which are academic, she is able to employ much of her artwork to relate to a contemporary, non-academic audience.

== Publications ==
- Shehab, Bahia, "You Can Crush the Flowers: A Visual Memoir of the Egyptian Revolution", Gingko Library, 2021.
- Shehab, Bahia and Nawar, Haytham, "A History of Arab Graphic Design", The American University in Cairo Press, 2019.
- Shehab, Bahia, "At the Corner of a Dream: A Journey of Revolution and Resistance: The Street Art of Bahia Shehab", Gingko Library, 2019.
- Shehab, Bahia, "Emotional Translation", in Translating Dissent: Voices from and with the Egyptian Revolution, ed. Mona Baker, NY: Routledge, 2016, pp. 163–177
- Shehab, Bahia, "A Thousand Times No", in No Gods, No Masters, No Peripheries: Global Anarchisms, Barry Maxwell & Raymond Craib eds., Michigan: PM Press, 2015, pp. 233–241.
- Shehab, Bahia, A Designer's Dream: Helmi el-Touni Exhibition Catalog, Graphic Design Program at AUC, 2014.
- Shehab, Bahia, "Landscape/Soundscape: 20 Minarets from the Arab World", In World Architecture, March 2014.
- Shehab, Bahia, "Quran Lectern of Judge Zaineddine Yahya, Majordomo of Sultan Jaqmaq", in Arab Contemporary - Architecture and Identity, Michael Juul Holm & Mette Marie Kallenhauge eds. Humlebæk: Louisiana Museum of Modern Art & Rosendahls, 2014, pp. 33–34.
- Shehab, Bahia, "Spraying NO", in Walls of Freedom, Basma Hamdy & Don Karl eds. Malta: From Here to Fame, 2014, pp. 117–119.
- Shehab, Bahia, "Urban Dialogues", in Positions - Arabic World, Johannes Ebert et al. (ed.) Göttingen: Steidl-Verlag, 2013, pp. 274–278.
- Shehab, Bahia, "Faṭimid Kūfī Epigraphy on the Gates of Cairo: Between Royal Patronage and Civil Utility", in Calligraphy and Architecture in the Muslim World, Mohammad Gharipour & Irvin Cemil Schick eds. Edinburgh: Edinburgh University Press, 2013, pp. 275–289.
- Shehab, Bahia, "Voices From the Region: Cairo as Mirror," in Geography: Realms, Regions and Concepts, authors Harm J. de Blij, Peter O. Muller & Jan Nijman, USA: John Wiley & Sons, 2013, pp. 315.
- Shehab, Bahia, "GD 99: They Called Us the Harem", in Revolution/Evolution: Two Decades and Four Hundred Designers Later, Leila Musfy ed., Beirut: American University of Beirut Press, 2013, pp. 152–153.
- Shehab, Bahia, A Thousand Times No - Alif Lam-Alif: The Visual History of the Lam-Alif. Amsterdam: Khatt Books, 2011.
- Basiouny, Dalia, "Between the street and the gallery".
