= Uthman Taha Quran =

Quran Mus'haf written by calligrapher Uthman Taha

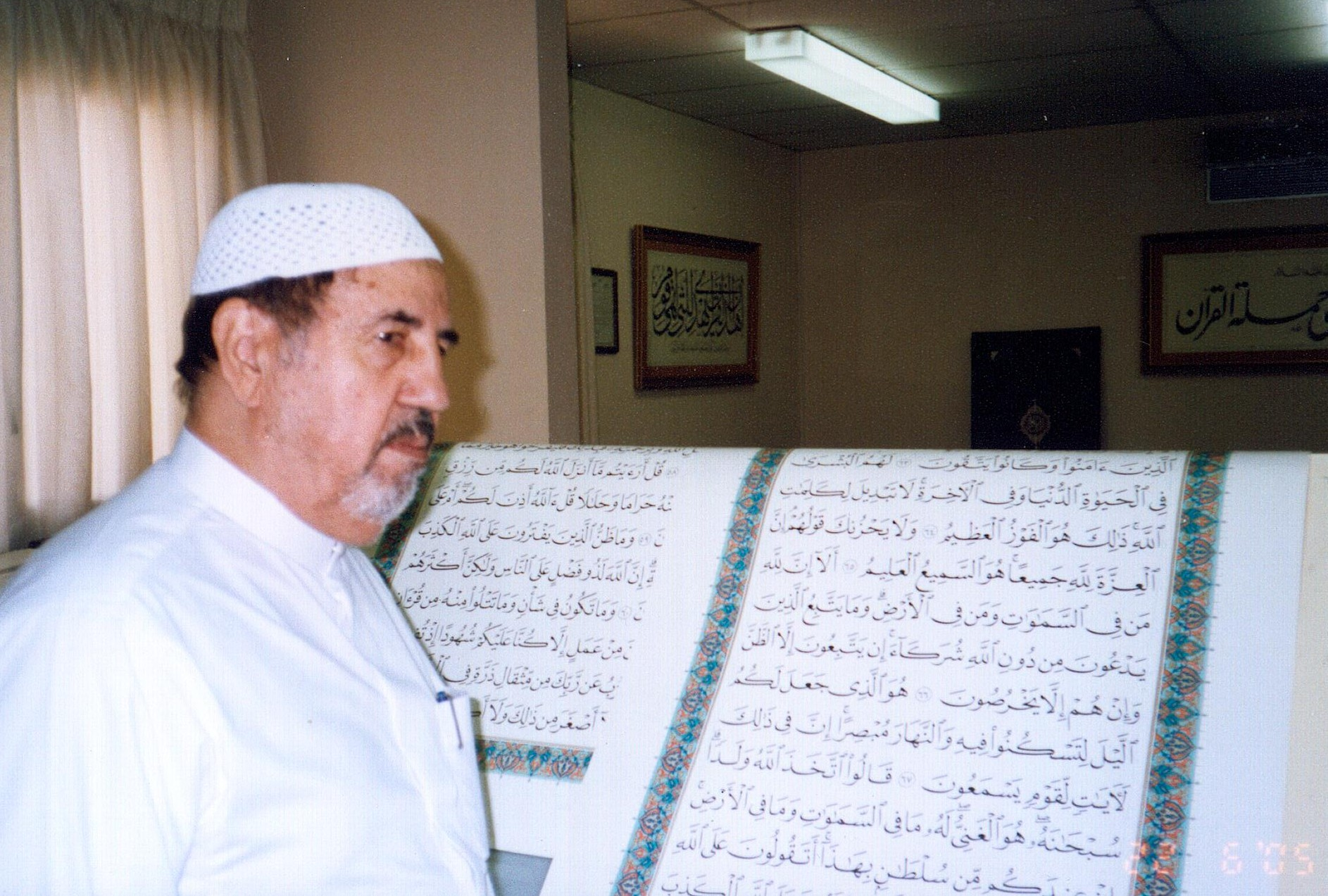
- Uthman Taha with a model of the Madinah Mus'haf, a sample of his rasm (Quran script)
- Author: Allah
- Original title: مصحف عثمان طه
- Illustrator: Uthman Taha (Calligrapher)
- Language: Arabic
- Series: Mus'haf al-Madinah
- Subject: Quran
- Genre: Religious text, Quran Mus'haf
- Media type: Print

The Uthman Taha Quran is a Mus'haf written with the Kufic script by Syrian calligrapher Uthman Taha.It is recognised for its clear and legible script and its adherence to traditional Arabic calligraphy standards. The Mus'haf was initially written according to the Warsh recitation and has since been produced in other canonical recitations. Over 200 million copies of this Mus'haf have been distributed worldwide.

== Mus'haf description ==
The transcription of this Mus'haf was carried out in accordance with the Warsh recitation, one of the principal canonical Quranic recitation (Qira'at), which is primarily practiced in North Africa.

This Mus'haf was written by Uthman Taha (born 1934) a calligrapher of the Quran associated with King Fahd Complex for the Printing of the Holy Quran in Medina, following the style of Al-Azraq (1208 – 1276 CE).

The original manuscript in Warsh method consists of 573 pages, each containing 15 lines of Quran verses. In the standardized Madani Mus'haf printed by the King Fahd Complex in Medina, the text was adapted into a 604-page format following the Hafs an Asim recitation method.

Since its publication, this Mus'haf has been widely distributed, with more than 200 million copies circulated worldwide, making it one of the most widely used and recognized Qur'anic editions globally. Additionally, the King Fahd Complex distributes millions of copies of this Mus'haf to Hajj and Umrah pilgrims annually.

== Editions ==
The owners of Al-Dar Al-Shamiya (Arabic: الدار الشامية) in Syria held the rights to print the first copy of the Quran written by Uthman Taha in 1970. This edition was printed in Damascus.

This Mus'haf was subsequently printed in Medina for the first time, after minor revisions to the initial Al-Dar Al-Shamiyya edition, under the supervision of the Quran Review Committee, which took permission to reprint from the original Syrian printing press.

In 1415 AH (1994 CE), the African Mus'haf (Arabic: مصحف إفريقيا) printing press issued a Quran Mushaf that spread across the African continent. This edition featured Uthman Taha's calligraphy and closely followed the first copy printed by Al-Dar Al-Shamiya in Syria.

The State of Kuwait also issued the Kuwait Quran, based on the African Mus'haf edition, presented in a high quality edition, with some minor adjustments to some control marks to align with regional preferences and standards.

== See also ==
- Ten recitations
