= Zilla Slab =

Slab serif typeface commissioned by the Mozilla Foundation

- Category: Slab serif
- Classification: Mechanistic, Humanist
- Designers: Peter Biľak, Nikola Djurek
- Commissioned by: Mozilla Foundation
- Foundry: Typotheque
- Date created: 2017
- License: SIL Open Font License
- Design based on: Tesla Slab
- Variations: Zilla Slab Highlight
- Website: github.com/mozilla/zilla-slab
- Latest release version: 1.002
- Latest release date: August 23, 2017; 8 years ago

Zilla Slab is a free to use, open source slab serif font commissioned by the Mozilla Foundation as a part of their rebranding process from mid-2016 to 2017. It was created in 2017 by Peter Biľak and Nikola Djurek, typeface designers for the Typotheque foundry. It is inspired by the Tesla Slab font, also originally designed by Typotheque. Its variant, Zilla Slab Highlight, features a unique ligature in its bold weight, where the character sequence "mozilla" will turn into "moz://a", purposely intended for using the stylized Mozilla wordmark.

== Usage ==
Zilla Slab is used as the branding font for Mozilla Foundation, featured in its logo as well as their other products and projects, such as MDN Web Docs and Common Voice, alongside Inter and Metropolis.

As of February 21, 2018, Ohio University started using Zilla Slab as their secondary font of choice.

== Availability ==
Zilla Slab is available on GitHub, Google Fonts, and through Mozilla's CDN. Its variant, Zilla Slab Highlight, is also sourced in the same GitHub repository, and available on Google Fonts as well.

== See also ==
- Fira typeface by Mozilla
