= Huda Smitshuijzen AbiFarès =

Lebanese typographer, writer, researcher

Dr. Huda Smitshuijzen AbiFarès
- هدى سميتسهوزن أبي فارس
- Born: 1965 (age 60–61); Beirut
- Occupations: Typographer, writer, researcher, graphic designer, lecturer, and design consultant
- Organization: Khatt Foundation
- Known for: Arabic typography
- Notable work: Arabic Typography: a comprehensive sourcebook

Huda Smitshuijzen AbiFarès (Arabic: هدى سميتسهوزن أبي فارس) is a Lebanese typographer, writer, researcher, graphic designer, lecturer, and design consultant from Beirut. She is the founder and director of the Khatt Foundation. As a designer and researcher, she specializes in Arabic and multilingual typography.

== Biography ==
AbiFarès was born in Beirut in 1965. She studied in the United States, earning a Bachelor of Fine Arts degree in graphic design from Rhode Island School of Design in 1987, and a Master of Fine Arts degree from Yale University in 1990.

When working as an assistant professor of graphic design at the American University of Beirut, she determined that the literature necessary to teach her students about Arabic script, calligraphy, and typography had not yet been written. In 2001, she published Arabic Typography, in which she examined Arabic typography from a structural and theoretical point of view. She also taught visual communication at the American University in Dubai and served as the department's chair for 3 years.

She founded the non-profit Khatt Foundation for the advancement of Arabic typography in Amsterdam in 2004. In 2016, she became a member of Alliance Graphique Internationale. She earned a PhD in Middle Eastern studies from Leiden University in 2017.

AbiFarès resides in the Netherlands.

== Publications ==
- Arabic Typography: a comprehensive sourcebook (Saqi Books, London, 2001)
- Experimental Arabic Type (Saatchi & Saatchi, Dubai, 2002)
- Typographic Matchmaking (BIS Publishers, Amsterdam 2007)
- Typographic Matchmaking in the City (Khatt Books, Amsterdam 2011)
- Arabic Type Design for Beginners (Khatt Books, Amsterdam 2013)
- with Nagla Samir, Mouneer Al-Shaarani, Against the Grain: Exploring the Scope of the Arabic Letter. Amsterdam, Khatt Books, 2023, ISBN 978-94-90939-29-8 (e-book, with preview)

== See also ==
- Arabic calligraphy
- Mouneer Al-Shaarani
