= Mouneer Al-Shaarani =

Syrian calligraphic artist

Mouneer Al-Shaarani منير الشعراني
- Born: September 16, 1952 (age 74); Salamiyah, Syria
- Known for: Graphic arts, Arabic calligraphy
- Website: Mouneer Al-Shaarani on Facebook

Mouneer Al-Shaarani (Arabic: منير الشعراني; born September 6, 1952) is a Syrian graphic artist specialized in Arabic calligraphy. Al-Shaarani is known as calligrapher, graphic designer and writer about Arabic calligraphy and Arab Islamic art. He has designed several Arabic typefaces for book covers or other graphic creations. His work has been exhibited in several Arab countries, Malaysia, Europe, Australia and the United States and is internationally present in collections of contemporary Arabic art. Between 1985 and 2007, he lived and worked in Cairo, Egypt, and later returned to live in Damascus.

== Artistic profile ==
From the age of 10, Al-Shaarani studied the art of Arabic calligraphy under the Syrian calligrapher Muḥammad Badawi Al-Dirany, and until his graduation in 1977, he studied Fine Arts at Damascus University.

Based on his command of traditional Arabic calligraphy, Al-Shaarani has been using historical calligraphic styles, such as Kairouan Kufic, Square Kufic, Thuluth or Maghrebi script, and at the same time, developed and modernized the shapes of drawing Arabic letters and typeface design according to his personal, modern style. Choosing his texts both from Islamic, as well as from Christian religious sources, but mainly from Arab philosophers or Sufi poets, such as Ibn Arabi, Al-Mutanabbi, or Ibn Sina, he conveys non-religious, but universal messages. An example is this quote from the Lebanese-American poet Khalil Gibran "The whole earth is my homeland and the human family my clan."

Apart from historical quotes, he sometimes also expresses his own contemporary messages, such as in his work entitled There is no creativity where there is no freedom and in his graphic images starting with the message NO TO... "No to killing, no to prison, no to intimidation, no to humiliation, no to hypocrisy, no to oppression, no to violence, no to fear, no to falsehood, no to terrorism, no to corruption."

Another important aspect of Al-Shaarani's artistic work is his view that "Arabic calligraphy has nothing to do with religion. It is the result of a civilization and not a religion. Religion benefited from calligraphy and not the other way round. The development of Arabic script was not initiated by religion, but by the state of the Umayyads. Second, calligraphy is an art. It has no finality or climax. The Arabic script has no “sacred” status for me."

Among his other calligraphic work, Al-Shaarani created the logo for the Syrian group for Arabic classical music, called Takht al-nagham in New York City.

After the fall of the Assad regime, Shaarani exhibited his recent works in Damascus in March 2025.

== Critical reception ==
In 2016, digital media platform Mashable published several of Al-Shaarani's graphic works, expressing his artistic statements about his war-torn country, including comments on his poetic and philosophical messages.

The master calligrapher, who has evolved the ancient Arabic tradition from its religious roots, is creating deeply intellectual work that reflects his interest in modern poetry and literature, alongside Christian and Sufi philosophy.

— Ariel Bogle, Syrian artist's stunning calligraphy captures the hope of a war torn country

In the 2020 historical overview A History of Arab Graphic Design by Egyptian art historians Bahia Shehab and Haytham Nawar, Al-Shaarani is credited for his invention of new Arabic calligraphic styles and his calligraphic work for book covers, logos, and typeface design. In 2023, Lebanese writer Huda Smitshuijzen AbiFarès co-published a monograph both in Arabic and English titled Mouneer Al-Shaarani, Against the Grain: Exploring the Scope of the Arabic Letter. Apart from chapters about his personal creations developing Arabic calligraphy into a modern graphic art, the book features several of his book covers and information on his political engagement.

Al-Shaarani's graphic art has been featured in Arabic and international news media and exhibited in several Arab countries, Malaysia, Europe, Australia and the United States. His biography and work By their fruits, you shall know them were included in the British Museum's 2006 exhibition and catalogue Word into Art. Artists of the Modern Middle East. It is also internationally present in public and private collections of contemporary Arabic art.

== Major exhibitions ==
- Rietberg Museum, Zurich, Switzerland (1998)
- Shawqi Museum, Cairo (1998)
- Sharjah Art Museum, UAE (2001)
- Gezira Art Center, Cairo (2006)
- Word into Art, The British Museum, London, UK (2006)
- Sharjah Biennial 11, UAE (2013)
- Europia Gallery, Paris, France (2016)
- Khan al-Maghrebi, Cairo (2022)

== See also ==
- Arabic calligraphy

== Literature ==
- Bahia Shehab and Haytham Nawar, A History of Arab Graphic Design. Cairo, Egypt: American University in Cairo Press, 2020, ISBN 9781649031952
- Huda Smitshuijzen AbiFarès and Nagla Samir, Mouneer Al-Shaarani, Against the Grain: Exploring the Scope of the Arabic Letter. Amsterdam, The Netherlands: Khatt Books, 2023, ISBN 978-94-90939-29-8 (e-book, with preview)
