= Kristyan Sarkis =

Lebanese type designer

- كريستيان سركيس
- Born: 18 June 1985 (age 41); Beirut, Lebanon
- Education: Royal Academy of Art, The Hague
- Known for: Type designer, Lettering, Arabic typography
- Notable work: Kanun, Mizan, Greta Text Arabic, Louvre Abu Dhabi Arabic
- Website: https://kristyan-sarkis.com/

Kristyan Sarkis (Arabic: كريستيان سركيس; born 18 June 1985) is a Lebanese type designer and lettering artist based in Amsterdam. He is known for his work in contemporary Arabic type design and for co-founding several initiatives dedicated to Arabic typography and design education.

== Early life and education ==
Sarkis was born in Beirut, Lebanon, in 1985. He earned a Bachelor of Arts in Graphic Design, where his interest in type design developed under the mentorship of designer Yara Khoury. After graduation, he worked at AlMohtaraf Studio, where he completed his first type design project.

Sarkis obtained a Master of Design in Type & Media from the Royal Academy of Art (KABK) in The Hague, graduating in 2010.

== Career ==
Sarkis works as an independent type designer in Amsterdam, focusing on Arabic type design and lettering. His work combines traditional Arabic calligraphic principles with contemporary typographic approaches.

He is a co-founder and partner in several initiatives dedicated to Arabic type design:

- TPTQ Arabic, a type foundry and design studio co-founded with Peter Biľak in 2015 and specialising in Arabic fonts.
- Arabic Type Design — Beirut, is described as the first international educational program dedicated to Arabic type design, co-founded with Lara Captan.
- Arabic Lettering Workshops, is a traveling workshop about Arabic lettering, co-founded by Khajag Apelian, Wael Morcos, and Kristyan Sarkis, that has held 21 sessions to date.

Sarkis has collaborated with international cultural and technology institutions, including MoMA, Mozilla, and the Louvre. He has also completed projects for or with Typotheque, HW/Ateliers Jean Nouvel, Philippe Apeloig, Research Studios UK, Dalton Maag, Interbrand Singapore, and other design studios. He frequently collaborates with Typotheque and has written articles on Arabic typography for the foundry.

== Typefaces and projects ==
Sarkis’s notable typefaces and type systems include Thuraya, Greta Text Arabic (with Peter Biľak), and Colvert Arabic (for typographies.fr). His projects also include the Arabic typeface for the visual identity and signage system of the Louvre Abu Dhabi (2017), developed in collaboration with Philippe Apeloig and Ateliers Jean Nouvel. He has additionally worked with Lineto on the Arabic version of the LL Unica77 type family.

=== Design approach ===
Two of Sarkis’s type families reflect his typographic and historical research:

- Qandus, a system that explores the development of early solid Arabic styles from Eastern Kufic to Western (Maghribi) forms.
- Mizan, a system examining hierarchy in Arabic manuscripts and typography.

Sarkis distinguishes type design from lettering, noting that type design requires system-based thinking, consistency, and reproducibility across a wide range of contexts, while lettering may serve a single design situation.

=== Classification of Arabic script ===
In his writing and teaching, Sarkis classifies Arabic script into two broad categories:

1. Solid scripts (such as Kufic), which emphasize geometric structure.
2. Fluid scripts (such as Naskh and Diwani), which emphasize calligraphic expressiveness.

== Teaching and lectures ==
Sarkis teaches and lectures internationally. He has taught at the Royal Academy of Art (KABK) Type & Media Master Program, the Lebanese American University (LAU) in Beirut, ESAV Marrakech, and Virginia Commonwealth University in Qatar. He also regularly conducts workshops and lectures on Arabic lettering and typography.

== Awards ==
Sarkis’s work has received several awards, including the New York Type Directors Club Certificate of Typographic Excellence, the ATypI Letter.2 award, and the European Design Award.
