= Uthman Taha =

Syrian-Saudi calligrapher

- عثمان طه
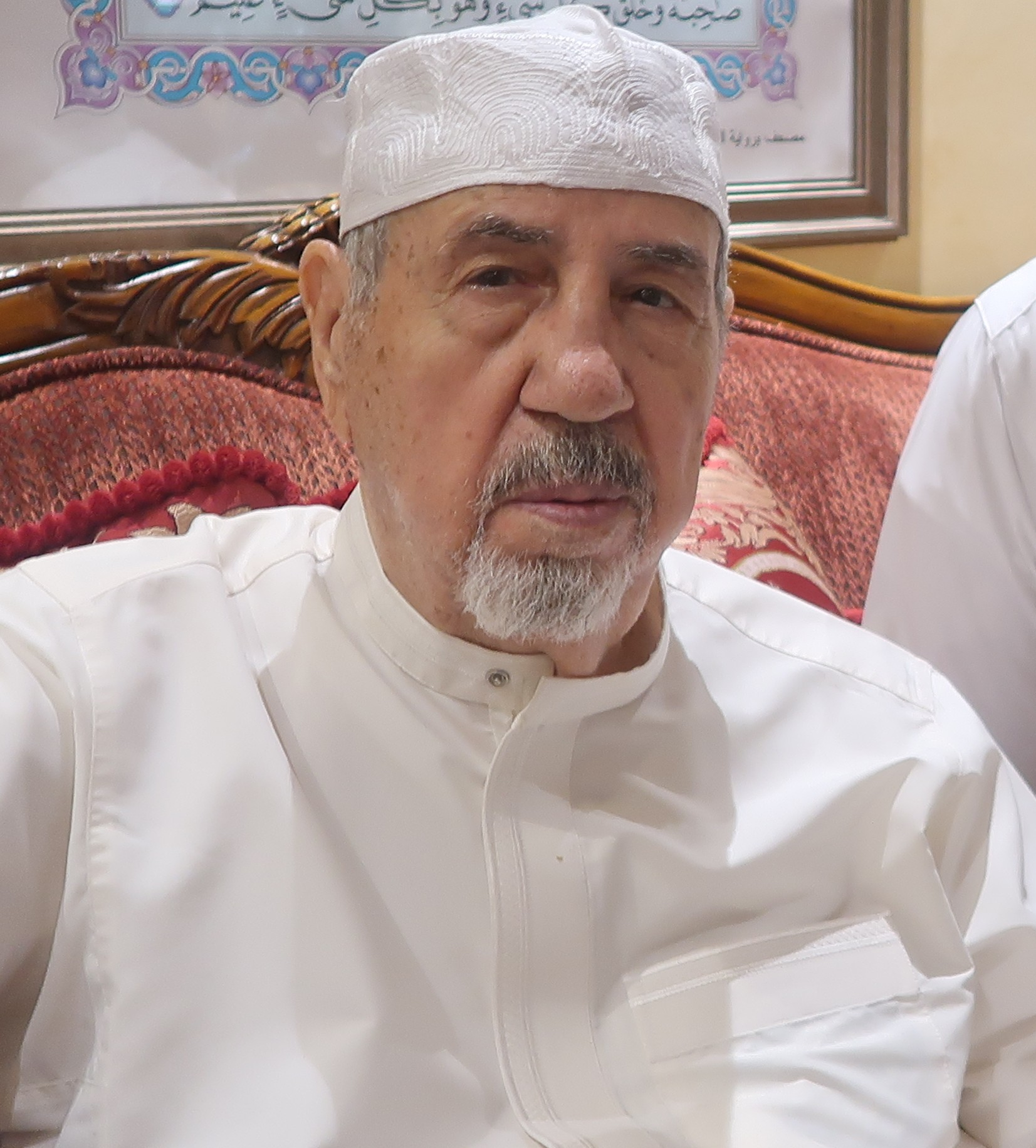
- Uthman Taha in 2021
- Born: 1934 (age 91–92); Aleppo, Syria
- Occupations: Uthman Taha Quran, Calligrapher of The Quran in the Arabic language
- Parent: Abdou Taha Hussein

Uthman ibn Abduh ibn Husayn ibn Taha al-Halyabi (or Uthman Taha, Arabic: عثمان طه) is a Syrian-Saudi calligrapher of the Quran in the Arabic language renowned for hand-writing Mushaf al-Madinah issued by the King Fahd Complex for the Printing of the Holy Qur'an.

He was born in 1934 in Sandi, Çobanbey a rural area of Aleppo Governorate, Syria. Gaining a BA in Shari’ah from the University of Damascus, he also studied Arabic language, Islamic decoration arts, and painting. He gained certification (Turkish icazet) in calligraphy from Hamid al-Amidi, the so-called master of calligraphers in the Islamic world. He was also taught calligraphy by Muhammad Ali al-Mawlawi, Ibrahim al-Rifa’i (Aleppo), Muhammad Badawi al-Derani (Damascus) and Hashim al-Baghdadi.

He wrote his first Mushaf (written copy of the Qur’an) in 1970. In 1988 he travelled to Saudi Arabia and was assigned a handwriter and calligrapher in the King Fahd Complex for the Printing of the Holy Qur'an in Madina. The same year he was made a member of the international jury for the Arabic Calligraphy Award which is held in Istanbul once every three years.

During the first 18 years of his life at the King Fahd Complex, Uthman hand-wrote four Mus'haf, more than 200 million copies of which were distributed worldwide. As of 2020, he has hand-written 12 Maṣāḥif. A Muṣḥaf usually requires more than 3 years in writing and an additional year for proof-reading and reviewing.

His beautiful, clear, easy-to-read style used in the Madina Muṣḥaf is also used in a commercial copy known as Mushaf al-Tajweed.

== King Fahd Complex and the Medina Qur'an ==
In 1988 Taha was brought to Saudi Arabia and appointed a calligrapher at the King Fahd Complex for the Printing of the Holy Qur'an in Medina. In an interview with Al-Ahram, he stated that the Complex had first examined a Qur'an he had written in Syria, approved its script after review and modifications, and then invited him to work as a calligrapher for the Medina editions.

He was granted Saudi citizenship in December 2021.

== See also ==
- Arabic calligraphy
- Naskh (script)
- King Fahd Complex for the Printing of the Holy Qur'an
- Cairo edition
