= Bilak =

Biľak, Bilák or Bilak is a Slavic surname derived from a nickname for a parson of pale complexion or fair/blond hair.

- Izidor Bilak (1889–1944), Carpatho-Rusyn poet, folklorist
- Orest Bilak (1926–2021), Ukrainian World War II veteran
- Peter Biľak (born 1973), Slovak graphic designer
- Vasiľ Biľak (1917–2014), Slovak communist leader

== See also ==
- Bilak, the Hungarian name for Domnești village, Mărișelu Commune, Bistrița-Năsăud County, Romania
