= Lukáš Timulak =

Lukáš Timulak (born 9 May 1979) is a Slovak dancer and choreographer, working in the Netherlands.

== Early life and education ==
Lukáš Timulak studied at the Dance Conservatory in Bratislava (Slovakia) and Academie de Danse Classique Princesse Grace in Monaco.

== Career ==
In 1997 he joined Les Ballets de Monte Carlo where he danced for three years under Jean-Christophe Maillot. From 2000 to 2010, he danced at the Dutch contemporary dance company Nederlands Dans Theater in The Hague, where from 2002 he was one of the leading dancers. At the NDT he worked on new ballet creations by choreographers like Jiří Kylián, Wiliam Forsythe, Mats Ek, Paul Lightfoot & Sol Leon, Hans van Manen, Ohad Naharin, Crystal Pite among others.

From 2001 he started choreographing. Most of his works since 2004 are in collaboration with designer Peter Bilak, who co-authors the concepts of the dance performances. Together they were subject of an exhibition ‘InLoop/EnTry’ in Stroom, Centre for Art and Architecture.

In 2010, he collaborated with Ruben van Leer on ‘Instrument’, a short dance movie which premiered during Cinedans festival in Amstardam. In 2011, he choreographed popular iPhone/iPad app Dance Writer.

== Works ==
- 2011: ‘A Place Between’, Dantzaz Konpainia
- 2011: ‘Masculine/Feminine’, Nederlands Dans Theater 2
- 2010: ‘Eroica, Gothenburg Ballet
- 2009: ‘Urtanz, TODAYSART
- 2008: ‘Real Time’, Slovak National Theater
- 2008: ‘Offspring’, Nederlands Dans Theater 2
- 2007: ‘Bodily writing’, C-Scope, Regentes Theater, The Hague
- 2007: ‘Oneness’, Nederlands Dans Theater 2
- 2006: ‘I SAW I WAS I’, NDT 1, UpComing Choreographers
- 2005: ‘Due a Due’, C-Scope, Regentes Theater, The Hague
- 2005: ‘Twenty’, NDT 1, UpComing Choreographers
- 2004: ‘Dear Reader’, C-Scope, Regentes Theater, The Hague

=== Personal ===
Lukáš is married to Italian ballet dancer Valentina Scaglia.
