= Shafiq-Uz-Zaman Khan =

Pakistani calligrapher

- Born: Shafiq-Uz-Zaman Khan; 2 November 1956 (age 69); Rawalpindi, Pakistan
- Known for: Calligraphy, Khat-e-Sulas Thuluth
- Movement: Islamic calligraphy

Ustad Shafiq-Uz-Zaman Khan (Urdu استاد شفیق الزماں خان) is a Pakistani calligrapher and head of restoring art at Masjid an-Nabawi, the second holiest site of Muslims in the world. He was born in Rawalpindi on 2 November 1956 and grew up in Karachi, Pakistan.

He is inspired by famous Turkish calligrapher Hamid Aytaç. He is known for work in the Arabic calligraphy styles of Khat-e-Sulas and Thuluth.

The Basmala in an 18th-century Islamic calligraphy from the Ottoman region, Thuluth script

== Awards ==
- First prize in the First International Arabic Calligraphy Competition 2012

Shafiq-Uz-Zaman Khan won first prize in the First International Arabic Calligraphy Competition organized in Makkah.

- Presidential Pride of Performance (Urdu: تمغہِ حسنِ کارکردگی) in Pakistan in 2014.
