= King Fahd Glorious Quran Printing Complex =

Saudi publisher

- مجمع الملك فهد لطباعة المصحف الشريف
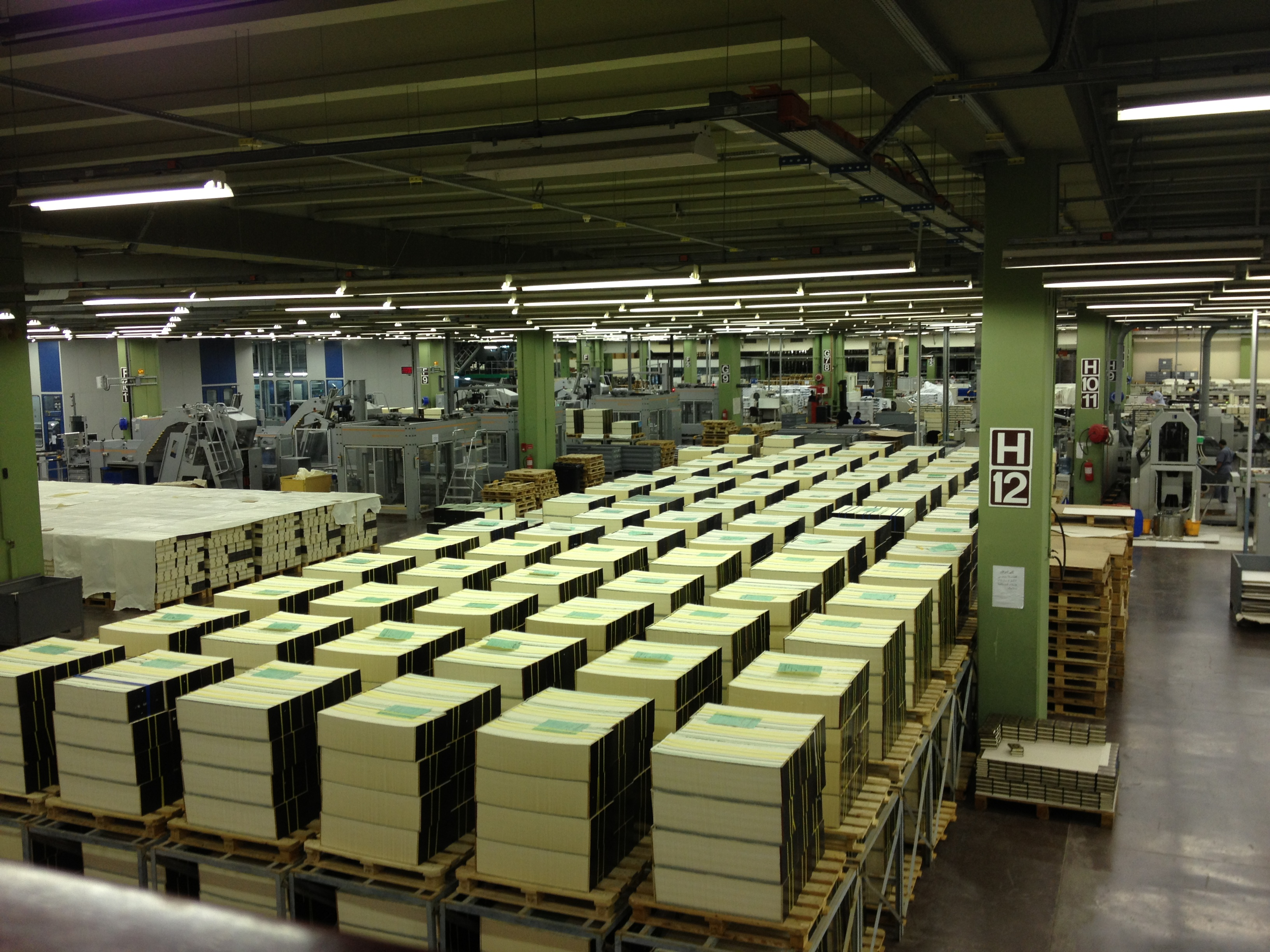
- Formation: 1985
- Purpose: Printing of the Quran
- Headquarters: Medina
- Location: Saudi Arabia
- Coordinates: 24°30′59″N 39°32′29″E
- General Secretary: Dr. Bandar bin Fahd Al-Suwailem
- Head: Saleh Al Sheikh
- Website: qurancomplex.gov.sa

King Fahd Glorious Quran Printing Complex (KFGQPC; Arabic: مجمع الملك فهد لطباعة المصحف الشريف) is a printing plant located in Medina, Saudi Arabia that publishes the Quran in Arabic and other languages.

The company produces about 10 million copies a year. It has 1,700 employees. It has published 55 different translations of the Qur'an in 39 languages. Its website offers the Arabic Qur'an text itself, recitations, textual search, translations, images of early Qur'an manuscripts, and exegetic commentaries. Since 1985, The Complex made over 128 million copies of the Qur'an, which is widely used by all sects of Islam. The original copy was written by calligrapher Uthman Taha.

== Production ==
From 1985, its opening year, until 2007

	Type	Amount
1	Qur'an Kareem	127,420,423
2	Audio tapes	1,817,129
3	Translations	24,624,813
4	Parts of Qur'an	47,592,277
5	Prophet's traditions books	210,000
6	Others	4,668,941
	Total	206,333,583

The complex produces The Noble Quran, which is made freely available and is among the most widely read Quran translations in the world. Both the translation and associated contents have been criticised.

== Distribution of collector versions ==
The complex began distributing its versions of the Qur’an, recordings, parts, the Yaseen quarter, the last ten days, translations, and books since 1405 AH, and this is done to Muslims inside and outside the Kingdom around the world, and the quantities distributed amounted to hundreds of millions.

== See also ==
- List of things named after Saudi kings
- Uthman Taha
