= Stuart Bertolotti-Bailey =

British graphic designer

Stuart Bertolotti-Bailey (previously Stuart Bailey; born 1973) is a British graphic designer, writer and editor. In 2000 he co-founded the bi-annual arts journal Dot Dot Dot with Peter Bil'ak. In 2006 he began working with American graphic designer, writer and editor David Reinfurt under the pseudonym Dexter Sinister, which is also the name of their 'just-in-time workshop and occasional bookstore' on New York's Lower East Side. Reinfurt replaced Bil'ak as co-editor of Dot Dot Dot the same year; it continued under Bailey and Reinfurt's direction until the final, 20th issue in 2010 before being replaced by Bulletins of the Serving Library, co-edited by Bailey and Reinfurt together with American artist and writer Angie Keefer until 2017. The journal has since morphed into a non-profit organization that variously serves as a publishing platform, a seminar room, a collection of framed objects, and an event space. The Serving Library Annual is co-edited by Stuart Bertolotti-Bailey, Italian curator and editor Francesca Bertolotti-Bailey, David Reinfurt, and Italian writer and translator Vincenzo Latronico, and published by Roma Publications], Amsterdam. Since 2017 he has held the position of Head of Design at the Institute of Contemporary Arts in London, where he lives.

== Education ==
Bertolotti-Bailey studied Typography & Graphic Communication at the University of Reading, and was one of the first participants to study at the Werkplaats Typografie, a postgraduate program co-founded by Dutch graphic designers Wigger Bierma and Karel Martens in Arnhem, The Netherlands. In 2015 he received a PhD from the Fine Art Department of the University of Reading with a thesis titled Work in Progress: Form as a Way of Thinking.
