= Abu Saymeh =

Muslim calligrapher

Yasser Abu Saymeh is a Muslim calligrapher who earned worldwide fame when he was selected by Victor Batarseh, the Christian mayor of Bethlehem on the West Bank, to copy out in Arabic script the Gospel of Luke from the New Testament of the Christian Bible for presentation to the Catholic Pope Benedict XVI. On April 27, 2009, The Washington Post reported that he had "nearly completed the Gospel's text, which will eventually cover 65 poster-sized pages." It was set to be accompanied by coloured images depicting the life of Jesus Christ from his nativity through to his crucifixion.

Trained in Baghdad, Saymeh works in a small Bethlehem studio only a few hundred metres from the Church of the Nativity. He opens it every morning after prayers at dawn at a local mosque, and its walls are adorned with Arabic poetry and verses from the Koran. According to The Post's Dalia Nammari, "Writing tools are laid out on an old table, including two dozen calligraphy pens and black, green, and red ink." His work on Luke is examined by a local priest every few days to ensure accuracy. The Pope is set to receive Saymeh's work, bound in deerskin and presented in a mother-of-pearl box, on May 13, during his visit to Bethlehem as part of a pilgrimage including Nazareth and Jerusalem.

Saymeh was a quick and natural choice for the task, having earned distinction in 2007 for a handwritten copy of the Koran presented to Palestinian President Mahmoud Abbas to mark the Muslim holy month of Ramadan. Batarseh said he chose him both for his talent and to send out a message of "peaceful religious coexistence". For his part, Saymeh claimed to have accepted the assignment in a bid "to send a conciliatory message and distance himself from extremists." "I would like this," he said, "to be a message from a Muslim artist through this simple work that the Muslim artist is tolerant and not aggressive, despite abuses that may come from here and there from extremists who use our religion for their own interests."

Raised in a Palestinian refugee camp in Jordan, Saymeh kicked off his career by drawing signs for a peaceful demonstration against Israeli occupation. He currently also teaches at a local university and is frequently summoned to court for fraud cases as a handwriting expert.

== See also ==
- Islamic calligraphy
- Jesus
- Nativity of Jesus in art
- Nativity of Jesus in later culture
- Death and resurrection of Jesus
