= Everitte Barbee =

American Arabic calligrapher and artist

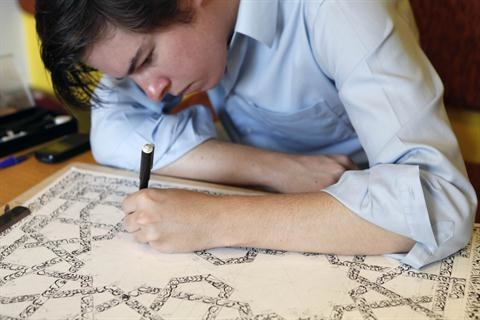
- Arabic Calligrapher Everitte Barbee at an Exhibition
- Born: December 23, 1988 (age 37); Nashville, Tennessee
- Education: The University of Edinburgh
- Notable work: Contemporary Arabic Calligraphy
- Website: everitte.org

Everitte Barbee (born 1988) is an American Arabic Calligrapher known for works that incorporate religious, literary and pop culture messages. His works juxtapose traditional Arabic scripts with modern imagery to convey strong political messages. All of his works currently incorporate the Diwani Jali script.

== Biography ==
Everitte was born in Nashville, Tennessee and attended the Montgomery Bell Academy. Everitte later graduated from the University of Edinburgh in Scotland with a Masters in International Business and Arabic. During a semester abroad in 2009, he started learning Arabic Calligraphy from the master calligrapher Adnan Farid. He moved to Beirut to continue developing his skills, learning more about Arabic Calligraphy, as well as improving his Arabic in 2010.

== Career ==
Everitte started working on the "Quran for Solidarity" project as a way to improve his calligraphy skills. He began writing Surahs from the Quran in geometric shapes as a way to practice the art. Following the controversy surrounding the construction and operation of the Islamic Center of Murfreesboro, Barbee was inspired to expand his project and develop one piece for each Surah of the Quran, as a way of creating appreciation for the Quran among his peers in the west.

== Exhibitions ==
- 2012 - "Maktoob", Art Lounge, Beiteddine
- 2013 - The Beirut Bloom: Contemporary Art Fair, Beirut, Lebanon
- 2013 - Beirut Art Book Fair, Beirut, Lebanon
- 2014 - Eternity, for Now; Al Riwaq Art Space, Bahrain
- 2014 - AltCity, Beirut, Lebanon
- 2017 - Hafez Gallery, Jeddah, Saudi Arabia
- 2019 - US Consulate, UAE
