= Omar El-Nagdi =

Egyptian painter (1931–2019)

- Born: 1931; Cairo, Egypt
- Died: 2019 (aged 87–88)
- Education: Helwan University
- Occupation: Painter

Omar El-Nagdi (1931-2019) was an Egyptian abstract expressionist and cubist painter. On March 16, 2016, his 1992 painting Sarajevo was sold for $1,145,000. He attended and graduated from the Faculty of Fine Arts in the year 1953 which is now part of the Helwan University. He was part of the Liberal Artist’s group.
