= Hamid Aytaç =

Islamic calligrapher

Hamid Aytaç (pronounced Aytach) (b. 1891, Diyarbakır – d. 18 May 1982) was an Islamic calligrapher born during Ottoman times. In his later life, he was acknowledged as the Islamic world's leading calligrapher and was one of the last of the classical calligraphers.

== Life and career ==
Born Sheikh Musa Azmi, in 1891 in Diyarbakır, his paternal great-grandfather was the calligrapher Adem-i Amidi. In international circles, he is also known as Hamid Al Amidi. Some of his works may be found to be signed as Azmi. He is known by the pseudonym Hamid.

Hamid learned the jali-thuluth (Turkish: celi-sülüs) style from Mehmed Nazif (1846–1913), the naskh and thuluth styles from Kamil Akdik (1862–1941) and the ta'liq style from Mehmed Hulusi (1869–1940). He was one of the final links in the strict master-student system that had been in operation in an unbroken line for 500 years.

He worked at the Harb School, for the Customs House in Istanbul and he briefly worked for the German Map Department in Berlin. Following the war, he opened his own commercial studio in Istanbul which he After the named Hattat Hamid Yazıevi. He was the first calligrapher to bring the techniques of engraving, embossing and luxury printing to the Turkish printing press.

In the tradition of the great calligrapher Ali bin Hilal known as Ibn al-Bawwab, Aytaç was acknowledged as the leading calligrapher by the Arab world, and when he passed the age of 90 years, the mantle was passed onto his former student, Hashem Muhammad al-Baghdadi, who would the last of the classical calligraphers. In handing over the role of leading calligrapher, Aytaç, in a clear reference to the importance of the medieval Baghdad School, said of al-Baghdadi, "the line grew up in Baghdad and ended there.

He died on 18 May, 1982 and was buried in the Karacaahmet Cemetery of Üsküdar district, Istanbul. He was the last of the Ottoman calligraphers.

== Work ==
His works are on display in many countries including Egypt and Iraq. His works are also on display in many newly built mosques of Istanbul. Some of his notable students include Hasan Çelebi, Fuat Başar, Hashem Muhammad al-Baghdadi and Hüseyin Kutlu.

== See also ==
- Culture of the Ottoman Empire
- Calligraphy
- Islamic art
- Islamic calligraphy
- List of Ottoman calligraphers
- Shafiq-Uz-Zaman Khan
