= Nativity of Jesus in later culture =

Depictions of the birth of Jesus Christ

The birth of Jesus has been depicted since early Christianity, and continues to be interpreted in modern artistic forms. Some of the artforms that have described Jesus' nativity include drama (including television and films) and music (including opera). Featured characters usually include Jesus, Mary, and Joseph.

== Literature ==
- Ben-Hur: A Tale of the Christ, Part One (1880)

== Drama ==
- The Nativity appears in many cycles of the Mystery Plays, dating back to medieval times.
- Laurence Housman (Bethlehem, 1902; musical accompaniment by Joseph Moorat c.1919).
- Lucjan Rydel (Polish Bethlehem, 1904).
- Cicely Hamilton (The Child in Flanders: A Nativity Play, 1922.
- Dorothy L. Sayers (He That Should Come, 1938). The first play of her radio-play cycle The Man Born to Be King deals with the birth of Jesus.
- Jean-Paul Sartre's first play was Bariona ou le fils du tonerre, a nativity play performed on Christmas Eve 1940 while a prisoner of war in a German stalag. Sartre saw Christ as part of the Jewish Resistance to the Roman Empire's occupation, mirroring the French Resistance of Nazi Germany's occupation.

== Opera and musicals ==
- Rutland Boughton, English composer and founder of the original Glastonbury Festival, wrote a very popular Nativity opera in 1915 called Bethlehem. In 1926, in sympathy with the General Strike and the miners' lockout, he restaged it in London, in modern dress, with Jesus born in a miner's cottage and Herod as the top-hatted capitalist, flanked by soldiers and police.
- Two From Galilee - A musical of Mary and Joseph leading up to the birth of Jesus Christ
- Amahl and the Night Visitors by Gian Carlo Monetti

== Film ==
- Ben-Hur (1959) recounts the Nativity in its prologue, and Balthasar (a major character) also recounts it in the third person later in the film.
- The Greatest Story Ever Told (1965) begins with the Nativity.
- Monty Python's Life of Brian (1978) depicts Magi (Three Wise Men) at the wrong stable almost giving their gifts to the infant Brian.
- The Nativity Story (2006)
- Nativity! (2009)
- The Star (2017)

== Television ==
- A scene in A Charlie Brown Christmas (1965) shows Linus recounting the Christmas Story involving the Nativity as told in the Gospel of Luke.
- Jesus of Nazareth (1977) begins with the Nativity
- The Nativity (1978)
- An episode of the Christian-themed anime series Superbook (1982) involves Chris, Joy, and Gizmo witnessing the Nativity
- The Liverpool Nativity produced by BBC Three in 2007, featuring Liverpool's music
- House episode "It's a Wonderful Lie" features a clinic patient diagnosed with contagious ecthyma from a donkey, due to her playing the Virgin Mary in a play.

== Classical music ==
See also Category:Christmas music

- Eustache Du Caurroy, 5 variations on "Une jeune fillette" (1610), first Christmas known for instruments.
- Heinrich Schütz, Weihnachts-Historie (Christmas oratorio), 1664 (SWV 435)
- Nicolas Gigault, 17 Noëls variés (1682).
- Marc-Antoine Charpentier, 9 vocal settings and 2 instrumental settings :
  - Messe de Minuit H.9 for soloists, chorus, flutes, strings, and bc (1690)
  - In nativitatem Domini canticum H.314 for 4 voices, 2 flutes, 2 violins, and bc (1670)
  - Canticum in nativitatem Domini H.393 for 3 voices, 2 treble instruments, and bc (1675)
  - Pastorale de Noël H.414 for soloists, chorus, 2 treble instruments, and bc (1683-85)
  - Oratorio de Noël H.416 for soloists, chorus, flutes, strings, and bc (1690)
  - Dialogus inter angelos et pastores Judae in nativitatem Domini H.420 for soloists, chorus, flutes, strings, and bc (1695?)
  - In nativitatem Domini Nostri Jesu Christi canticum H.421 for 3 voices, and bc (1698-99)
  - Pastorale de Noël H.482 for soloists, chorus, 2 treble viols, and bc (1683-85)
  - Pastorale de Noël H.483 - H.483 a - H.483 b for soloists, chorus, 2 flutes, 2 treble viols, and bc (1683-85)
  - Noël pour les instruments H.531 for flutes, strings, and bc (1688?)
  - Noël sur les instruments H.534 for flutes, strings, and bc (1698)
- Sébastien de Brossard Messe de Noël SdB.5 (1700)
- Nicola Porpora, Oratorio de Noël, Il Verbo in Carne
- Alessandro Scarlatti, Oratorio de Noël (1705)
- Michel-Richard de Lalande, Symphonies de Noël S 130 (1727-36 et 1736-45)
- Louis Grénon, Messe en Noëls en si bémol majeur
- Carl Heinrich Graun, Oratorium in Festum Nativitatis Christi
- Johann Sebastian Bach, Oratorio de Noël BWV 248-I à 248-VI (1734)
- André Campra, Oratorio de Noël, Nativitas Domini Jesu Christi (1710)
- Giuseppe Valentini, Sinfonia per Santissimo Natales
- Pierre Dandrieu publishes in 1714, un Livre de 42 Noëls for organ (mainly) and harpsichord.
- Michel Corette, about Christmas :
  - Concerto Spirituel, 1731.
  - Pastorale, 1732.
  - III Concerto de Noëls, 1735.
  - Noëls Suisses, 1737.
  - Noël Allemand "Lobt Gott, ihr Christen, alle gleich", 1741.
  - Concerto de noëls, 1754, lost.
- François-Joseph Gossec, La Nativité, Oratorio (1774)
- Jean-François Lesueur, Messe oratorio de Noël (1786)
- Camille Saint-Saëns, Oratorio de Noël op. 12 for 5 soloists, chorus, organ, harp and strings (1858)
- Hector Berlioz, la trilogie sacrée L'Enfance du Christ op. 25 (1854)
- Alexandre Guilmant, Noëls Opus 60
- Gabriel Pierné, Les Enfants à Bethlehem, Mystère en deux parties for soloists, children chorus and Orchestra (1907)
- Arthur Honegger, Une Cantate de Noël
- Jean-Michel Cayre, Oratorio de Noël (1982)
- Witold Lutosławski, Les Chants de Noël polonais (1946).
