= Mehmed Hulusi =

Bosnian journalist (1851–1907)

Pasha Mehmed Hulusi
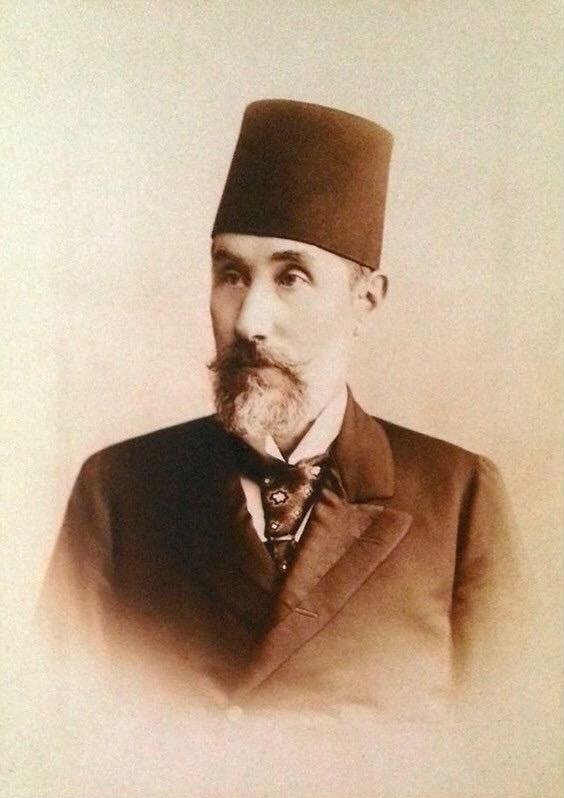
- Born: Mehmed Aliefendić−Džumrukčić; 1851; Sarajevo, Ottoman Empire
- Died: 31 March 1907 (aged 55–56); Sarajevo, Austria-Hungary
- Resting place: Hambina Carina Cemetery, Sarajevo
- Occupation: Journalist

Mehmed Hulusi Pasha (1851 – 31 March 1907) was a Bosnian journalist, editor of Neretva, the first newspaper in Herzegovina. He is the only Bosnian dignitary to have been decorated by the Ottoman Sultan, the King of Sweden, the Shah of Persia, and the Austrian Emperor.

== Biography ==
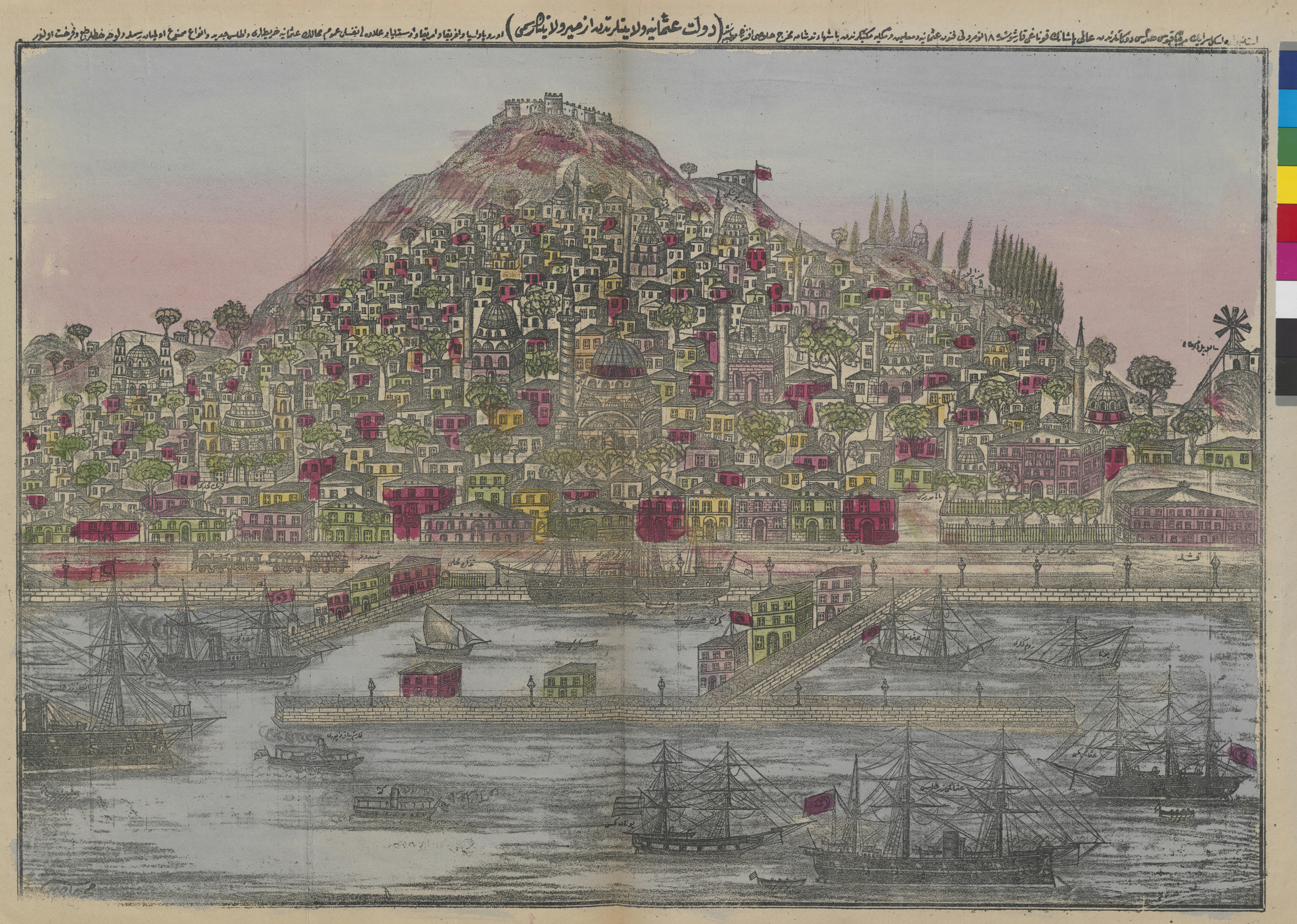
Illustration by Hulusi of Izmir, c. 1890

Born as Mehmed Aliefendić−Džumrukčić born in Sarajevo in 1851. His father Ali Effendi was a customs (džumrukdžija) officer, hence his double surname Aliefendić-Džumrukčić, but he was generally known as Mehmed Hulusi Effendi or Mehmed Hulusi Pasha. In hometown, he completed a mekteb and a madrasah, as well as a shortened gymnasium founded by the vilayet administration.

Mehmed Hulusi was one of the first Bosniaks journalists. He edited the newspaper Neretva in Mostar (1876). They were published bilingually, in Turkish and Bosnian language. It was printed in Printing house of the Herzegovina Vilayet. When govermant closed newspaper, he was editor in Vatan (from 1883) and Rehber (from 1897) in Sarajevo. Both newspapers were published in Turkish, in Ottoman Turkish script, on four pages. The newspapers was delivered to Istanbul and often quoted in newspapers and publications there. As journalist, he collaborated in some Turkish newspapers and occasionally appeared in the newspaper Bosna in Sarajevo. He spoke Bosnian, Arabic, Turkish and Persian language. He also knew how to write in German language.

He was also kaymakam of Novi Pazar, head of the vilayet office, waqf supervisor and director, and Rumelian pasha. He was the superintendent of the 1st and 2nd Girls' School for Muslims in Sarajevo, and he was the manager of the latter since its foundation in 1894. From 1897 he was a city councilor of Sarajevo.

He died in Sarajevo on March 31, 1907. He was buried in the Cemetery of Hambina Carina.
