= Tasmeem =

Tasmeem was a set of Arabic enhancements for Adobe InDesign ME, developed by WinSoft International and DecoType. Tasmeem allowed users to create typographically advanced text in Arabic in the Middle Eastern and North African versions of InDesign, turning it into a typesetting and design tool for Arabic.

== Arabic calligraphy with Tasmeem ==
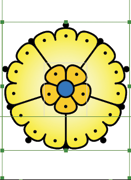
Rings

Tasmeem integrated Arabic traditional calligraphy with modern typefaces.

ASubset of Tasmeem features

=== Tasmeem fonts ===
Tasmeem 4 proposed a new collection of fonts such as Naskh, Emiri, and Hasan Hiba. Tasmeem fonts could only be used with Tasmeem.

=== Word Shaping ===
Word Shaping presented all the possible calligraphic alternatives for the selected letters of a word.

=== Text Shaping ===
Text Shaping dealt with the same calligraphic parameters as the Word Shaping, but automated it for large amounts of text. Distribution of shape alternates, dissimilation of the same letter through a variation, Kashida distribution and frequency can be precisely controlled and applied on long text, just like a regular paragraph style.

=== The Position Tuner ===
The Position Tuner feature allows dragging and positioning a segment of a word with the mouse in normal, searchable text. It adjusts spacing, and kerning and creates calligraphic arrangements. Moreover it can select and colour vowels independently.

=== Selection Helper ===
This feature facilitates the selection of non-linear text by pinpointing each letter and vowel.

=== Arabic Spacing ===
Arabic Spacing allows adjusting space between words and space between word segments.

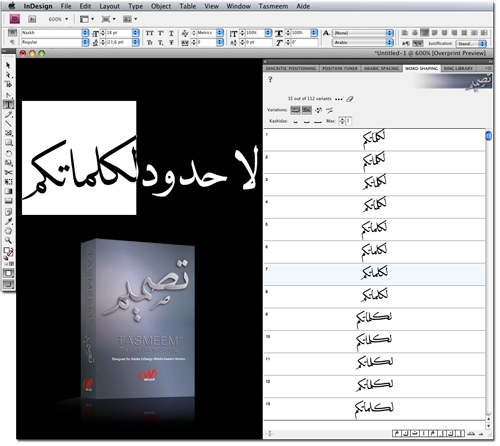
Tasmeem 4 interface

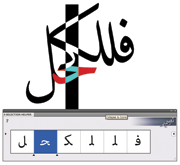
The Selection helper

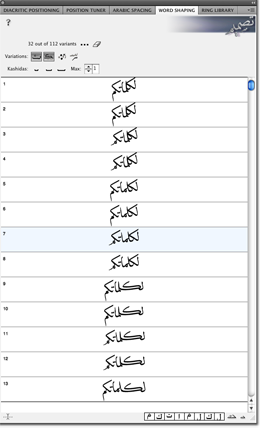
Word shaping
