= Typotheque =

Dutch type foundry and design studio

- Industry: Graphic design
- Genre: Typeface design
- Founded: 1999
- Founder: Peter Biľak
- Headquarters: The Hague, Netherlands
- Website: www.typotheque.com

Typotheque is a type foundry and publishing company based in The Hague, Netherlands, founded in 1999 by Peter Biľak. It is known for designing and publishing typefaces and for its contributions to multilingual typography.

Typotheque's work has been profiled in the design publications Abitare, Cap & Design, Designum, Druk, Dwell, Etapes, Emigre, I.D., Idea, Novum, Page, Print, Publish, and tipoGrafica. Typotheque's work has been recognized by the Type Directors Club.

== Background ==
Typotheque has produced typefaces including Fedra Sans, Fedra Serif, History, Greta Sans, November, Lava, and Zed. Its library supports 37 writing systems, including Adlam, Arabic, Armenian, Bangla, Braille, Chakma, Cherokee, Chinese, Cyrillic, Devanagari, Ethiopic, Georgian, Greek, Gujarati, Gurmukhi, Hebrew, Japanese, Kannada, Khmer, Korean, Lao, Latin, Malayalam, Meetei, Mongolian, Myanmar, Odia, Ol Chiki, Osage, Sinhala, Unified Canadian Syllabics, Tamil, Telugu, Thai, Tibetan, and Tifinagh.

In 2012, Metropolis magazine named Biľak a "Game Changer" for his work in non-Latin typography.

Typotheque's work often focuses on supporting digitally underrepresented languages and revitalising indigenous languages in North America, South Asia, and Africa.

The foundry has developed custom typefaces for clients including the Paris Metro, Vienna International Airport, Ford Motor Company, Mozilla, The New School, and the Norwegian Broadcasting Corporation (NRK). The NRK project received a D&AD Yellow Pencil award in 2023.

On 20 October 2009, Typotheque became the first type foundry to offer webfonts, implementing the @font-face CSS rule for embedding fonts on websites.

== Research ==
Typotheque conducts and publishes research on typography. Peer-reviewed publications include:

- Mangas, Héctor; Biľak, Peter; Arista, Roberto; Beier, Sofie (2026-11-16). "Age-Related Differences in Thai Typeface Legibility: The Influence of Looped Letters". Visible Language. 60 (3): 255–277. doi:10.34314/ees21w97. ISSN 2691-5529.
- Mangas, Héctor; Keizer, Anouk; Biľak, Peter; Beier, Sofie (2024). "Familiarity effect in the perception of handwriting: Evaluating in-group/out-group effect among readers of the Latin script". Journal of Writing Research. 16 (2): 203–222. doi:10.17239/jowr-2024.16.02.01.
- Mangas, Héctor; Biľak, Peter; Arista, Roberto; Beier, Sofie. "Enhancing distance reading for low vision: A reading acuity experiment on letter width". Information Design Journal. 29 (3): 223–239. doi:10.1075/idj.24012.man.

== Publishing ==
From 2013 to 2019, Typotheque published Works That Work, a biannual magazine focused on practical creativity and design processes. The company also publishes books on type design and typography, including What You Hear When You Read (2019), New Georgian Type (2023), New Thai Type (2025) and New East Asian Type (2026).

Typotheque and its work have been featured in Fast Company, Eye Magazine, Dezeen, Communication Arts, and the Times of India, the foundry's work has been cited for its innovation in multilingual typography, type design for underrepresented scripts, and contributions to digital publishing.

== Exhibitions ==
In 2019, after designing the new logo for the Kunstmuseum Den Haag, Typotheque presented a solo exhibition at the museum, the first in its history dedicated to type design.

== Awards ==
- Red Dot "Best of the Best" for the November typeface.
- European Design Awards for Ping (2009) and Zed (2024).
- Type Directors Club awards for Greta Text, November, Lava and others.
- Dezeen Award for work on North American Syllabics typography.
