= Arabic calligraphy =

Calligraphy using the Arabic script

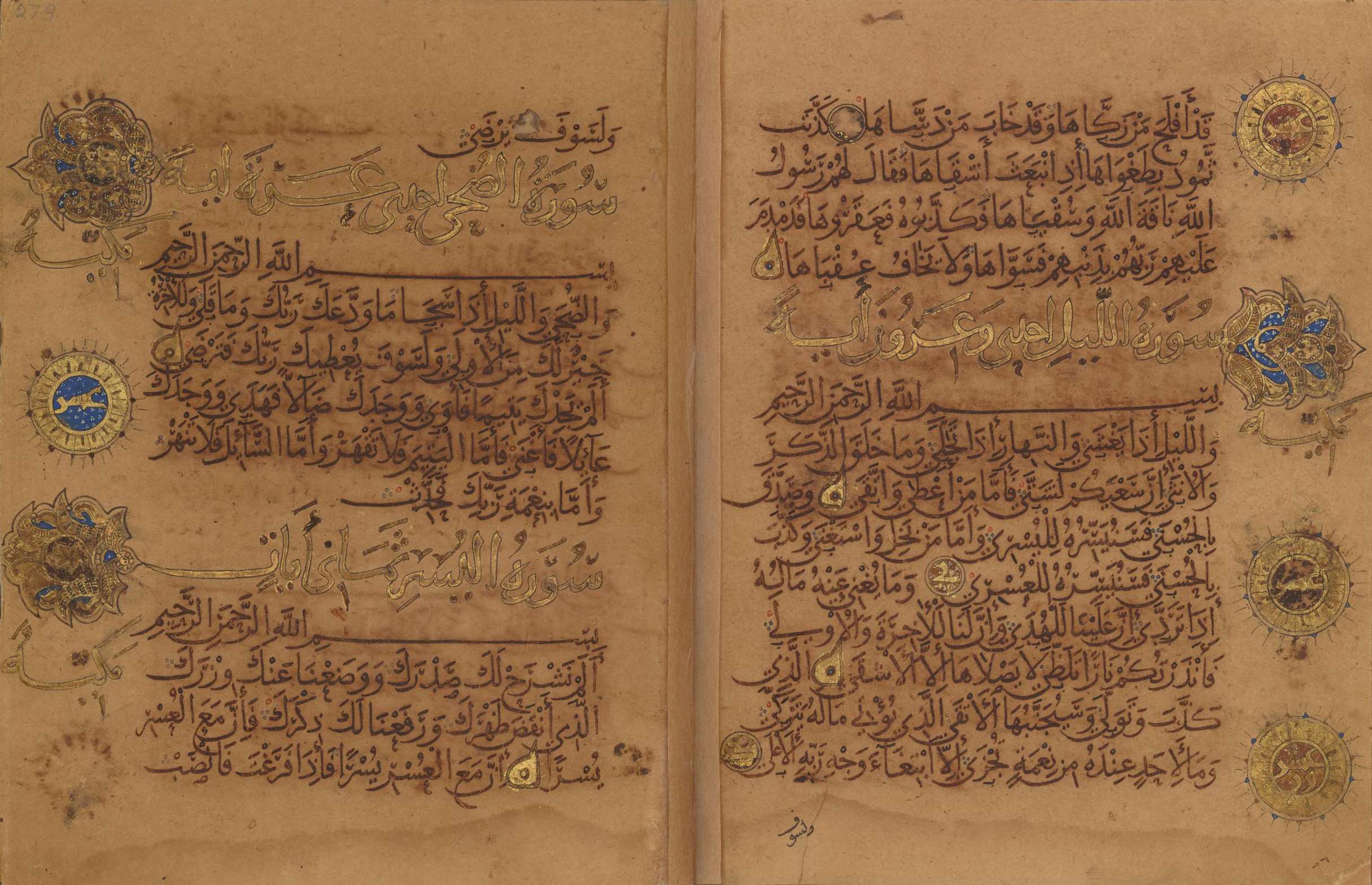
A copy of the Qur'an by Ibn al-Bawwab in the year 390 AH (1000/1001 CE), thought to be the earliest existing example of a Qur'an written in a cursive script.

Arabic calligraphy is the artistic practice of handwriting and calligraphy based on the Arabic alphabet. It is known in Arabic as khatt (Arabic: خَطّ), derived from the words 'line', 'design', or 'construction'. Kufic is the oldest form of the Arabic script.

Arabic calligraphy is known and appreciated for its diversity and potential for development. It is linked in Arabic culture to fields including religion, art, architecture, education, and craftsmanship, which in turn have played an important role in its advancement.

Although most Islamic calligraphy is in Arabic and most Arabic calligraphy is Islamic, the two are not identical. Coptic and other Christian manuscripts in Arabic have made use of Arabic calligraphy. Similarly, there is Islamic calligraphy in Persian and Ottoman Turkish.

== Arabic alphabet ==
The Arabic alphabet is one of the most widely used scripts in the world. It is believed that the alphabet was created around the 4th century CE. The alphabet consists of 28 letters written from right to left. Each letter can be written in four ways, depending on where the letter is placed in a word. The four locations are initial, medial, final, and isolated. All letters can connect from the right side (i.e. to the preceding letter), but some do not connect from the left side (i.e. to the subsequent letter).

Three letters can represent long vowels in certain contexts: ālif (ا), wāw (و), and yā (ي).

== Implements ==
The pens used for Arabic calligraphy vary from Latin calligraphy. The tools used for calligraphy are different assortments of pens and calligraphy ink. The most common calligraphy pen used is Qalam.

=== Khamish pen ===
The Khamish pen also known as a reed pen is used by Arab, Turkish, and Iranian calligraphers. The reed of the pen is grown along rivers. Although this pen has been used for over 500 years, preparing the pen is a lengthy process.

=== Java pen ===
The Java pen is known for the tool's hardness and ability to create sharp edges. The pen is good to use for small scripts.

=== Handam pen ===
The Handam pen consists of the same strength as the Java pen. The pen is good to use for all kinds of scripts.

=== Celi pen ===
The Celi pen is used for large writing in Arabic calligraphy. These pens are made from hardwood and cut and drilled.

== Evolution ==
Arabic calligraphy evolved from a tool for communication and documentation to an artistic form in the span of 13 centuries, it was also implemented in various other fields such as mathematics and astronomy. It is a central form of decoration in Islamic art, such as decorative design and architecture. Historians consider Qutba al-Muharrir to be the earliest Arab calligrapher. The evolution of Arabic calligraphy led to the appearance of various scripts, including cursive styles such as Nastaliq and Ruq'ah, and more square, angular styles such as Kufic. The linguistic features of Arabic scripts are shared between all scripts despite differences in styles.

== Scripts ==
=== Kufic ===
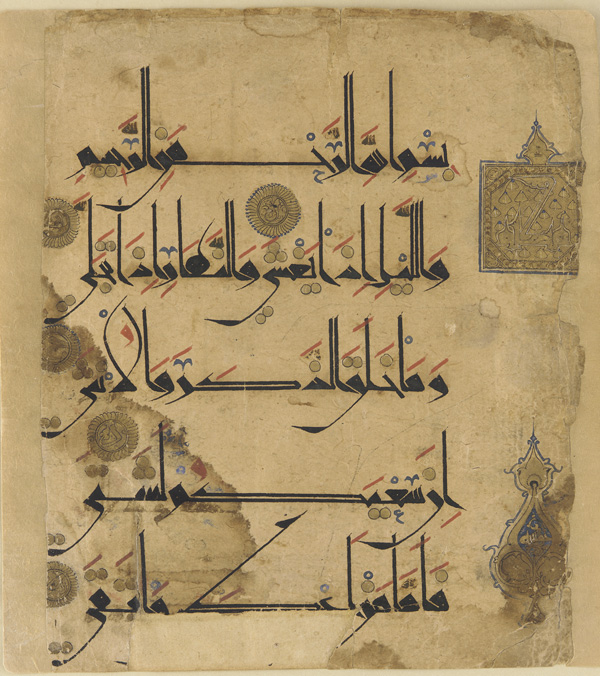
Qur'an folio 11th century CE kufic

Originally used for inscription on stone and metal, the Kufic style of Arabic calligraphy received its name due to its birth in the city of Kufa, Iraq. This script is one of the oldest scripts used in Arabic and Islamic calligraphy; due to this, the style has undergone many evolutions and changes in its life course, as many attempts were made to perfect it. However, this also led to the development of many different variations of this script, such as the floriated Kufic, square Kufic, knotted Kufic, and many others. This also means there are a few distinguishing features of the Kufic script.

The Kufic style has been used almost exclusively for Arabic, as opposed to other languages, such as Persian and Urdu, that are written in systems derived from Arabic; a single exception to this is a series of Persian rhymes found on a building in Ghazni from the 11th century.

=== Naskh ===
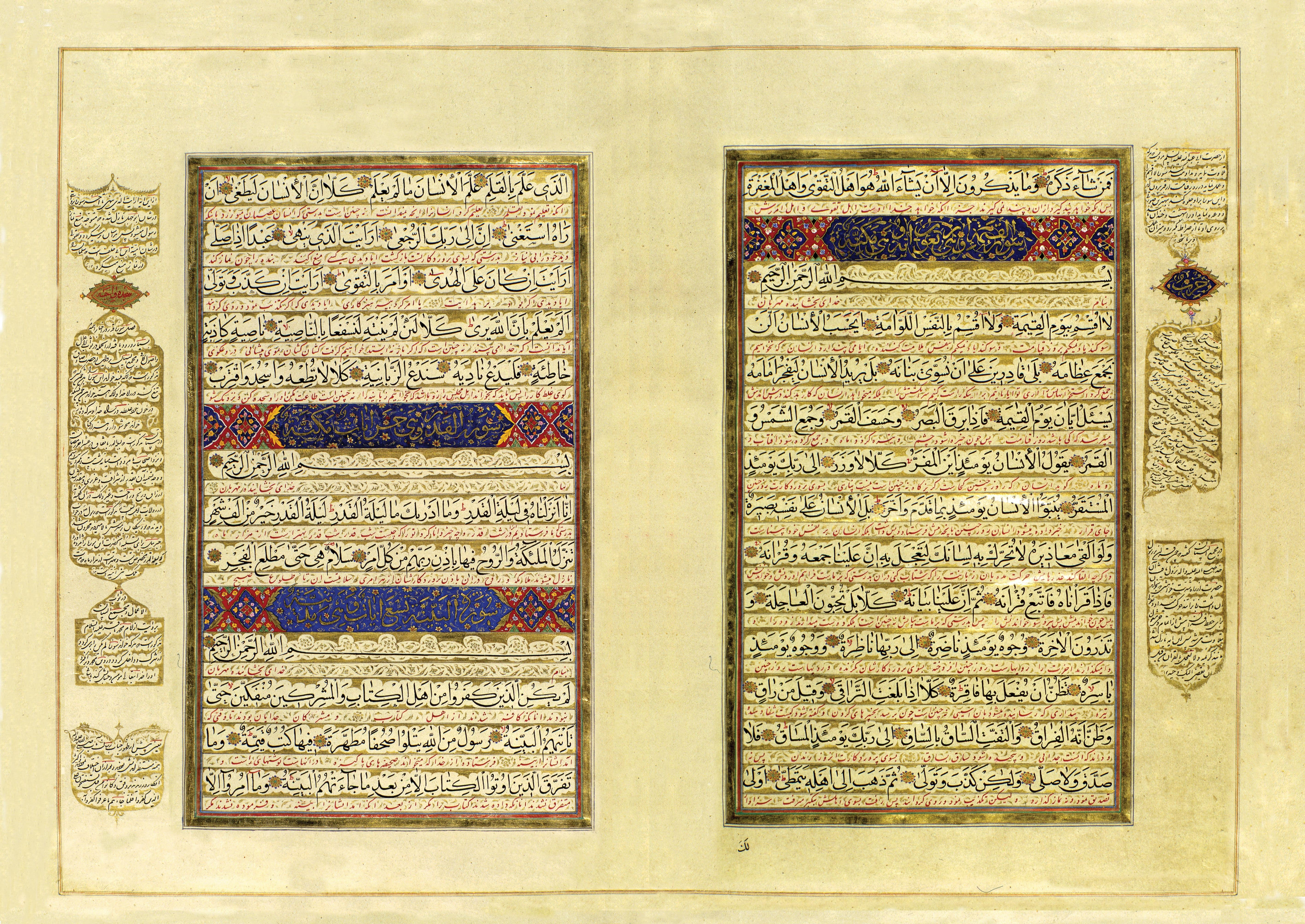
Qur'an folio in black Naskh script with Persian translation in red Nasta‘liq script

Known as the Naskh or Naskhī script, this script is said to have originated from Mecca and Medina. The script is used as a cursive script, for example on papyrus and paper. The origins of the style are debated by scholars, but some believe it initially stemmed from the Thuluth script.But recent discoveries in Jabal Sala in Medina have proven that the Naskh script precedes the Thuluth script and that it existed before Ibn Muqla al-Shirazi. One of the main usages for this script was for writing the Quran but it was also used for inscription on metal antiquities, woods and other objects of decorative purpose. The main evolutionary periods for this script were the 3rd and 4th centuries AH, coinciding with the evolution of other similar popular styles such as the Rayhani, Thulth, and Muhaqqaq.

=== Other scripts ===
The Thuluth, Nasta'liq and Diwani scripts are other scripts used for Arabic scripting.

The Thuluth script, used during the medieval times, is known as one of the oldest scripts to exist. The script was used in mosques and for Quranic text due to the appearance of the text.

The Nasta'liq script is used more for Persian than Arabic scripting. Because of the downward slant to the left, the script is seen as different from the other scripts.

The Diwani script was created during the Ottoman era. The lining and lettering of this script creates a sense of closeness when writing. Due to this reason, it is difficult to read since the letters intertwine.

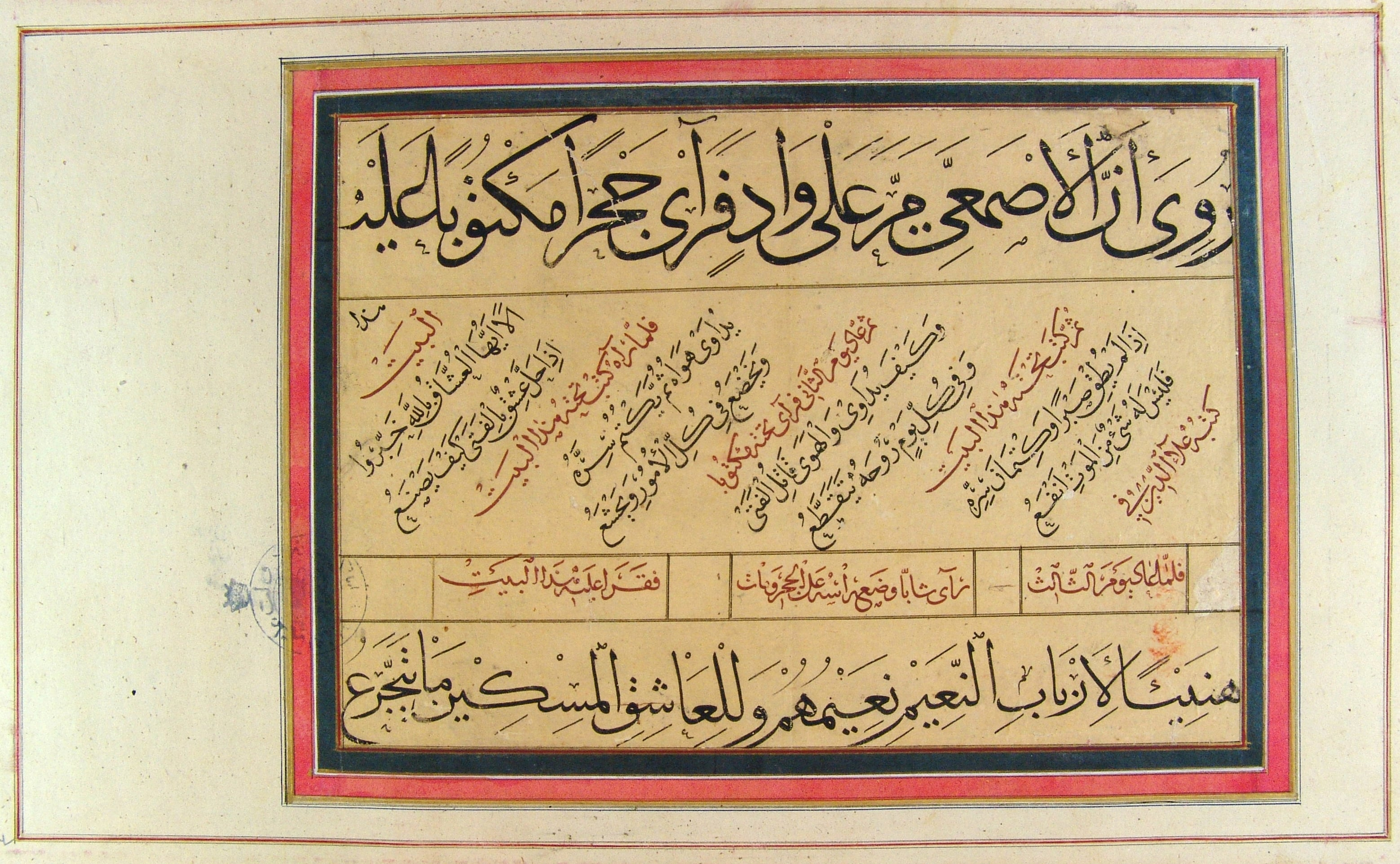
Folio of an album in Thuluth script

A few other examples:

- Rayhani script
- Muhaqqaq script
- Ruq'ah script

== List of calligraphers ==
=== Medieval ===
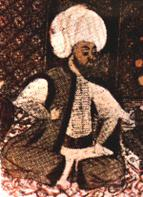
Isḥāq al-Kindī (801-873) as represented in a medieval manuscript

- Qutba Al-Muharrir. (8th Umayyad era)
- Ibrahim Al-Shajri. (8th)
- Al-Kindi (801-873 AD)
- Ibn Muqla (d. 939/940)
- Ibn al-Bawwab (d. 1022)
- Fakhr-un-Nisa (12th century)

=== Ottoman era ===
- Shaykh Hamdullah (1436–1520)
- Hamid Aytaç (1891-1982)
- Seyyid Kasim Gubari (d. 1624)
- Hâfiz Osman (1642–1698)
- Mustafa Râkim (1757–1826)
- Mehmed Shevki Efendi (1829–1887)

=== Contemporary ===
- Hasan Çelebi (b. 1937), Turkey
- Ali Adjalli (b. 1939), Iran
- Wijdan Ali (b. 1939), Jordan
- Hashem Muhammad al-Baghdadi, Iraq
- Everitte Barbee (b. 1988), United States of America
- Mohammad Hosni Syria
- Shakkir Hassan Al Sa'id (1925-2004) in Iraq
- Madiha Omar Iraqi-American
- Hassan Massoudy Iraqi-French (b. 1944)
- Sadequain Naqqash (1930-1987), Pakistan
- Ibrahim el-Salahi (b. 1930), Sudan
- Mouneer Al-Shaarani (b. 1952), Syria
- Mahmoud Taha (b. 1942), Jordan
- Mohamed Zakariya (b. 1942), United States of America
- Uthman Taha (b. 1934), Syria
- Shafiq-Uz-Zaman Khan Pakistan
- Hamza Asjad Pakistan

== Legacy ==
=== Type design and type setting ===
Arabic calligraphy serves as a major source of inspiration for Arabic type design. For example, the Amiri typeface is inspired by the Naskh script used at the Amiri Press in Cairo.

The shift from Arabic calligraphy to Arabic typefaces presents technical challenges.

=== Islamic world and civilization ===
Credited to be the one that catalyzed the growth of Arabic calligraphy; with the earliest works of Arabic calligraphy being featured in copies of the Quran dating back to the first century of Islam's revelation such as Birmingham Quran Manuscript, Codex Parisino-Petropolitanus and several others.

Arabic calligraphy can be on occasion be found in Mosques with engravings of Quranic verses / Ayah present on parts of the architecture itself.

The most widely recognized example of Arabic Calligraphy on a place of Islamic worship is the Kaaba present in Mecca, Saudi Arabia.

Arabic calligraphy specializes into the term Islamic calligraphy when it is associated with the Islamic world.

=== Art ===
EL Seed, a French-Tunisian graffiti artist, makes use of Arabic calligraphy in his various art projects, in a style called calligraffiti.

The Hurufiyya (الحروفية letters) movement, since its beginnings in the early 20th century, uses the artistic manipulation of Arabic calligraphy and typography in abstraction.

Taking Shape: Abstraction From the Arab World, 1950s-1980s, a 2020 installation at New York University's Grey Art Gallery, explored how Arabic calligraphy, with its ancient presence in visual art, influenced abstract art in the Arab world. For Madiha Omar, the Arabic alphabet was a means of expressing a secular identity and appropriating Western painting, while Omar El-Nagdi explored the inherent divinity of Arabic calligraphy.

== Modern examples ==
The Emirates logo is written in traditional Arabic calligraphy

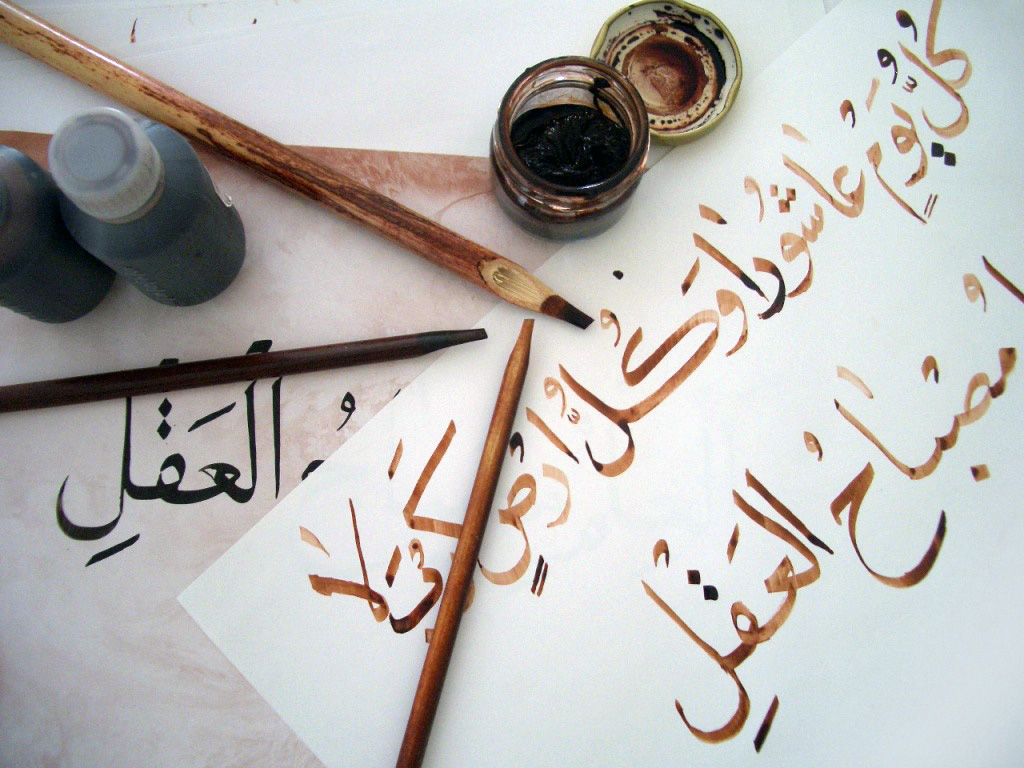
The instruments and work of a student calligrapher. The phrase written on the top of the paper shows the Shiite saying "Every day is Ashura and every land is Karbala."

The official logo of the Saudi Tourism website that translates to "visit Saudi Arabia" in vernacular Arabic

Logo of the Saudi National Center for Archives and Records

== See also ==
- Islamic calligraphy
- Abu Saymeh
- Arab world
