= Arabic typography =

Design of type in the Arabic alphabet

Arabic typography is the typography of letters, graphemes, characters or text in Arabic script, for example for writing Arabic, Persian, or Urdu. 16th century Arabic typography was a by-product of Latin typography with Syriac and Latin proportions and aesthetics. It lacked expertise in the three core aspects of Arabic writing: calligraphy, style and system. Calligraphy requires aesthetically skilled writing in a chosen canonical style such as naskh, nastaʿlīq or ruqʿah. System denotes the script grammar covering such rules as horizontality and stretching.

== Characteristics ==
Some characteristics used in Latin scripts, like bold, letter spacing or italic, are not usually used in Arabic typography.

=== Calligraphic style ===
Some Arabic computer fonts are calligraphic, for example Arial, Courier New, and Times New Roman. They look as if they were written with a brush or oblong pen, akin to how serifs originated in stone inscriptions. Other fonts, like Tahoma and Noto Sans Arabic, use a mono-linear style more akin to sans-serif Latin scripts. Monolinear means that the lines have the same width throughout the letter.

Text example	Calligraphic (Arial)	Monolinear (Tahoma)
Eastern Arabic numerals	Sample Arabic script using Arial font	Sample Arabic script using Tohoma font
Abjad Hawz (ابجد هوز), an Arabic alphabet song	Sample Arabic script using Arial font	Sample Arabic script using Tohoma font

The adaptation of classical calligraphic rules into digital environments led to the creation of specialized typesetting software, notably Tasmeem—developed by WinSoft in partnership with DecoType to integrate the Arabic Calligraphic Engine (ACE) into Adobe InDesign ME—and eMashq, a dedicated web-based calligraphy platform. In his guide to digital Arabic calligraphy, designer and calligrapher Nihad Nadam discusses the functional differences between these tools, noting that while Tasmeem focused on typographic typesetting and contextual-form control within desktop publishing software, eMashq was designed as an interactive web tool for calligraphic composition and letter-form manipulation.

=== Overlines ===
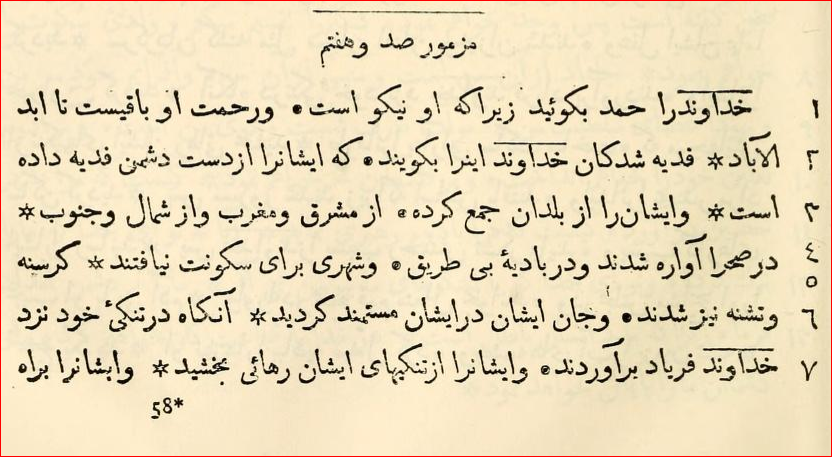
Overlines used in a version of the Bible in Persian (1920)

Historically, Arabic text used overlines to indicate emphasis.

=== Slant (italic) ===
Some Arabic styles such as Diwani use a right-to-left downward-sloping slant.

=== Use of right angles ===
Some typefaces use more right angles, for example Noto Kufi Arabic. Others, like Tahoma and Arial, have a more rounded style (see graph below). A font with tendency towards right angles is also called 'angled', and rounded fonts are also called 'cursive'.

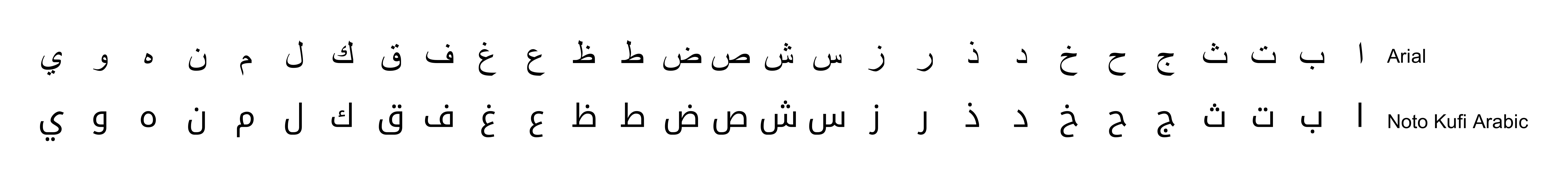

== See also ==
- Arabic calligraphy
- Naskh (script)
- Typeface anatomy
- Digital Arabic typography
- Category:Arabic typefaces
- Category:Iranian typographers and type designers
