= Peter Biľak =

Slovak graphic and typeface designer

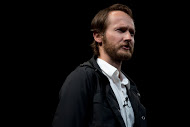
- Peter Biľak in 2013
- Born: March 29, 1973 (age 53)
- Occupations: Typeface designer; graphic designer
- Website: peterbilak.com

Peter Biľak (Slovak pronunciation: [ˈpeter ˈbiʎak]; born 29 March 1973) is a Dutch-Slovak designer based in The Hague, Netherlands. He works in the editorial, graphic, and type design fields.

He has been teaching typography since 2001 at the Royal Academy of Arts in The Hague. He founded Typotheque in 1999, a company that develops fonts for global languages and also operates as a publishing house. His personal focus is on the support of digitally disadvantaged languages and the revitalisation of indigenous languages in North America, South Asia and Africa.

== Biography ==
Biľak was born in Czechoslovakia on 29 March 1973. He initially studied at the Art Academy in Bratislava, then studied briefly in the United Kingdom and the United States. Later, he went to Atelier National de Création Typographique in Paris for his master's degree and Jan van Eyck Academie in Maastricht, Netherlands, for his postgraduate laureate.

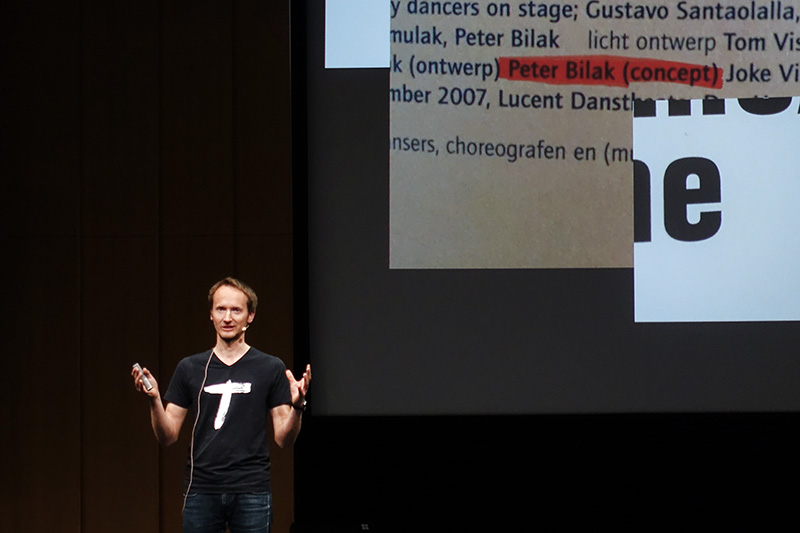
Peter Biľak at Typo Berlin 2017

Biľak started his career with Studio Dumbar, an international design agency in The Hague.

In 2003, he designed a series of standard post stamps for the Dutch Royal Mail (TNT Post). Since 2004, Biľak has collaborated with the choreographer Lukáš Timulak on the concepts of dance performances. Together, they were the subject of an exhibition 'InLoop/EnTry' in Stroom, Centre for Art and Architecture. Timulak and Bilak established the Make Move Think Foundation, an organisation dedicated to the facilitation of multidisciplinary artistic collaborations. These collaborations primarily encompass the realm of modern dance performances, though they also extend to the realm of film production. A plethora of institutions and companies have benefitted from the talents of Bilak, including Nederlands Dans Theater, Gothenburg Ballet, Royal Swedish Ballet, Staatsballett Hannover, Slovak National Theatre, Lyon Opera Ballet and Les Ballets de Monte Carlo. In addition, Bilak has been instrumental in conceptualising the overarching vision for projects, often entrusted with the design of the evening's set.

Alongside Timulak, he co-founded the Make Move Think Foundation, an organization that supports multidisciplinary artistic collaborations, primarily in the field of modern dance and occasionally in film production.

Bilak has collaborated with a range of dance institutions and companies, including Nederlands Dans Theater, Gothenburg Ballet, Royal Swedish Ballet, Staatsballett Hannover, Slovak National Theatre, Lyon Opera Ballet, and Les Ballets de Monte Carlo. His contributions have included choreographic collaboration as well as set and visual design. In many of these projects, Bilak has played a role in developing the conceptual framework and has been responsible for set design.

In 2015, Biľak, together with Andrej Krátky, co-founded Fontstand, a desktop app that allows users to try fonts for free or rent them per month.

In 2015, in partnership with the Lebanese designer Kristyan Sarkis, Biľak established TPTQ Arabic, a sister type foundry dedicated to research and exploration of Arabic type. In collaboration, they developed Arabic and Latin fonts for prominent institutions and organisations, including Louvre, Abu Dhabi, Mozilla, Ford, and Lincoln.

He also co-created Dot Dot Dot with Stuart Bailey in 2000. He is a member of AGI and lectures on his work internationally. He is a writer for numerous design magazines and contributes writing in Print, Emigre, Eye (magazine), Items, tipoGrafica, Idea (magazine), Abitare, and Page.

In 2013, after raising €30,000 in a crowdfunding campaign, Biľak founded Works That Work, a creativity-focused magazine, which was published twice a year by Typotheque. The magazine was not available for purchase in retail outlets; rather, it relied on a reader-based distribution model. This model was the subject of a study by the Columbia Journalism Review and the Nieman Journalism Lab at Harvard.

== Fonts ==
Biľak has designed typefaces, many of which have been released through his independent type foundry, Typotheque, established in 1999.

His early work includes Craft (1993), Eureka (1995), and Eureka Sans (1998), published by FontShop. Biľak gained broader recognition with the release of Fedra Sans (2001) and Fedra Serif (2003), both of which became widely used in multilingual publishing and branding contexts. These typefaces were notable for blending modernist principles with humanist warmth and were among the first to support extensive script systems including Latin, Cyrillic, Greek, and later Arabic, Armenian, Bengali, Chinese, Devanagari, Georgian, Hebrew, Japanese, Korean, Tamil, Thai.

Biľak continued to expand Typotheque's library with superfamilies such as Greta Text (2007) and Greta Sans (2012), designed to meet the demanding needs of editorial design. His 2008 typeface History offered a modular approach, allowing users to create hundreds of stylistic variations from a single system. Other significant releases include Irma (2009), Julien (2011), and Karloff (2012), which explores contrasts in visual taste through the juxtaposition of "positive" and "negative" design principles.

In 2013, Biľak introduced Lava, a text typeface optimized for digital and print reading environments, followed by Manu, November, and October in 2016. More recent projects include Ping (2019), a flexible sans-serif family, Q-Project (2020), and Zed (2024), continuing his exploration of type design for global scripts and user interfaces.

== Exhibitions ==
- What You Hear When You Read, Kunstmuseum Den Haag, 2019 – Solo exhibition exploring the relationship between reading and sound.
- Typo en Mouvement, Le Lieu du Design, Paris, 2015 – Group exhibition focused on the dynamic aspects of typography.
- Memory Palace, Victoria & Albert Museum, London, 2013 – Featured as one of twenty designers commissioned to interpret a multidimensional narrative.
- Neue Schriften, Gutenberg Museum, Mainz, 2013 – Group exhibition presenting contemporary developments in type design.
- Bewegte Schrift / Type in Motion, Museum für Gestaltung Zürich, 2011 – Included Biľak's interactive installation Dance Writer.
- Connecting Concepts, National Institute of Design, Ahmedabad, India, 2011 – Travelling exhibition on the conceptual foundations of Dutch design.
- Van Grote Waarde – Iconen van de Post, De Affiche Galerij, The Hague, 2011 – Exhibition on the visual history of the Dutch postal service.
- Graphic Design: Now in Production, Walker Art Center, Minneapolis, 2011 – Survey exhibition of contemporary graphic design practices.
- Open Projects, 21st Festival International de l’Affiche et du Graphisme, Chaumont, 2010 – Curated by Cristina Chiappini and Silvia Sfligiotti.
- InLoop/EnTry: Peter Biľak & Lukáš Timulak, Stroom Den Haag, 2010 – Showcased collaborative projects between Biľak and choreographer Lukáš Timulak.
- Quick Quick Slow, ExperimentaDesign Lisbon (EXD’09), 2009 – Group exhibition exploring the theme of time in graphic design, curated by Emily King.
- Freedom and Order: Quattro Grafici Olandesi, ISEA, Urbino, Italy, 2008 – Featured alongside Karel Martens, Mevis & Van Deursen, and Maurer Mooren.

== Awards ==
In 2012, he was named as one of Metropolis' 12 Game Changers, due to his contribution to non-Latin typography. In 2014, the Deputy Prime Minister and Minister of Foreign and European Affairs of the Slovak Republic awarded Biľak the Goodwill Envoy award for spreading the reputation of Slovakia. In 2019 he was awarded the Gold Prize in the European Design Awards for his font "Ping," a typeface that supported hundreds of Latin-based languages, and 10 non-Latin languages.

== Selected bibliography ==
- Bilak, Peter; Bailey, Stuart, eds. (19 April 2007). Dot Dot Dot 13. Princeton Architectural Press. p. 104. ASIN B005M4TDL6.
- Bilak, Peter; Bailey, Stuart, eds. (21 July 2006). Dot Dot Dot 11. Princeton Architectural Press. p. 104. ISBN 9789077620052.
- Bilak, Peter (15 February 2005). Bailey, Stuart (ed.). Dot Dot Dot 8. Princeton Architectural Press. p. 104. ISBN 9789077620021.
- Bilak, Peter (1 January 2008). KAPITAL K. Onomatopee. ISBN 9789078454229.
- Bilak, Peter; Bailey, Stuart, eds. (2 October 2008). Dot Dot Dot 12: Maybe It's Time It's Maybe. Princeton Architectural Press. p. 104. ISBN 9789077620069.
- Bilak, Peter; Bailey, Stuart, eds. (1 March 2006). Dot Dot Dot 11. Princeton Architectural Press. p. 104. ISBN 9789077620052.
- Bilak, Peter; Bailey, Stuart, eds. (15 February 2005). Dot Dot Dot 8. Princeton Architectural Press. p. 104. ISBN 9789077620021.
- Bilak, Peter (31 March 2010). ECAL: Typeface as Program. JRP|Ringier. p. 180. ISBN 9783037640722.
- Bilak, Peter; Bailey, Stuart (15 October 2004). Dot Dot Dot 7. Princeton Architectural Press. p. 104. ISBN 9789077620014.
- Bilak, Peter; Bailey, Stuart, eds. (1 February 2008). Dot Dot Dot: S As N Sstenographer. Princeton Architectural Press. p. 104. ISBN 9789077620083.
