= Hilda =

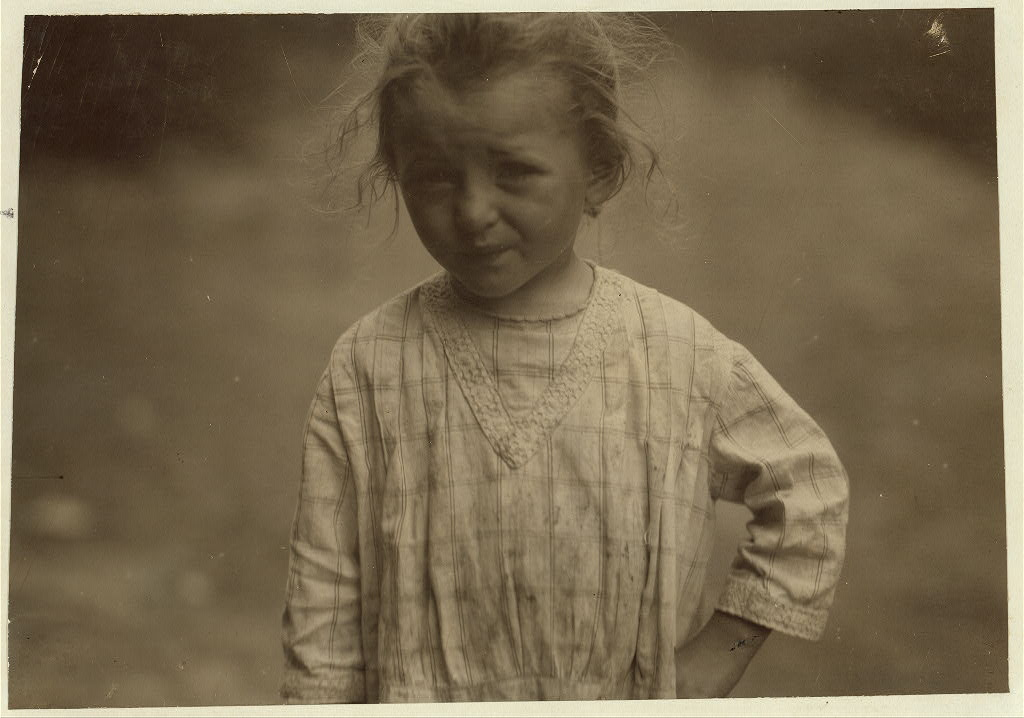
- Hilda, a three-year-old American girl, was photographed by Lewis Hine for a report on child labor as she picked sugar beets in Wisconsin in July, 1915. Her name ranked 104th most popular in the United States when Hilda was born in 1912.
- Pronunciation: /ˈhɪldə/ HIL-də
- Gender: Feminine

Origin
- Origin: Hild
- Meaning: Battle

Other names
- Related names: Hilde, Hildur, Hildy, Brunhilde, Brynhild, Hildebrand, Hildegard, Gunhild, Krimhild, Mathilde

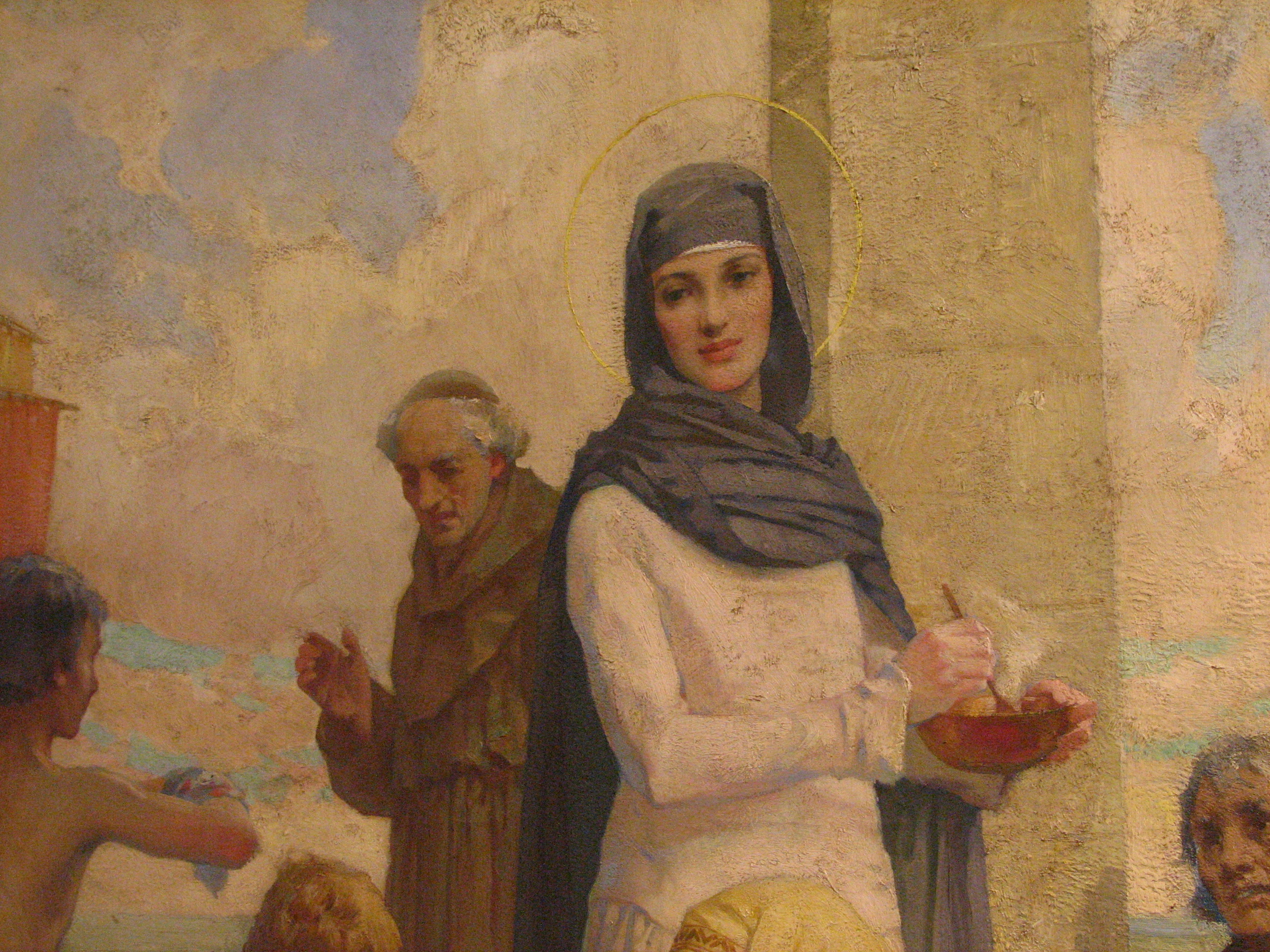
Saint Hilda at Hartlepool by James Clark.

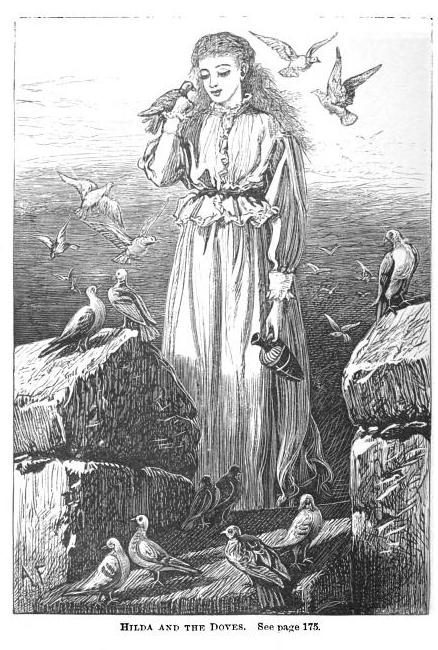
Hilda and the Doves, an illustration for Nathaniel Hawthorne’s The Marble Faun.

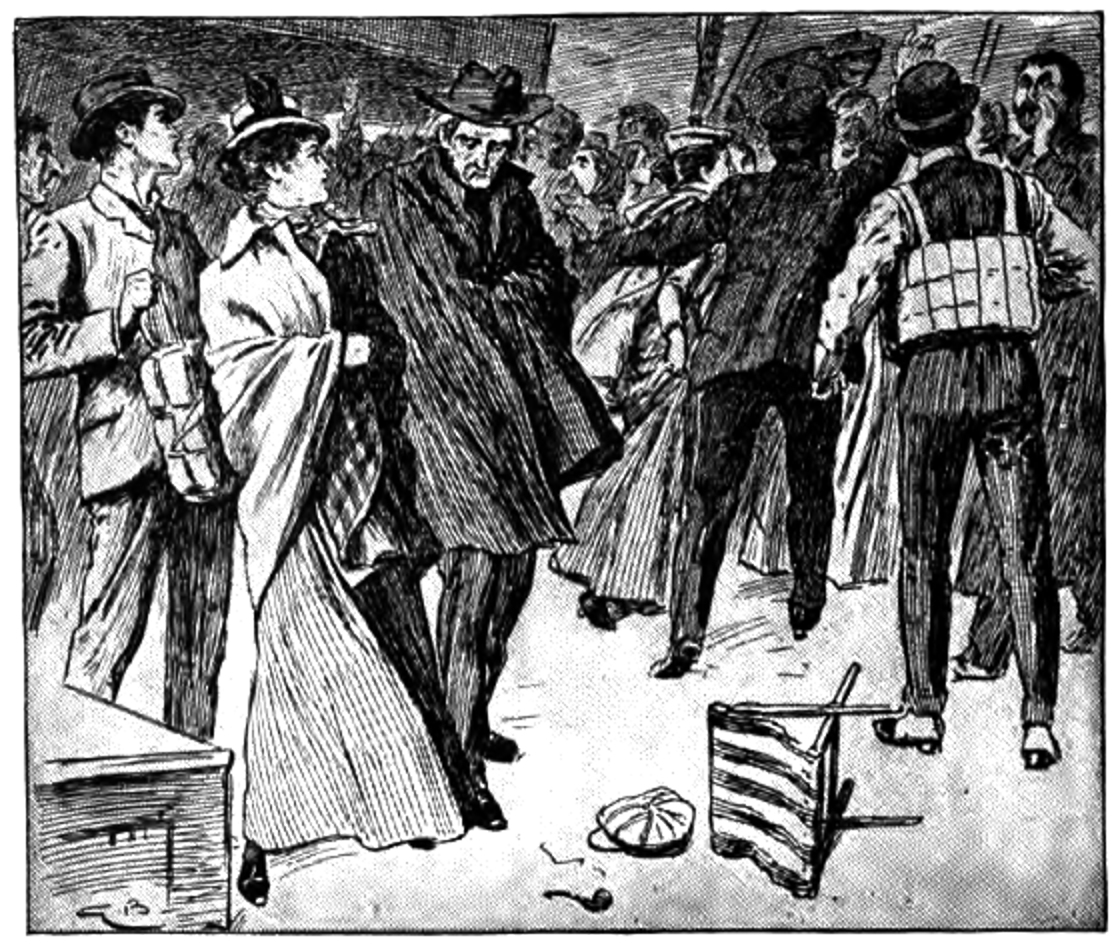
An illustration for Hilda Wade by Grant Allen.

Hilda is one of several feminine given names derived from the name Hild, formed from Old Norse hildr, meaning 'battle'. Hild, a Nordic-German Bellona, was a Valkyrie who conveyed fallen warriors to Valhalla. Warfare was often called Hild's Game. Hilda of Whitby was an early Christian saint.

Hylda is a spelling variant. Hilde is a variant of Hilda. Another variation on Hild is Hildur. Hildy is an English nickname. Ildikó is a Hungarian form of the name.

== Cultural influences ==
The name became rare in England during the later Middle Ages, but was revived in the 19th century. Several English-language popular 19th century novelists used the name Hilda for their heroines. Hilda Scarve was the romantic heroine of the 1842 novel The Miser's Daughter by William Harrison Ainsworth. Nathaniel Hawthorne used the name Hilda for the innocent art student heroine of his 1860 novel The Marble Faun. Hilda Van Gleck is a wealthy girl in Mary Mapes Dodge’s 1865 children's novel Hans Brinker or the Silver Skates. The hero wants to impress Hilda by winning a race. Hilda Wade by author Grant Allen was published in 1900. In the crime fiction novel, heroine Hilda refuses to marry a man unless he helps solve the murder of her father.

More recent cultural influences include the Netflix animated series Hilda, which aired from 2018 to 2023, and characters in the 2013 video game The Legend of Zelda: A Link Between Worlds and the 2022 video game Asterigos: Curse of the Stars.

== Usage ==
In Sweden the name Hilda has been in use since the late 18th century, being a popular name throughout the 19th century. The name has come back into fashion in Sweden, where Hilda has been among the 100 most popular names for newborn Swedish girls since 2001. It is also currently well-used for girls in Finland, where Hilda has been among the 50 most popular names for Finnish girls since 2014.

The name was also well-used in the late 19th and early 20th centuries in countries such as Brazil, Canada, the Czech Republic, France, Germany, Latvia, New Zealand, Spain, and the United Kingdom.

Hilda was the 198th most popular name for American girls born in 1880 in the United States. The name peaked in popularity in the United States in 1903, when it was the 88th most popular name for American girls. Hilda remained among the 1,000 most popular names for American girls until 1986. Between 1987 and 2017, the name was most commonly used among Hispanic American families. The name reached the lowest point of use in the United States in 2013, when it was used for 33 newborn American girls.

There were 60 newborn American girls given the name in 2022 and 56 American girls given the name in 2023.

Hilda is the name of:

== People ==
- Hilda of Whitby (c. 614 – 680), English saint
- Princess Hilda (disambiguation), various princesses
- Hilda Aitken (1891–1987), Bermudian politician
- Hilda Baci (born 1995), Nigerian chef and actress
- Hilda Bernard (1920–2022), Argentine stage, screen and television actress
- Hilda Bernstein (1915–2006), British author, artist, and anti-apartheid and women's rights activist
- Hilda Borgström (1871–1954), Swedish actress
- Hilda Bettermann (1942–2023), American politician
- Hilda Bowen (1923–2002), Bahamian nurse
- Hilda Braid (1929–2007), English actress
- Hilda Mabel Canter (1922–2007), English mycologist, protozoologist, and photographer
- Hilda Carline (1889–1950), British painter
- Hilda Caselli (1836–1901), Swedish educational reformer
- Hilda Cid (born 1933), Chilean crystallographer
- Hilda Clarke (1896–1981), American politician
- Hilda Clayton (1991–2013), American U.S. Army specialist and war photographer
- Hilda Conkling (1910–1986), American poet
- Hilda Dallas (1878–1958) and sister Irene Dallas (1883–1971), British suffragettes
- Hilda Dajč (1922–1942), Yugoslav-Jewish student and Holocaust victim
- Hilda Dehil (1917–1978), Argentine actress and singer
- Hilda Eisen (1917–2017), Polish-American businessperson, philanthropist, and Holocaust survivor
- Hilda Ellis Davidson (1914–2006), English antiquarian and academic
- H.D. (1886–1961), born Hilda Doolittle, American poet, novelist and memoirist
- Hilda de Duhalde (born 1946), Argentine politician
- Hilda Fenemore (1914–2004), English actress
- Hilda Grayson Finney (1913–1976), American educator
- Hilda Gadea (1921–1974), Peruvian economist, communist leader, author, and Che Guevara's first wife
- Hilda Gaunt (1906–1975), British pianist
- Hilda Gaxiola (born 1972), Mexican beach volleyball player
- Hilda Geiringer (1893–1973), Austrian mathematician and professor
- Hilda Gobbi (1913–1988), Hungarian actress
- Hilda Goldblatt Gorenstein (Hilgos) (1905–1998), American oil painter and watercolorist
- Hilda Kay Grant (1910–1996), Canadian writer and artist
- Hilda Habichayn (1934–2021), Argentine sociologist
- Hilda Hewlett (1864–1943), British aviator and business entrepreneur
- Hilda Heine (born 1951), Marshallese educator and politician
- Hilda Hidalgo (born 1970), Costa Rican film director
- Hilda Hilst (1930–2004), Brazilian poet, playwright and novelist
- Hilda Phoebe Hudson (1881–1965), English mathematician
- Hilda Jennings (1894–1978), British social worker, community activist and author
- Hilda Jesser (1894–1985), Austrian artist and designer
- Hilda Käkikoski (1864–1912), Finnish politician, writer and schoolteacher
- Hilda Kibet (born 1981), Dutch long-distance runner
- Hilda Magdalena Licerio Valdés (born 1993), Mexican politician
- Hilda López (1922–1996), Uruguayan painter and sculptor
- Hilda Lovell-Smith (1886–1973), New Zealand businesswoman and community organiser
- Hilda Lund (1840–1911), Swedish ballerina
- Hilda Molina (born 1943), Cuban physician
- Hilda Mundy (1912–1980), Bolivian writer, poet, journalist
- Hilda Murrell (1906 to on or before 24 March 1984), British environmentalist and peace campaigner
- Hilda Flavia Nakabuye (born 1997), Ugandan climate and environmental rights activist
- Hilda Rix Nicholas (1884–1961), Australian painter
- Hilda Nilsson (1876–1917), Swedish serial killer
- Hilda Paredes (born 1957), Mexican composer
- Hilda Pérez Carvajal (1945–2019), Venezuelan biologist
- Hilda Petrie (1871–1957), British egyptologist
- Hilda Petrini (1838–1895), Swedish clock maker
- Hilda Pinnix-Ragland (born 1955), American business executive
- H. F. M. Prescott (1896–1972), English author, academic and historian
- Hilda Ramírez (born 1944), Cuban shot putter
- Hilda Ramos (born 1964), Cuban discus thrower
- Hilda Ranscombe (1913–1998), Canadian ice hockey
- Hilda Stewart Reid (1898–1982), English novelist and historian
- Hilda Muhlhauser Richards (1885–1924), American government official
- Hilda Ross (1883–1959), New Zealand politician
- Hilda Runciman, Viscountess Runciman of Doxford (1869–1956), British politician
- Hilda Sachs (1857–1935), Swedish journalist and women's rights activist
- Hilda Sandels (1830–1921), Swedish opera singer
- Hilda Sjölin (1835–1915), Swedish photographer
- Hilda Solis (born 1957), American politician
- Hilda Spong (1875–1955), English actress
- Hilda Crosby Standish (1902–2005), American birth control pioneer
- Hilda Svensson (born 2006), Swedish ice hockey player
- Hilda Tadria, Ugandan women's rights activist
- Hilda Terry (1914–2006), American cartoonist
- Hilda Twongyeirwe, Ugandan writer and editor
- Hilda Vaughan (1892–1985), Welsh writer
- Hilda Vīka (1897–1963), Latvian artist and writer
- Hilda Woodward (1913–1999), British musician
- Hilda Worthington Smith (1888–1984), American educator and poet

== Fictional characters ==
- Hilda, a heroine in Nathaniel Hawthorne’s 1860 novel The Marble Faun
- Hilda, title character in Luke Pearson's Hilda series
- Hilda, the female protagonist of the video game Pokémon Black and White
- Hilda, a minor character on the family television series The Muppet Show
- Hilda or Hildegarde (Beelzebub), a main character in the manga Beelzebub
- Hilda, a pinup girl created by Duane Bryers
- Hilda, the protagonist of the 2022 video game Asterigos: Curse of the Stars
- Hilda, the wife of Horace Rumpole, a character in the book and TV series Rumpole of the Bailey
- Hilda Berg, an airplane boss who can shapeshift into a zeppelin from Cuphead
- Dame Hilda Bracket, half of the opera singing female impersonation act "Hinge and Bracket"
- Hilda Valentine Goneril, a character from the video game Fire Emblem: Three Houses
- Princess Hilda of Lorule, a character from the video game The Legend of Zelda: A Link Between Worlds
- Hilda Ogden, from the British soap opera Coronation Street
- Hilda Scarve, the heroine of the 1842 romantic novel The Miser's Daughter by William Harrison Ainsworth
- Hilda Spellman, a main character in Sabrina, the Teenage Witch
- Hilda Suarez, from the American television series Ugly Betty
- Hilda Van Gleck, a character in Mary Mapes Dodge’s 1865 children’s novel Hans Brinker or the Silver Skates
- Hilda Wade, the heroine of the 1900 crime fiction novel Hilda Wade by author Grant Allen
- "Hot Ice" Hilda, a supporting character in the anime Outlaw Star
- Polaris Hilda, the main antagonist of the Asgard arc in the anime Saint Seiya
- Hilda "Hurricane" Muller, the main protagonist of Brazilian minisseries Hilda Furacão

== Space ==
- 153 Hilda, a large asteroid in the Hilda group in the Solar System, named after one of the discoverer's daughters.

== See also ==
- St. Hilda's (disambiguation)
- Broom-Hilda, U.S. newspaper comic strip created by Russell Myers
