= Hildur =

- Pronunciation: HIL-dur
- Gender: Female
- Language: Icelandic

Origin
- Origin: Hild
- Meaning: Battle
- Region of origin: Iceland, Sweden, Norway

Other names
- Related names: Hilda, Hilde

Hildur is one of several female given names derived from the name Hild formed from Old Norse hildr, meaning "battle". Hild, a Nordic-German Bellona, was a Valkyrie who conveyed fallen warriors to Valhalla. Warfare was often called Hild's Game. Hildur is rather exclusively used in Nordic counties, but the more recent variations with the same origin, Hilda and Hilde, are in wider use. The Swedish name day for Hildur and Hilda is 18 January.

== People ==
- Hildur Alvén (1886–1963), Swedish politician
- Hildur Andersen (1864–1956), Norwegian pianist and music pedagogue
- Hildur Antonsdóttir (born 1995), Icelandic footballer
- Hildur Vala Einarsdóttir (born 1982), Icelandic singer
- Hildur Guðnadóttir (born 1982), Icelandic musician and composer
- Hildur Humla (1889–1969), Swedish politician
- Hildur Elísa Jónsdóttir (born 1993), Icelandic artist, musician, and composer
- Hildur Björg Kjartansdóttir (born 1994), Icelandic basketball player
- Hildur Knútsdóttir (born 1984), Icelandic writer and politician
- Hildur Krog (1922–2014), Norwegian lichenologist
- Hildur María Leifsdóttir (born 1993), Icelandic beauty queen and model
- Hildur Alice Nilson (1924–2014), Swedish jazz and schlager singer, birth name of Swedish singer Alice Babs
- Hildur Nygren (1896–1962), Swedish politician and teacher
- Hildur Horn Øien (born 1940), Norwegian politician
- Hildur Os (1913–2009), Norwegian politician
- Hildur Ottelin (1866–1927), Swedish politician
- Hildur Schirmer (1856–1914), German-Norwegian soprano
- Hildur Sigurðardóttir (born 1981), Icelandic basketball player and coach
- Hildur Sommerfeldt (1830–1892), Norwegian opera singer and pianist
- Hildur Sverrisdóttir (born 1978), Icelandic politician
- Hildur Þorgeirsdóttir (born 1989), Icelandic handball player

== Fictional characters ==
- Hildur Rúnarsdóttir, police officer in the detective novel series by Satu Rämö
