= Hilde (given name) =

- Pronunciation: /ˈhɪldə/
- Gender: Female

Origin
- Origin: Hild
- Meaning: Battle

Other names
- Related names: Hilda, Hildur

Hilde is one of several female given names derived from the name Hild formed from Old Norse hildr, meaning "battle". Hild, a Nordic-German Bellona, was a Valkyrie who conveyed fallen warriors to Valhalla. Warfare was often called Hild's Game. Hilde was popular in Norway from the 1950s until the 1970s. It is a variant of Hilda, which in turn is a more recent variation of Hildur.

Notable people with the name include:

- Hilde Benjamin (1902–1989), East German judge who presided over political show trials
- Hilde Bergebakken (born 1963), Norwegian Socialist Left Party politician
- Hilde De Baerdemaeker (born 1978), Flemish actress
- Hilde Bruch (1904–1984), German-born American psychiatrist and psychoanalyst
- Hilde Coppi (1909–1943), German communist and anti-Nazi resistance fighter
- Hilde Crevits (born 1967), Belgian politician
- Hilde Domin (1909–2006), German lyric poet and writer
- Hilde Gerg (born 1975), German former alpine skier
- Hilde Grande (born 1975), Norwegian politician
- Hilde Güden (1917–1988), Austrian operatic soprano
- Hilde Hagerup (born 1976), Norwegian novelist and children author
- Hilde Haugsgjerd (born 1952), Norwegian newspaper editor
- Hilde Heynen (born 1959), Belgian professor of architectural theory
- Hilde Hildebrand (1897–1976), German actress
- Hilde Himmelweit (1918–1989), German social psychologist
- Hilde Holger (1905–2001), Austrian dancer, choreographer and dance teacher
- Hilde Holovsky (died 1933), Austrian figure skater
- Hilda Mary Hooke (1898–1978), Canadian writer
- Hilde Houben-Bertrand (born 1940), Belgian Flemish politician and former provincial governor of Limburg
- Hilde Hovdenak (born 1971), Norwegian retired long-distance runner
- Hilde Hummelvoll (born 1960), Norwegian television personality
- Hilde Indreberg (born 1957), Norwegian judge
- Hilde Frafjord Johnson (born 1963), Norwegian Christian Democratic Party politician
- Hilde Konetzni (1905–1980), Austrian operatic soprano
- Hilde Körber (1906–1969), German film actress
- Hilde Krahl (1917–1999), Austrian film actress
- Hilde Lauer (born 1943), Romanian Olympic sprint canoer
- Hilde Lindemann, American philosophy professor and bioethicist
- Hilde Lyrån (born 1963), Norwegian actress, dancer, and comedian
- Hilde Lysiak (born 2006), American journalist
- Hilde Magnusson Lydvo (born 1970), Norwegian politician
- Hilde Mangold (1898–1924), German embryologist
- Hilde Marstrander (born 1969), Norwegian fashion journalist and illustrator
- Hilde Meisel (1914–1945), Jewish German socialist, journalist and anti-Nazi resistance member
- Hilde Østbø (born 1974), Norwegian Olympic handball player
- Hilde Gjermundshaug Pedersen (born 1964)
- Hilde Quintens (born 1964), Belgian cyclist
- Hilde Riis (born 1959), Norwegian Olympic cross-country skier
- Hilde Sandvik (born 1970), Norwegian journalist
- Hilde Schrader (1910–1966), German Olympic swimmer
- Hilde Schramm (born 1936), daughter of German architect and war criminal Albert Speer
- Hilde Schutte (born 1996), Dutch undefeated kickboxer with long legs
- Hilde Sherman (1923–2011), German Holocaust survivor and memoirist.
- Hilde Singsaas (born 1972), Norwegian Labour Party politician
- Hilde Krahwinkel Sperling (1908–1981), German tennis player
- Hilde Fålun Strøm, Explorer, polar ambassador and citizen scientist
- Hilde Strømsvold (born 1967), Norwegian football goalkeeper
- Hilde Synnøve Lid (born 1971), Norwegian Olympic freestyle skier
- Hilde Teerlinck (born 1966), Belgian curator
- Hilde Tellesbø (born 1963), Norwegian orienteering competitor
- Hilde Urbaniak (fl. late 1950s), West German slalom canoeist
- Hilde Vogt (born 1945), Norwegian politician
- Hilde Waage (born 1959), Norwegian historian
- Hilde Weissner (1909–1987), German actress
- Hilde Wendel (born 1996), Dutch politician
- Hilde Zach (1942–2011), mayor of Innsbruck, Austria
- Hilde Zadek (1917–2019), German operatic soprano
- Hilde Zaloscer (1903–1999), Austrian art historian, Egyptologist, Coptologist, essayist and novelist
- Hilde Ziegler (1939–1999), German actress
- Hilde Zimmermann (1920–2002), Austrian resistance fighter against Nazism and survivor of the KZ Ravensbrück

== See also ==
- Hilde (disambiguation)
- Hildegard, a female name derived from Old High German hild and gard
- Hildegarde (disambiguation)
