= St. Hilda's College =

St Hilda's College may refer to:

- St Hilda's College, Oxford, one of the constituent colleges of the University of Oxford in the United Kingdom
- St. Hilda's College (University of Toronto), a residence hall of Trinity College, a federated university of the University of Toronto in Canada
- St Hilda's College (University of Melbourne), a residential college at the University of Melbourne in Australia

== See also ==
- St. Hilda's (disambiguation)
