= St. Hilda's =

This is a disambiguation page for the term St. Hilda's. For the root word see: Hilda (disambiguation)

St Hilda's may refer to:

== Religion ==
- Hilda of Whitby is a Christian saint known as St. Hilda
- St. Hilda's Church (disambiguation) is the name of numerous churches.

== Places ==
- St Hilda's, Middlesbrough, now known as Middlehaven, the old part of the town of Middlesbrough

== Education ==
Argentina

- St Hilda's College (Buenos Aires), is a private day school located in Hurlingham, Buenos Aires, Argentina.

Australia

- St Hilda's School, an Anglican day and boarding school for girls from Reception to Year 12, located in the suburb of Southport, Gold Coast Australia.
- St Hilda's Anglican School for Girls, a private day and boarding school located in Mosman Park, Perth, Western Australia
- St Hilda's College (University of Melbourne), a residential college at the University of Melbourne in Australia.

Canada

- St. Hilda's College, Toronto, the women's section of the University of Trinity College, itself a federated College of the University of Toronto in Canada.

Jamaica

- St Hilda's Diocesan High School, located in Brown's Town, Saint Ann Parish.

New Zealand

- St Hilda's Collegiate School, in Dunedin.

Singapore

- Saint Hilda's Primary School, a primary school in Tampines, Singapore.
- Saint Hilda's Secondary School, a secondary school also found in Tampines, Singapore.

United Kingdom

- St Hilda's Church of England High School
- St Hilda's College, Oxford, one of the constituent colleges of the University of Oxford in the United Kingdom.

United States

- St. Hilda's & St. Hugh's, an independent Episcopal elementary school in New York City.
