= Hild =

Hild or Hildr may refer to:

- Hildr or Hild is one of the Valkyries in Norse mythology, a personification of battle
- Hild or Hilda of Whitby is a Christian saint who was a British abbess and nun in the Middle Ages
- Hild (Oh My Goddess!), the ultimate Demon in Hell known as the Daimakaichō in the Oh My Goddess! series
- Hild (novel), a 2013 novel about Hilda of Whitby by Nicola Griffith

== See also ==
- Hilda
- Hilde (disambiguation)
- Hildegard (disambiguation)
- Hildreth (disambiguation)
- Brynhildr
- Brunhilda of Austrasia (543–613)
- Gunhilda (born 10th century),
- Hildebrand
