= Brynhild (given name) =

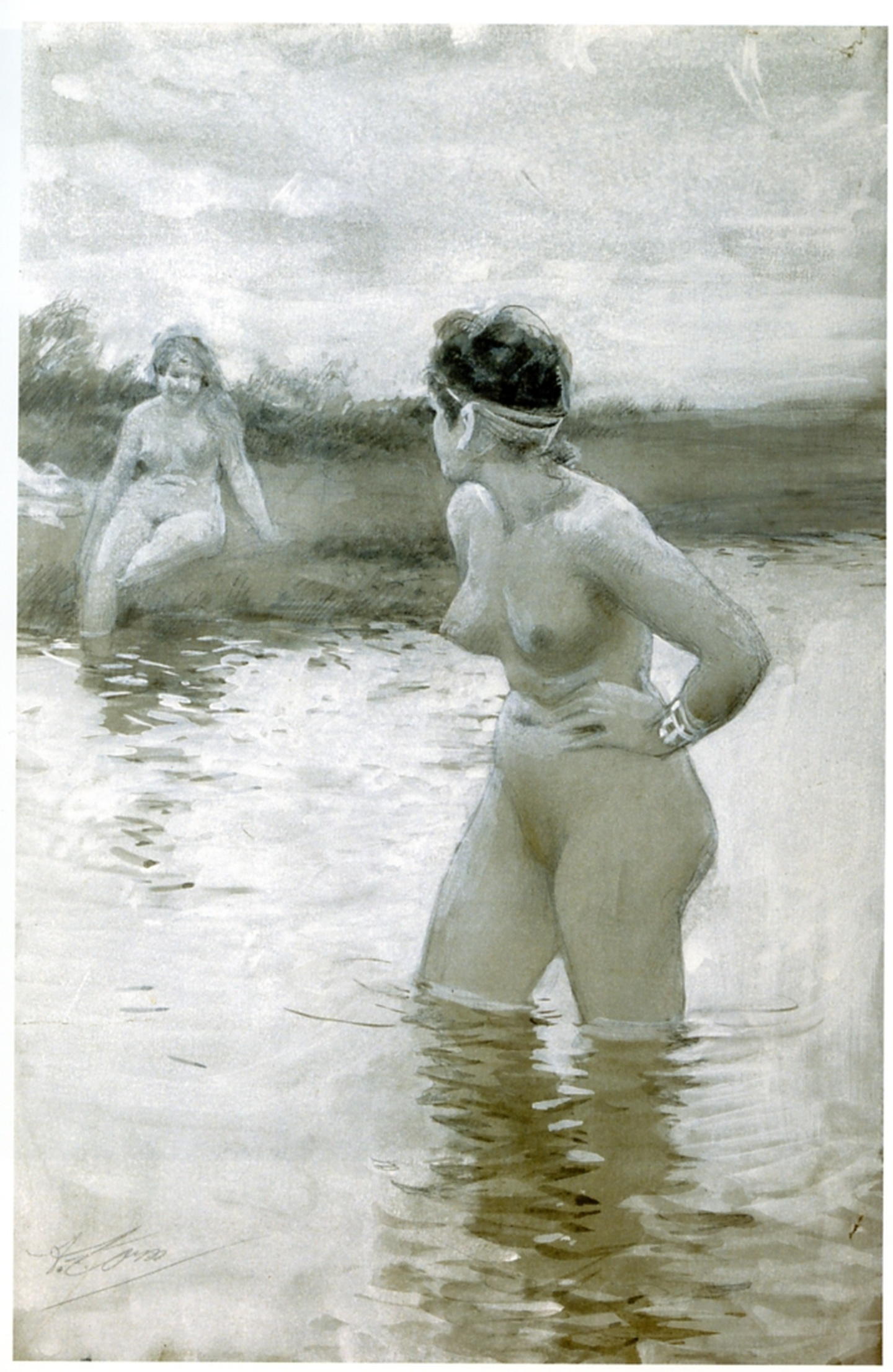
- Brynhild and Gudrun, an illustration from Fredrik Sander's 1893 Swedish edition of the Poetic Edda.
- Gender: Female

Origin
- Origin: Germanic
- Meaning: "battle armor"

Other names
- Related names: Brunhild, Brünhild, Brunhilda, Brunhilde, Brunilda, Brynhildr, Brynhildur

Brynhild is a Norwegian feminine given name, a form of the German Brunhild, a heroine of Germanic heroic legend.

It may refer to:

- Brynhild Berge (1901–1975), Norwegian diver and Olympian
- Brynhild Grasmoen (1929–2000), American alpine skier and Olympian
- Belle Gunness (born Brynhild Paulsdatter Størseth; 1859–1908), Norwegian born American serial killer
- Brynhild Haugland (1905–1998), American politician
- Brynhild Olivier (1887–1935), English aristocrat and Progressive
- Brynhild Parker (1907–1987), British illustrator and painter
- Brynhild Synstnes (born 1971), Norwegian retired long-distance runner

== See also ==
- Brunhilde (given name)
- Brunhilda
- Brynhildur
