= Elbow Creek =

Stream in Taney County, Missouri, U.S.

Elbow Creek is a stream in Taney County, Missouri. The stream headwaters are on the southwest flank of Lime Kiln Mountain within the Mark Twain National Forest. The stream course makes a sharp turn from northeast to southeast about a mile from its source then flows in a meandering fashion south to its confluence with Bull Shoals Lake north of Diamond City which lies across the lake in northern Boone County, Arkansas.

The source is located at: 36°36′56″N 92°56′38″W and the confluence is at: 36°30′03″N 92°55′48″W.

Elbow Creek was so named on account of its irregular course.
