= Marta Sandal =

Norwegian singer (1878–1930)

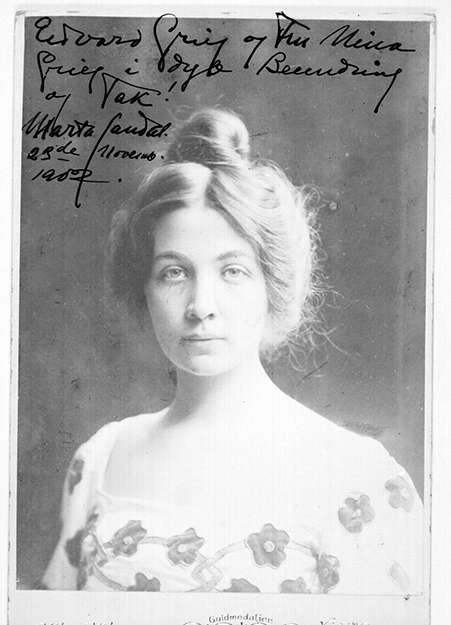
- Marta Sandal in 1902
- Born: Marta Christine Sandal; 31 January 1878; Aker, Norway
- Died: 2 March 1930 (aged 52); Forest City, Iowa
- Spouses: Henri Bramsen (m. 1903); Gudmund Rørtvedt (m. 1914)
- Children: 3

Marta Christine Sandal (31 January 1878 – 2 March 1930) was a Norwegian mezzo-soprano, best known for singing songs by Edvard Grieg.

== Early life ==
Marta Christine Sandal was born on 31 January 1878 in Aker (now Oslo) to Arne Gulbrandsen Sandal (1851–1932) and Amalie Henriette Olsen (1851–1933).

By the age of 12, she had made a name for herself as a singing talent in A. M. Hanche's children's choir. She was a soloist in the choir before King Oscar II, who later facilitated her admission to Music Conservatory in Christiania, where she was mentored by Hildur Schirmer. She then studied in Berlin with Etelka Gerster, followed by a year studying in Paris.

== Career ==
In 1902, she gave her first recital at Sing-Akademie zu Berlin. The same year she also performed a concert of Grieg's songs in Christiania. Sandal also performed songs by Christian Sinding and Sigurd Lie. In 1902, Edvard Munch painted a portrait of Sandal in pastel.

On 6 June 1903, Sandal married cellist Henri Bramsen and performed with him for several years, including in Finland and Saint Petersburg. After receiving a letter of recommendation from Grieg in 1906, Sandal travelled to the United States with her husband, initially settling in Pittsburgh. After their marriage broke up and Bramsen returned to Europe, Sandal remained in the United States and remarried in 1914 to an American farmer of Norwegian origin. She continued to give concerts in the provinces (Iowa, Montana, North Dakota).

== Personal life and death ==
Sandal died on 2 March 1930 in Forest City, at the age of 52. She had 3 daughters.
