= Ruth Elaine Younger =

American nun (1897–1986)

Ruth Elaine Younger (Mother Ruth) (October 1, 1897 - December 22, 1986) was an Anglican nun and the founder of the Community of the Holy Spirit. She was a member of the Sisterhood of St. John the Divine from 1922 to 1952, when she founded the Community of the Holy Spirit. She held the office of Reverend Mother of the community until 1976. Mother Ruth founded St. Hilda's & St. Hugh's School in 1950.

She received her B.A. with honors in natural science from St. Hilda's College, University of Toronto, her M.A. and Ph.D. from Columbia University.

== Works ==
- Religious Teaching Related to Attitudes and Conduct in Episcopal Parish Schools, Diocese of New York: A Study of the Present Curricular Practices in the Area of Religious Beliefs and Moral and Spiritual Values, in Relation to the Attitudes and Conduct of Children in Selected Episcopal Parish Day Schools in the Diocese of New York (Teachers College, Columbia University dissertation, 1952)
- In Wisdom Thou Hast Made Them (Adams, Bannister and Cox, 1986)
