= Marstrander =

Marstrander is a surname. Notable people with the surname include:

- Carl Marstrander (1883–1965), Norwegian linguist
- Hilde Marstrander (born 1969), Norwegian artist, illustrator, and art critic
- Sverre Marstrander (1910–1986), Norwegian professor in archaeology
