= Hilde =

Hilde may refer to:

- Hilde (given name)
- Hilde (film), a 2009 German biopic film
- MV Hilde, a Kriegsmarine coastal tanker
- Tom Hilde (born 1987), Norwegian ski jumper

== Characters ==
- Hilde (Soulcalibur), a character in the Soul series
- Hilde Schbeiker, a character in Mobile Suit Gundam Wing
- Hilde Schmittendorf, minor vilan in Dead Rising 3
- Hilde (7 days), a character in "7 days" mobile game

== See also ==
- Hild (disambiguation)
- Hilda (disambiguation)
