= Brynhildur =

Brynhildur is an Icelandic feminine given name derived from a combination of the Germanic word elements brun, or armor, and hild, or battle. The Valkyrie Brunhild is a heroine of Germanic heroic legend.

Notable people with the name include:

- Brynhildur Davíðsdóttir (born 1968), Icelandic professor
- Brynhildur Þórarinsdóttir (born 1970), Icelandic children's writer

== See also ==
- Brynhild
- Brunhilde (given name)
- Brunhilda
