= Hildreth =

Hildreth may refer to:

== Places ==
- Hildreth, California
- Hildreth, Nebraska
- Hildreth Cemetery in Lowell, Massachusetts

== Other uses ==
- Hildreth (name)
