= St Hilda's Church =

St Hilda's Church may refer to:

- St Hilda's Church, Ampleforth, North Yorkshire, England
- St Hilda's Church, Bilsborrow, Lancashire, England
- St Hilda's Church, Darlington, County Durham, England
- St Hilda's Church, Egton, North Yorkshire, England
- Church of St Hilda, Ellerburn, North Yorkshire, England
- St Hilda's Church, Griffithstown, Torfaen, Wales
- St Hilda's Church, Hartlepool, County Durham, England
- St Hilda's Church, Hinderwell, North Yorkshire, England
- St Hilda's Church, Monkwearmouth, Tyne and Wear, England
- St Hilda's Church, South Shields, Tyne and Wear, England
- St Hilda's Church, Southwick, Tyne and Wear, England
- St Hilda's Church, Sunderland, Tyne and Wear, England

== See also ==
- St. Hilda's (disambiguation)
