= Brunhilda =

Brunhilda may refer to:

- Brunhild, a figure in Germanic heroic legend
- Brunhilda of Austrasia (c. 543–613), Frankish queen
- Brunhilda (bird), a genus of birds

== See also ==
- Broom-Hilda, an American newspaper comic strip
- Broomhilda Von Shaft, a character in the 2012 film Django Unchained
- Brunilda à La Plata
- Brunhilde (given name)
