= Hildur Sommerfeldt =

Norwegian opera singer and pianist

Hildur Sommerfeldt (1830 – 16 May 1892) was a Norwegian-German opera singer, pianist and music teacher.

== Family ==
Sommerfeldt was married to the German engineer and accountant August Koch. They were the parents of singer, singing teacher and women's rights activist Hildur Schirmer, who married the architect Adolf Schirmer. Their son Oscar Koch, concertmaster in Bremen, married Betsy Gude, a daughter of the painter Hans Gude. Her last name is also spelled Sommerfelt.

== Life and work ==
Sommerfeldt came to Leipzig in the late 1840s, where she studied for two years at the music conservatory which in 1843 had been established by Felix Mendelssohn, with Mendelssohn and Mocheles as teachers. On 26 June 26, 1848, she assisted at a concert by cellist Cipriano Romberg. On November 17 of the same year, she gave her own concert about pianist. This is probably her performance of Mendelssohn's G minor concerto in Bergen. In Bergen, she also taught piano playing and singing. The former for 60 skillings per hour, the latter for 48.

On 15 April 1849, she was employed as a singer at Christiania Theater. There, she debuted on 21 April 1849 in the role of Zerlina in Fra Diavolo. In December of the same year, she took on the role of Carlo Broschi in Farinelli' operetta La part du diable.

However, she did not succeed in any major breakthrough in Christiania, and thus traveled back to Leipzig to study further. However, she gave up her further career when she got married. She then settled in Braunschweig.

== Roles ==
- Zerlina in From Diavolo by Daniel Auber and Eugène Scribe (Christiania Theater)
- Carlo Broschi in La part du diable by Daniel Auber and Eugène Scribe (Christiania Theater)

== Sources ==
- Qvamme, Børre (1998). Halfdan Kjerulf and his time. Solum. ISBN 8256011548.
