= Linnet (novel) =

1898 novel by Grant Allen

- Author: Grant Allen
- Language: English
- Genre: Romance
- Publisher: Grant Richards (London); New Amsterdam Book Co. (New York)
- Publication date: 1898
- Publication place: United Kingdom
- Media type: Print (Hardcover)

Linnet is a romance novel by Grant Allen, published in 1898. Set in the Tyrol region of the Alps and in London, the novel contrasts the simplicity of rural Alpine life with the sophisticated urban environment of England. It follows the rise of a Tyrolean peasant girl with a "marvelous voice" who becomes a celebrated singer, and the romantic entanglements that ensue between her, her exploitative manager, and an English poet.

== Plot summary ==
Two English tourists, Will Deverill and Florian Wood, arrive in a small mountain village in Austria's Zillertal valley. Deverill is a quiet, undemonstrative poet, while Wood is a cynical, worldly critic. They encounter the local villagers and their simple way of life. Among the villagers is Linnet, a modest young woman who tends cows in the summer and works in the village during the winter. She possesses an extraordinary singing voice and is a devout Catholic. Both Englishmen are charmed by Linnet; she is charmed by Deverill. However, Wood persuades Deverill of the social and practical folly of a romance with a peasant girl, and convinces him to leave the Tyrol.

After the Englishmen depart, Linnet attracts the attention of Andreas Hausberger, a taciturn local innkeeper and zither player who manages minstrel troupes. Viewing Linnet as a business investment, Hausberger marries her—despite her lack of romantic affection for him—to secure control over her talent. He trains her and takes her on tour as a professional singer. Linnet achieves great fame, and eventually the troupe travels to London. She encounters Deverill again, who has since become a successful playwright. Their love is rekindled, but they are kept apart by Linnet's religious commitment to her marriage, despite her husband's greed and cruelty.

A former admirer of Linnet from her native village, Franz Lindner, has also followed her path. At the novel's conclusion, he murders Hausberger, freeing Linnet from her oppressive marriage. After a period of mourning and the acquisition of a Papal dispensation, Linnet and Deverill are finally free to marry.

== Reception ==
The Reader's Digest of Books (1929) described the book's presentation of country life as "effective and pleasing", and praised the contrast drawn between Tyrol and London. The Spectator described it as "not a novel with a purpose, or a problem, but simply a sensational romance", contrasting it with "the rarefied moral atmosphere" of Allen's other writing.
