= Princess Hilda =

Princess Hilda may refer to:

- Princess Hilda of Anhalt-Dessau (1839–1926), daughter of Prince Frederick Augustus of Anhalt-Dessau
- Princess Hilda of Luxembourg (1897–1979), daughter of William IV, Grand Duke of Luxembourg
- Princess Hilda of Nassau (1864–1952), daughter of Adolphe, Grand Duke of Luxembourg
- Princess Hildegard of Bavaria (1825–1864), daughter of Ludwig I of Bavaria
