= Sunniva Sorby =

Sunniva Sorby is an expeditioner, historian, guide, citizen scientist, and Fellow of the Royal Canadian Geographical Society. She is best known for her membership of the first women's team to reach the south pole in 1993.

== Biography ==
Sorby was born in Tønsberg, Norway and raised in Canada. She completed her BA economics at Bishop's University in Lennoxville, Canada. She is an experienced expeditioner, historian, guide, citizen scientist, and Fellow of the Royal Canadian Geographical Society.

=== Polar engagement ===
Sorby works as a guide and historian of Antarctica, having visited the continent more than 100 times and also having skied across the Greenland icecap, across King George Island, Antarctica, and skied to the South Pole. Her journey to the South Pole, which she reached on 14 January 1993, was as a member of the first women's team (under the leadership of Ann Bancroft) to do so.

Sorby co-founded Hearts in the Ice, a social media project aimed at engagement on climate change and together with Norwegian Hilde Fålun Strøm, is the first woman to over-winter in Svalbard without men. Focusing on the smallest possible carbon footprint while overwintering on Svalbard, Sorby and Strøm intend to pioneer the use of an electric snowmobile, and keep packaging of supplies to a minimum. Their overwintering period, running from August 2019 to May 2020, will be spent at 78°N in a 20 m^{2} cabin called Bamsebu and their experience broadcast via social media.
