= Hylda =

Hylda may refer to:

- Hylda Baker (1905–1986), British comedian, actress and music hall star
- Hylda Queally (born 1961), Irish talent agent in the Hollywood film industry

== See also ==
- Hilda (disambiguation)
