= Asterigos: Curse of the Stars =

- Developer: Acme Gamestudio
- Publisher: TinyBuild
- Platforms: PlayStation 4, PlayStation 5, Xbox One, Xbox Series X/S, Windows
- Release: October 11, 2022
- Genre: Hack and slash
- Mode: Single-player

Asterigos: Curse of the Stars is a third-person hack and slash role-playing video game with soulsborne elements, developed by Acme Gamestudio and published by TinyBuild. The game was released for PlayStation 4, PlayStation 5, Windows, Xbox One, and Xbox Series X/S on October 11, 2022. Set in a fantasy world, it follows a young woman named Hilda, who travels to Aphes, a cursed city that is stuck in time, to find her missing father and tribespeople.

Asterigos received positive reviews from critics, who praised its graphics, combat and story, but thought the game lacked polish, with inconsistent voiced scenes and overly easy bosses.

== Reception ==
Reception

Aggregate scores
Aggregator	Score
Metacritic	73/100 (PC); 76/100 (PS5); 75/100 (X/S)
OpenCritic	54% recommend

Review scores
Publication	Score
Hardcore Gamer	3.5/5
RPGamer	3.5/5

Asterigos: Curse of the Stars received "generally favorable" reviews from critics, except for the PC version which received "mixed or average" reviews, according to review aggregator website Metacritic. Fellow review aggregator OpenCritic assessed that the game received fair approval, being recommended by 54% of critics.

Ryan Costa of RPGamer called the game's scope expansive, but criticizing the lack of lip sync during dialog as immersion breaking. He remarked that the game was both beautiful and had a strong combat system, but that leveling up could make bosses too easy, and some quest items were overly obtuse to find. Describing the game as tough, he nevertheless called it approachable, saying that it never felt unfair. Adam Vitale of RPGSite said that he enjoyed the game more than he expected to, although he called its dialog excessive and its translation awkward, also criticizing the fact that the game was only partially voiced. He described the narrative as conceptually interesting, but with a flawed execution. He praised the game's art style and aesthetics, calling them "respectable" and "charming". Keigo Kino of IGN Japan called its graphics and music excellent, but noted that the combat felt "cheap", like an "unbalanced Soulsborne title".

Reviewing Asterigos' PlayStation 5 version, Chris Shive of Hardcore Gamer called it challenging, but more accessible than most Soulslikes. He said that while the gameplay was enjoyable, there was "room for more polish", and that, since it tries to combine traditional RPGs and Souls games, it would not totally appeal to fans of either, but could be a "good time" to those without a "purist" mentality.
