= Hilde Sherman =

Holocaust survivor

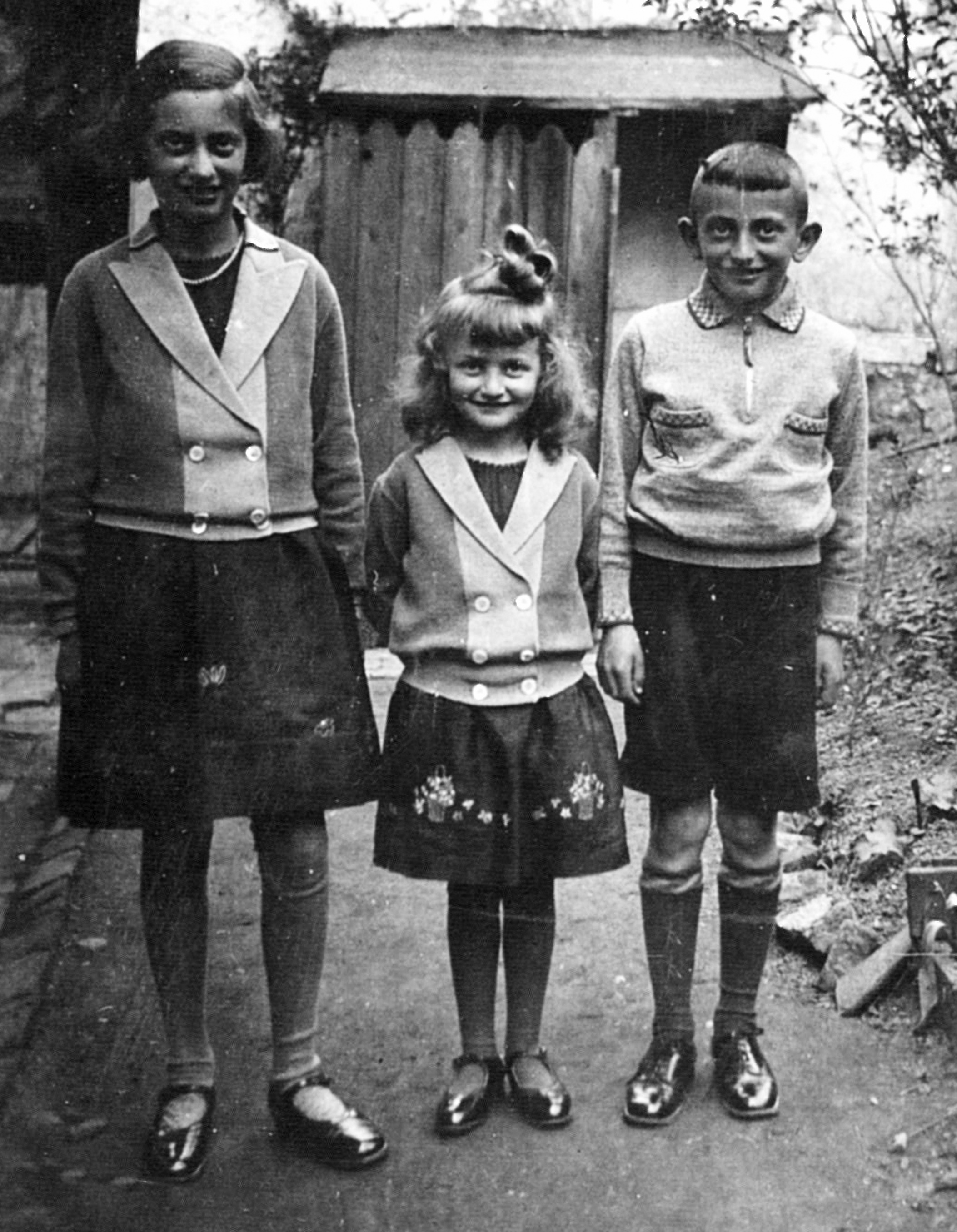
- Hilde Sherman (left) with her siblings, Ruth and Herbert, who were both murdered in the holocaust.
- Born: Hilde Zander; 22 March 1923; Wanlo, Germany
- Died: 11 March 2011 (aged 87); Jerusalem, Israel

Hilde Sherman (born Hilde Zander to parents Albert Zander and Paula Wiesenfelder) was a Holocaust survivor, Jewish community leader, and author. She was born in Wanlo, Germany on March 22, 1923 and had two younger siblings, Herbert and Ruth. In December 1941, at just 18 years old, she was deported to the Riga Ghetto, where she met William Sherman. They married after World War II in Cali, Colombia and had two daughters, Lillian Paula and Ruth Henrietta.

In 1982, she published the first edition of her memoir in German, Zwischen Tag und Dunkel : Mädchenjahre im Ghetto. A later edition was published in 1984, Entre Luz y Tinieblas, a Spanish translation. An English translation is in progress.

Hilde cared profoundly about Holocaust remembrance, sharing her experiences with Yad Vashem to contribute to oral history records, and lending her story for educational materials. She retired in Jerusalem, Israel, where she died on March 11, 2011.

== Works ==
- Entre luz y tinieblas, Cali 1982, ISBN 9589513719
- Zwischen Tag und Dunkel, Mädchenjahre im Ghetto, Frankfurt am Main 1984, ISBN 3-548-20386-8
