= Hilda, Missouri =

Unincorporated community in Missouri, U.S.

Coordinates: 36°39′49″N 92°58′55″W

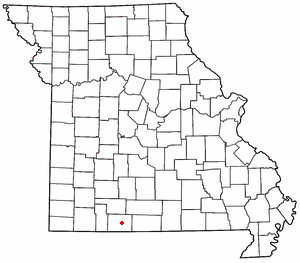

Hilda is an unincorporated community within the Mark Twain National Forest District in Taney County, Missouri, United States. It is located on U.S. Route 160 three miles east of the Kissee Mills recreation area on the Beaver Creek arm of Bull Shoals Lake and approximately twenty miles east of Branson.

The federally-designated, 13,000 acre Hercules Glades Wilderness Area lies one mile east of Hilda. The site of the former Hilda Lookout Tower is approximately one mile south on Lime Kiln Mountain. Hilda is part of the Branson Micropolitan Statistical Area.

A post office called Hilda was established in 1896, and remained in operation until 1975. An early postmaster gave the community the first name of his wife, Hilda Mosely.

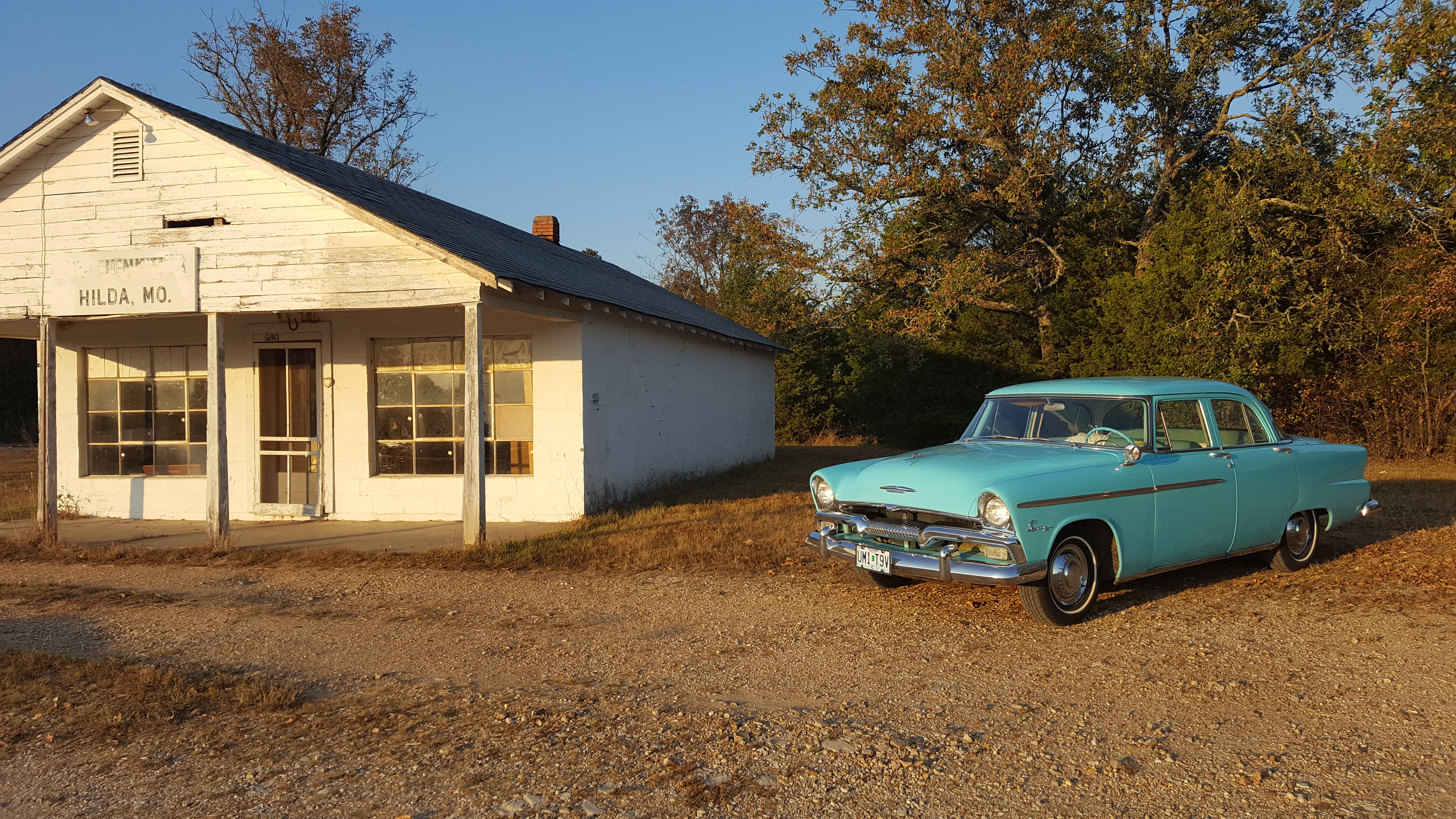
Hilda in 2018
