= Brunhilde Sonntag =

German composer (1936–2002)

Brunhilde Sonntag (27 September 1936 – 18 December 2002) was a German composer, musicologist and music teacher.

== Biography ==
Brunhilde Sonntag was born in Kassel, Germany. She studied organ at the School of Church Music in Schlüchtern and education at the Pedagogical Institute Jugenheim. From 1959 to 1963 she worked as a teacher at the Friedrich Ebert School in Frankfurt and took private composition lessons from Kurt Hessenberg. From 1963 to 1969 she studied composition at the Hochschule for Music and Performing Arts in Vienna with Otto Siegl and Gottfried von Einem, and took a teaching position in the Department of Music of the Justus Liebig University, Giessen.

From 1973 to 1977 Sonntag studied musicology at the Philipps-University in Marburg, and graduated with a PhD. She took a position as assistant professor at the College of Education Westfalen-Lippe, Münster Department. From 1981 to 1992 she worked as a professor for applied music theory at the University-GH-Duisburg, and in 1992 took a position as professor at the University of Wuppertal.

Sonntag published a number of books and professional articles on music. She served as co-editor of the Journal of Music Education, co-editor of the cultural magazine Sound Tracks, and editor of a series on music, art and consumerism in LIT Verlag, Münster.

== Works ==
Sonntag composed for orchestra, chamber ensemble, voice, choir, and solo instrument. Selected works include:

- Auf einem Baum ein Kuckuck saß, cantata (1958)
- Wenn die Tale blühn, choral cantata (1958)
- Christ ist erstanden (1958)
- Hausbau-Stück for piano (1959)
- Schädelvariationen for soprano and piano (1967/68)
- Fantasie und Fuge über EGAH for organ (1976)
- Vier Klavierstücke (1978/1981)
- EKG, collage (1981)
- Der tragische Tausendfüßler (1981)
- Hallelujah! Variationen über "Oh, when the Saints go marching in" for soprano, clarinet and piano (1981)
- Briefe an Verleger, song for tenor and piano (1981)
- Kume, kum, Geselle min for organ (1982)
- Von guten Mächten (setting "Von guten Mächten" by Bonhoeffer) for choir a cappella (1982)
- Fünf Lieder with text from Paul Celan and Rose Ausländer for soprano and piano (1983)
- Verwandlungen Studie for orchestra (1983)
- Aber ich sage Euch: Liebet Eure Feinde for choir, speaker and organ (1983)
- Flötenspiel song with test from H. Hesse (1984)
- Drei Miniaturen for oboe, clarinet, trumpet (1984)
- Fünf Miniaturen for organ (1984)
- Streichquartett (1984)
- Stagnationen trio for flute, horn and cello (1986)
- Spiegelungen for piano (with text) (1987)
- Akrostichon for solo guitar (1987)
- Tefilla for piano (1987)
- Wiegenlied für Stefan for guitar solo (1988)
- Drei Lieder with text from Ulla Hahn for soprano and piano (1988)
- ANIMUS 2 for string quartet (1988)
- FARBENKUGEL for organ (1988)
- Et vitam venturi saeculi for organ (1988)
- DIALOG for guitar duo (1989)
- O Tod, wie bitter bist du for orchestra (1991)
- Fünf Lieder with Japanese text for soprano and guitar (1991)
- Rote Bänder for guitar duo (1991)
- Danse fatale for violin and accordion (1991)
- Fünf Lieder with text from Busta for soprano and guitar (1991)
- SOLO für Esther for solo cello (1991)
- Dein Schweigen ist groß text from R. Ausländer and M. Jaroschka choir a cappella (1991)
- Wie grau es auch regnet three songs with text from G. Eich for soprano, oboe, flute and guitar (1992)
- Als wär's ein Engel for piano (1992)
- LAUDATE for tenor, violin and organ (1992)
- Musik for string quartet (1992)
- Studie for flute, oboe, clarinet, violin, viola, and cello (1993)
- Es ist ein Schnitter, heißt der Tod for string quartet (1993)
- IRRITATIONEN song with text from J.v. Eichendorff, R.M. Rilke, H. Hesse, E. Burkart for mezzo soprano and piano (1994)
- DIE MÖVE JONATHAN for string quartet, flute, oboe, clarinet, trumpet and piano (1994)
- IRRITATIONEN with text from J.v. Eichendorff, R.M. Rilke, H. Hesse. E. Burkart for soprano, string quartet, flute, oboe, piano and guitar (1994)
- JAKOB LITTNERS AUFZEICHNUNGEN AUS EINEM ERDLOCH (W. Koeppen), music for speaker, string quartet, flute, oboe, trumpet and piano (1994)
- Bist ein Weinen in der Welt, songs with text from Else Lasker-Schüler for soprano and piano (1994)
- Zwei Klavierstücke (1994)
- Münchner Flötenduo for Elisabeth and Edmund Weinzierl-Wächter (1995)
- Ein trauriger Tag songs with text from Marta Krutul (1995)
- SHALOM (1995)
