= Hilda (disambiguation) =

Hilda is a feminine given name. It may also refer to:

== Places ==
- Hilda, Kentucky, an unincorporated community in Rowan County, Kentucky
- Hilda, Taney County, Missouri, an unincorporated community
- Hilda, South Carolina, a town
- Hilda, Texas, an unincorporated community
- Hilda, Alberta, Canada, a hamlet
- 153 Hilda, a large asteroid
- Hilda group, a group of asteroids

== Other uses ==
- Tropical Storm Hilda (disambiguation), various storms in the Atlantic, Pacific and Indian Oceans
- SS Hilda, a steamship
- Household, Income and Labour Dynamics in Australia Survey, a panel dataset
- Hilda, name used by the South African Defence Force for the Tiger Cat variant of the Sea Cat missile system
- Hilda asteroid, a class of asteroids associated with the orbit of Jupiter
- Hilda (graphic novel series), a British children's graphic novel series by Luke Pearson
  - Hilda (TV series), a British-Canadian-American animated television series based on the graphic novel series of the same name
