= Hilde Fålun Strøm =

Explorer, polar ambassador and citizen scientist

Hilde Fålun Strøm is from Svalbard, Norway and is an explorer, polar ambassador and citizen scientist with over 20 years experience working in the polar regions. In 2017, with Sunniva Sorby, she started Hearts in the Ice, a platform for social engagement around citizen science and climate change.

== Polar experience ==
She has netted over 60k km (equal to one trip around the globe) on a snowmobile and has had more than 200 polar bear encounters

Strøm co-founded Hearts in the Ice, a social media project aimed at engagement on climate change and together with Canadian Sunniva Sorby. They are the first women to over-winter in Svalbard without men. Focusing on the smallest possible carbon footprint while overwintering on Svalbard, Sorby and Strøm pioneer the use of an electric snowmobile, and keep packaging of supplies to a minimum. Their consecutive overwintering periods, running from August 2019 to September 2021, will be spent at 78°N in a 20 m2 cabin called Bamsebu and their experience broadcast via social media.

Hilde and Sunniva remain in Bamsebu during the COVID-19 global pandemic.
