= St. Hilda's & St. Hugh's School =

Episcopal school in Manhattan, New York

Coordinates: 40°48′26.37″N 73°57′57.59″W

St. Hilda’s & St. Hugh’s

Location
- 619 West 114th Street; New York City, NY; United States

Information
- Type: Episcopal day school
- Established: 1950
- Headmaster: Virginia Connor
- Faculty: 99
- Grades: two- or three-day Beginners (age 2) – grade 8
- Enrollment: 393
- Colors: Blue and white
- Athletics: NYCAL
- Mascot: Hawks!!
- Accreditation: NYSAIS
- Website: sthildas.org

St. Hilda's & St. Hugh's School is an independent, Episcopal day school in New York City. It is located in Morningside Heights on the Upper West Side of Manhattan. The youngest students are beginners (2 or 3 years old), and students graduate when they complete eighth grade.

== History ==
St. Hilda's & St. Hugh's (SHSH) was founded 1950 by Sister Edith Margaret and the Reverend Mother Ruth (Ruth Elaine Younger).

In 1992, SHSH's board of trustees made the decision to close SHSH's upper school (grades 9 through 12) at the end of the 1992–93 school year.

== Curriculum ==
Accredited by NYSAIS, St. Hilda's & St. Hugh's follows a classical liberal arts curriculum. Students begin second language study at the nursery level, with instruction three or more days a week. Parents select from Spanish, French, or Mandarin Chinese. Latin is compulsory and added in seventh grade.
Art and music instruction begin in early childhood. Formal performing arts curriculum begins in fourth grade.

Daily physical education begins in senior kindergarten. Weekly movement classes take place in beginners, nursery, and junior kindergarten. The school is a member of the sports consortium NYCAL. In middle school students may participate in the following team sports: soccer, track and field, volleyball, cross-country, basketball, softball, baseball. Noncompetitive sports offerings for grades 7–8 include yoga, dance, and martial arts.

== Traditions ==
Community service projects take place throughout each academic year and involve students in all grades. Among the school's more notable community service traditions is the Thanksgiving Food Chain, which takes place the day before Thanksgiving each year. Students line up and pass food donations from hand to hand down the block to Broadway Presbyterian Church, which maintains a food pantry and soup kitchen.

In 2006, in the aftermath of the 2004 Indian Ocean earthquake and tsunami, St. Hilda's & St. Hugh's helped to rebuild a school in Chengalpattu, India, now called CSI St. Hilda's & St. Hugh's. Enrollment now exceeds 1,000 students, many of whom are members of the Dalit community, who would not previously have had access to formal education.

In 2014, St. Hilda's & St. Hugh's began a pilot program to work with St. Pierre Community School in Madras, Haiti, a northern fishing village.

A uniform consisting of a white shirt and blue or plaid skirt for girls, and tan pants for boys, is compulsory for students in grades 1–8.

Upper division students (grades 4–8) attend Eucharist on Thursday, and students in grades 1–8 attend Chapel on all other days.

Every year, the school presents a Christmas pageant that was written by Madeleine L’Engle, the renowned author of a Wrinkle in Time, who was a member of the faculty when the novel was published. All students from nursery through 8th grade participate in the pageant, which is always held on the last day before Christmas break.

== Facility ==
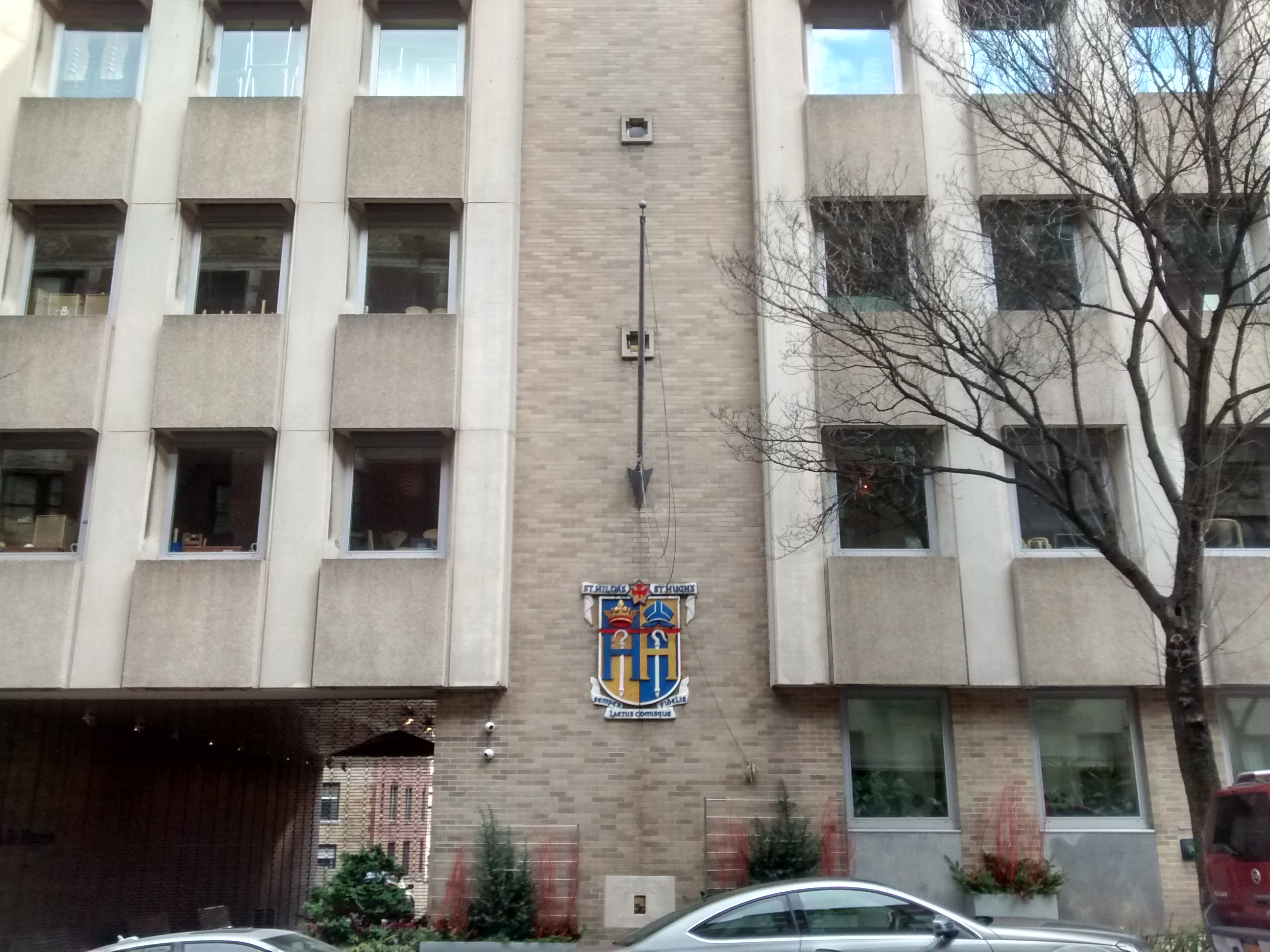

The current school building is an 80,000-square-foot self-contained campus that was constructed in 1967. A series of renovations since 2004 have earned awards for education design including a 2014 Architizer Award for Architecture + Learning. Building features include:

- Interactive technology in every classroom (grades senior kindergarten and up)
- Micro-kitchens in classrooms through fifth grade
- Three age-appropriate science labs
- 500 sq. foot rooftop greenhouse
- 2,600 sq. foot library with nearly 25,000 volumes
- 7,400 sq. foot outdoor playdeck with age-appropriate play zones
- Regulation-size gymnasium with stage
- 1,100 sq. foot indoor play space with climbing wall
- Three art studios with kiln, etching press, and woodworking shop
- Chapel with restored Rieger organ
- Three music studios

== Notable alumni ==
- Fiona Apple, singer/songwriter
- Evan Flatow, orthopedic surgeon-scientist
- Anthony Michael Hall, actor
- Coral Peña, actor
- Adam Rafferty, fingerstyle guitarist
