= Hilda Jesser =

Austrian artist and designer

Hilda Jesser (1894 – 1985) was an Austrian artist and designer whose work is held in the Smithsonian Design Museum and the Toledo Museum of Art. She specialized in ceramics, commercial graphics, glass, embroidery and metalwork.

== Biography ==
Jesser was born in 1894 in Marburg an der Drau. Her father was the chief superintendent of the Südbahn Railway Company. In 1912, she enrolled as a guest student at the Wiener Kunstgewerbeschule (Vienna's University of Applied Arts) and became a full student in 1914. She studied fabric and fashion design and practical skills in lace-making and embroidery.

Jesser was a member of the Wiener Werkstätte, a group of artists based in Vienna, and she created works for the group from 1916 to 1922. She designed ceramics and textiles (including lace, embroidery, and printed fabrics), interior decoration, glass, china, leather goods, and industrial designs. Her ceramic pieces are characterized by an emphasis on usability and a deliberate reduction in colour and décor.

In 1922, Jesser was appointed assistant professor at the Wiener Kunstgewerbeschule, and she became a full professor in 1935. However, in 1938, she was forced to retire by the National Socialists. After World War II ended in 1945, she resumed her position at the Kunstgewerbeschule.

Jesser's work has been featured in two group exhibitions: the first in 2021, titled "Women Artists Of The Wiener Werkstatte," held at the Museum of Applied Arts in Vienna, and the second in 2022, called "Regard! Art and Design by Women 1880–1940," held at Bröhan Museum in Berlin, Germany.
