= Hildur Alvén =

Swedish politician (1886–1963)

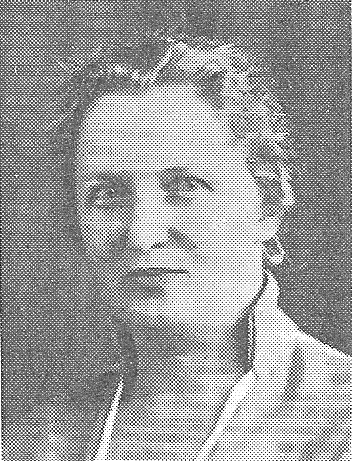
Hildur Alvén SPA3 (cropped)

Hildur Maria Alvén, née Törnell (4 April 1886 - 29 May 1963) was a Swedish politician (Swedish Social Democratic Party). Hildur Alvén was an MP of the Second Chamber of the Parliament of Sweden for Kopparberg in 1937–1948.

Alvén was born to the painter Carl Gustaf Törnell and Hulda Amalia Anell. She was a student at the Brunnsvik folk school in 1915–1916.

She was a member of the International Organisation of Good Templars in 1906–1915, of Social Democratic Women in Sweden from 1926, of the Board of education of Domnarvet in Borlänge in 1929, and of the board of the Folk school of Fornby in Dalarna in 1937. She became MP of the Second Chamber for Kopparberg in 1937. She was a member of the Kopparberg County Health and Hospital committee in 1940.
