= Hildur Ottelin =

Swedish politician (1866–1927)

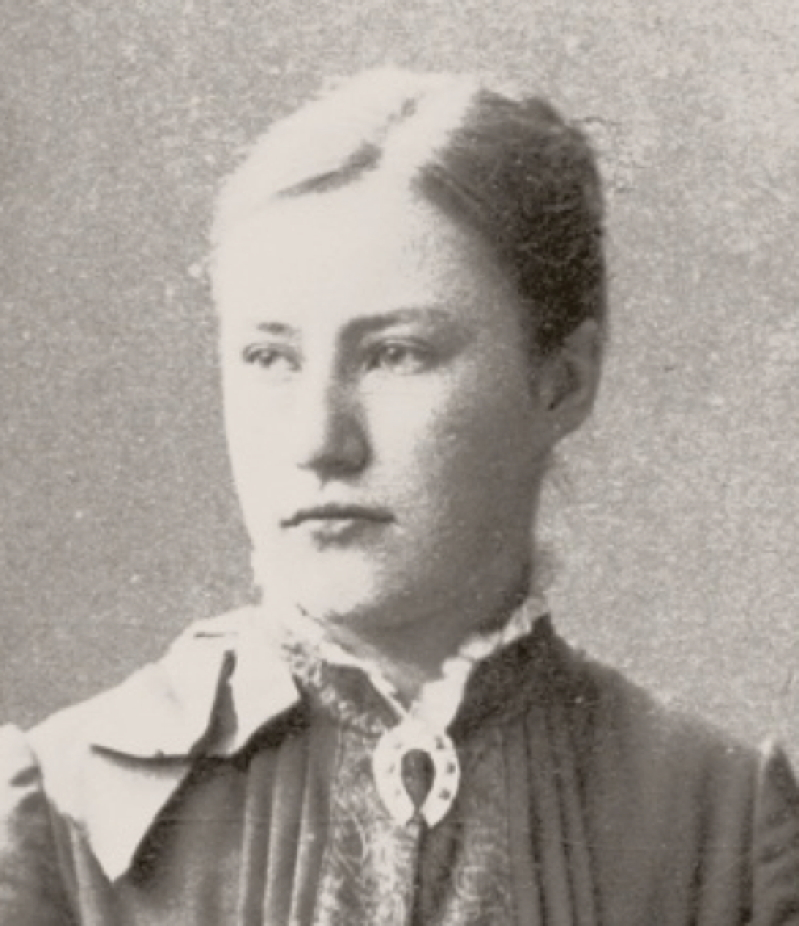
Hildur Ottelin

Hildur Ottelin (1866-1927) was a Swedish politician (Social Democrat).

She worked as Gymnastics schoolteacher.

She was the first woman to be elected to the Uppsala City Council in 1912–1927. She was foremost engaged in the local social politics, particular in the issue of public housing. She became known as an important figure within public housing politics.
