= Hilde Bergebakken =

Norwegian politician (born 1963)

Hilde Bergebakken (born 2 January 1963) is a Norwegian politician for the Socialist Left Party.

She served as a deputy representative to the Norwegian Parliament from Sør-Trøndelag during the term 1993–1997. In total she met during 11 days of parliamentary session.
