= Grant Allen =

Canadian-born science and fiction writer (1848–1899)

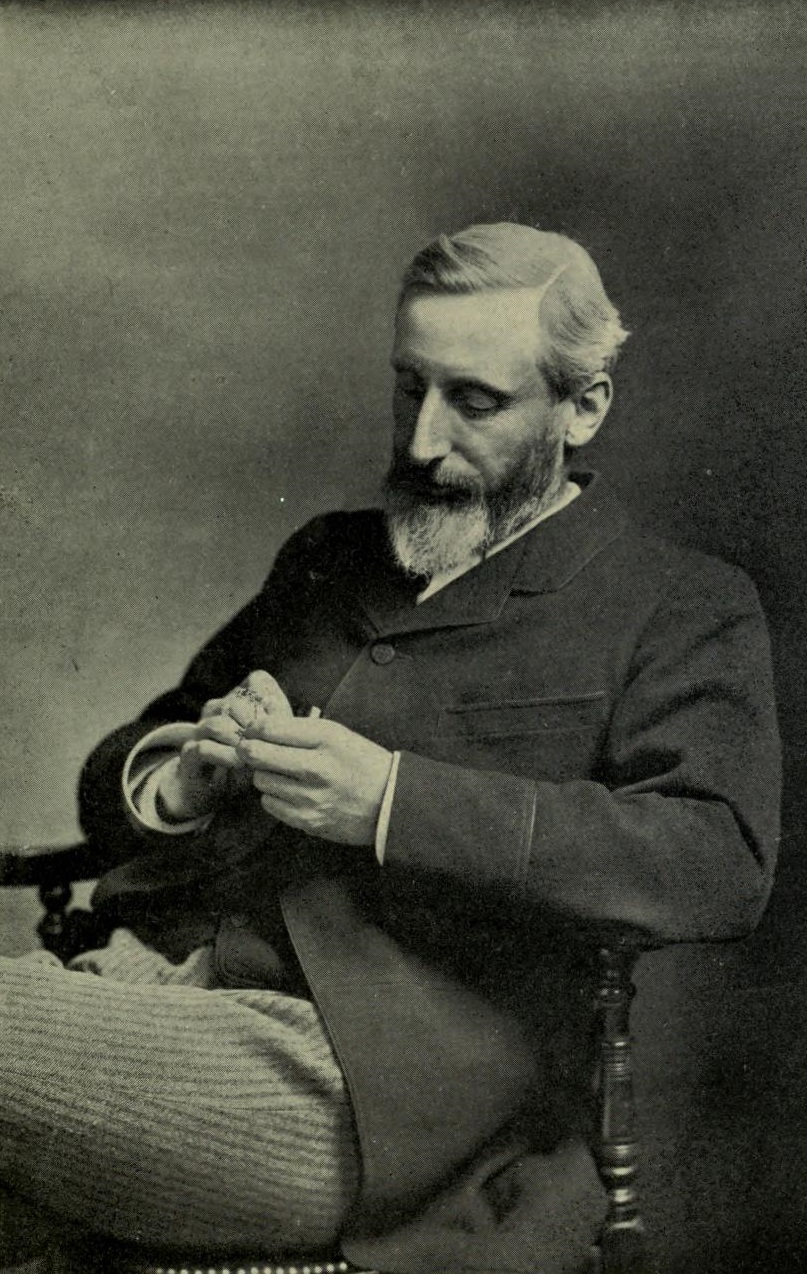
- Portrait of Grant Allen, by Elliott & Fry
- Born: Charles Grant Blairfindie Allen; 24 February 1848; Wolfe Island near Kingston, Canada West
- Died: 25 October 1899 (aged 51); Hindhead, Haslemere, England
- Education: Oxford
- Occupation: Writer
- Spouses: Caroline Anne Bootheway (m. 1868; died 1872) Ellen Jerrard (m. 1873)
- Children: 1
- Writing career
- Notable works: The Woman Who Did; The Evolution of the Idea of God; The British Barbarians

Charles Grant Blairfindie Allen (February 24, 1848 – October 25, 1899) was a Canadian science writer and novelist, educated in England. He was a public promoter of evolution in the second half of the nineteenth century.

== Early life, family and education ==
Allen was born at Alwington near Kingston, Canada West (known as Ontario after Confederation), the second son of Charlotte Grant and the Rev. Joseph Antisell Allen, a Protestant minister from Dublin, Ireland. His mother was a daughter of the fifth Baron de Longueuil. Allen was educated at home until, at age 13, he and his parents moved to the United States, then to France, and finally to the United Kingdom. He was educated in the UK, at King Edward's School in Birmingham and at Merton College in Oxford.

After graduation, Allen studied in France.

== Career ==
=== Instructor ===
Allen taught at Brighton College in 1870–71. In his mid-twenties, he became a professor at Queen's College, a black college in Jamaica. Despite being the son of a minister, Allen became an atheist and a socialist.

=== Writer ===
After leaving his professorship, in 1876 he returned to England, where he turned his talents to writing, gaining a reputation for his essays on science and for literary works. A 2007 book by Oliver Sacks cites with approval one of Allen's early articles, "Note-Deafness" (a description of what became known as amusia, published in 1878 in the learned journal Mind).

Allen's first books dealt with scientific subjects, and include Physiological Æsthetics (1877) and Flowers and Their Pedigrees (1886) He was first influenced by associationist psychology as expounded by Alexander Bain and by Herbert Spencer, the latter who especially espoused the transition from associationist psychology to Darwinian functionalism. In Allen's many articles on flowers and on perception in insects, Darwinian arguments replaced the old Spencerian terms. Allen argued that evolution in color sense linked flowers to insects and birds, and mammals to humans. This led to a radically new vision of plant life that influenced H.G. Wells and helped transform later botanical research. The 1892 edition of the book was supported by both Darwin and Spencer. It attacked Hugo Magnus’s idea that color sense had developed in historical times due to old literature only having simple color names.

On a personal level, a long friendship that started when Allen met Spencer on his return from Jamaica grew uneasy over the years. Allen wrote a critical and revealing biographical article on Spencer that was published after Spencer's death.

After assisting Sir W. W. Hunter with his Gazetteer of India in the early 1880s, Allen turned his attention to fiction. Between 1884 and 1899, he wrote about 30 novels. In 1895, his scandalous book The Woman Who Did, promulgating certain startling views on marriage and kindred questions, became a bestseller. The book told the story of an independent woman who has a child out of wedlock. Owing to his concern with these subjects, Allen was associated with Thomas Hardy, whose novel Jude the Obscure (1895) was published the same year as The Woman Who Did.

In his career, Allen wrote two novels under female pseudonyms. One of these, the short novel The Type-writer Girl, he wrote under the name Olive Pratt Rayner.

Another work, The Evolution of the Idea of God (1897), propounds a theory of religion on heterodox lines comparable to Herbert Spencer's "ghost theory". Allen's theory became well known. Brief references to it appear in a review by Marcel Mauss, Durkheim's nephew, in the articles of William James, and in the works of Sigmund Freud. G. K. Chesterton wrote on what he considered the flawed premise of the idea, arguing that the idea of God preceded human mythologies, rather than developing from them. Chesterton said of Allen's book on the evolution of the idea of God: "it would be much more interesting if God wrote a book on the evolution of the idea of Grant Allen".

Allen also became a pioneer in science fiction. His novel The British Barbarians (1895), published about the same time as H. G. Wells's The Time Machine (which appeared in January–May 1895, and which includes a mention of Allen), also describes time travel, although the plot is quite different. Allen's short story "The Thames Valley Catastrophe" (published December 1897 in The Strand Magazine) describes the destruction of London by a sudden and massive volcanic eruption.

== Ancestry ==
Ancestors of Grant Allen

4. Henry Francis Allen
2. Joseph Antisell Allen
10. Joseph Antisell
5. Eliza Josephine Antisell
11. Elizabeth Gilbert
1. Charles Grant Blairfindie Allen
12. David Alexander Grant
6. Charles William Grant, 5th Baron de Longueuil
13. Marie-Charles Le Moyne, 4th Baroness de Longueuil
3. Catharine Ann Grant
14. John Coffin
7. Caroline Coffin
15. Anne Matthews

== Personal life ==
Allen married twice, first to Caroline Ann Bootheway (1846–1871) and secondly, in 1873, to Ellen Jerrard (1851–1936) with whom he had one son, Jerrard Grant Allen (1878–1946), a theatrical agent/manager who in 1913 married the actress and singer Violet Englefield. They had a son, Reginald "Reggie" Grant Allen (1910–1985).

Grant Allen's nephew, Grant Richards, was a writer and publisher who founded the Grant Richards publishing house. Allen encouraged his nephew's interest in books and publishing and helped him obtain his first positions in the book trade. Richards was later to publish a number of books written by his uncle, including The Evolution of the Idea of God and those in the book series Grant Allen's Historical Guides.

Allen's nieces by marriage, novelist Netta Syrett and artists Mabel Syrett and Nellie Syrett, all contributed work to The Yellow Book.

In 1893, Allen left London for the hills around the Devil's Punch Bowl, enthusing on the advantages of the change of scene: "Up here on the free hills, the sharp air blows in upon us, limpid and clear from a thousand leagues of open ocean; down there in the stagnant town, it stagnates and ferments."

== Death and posthumous publication ==
Grant Allen died of liver cancer at his home on Hindhead, Haslemere, Surrey, England, on 25 October 1899. He died before finishing Hilda Wade. The novel's final two episodes were completed by his friend and neighbour Dr Arthur Conan Doyle; the final episode appeared under the appropriate title "The Episode of the Dead Man Who Spoke" in the Strand Magazine in 1900.

== Legacy ==
Many histories of detective fiction mention Allen as an innovator. The illustrious Colonel Clay is a precursor of other gentleman rogue characters; he notably bears a strong resemblance to Maurice Leblanc's Arsène Lupin, introduced some years later. Both Miss Cayley's Adventures and Hilda Wade feature early female detectives.

The Scene of the Crime Festival, an annual festival celebrating Canadian mystery fiction, takes place annually on Wolfe Island, Ontario, near Kingston, Allen's birthplace and honors Allen.

A metal arch commemorating Allen, was designed by Lucy Quinnell and installed at the entrance to Allen Court in Dorking, Surrey in 2013.

== Quotes ==
"What a misfortune it is that we should thus be compelled to let our boys' schooling interfere with their education!"

== Partial bibliography ==
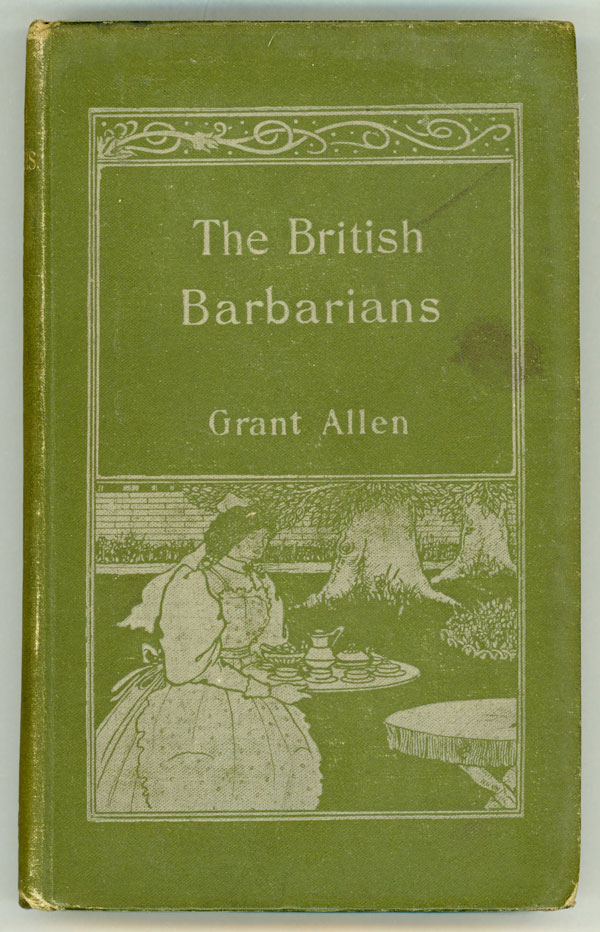
The British Barbarians, 1895

=== Books ===
- (1877) Physiological Esthetics
- (1879) The Colour-Sense: Its Origin and Development
- (1881) Evolutionist at Large
- (1881) Vignettes from Nature
- (1882) The Colours of Flowers
- (1883) Colin Clout's Calendar
- (1883) Flowers and Their Pedigrees
- (1884) Philistia. Allen's first novel
- (1884) Strange Stories. Short Stories
- (1885) Babylon. A novel in 3 volumes
- (1885) Charles Darwin. (English Worthies)
- (1886) For Mamie's Sake
- (1886) In All Shades
- (1887) The Beckoning Hand and Other Stories. Short Stories
- (1888) This Mortal Coil: A Novel
- (1888) Force and Energy
- (1888) The Devil's Die
- (1888) The White Man's Foot
- (1889) Falling in Love
- (1889) The Tents of Shem
- (1890) Wednesday the Tenth
- (1890) The Great Taboo
- (1891) Dumaresq's Daughter
- (1891) What's Bred in the Bone
- (1892) Pallinghurst Barrow. Short Story.
- (1892) The Duchess of Powysland
- (1893) The Scallywag
- (1893) Michael's Crag
- (1894) The Lower Slopes
- (1894) Post-Prandial Philosophy
- (1895) The British Barbarians
- (1895) At Market Value
- (1895) The Story of the Plants
- (1895) The Desire of the Eyes
- (1895) The Woman Who Did
- (1896) The Jaws of Death
- (1896) A Bride from the Desert
- (1896) Under Sealed Orders
- (1896) Moorland Idylls
- (1897) Kalee's Shrine
- (1897) An African Millionaire: Episodes in the Life of the Illustrious Colonel Clay
- (1897) The Evolution of the Idea of God
- (1897) Paris (Grant Allen's Historical Guides)
- (1897) Florence (Grant Allen's Historical Guides)
- (1897) Cities of Belgium (Grant Allen's Historical Guides)
- (1897) The Type-writer Girl (as Olive Pratt Rayner)
- (1897) Tom, Unlimited (as Martin Leach Warborough)
- (1898) Flashlights on Nature: A popular account of the life histories of some familiar insects, birds, plants, etc. with 150 illustrations by Frederick Enock. London: Grant Richards. 1898. OCLC 153673491 (all editions).
- (1898) The Incidental Bishop
- (1898) Venice. (Grant Allen's Historical Guides)
- (1899) The European Tour
- (1899) A Splendid Sin
- (1899) Miss Cayley's Adventures. Detective novel
- (1899) Twelve Tales: With a Headpiece, a Tailpiece, and an Intermezzo
- (1900) Hilda Wade. Detective novel finished by Arthur Conan Doyle
- (1900) Linnet
- (1901) The Backslider
- (1901) In Nature's Workshop
- (1908) Evolution in Italian Art
- (1909) The Hand of God
- (1909) The Plants
- (undated, c. 1890?) A Terrible Inheritance Microfilm copy

=== Selected articles ===
- (1878) "Hellas and Civilization," Gentleman's Magazine, Vol. CCXLIII, pp. 156–170
- (1878) "Nation-making: A Theory of National Characters," Gentleman's Magazine, Vol. CCXLIII, pp. 580–591
- (1880) "Why Keep India?," The Contemporary Review, Vol. XXXVIII, pp. 544–556
- (1880) "The Growth of Sculpture," The Cornhill Magazine, Vol. XLII, pp. 273–293
- (1880) "The English Chronicle," Gentleman's Magazine, Vol. CCXLVI, pp. 543–559
- (1880) "The Venerable Bede," Gentleman's Magazine, Vol. CCXLIX, pp. 84–100
- (1880) "The Dog's Universe," Gentleman's Magazine, Vol. CCXLIX, pp. 287–301
- (1880) "Evolution and Geological Time," Gentleman's Magazine, Vol. CCXLIX, pp. 563–579
- (1881) "The Story of Wulfgeat," Gentleman's Magazine, Vol. CCLI, pp. 551–561
- (1882) "An English Shire," Gentleman's Magazine, Vol. CCLII, pp. 49–70
- (1882) "The Welsh in the West Country," Gentleman's Magazine, Vol. CCLIII, pp. 179–197
- (1882) "The Colours of Flowers," The Cornhill Magazine, Vol. XLV, pp. 19–34
- (1882) "An English Weed," The Cornhill Magazine, Vol. XLV, pp. 542–554
- (1883) "Honeysuckle," Gentleman's Magazine, Vol. CCLV, pp. 313–322
- (1884) "The Garden Snail," Gentleman's Magazine, Vol. CCLVI, pp. 25–34
- (1884) "Our Debt to Insects," Gentleman's Magazine, Vol. CCLVI, pp. 452–469
- (1886) "A Thinking Machine," Gentleman's Magazine, Vol. CCLX, pp. 30–41
- (1889) "From Africa," Gentleman's Magazine, Vol. CCLXVII, pp. 547–557
- (1890) "The Girl of the Future," Universal Review, Vol. VII, p. 57
- (1891) "Democracy and Diamonds," The Contemporary Review, Vol. LIX, pp. 669–677

=== Selected short stories ===
- (1881) "The Child of the Phalanstery" in Belgravia
