= Brunilda à La Plata =

2025 comic book by Genís Rigol

- Series: Virages graphiques
- Page count: 143 pages
- Publisher: Payot et Rivages

Creative team
- Writer: Genís Rigol
- Artist: Genís Rigol

Original publication
- Date of publication: 2 April 2025
- Language: French
- ISBN: 978-2-7436-6617-0

Brunilda à La Plata is a 2025 comic book by the Spanish writer and artist Genís Rigol. It is an absurd story about a man who struggles to cross a theatre stage so he can have dinner with an attractive woman.

== Plot ==
Norman needs to cross a theatre stage to have dinner with the beautiful Brunilda at the restaurant La Plata. He is hindered by the playwright's difficulties with finishing the drama. The book consists of many large panels where Norman appears multiple times.

== Publication ==
Brunilda à La Plata was first published in French on 2 April 2025 in the Virages graphiques series from Payot et Rivages. It was published in Spanish as Brunilda en La Plata by Apa apa cómics on 3 November 2025.

== Reception ==
Christian Grange of ActuaBD described the book as absurd, thought-provoking, complex in its handling of feelings and "just incredible" in its graphic treatment. Benjamin Roure of BoDoï called it an "original and elusive" debut album and stressed its playful use of techniques from theatre, silent cinema and the world of animation where Rigol has his background.
