= Princess Hilda of Anhalt-Dessau =

Anhaltian princess (1839–1926)

Princess Hilda
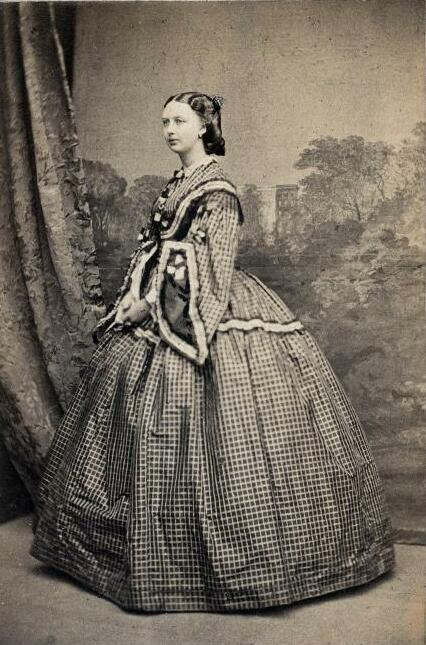
- Hilda around 1865
- Born: 13 December 1839; Dessau, Anhalt-Dessau, German Confederation
- Died: 22 December 1926 (aged 87); Dessau, Germany
- House: Ascania
- Father: Prince Frederick Augustus of Anhalt-Dessau
- Mother: Princess Marie Luise of Hesse-Kassel

Princess Hilda Charlotte of Anhalt-Dessau (13 December 1839 – 22 December 1926) was a member of the House of Ascania by birth. She was a leader in the Dessau of the Deutscher Krieger-Hilfsbund (German War Auxiliary Corps).

== Biography ==
She was the third child of the marriage of Prince Frederick Augustus of Anhalt-Dessau and Princess Marie Luise Charlotte of Hesse-Kassel. Her father was the son of Frederick, Hereditary Prince of Anhalt-Dessau and Princess Amalie of Hesse-Homburg, and her mother was the daughter of Prince William of Hesse-Kassel and his wife, Princess Charlotte of Denmark.

She is one of the sisters who contracted marriages with German princes:

1. Adelheid-Marie (1833–1916), married in 1851 to Adolphe, last Duke of Nassau and later, first Grand Duke of Luxembourg. From her descends the current Grand Ducal House of Luxembourg.
2. Bathildis Amalgunde (1837–1902), married on May 30, 1862, to prince Prince William of Schaumburg-Lippe, son of George William, Prince of Schaumburg-Lippee. Her eldest daughter, Charlotte of Schaumburg-Lippe, married William II of Württemberg, the last king of Wurtemberg.

Along with her mother and some of her sisters, she went on several trips around Europe. For example, in 1884, Hilda, her mother and Bathildis, went to Florence where they met with the family of her cousin the Duchess of Teck, including her daughter Princess Victoria Mary of Teck, who would be later be queen consort of the United Kingdom. In 1890, together with her sister Bathildis, they visited the bathing station in Bad Kissingen.

In 1905 her lady-in-waiting (hofdame) was the baroness von Heynitz.

During the First World War she participated as leader in Dessau of the Deutscher Krieger-Hilfsbund (German War Auxiliary Corps). This organization was dedicated to providing aid to German soldiers returning from the front in a precarious situation.

Hilda never married and died in Dessau in 1926 aged 87.

== Ancestry ==
Ancestors of Princess Hilda of Anhalt-Dessau

16. Leopold II, Prince of Anhalt-Dessau
8. Leopold III, Duke of Anhalt-Dessau
17. Gisela Agnes of Anhalt-Köthen
4. Frederick, Hereditary Prince of Anhalt-Dessau
18. Frederick Henry, Margrave of Brandenburg-Schwedt
9. Margravine Louise of Brandenburg-Schwedt
19. Leopoldine Marie of Anhalt-Dessau
2. Prince Frederick Augustus of Anhalt-Dessau
20. Frederick IV, Landgrave of Hesse-Homburg
10. Frederick V, Landgrave of Hesse-Homburg
21. Ulrike Louise of Solms-Braunfels
5. Landgravine Amalie of Hesse-Homburg
22. Louis IX, Landgrave of Hesse-Darmstadt
11. Landgravine Caroline of Hesse-Darmstadt
23. Countess Palatine Caroline of Zweibrücken
1. Princess Hilda of Anhalt-Dessau
24. Frederick II, Landgrave of Hesse-Kassel
12. Prince Frederick of Hesse-Kassel
25. Princess Mary of Great Britain
6. Prince William of Hesse-Kassel
26. Charles William, Prince of Nassau-Usingen
13. Princess Caroline of Nassau-Usingen
27. Countess Caroline Felizitas of Leiningen-Dagsburg
3. Princess Marie Luise Charlotte of Hesse-Kassel
28. Frederick V of Denmark
14. Frederick, Hereditary Prince of Denmark
29. Juliana Maria of Brunswick-Wolfenbüttel
7. Princess Charlotte of Denmark
30. Duke Louis of Mecklenburg-Schwerin
15. Duchess Sophia Frederica of Mecklenburg-Schwerin
31. Princess Charlotte Sophie of Saxe-Coburg-Saalfeld
