= Hildy =

Hildy is a given name, usually feminine. It may refer to:

== People ==
- Hildy Kuryk (born 1977), Director of Communications for Vogue magazine and former National Finance Director of the Democratic National Committee
- Hildy Parks (1926–2004), American actress

== Fictional characters ==
- Hildy Gloom, the antagonist of The 7D, an animated television series, voiced by Kelly Osbourne
- Hildy Granger, protagonist of She's the Sheriff, a television series, played by Suzanne Somers
- Hildy Johnson, a protagonist of the 1928 Broadway play The Front Page and various adaptations, sometimes as a man, sometimes as a woman
- Hildy, a main character in the 1944 Broadway musical On the Town and the 1949 film adaptation
