= Hilda Wade =

1899 novel by Grant Allen

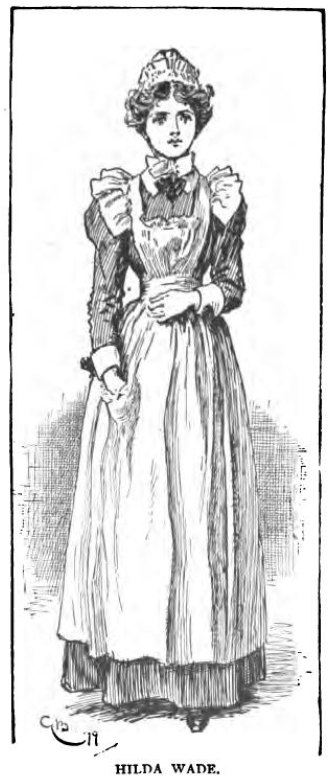
- Gordon Browne illustration of Hilda Wade
- Author: Grant Allen
- Illustrator: Gordon Browne
- Language: English
- Genre: Detective fiction
- Publisher: The Strand Magazine
- Publication date: March 1899 - February 1900
- Publication place: United Kingdom
- Text: Hilda Wade at Wikisource

Hilda Wade is a novel by Grant Allen, originally published as a serial in The Strand. It is notable as an example of early detective fiction with a female protagonist.

== Synopsis ==
Nurse Hilda Wade and the Watson-esque Dr. Hubert Cumberledge (narrating) attempt to track down the murderous Sebastian. Wade is the daughter of the murder victim, and agrees to marry the persistent Dr. Cumberledge only once Sebastian is brought to justice. After Wade saves Sebastian in Tibet, Sebastian confesses his crimes before dying on the return to England.

== Publication ==
Hilda Wade was published in The Strand from March 1899 to February 1900 in 12 chapters. The final two chapters were finished posthumously by Allen's friend and neighbor Arthur Conan Doyle.

It is a desperately difficult thing to carry on another man’s story, and must be a more or less mechanical effort. I had one experience of it when my neighbour at Hindhead, Grant Allen, was on his death-bed. He was much worried because there were two numbers of his serial, “Hilda Wade,” which was running in “The Strand” magazine, still uncompleted. It was a pleasure for me to do them for him, and so relieve his mind, but it was difficult collar work, and I expect they were pretty bad.

— Arthur Conan Doyle

== Themes & Reception ==
Hilda Wade addresses a variety of themes relevant to late 19th-century medicine, including the applied or abstract nature of biological research, the role of nurses compared to doctors, and particular kinds of knowledge as 'masculine' or 'feminine'. In contrast with detective fiction like the Sherlock Holmes series that focuses on clues, Hilda Wade focuses on Wade's deduction from the study of human personalities.

Writing in 1995, David Skene-Melvin describes the book as lackluster compared to other romantic intrigues published in the same era.
