= Duane Bryers =

American painter

Hilda

Duane B. "Dick" Bryers (July 2, 1911 – May 30, 2012) was an American painter, illustrator, and sculptor. In the 21st century, Bryers was rediscovered as the creator of the unconventionally plump pinup girl Hilda, who appeared in calendars from the mid-1950s to 1980s.

== Life ==
Duane Bryers was born to Samuel Edward Bryers (1877-1965) and his wife Winifred "Winnie" Dawn Bryers, née Myers (1883-1956). He had three brothers and two sisters. He initially spent his childhood on his parents' farm in Upper Peninsula of Michigan. When he was twelve, the family moved to Virginia, Minnesota, where he lived until 1939. He then had studios in Chicago and New York City.

After World War II he married Phyllis D. McFarland, with whom he had a son and two daughters. From 1959 he lived on a ranch near Tucson, Arizona. In 1964 the couple divorced. He met his second wife Denise "Dee" Ray (November 3, 1924 – January 29, 2002) and lived with her in a Mexican village 90 miles from Mexico City in the early 1970s. In 1975 they left Mexico. They purchased a piece of land in Sonoita and built a house on it in 1980 that Bryers referred to as "The Mud Hut".

Dee died in 2002 and Duane Bryers returned to Tucson. He died there at age 100.

== Work ==
In 1937, Bryers won a cash prize with a mural depicting mining history in Minnesota, later using the money to move to New York.

In 1942 he entered the Museum of Modern Art's National War Poster Competition with his poster design This is the Enemy in category C "The Nature of the Enemy." The poster was featured in an article in Life magazine. During his time at the flight mechanics school of the US Army Air Force from 1943 to 1946, he earned some money with so-called "girlie art" on aircraft fuselages (nose art). For the military base newspaper, he drew posters and comic strips featuring his original character Cokey.

After his military service, Bryers mainly illustrated calendars on the theme of American frontier, which were published by Brown & Bigelow in Saint Paul, Minnesota. In 1974 he also illustrated the book The Bunkhouse Boys from the Lazy Daisy Ranch, the text of which was written by his second wife Dee. However, he became famous for his creation Hilda, a fun-loving, chubby pin-up girl, of whom he made about 250 drawings beginning in 1956. Hilda also appeared on Brown & Bigelow calendars. Besides pin-up icon Bettie Page, Hilda was the most frequently pictured pin-up girl in the 1950s.

Bryers belonged to the seven-member artist group Tucson 7. In 1987 he was honored as artist of the year at the Tucson Art Festival. He also exhibited at the Prix de West at the National Cowboy Hall of Fame in Oklahoma City, where some of his paintings are in the collection. There he was awarded the Trustees Gold Medal for Outstanding Contribution to Western Art in 1980 on the occasion of a solo exhibition. He also took part in annual exhibitions in Houston, the so-called Western Heritage Show. The Duane Bryers Studio (DBS) has been in the Tucson Museum of Art since November 2013.

== See also ==
- Body positivity
