= Hildur Humla =

Swedish politician (1889–1969)

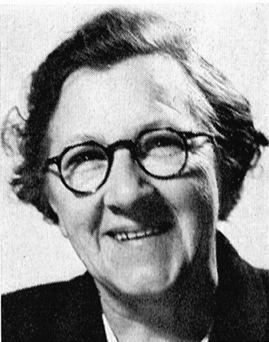
Hildur Humla

Hildur Humla (1889–1969) was a Swedish politician (Social Democratic Party of Sweden).

She was MP of the Second Chamber of the Parliament of Sweden in 1938–1952. She founded a vacation home for exhausted housewives in 1943, and worked as its manager until 1957.
