= Lime Kiln Mountain =

Mountain in Missouri, United States

Lime Kiln Mountain is a long ridge in Taney County in the Ozarks of southern Missouri. The ridge reaches an elevation of 1,330 feet (410 m) at 36°36′13″N 92°53′22″W. U.S. Route 160 traverses the ridgeline from Rueter in the southeast to Hilda in the northwest for a distance of approximately 7.5 mi (12.1 km). Cane Creek, a tributary of Beaver Creek, runs roughly parallel to the ridge along the northeast.

Lime Kiln Mountain was named for a lime kiln which was active in the 19th century.
