= Brunhilde (given name) =

Female given name

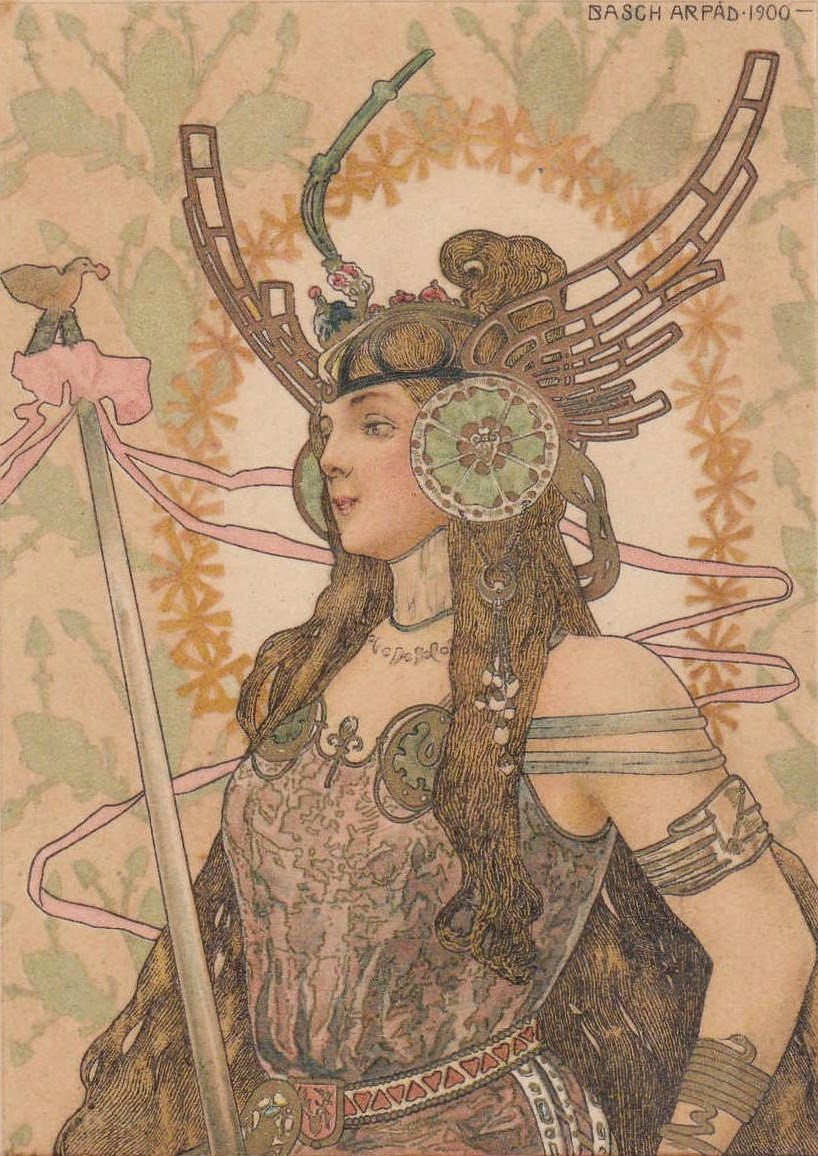
- Brunhilde by Árpád Basch, 1900.
- Gender: Female

Origin
- Origin: Germanic
- Meaning: "battle armor"

Other names
- Related names: Brunhild, Brünhild, Brunehilde, Brunhilda, Brunhilde, Brunilda, Brünnhilde, Brynhild, Brynhilda, Brynhildr, and Brynhildur

Brunhilde is a German feminine given name, derived from a combination of the Germanic word elements brun, or armor, and hild, or battle. The Valkyrie Brunhild is a heroine of Germanic heroic legend.

Variants in regular use include the Albanian, Italian, Portuguese, and Spanish Brunilda and Brunilde; the Norwegian Brynhild; and the Icelandic Brynhildur.

Brunhilde was in regular use for girls in Germany from the late 19th century through the 1960s, a time period when romantic German nationalism was in vogue and the names of idealized heroines such as Brunhild from Germanic heroic legend became more popular. Brünhild was also a character in Richard Wagner's four-part opera cycle Der Ring des Nibelungen, which became popular world-wide in the late 1800s.

== Brunhilde ==
- Brunhilde Baßler, German former pair skater
- Brunhilde Hanke (1930–2024), German politician
- Brunhilde Hendrix (1938–1995), West German track and field athlete and Olympian
- Brunhilde Irber (born 1948), German politician
- Brunhilde Nauer (born 1959), German politician
- Brunhilde Pomsel (1911–2017), German personal secretary to Nazi propaganda minister Joseph Goebbels
- Brunhilde Sonntag (1936–2002), German composer, musicologist and music teacher

== Brunhilda ==
- Brunhilda of Austrasia (c. 543–613), queen consort of Austrasia

== Brunilda ==
- Brunilda Ruiz (1936–2019), Puerto Rican ballet dancer, teacher, and choreographer

== Brunilde ==
- Brunilde Bianchi (born 1964), Italian ice dancing coach, choreographer, and former competitor
- Brunilde Ridgway (1929–2024), Italian-born American archaeologist and specialist in ancient Greek sculpture

== See also ==
- Brunild Pepa (born 1990), Albanian footballer
