= Hildreth (name) =

Hildreth is both a surname and a given name. Notable people with the name include:

Surname:

- Ellen Hildreth, co-inventor of the Marr–Hildreth algorithm in machine vision.
- Horace A. Hildreth, governor of Maine, 1945–1949
- James Hildreth, cricketer
- Lee Hildreth, footballer
- Lou Wills Hildreth (1928–2019), American Southern gospel performer, songwriter, talent agent and television host
- Mark Hildreth, wrestler, known as Van Hammer
- Mark Hildreth (actor)
- Richard Hildreth, journalist, historian
- Sam Hildreth, racehorse trainer
- Samuel Hildreth (American Revolution) (1750–1823), a surgeon in the Massachusetts militia and aboard Massachusetts naval privateers during the American Revolutionary War
- Samuel Prescott Hildreth (1783–1863), a pioneer physician, scientist, and historian in Ohio and the Northwest Territory
- Wes Hildreth, or E. W. Hildreth, a notable USGS geologist

Given name:

- Hildreth Frost, Colorado National Guardsman and lawyer
- Hildreth Glyn-Jones (1895–1980), British barrister
- Hildreth Meière, artist
