= Hilde Marstrander =

Norwegian artist, illustrator and art critic

Hilde Marstrander (born 8 December 1969) is a Norwegian artist, illustrator and art critic.

Hilde Marstrander has an academic and professional background as a fashion designer in London and Paris. Her journalism career includes positions as a host for fashion TV-shows on ZTV and TV3 and fashion editor for ELLE. She has also worked as a reporter for VG, Aftenposten, Avisenes Pressebyrå and the Norwegian Broadcasting Corporation(NRK). She had the position as the Editor-in-Chief of the Norwegian publication SNITT – Magazine for visual communication during the years 2006–2010.

However, Marstrander switched paths, and started studying contemporary art in 2010; first at Einar Granum Kunstfagskole, Then at the Academy of Art at the Arctic University of Norway and Parsons New School for Design in New York. She has later had art shows in Norway, Germany, England, Thailand and the US. She is currently an art critic for the Norwegian Association for Arts and Crafts and the monthly paper Ny Tid.

Marstrander has been involved in the 'Mote mot Pels' transl. 'Fashion against Fur' movement in Norwegian fashion. Their work led to Oslo Fashion Week adopting a fur-free policy.
