= St Hilda's College, Melbourne =

St Hilda's College
- University of Melbourne
- The crest of St Hilda's
- Location: 19-25 College Crescent, Parkville, Victoria, 3052
- Coordinates: 37°47′33″S 144°57′45″E
- Motto: Communitas
- Motto in English: Community
- Founder: E.H. Sugden
- Established: 1964
- Undergraduates: 240
- Website: St Hilda's College Website

St Hilda's College is a college of The University of Melbourne, providing a residential community for students from all parts of regional Victoria, interstate and overseas. It provides accommodation, academic and pastoral support for 240 undergraduate students. In addition to the students, St Hilda's College (more simply known as Hilda's) also houses a number of senior residential advisors and other staff. The college mascot is Diego the Dinosaur.

== History ==
St Hilda's College was established as a result of the inspiration of Dr E.H. Sugden, the first Master of Queen's College, who in 1888, at the Official Opening of Queen's, stated: "I hope we soon have a hostel for women in these grounds".

Between 1888 and 1957 there were a number of attempts to establish a residential college to provide for the needs of the increasing numbers of young Methodist and Presbyterian women who were coming to Melbourne to undertake tertiary study. However it was not until 1957 when a provisional council was established and then 1959 when a group of church and university women began a fundraising campaign that the idea started to become a reality. Early in this successful attempt, Queen's College donated the land on which St Hilda's now stands, an area to the west of the Queen's buildings then known affectionately as the "cow paddock". This donation facilitated the development of the much discussed college as land was available.

Marjorie Smart was invited to take up the position of Principal, and with her background in academia and the diplomatic service showed herself to be ideally suited to be the foundation principal of a fledgling college. Building commenced in September 1962, and by March 1964 the first students arrived to take up residence with over 250 students applying for the initial 87 places available. Smart retired in 1975 when she was made an AM.

In 2014, the college celebrated its 50th anniversary with a series of decade reunions and celebratory events, including a production of Barry Manilow's 'Copacabana'.

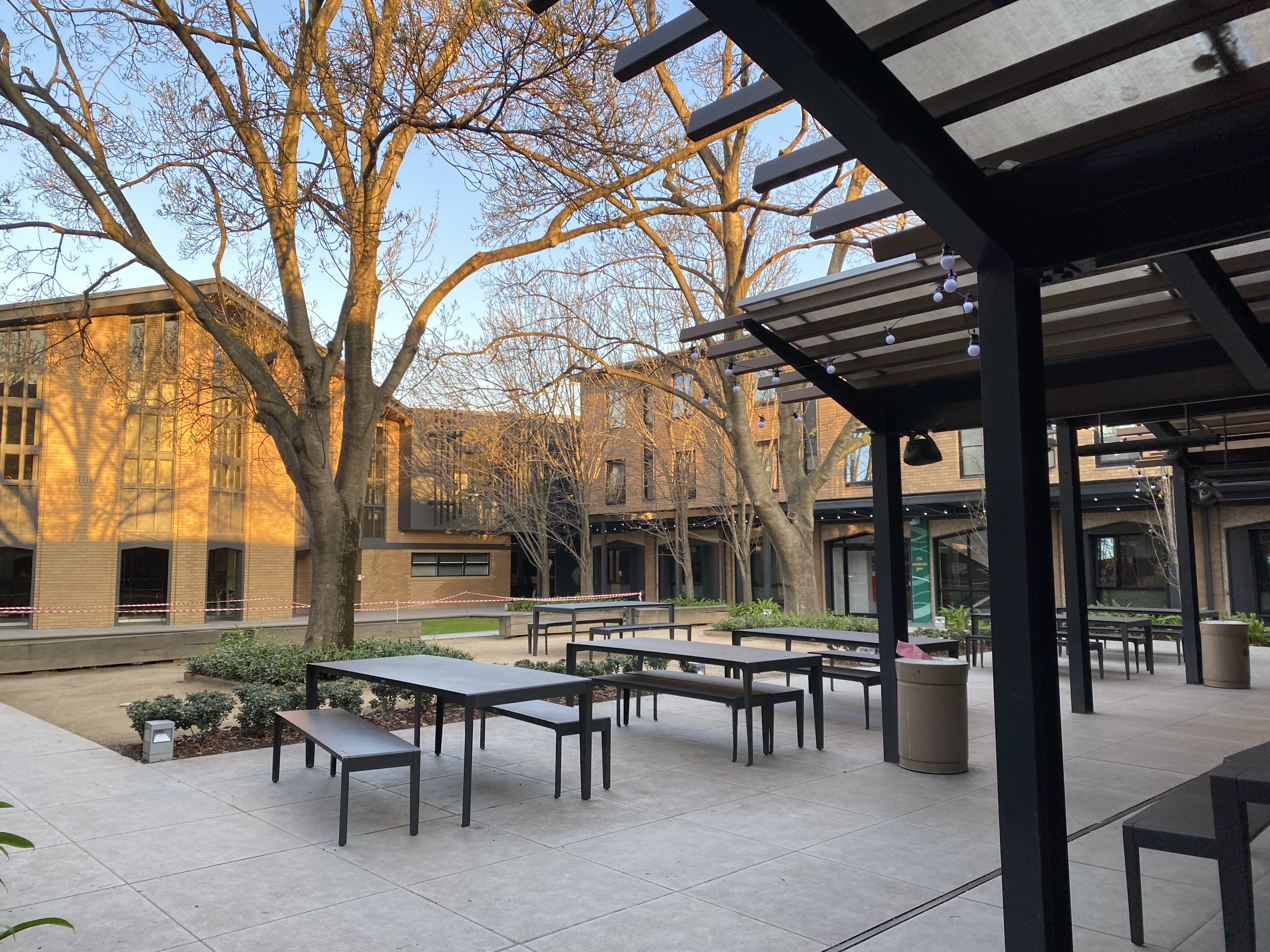
St Hilda's College

Initially established as a college for women, when all colleges were single-sex residences, St Hilda's was the first at The University of Melbourne to become co-educational, in 1973 under Marjorie Smart.

== Buildings ==
A statute granting affiliation with The University of Melbourne was passed in 1960 and a public appeal was launched under the patronage of Dame Pattie Menzies and the chairmanship of Sir Charles Lowe. The money raised in this appeal, together with grants from the Commonwealth and State Governments, made it possible to complete the first phase of the college building by the beginning of 1964.

In 2007, the Brian James Wing of the college was completed providing modern en suite accommodation units for third year Undergraduate Students and Graduate Students, as well as Tutor accommodation and a Visiting Scholars' Apartment.

== Sport ==
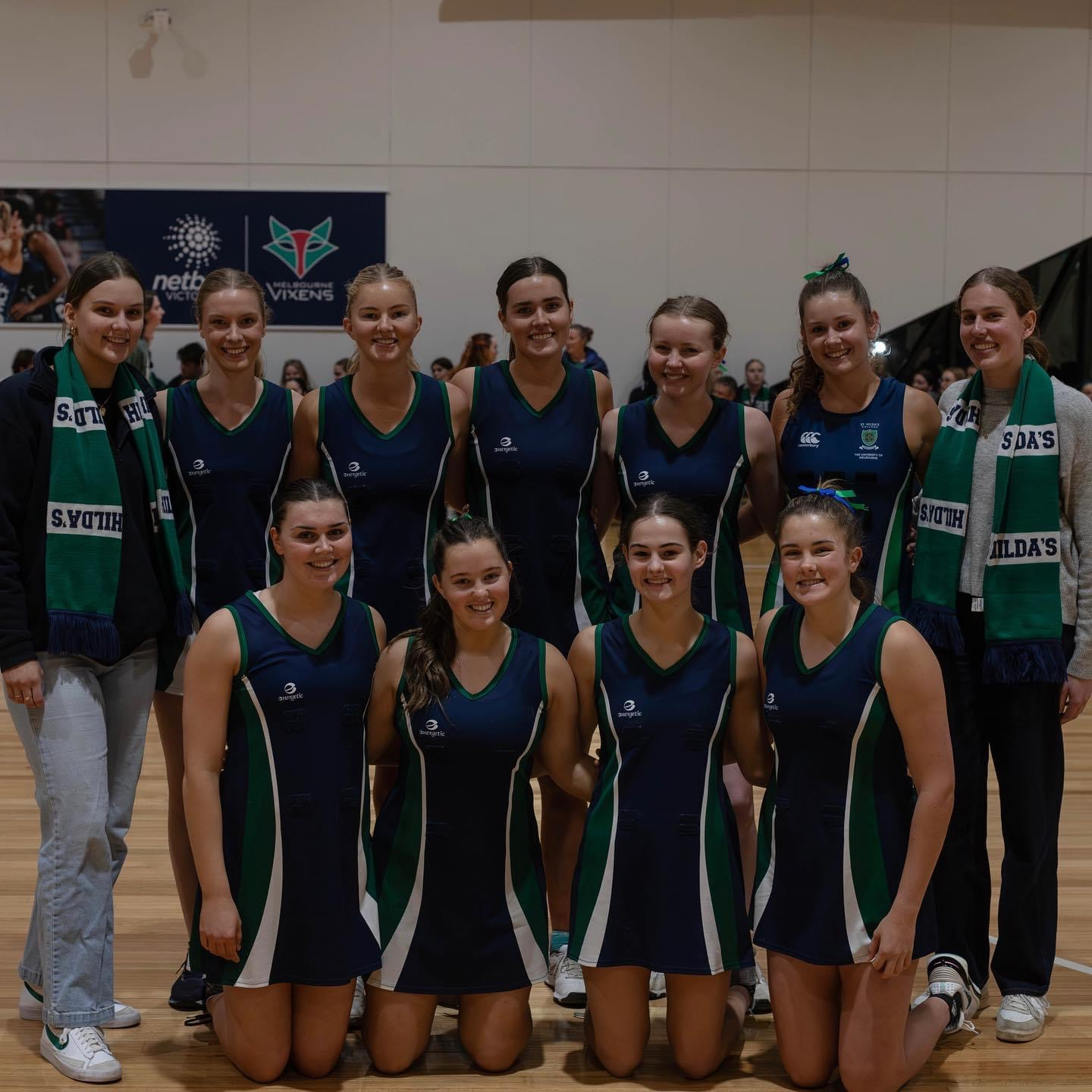
St Hilda's College Netball Team 2023

St Hilda's College participates in the Intercollegiate Sporting Council (ICSC) competition. Sports available to all residents include: men's and women's Australian rules football, soccer, softball, athletics, cricket, swimming, rowing, hockey, basketball, tennis, volleyball, badminton, squash, pool, table tennis and women's netball.

== Cultural ==
The Intercollegiate Activities Committee (ICAC) run a number of events with which St Hilda's participate. These provide the opportunity for each of the colleges associated with The University of Melbourne to engage with members of other colleges from the university. Events include: Intercollegiate 'Fresher Dance Off' in which first year students present a dance learnt in their 'O Week' to the other colleges with one college crowned the winner. Battle of the Bands involves each participating college forming a band and presenting a short set to the audience, with again one college being crowned the winner. Other ICAC events open to all colleges include trivia nights, public speaking events, theatre games and more.

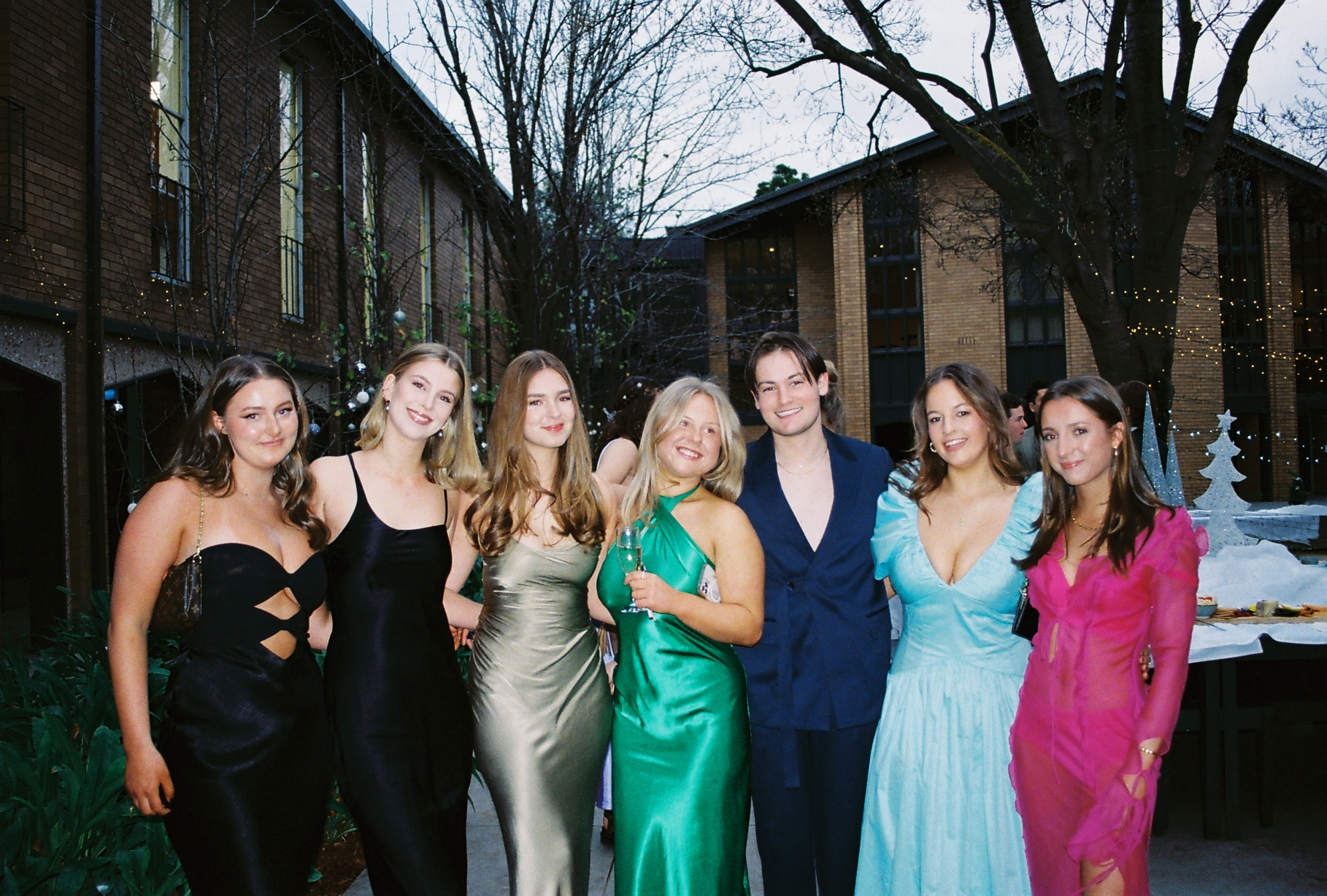
St Hilda's Annual Ball Celebration

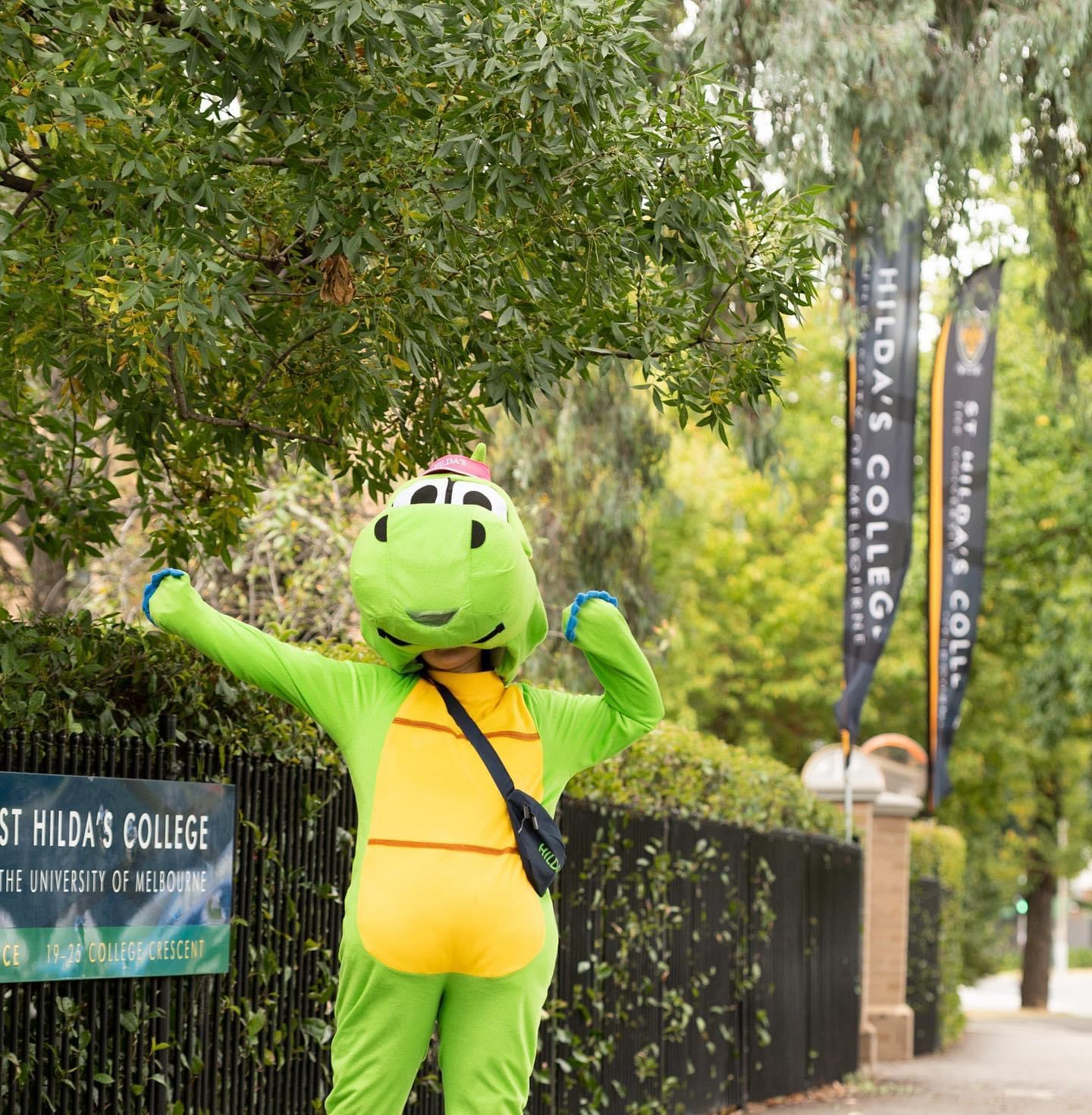
'Diego the Dinosaur' - St Hilda's College Mascot

== Leadership ==
James Hardiman has presided as principal of the college since 2023, as the 7th principal of the college. Fiona Cadorel is the current dean of students. Adrian Oates holds the associate dean title.

Student club leadership includes roles such as the president, vice-president, treasurer and secretary. These roles function as an executive that work above the General committee (GC); such leadership should be voted in by students in a democratic like manner.
