= St. Hilda's College (University of Toronto) =

Student residence of Trinity College, Toronto

- Residence hall of Trinity College
- University of Toronto
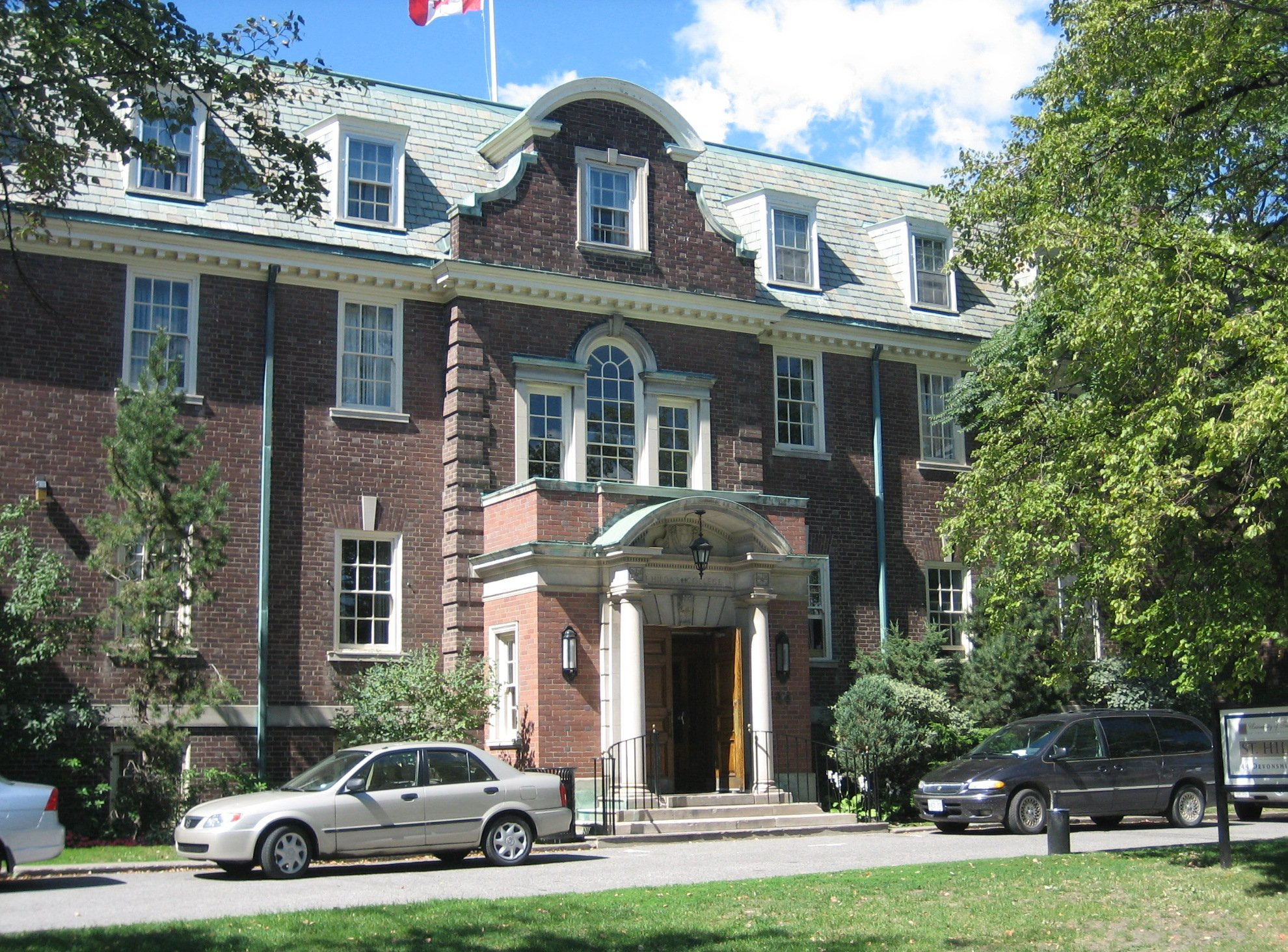

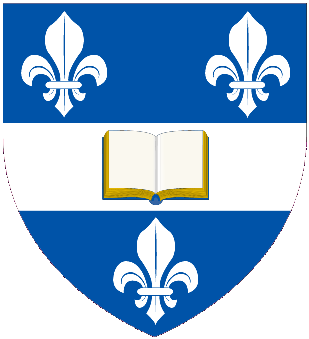
- Arms: Azure on a fess between three fleur de lys Argent an open book also Argent edged Or bound Azure.
- Location: 44 Devonshire Place; Toronto, Ontario, Canada
- Coordinates: 43°39′56.5″N 79°23′52″W
- Motto: Timor dei principium sapientiae (Latin)
- Motto in English: "The Fear of God is the Beginning of Wisdom"
- Established: February 11, 1890 (136 years ago)
- Named for: St. Hilda of Whitby
- Website: www.trinity.utoronto.ca/residence/st-hildas-college/

St. Hilda's College is a residence hall of Trinity College, a federated university in the University of Toronto located on its St. George campus in Toronto, Ontario. Although all students registered at Trinity College are considered students of St. Hilda's College, it is not an independent body and today serves only an administrative function. St. Hilda's College was named after St. Hilda of Whitby.

== History ==
Trinity College admitted its first female student in 1884, before it joined the University of Toronto's federation. In 1888, it was decided that a distinct college was required for Trinity's women students. St. Hilda's College was initially opened in a building on Euclid Avenue in Toronto, with two resident students. A coat of arms was granted on August 18, 1998. The college was moved to a building on Shaw Street in 1889, then to a set of two larger houses on the same street in 1892, and in 1903 to a larger, purpose-built building on the main Trinity College grounds in Trinity Bellwoods Park.

In 1925, when Trinity College moved from its original location on Queen Street to the St. George campus, St. Hilda's College was initially moved to 99 St. George Street. The final move took place in 1938, when the current St. Hilda's building on Devonshire Place was opened. The former St. Hilda's College building at Trinity Bellwoods Park (designed by Eden Smith and opened in 1899) is now called John Gibson House and functions as a residence for seniors.

In 2005, the administration of Trinity College elected to end the practice of same-sex residency. As a result, St. Hilda's College now houses both men and women.
