= Hildur Schirmer =

German-Norwegian soprano (1856–1914)

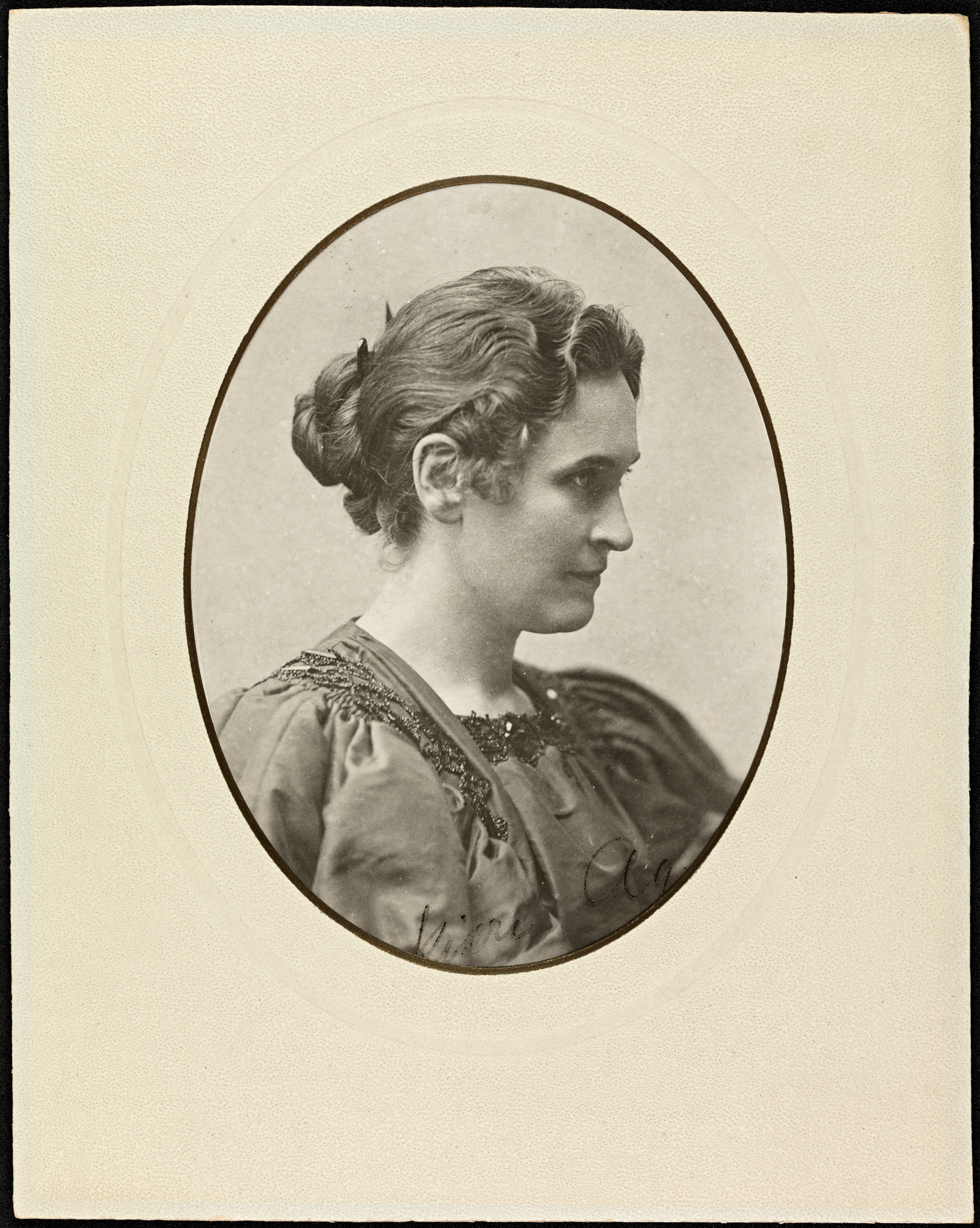
Hildur Schirmer

Hildur Schirmer, née Koch, (13 March 1856 – 23 April 1914) was a German-Norwegian soprano, singing teacher and women's rights activist.

== Life ==
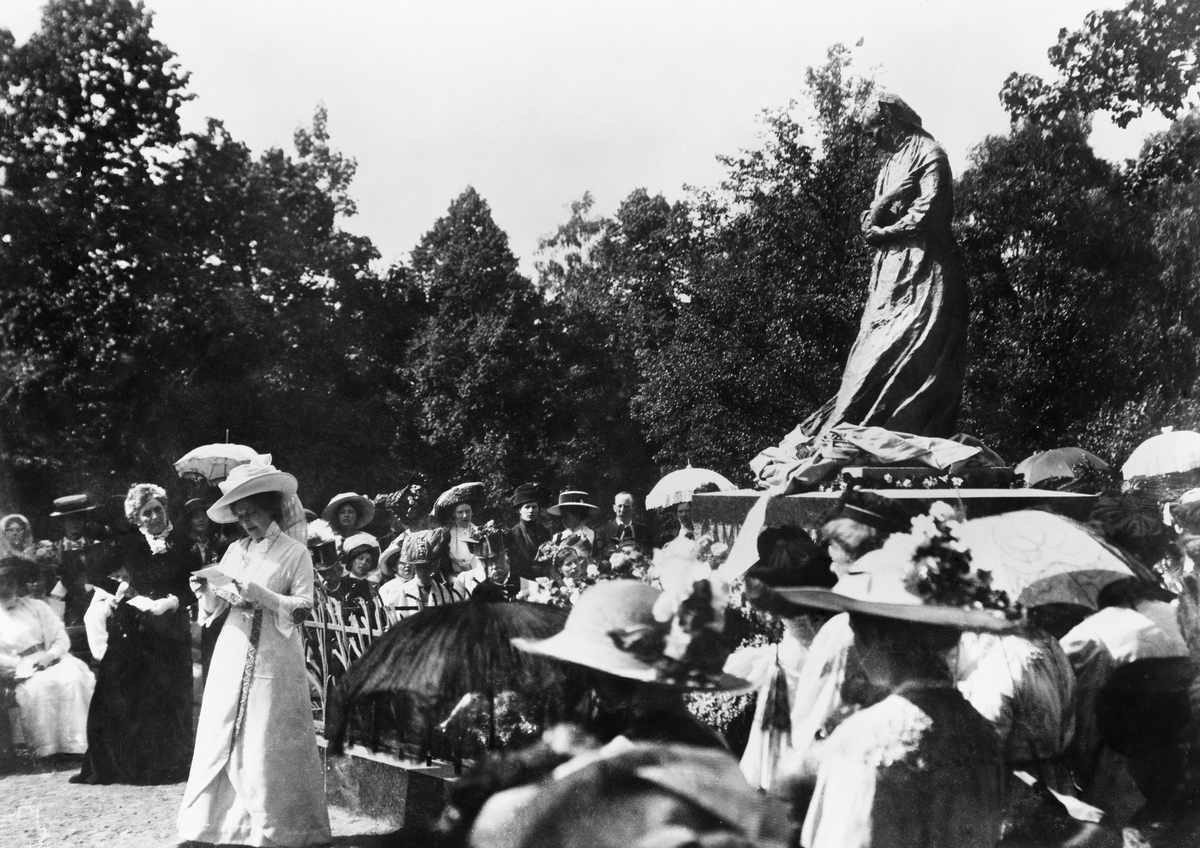
Schirmer speaking at the unveiling of the Camilla Collett in Oslo Palace Park in 1911.

Born in Braunschweig, Duchy of Brunswick, Schirmer received her first musical training in Germany and then studied with Pauline Viardot in Paris. In Kristiania, she was active as a concert singer in the 1880s and 90s. She was also a teacher at the music conservatory in Kristiania, and in 1906 she also became president of the music teachers' association in Kristiania. After 1900, her activities as a singing teacher seem to have become an increasingly important part of her field of work.

In 1884, she was a co-founder of the women's rights organisation Norwegian Association for Women's Rights (NKF) and was a member of the national board for several years. In 1896, she took the initiative to erect a monument in memory of Camilla Collett. The monument, created by Gustav Vigeland, was unveiled in 1911 in Oslo Palace Park.

Shirmer died in Kristiania at the age of 58.

== Family ==
In 1878 she married the Norwegian architect Adolf Schirmer in Braunschweig and was thus the daughter-in-law of the architect Heinrich Ernst Schirmer.
