= Hildegard =

- Gender: Female
- Language: Old High German

Origin
- Meaning: "Battle Enclosure"

Other names
- Alternative spelling: Hildegarde, Hildegarda, Ildegarda, Hildegárd, Hildegardis

Hildegard is a female name derived from the Old High German hild ('war' or 'battle') and gard ('enclosure' or 'yard'), and means 'battle enclosure'. Variant spellings include: Hildegarde; the Polish, Portuguese, Slovene and Spanish Hildegarda; the Italian Ildegarda; the Hungarian Hildegárd; and the ancient German Hildegardis.

== Notable people with the name ==
=== Nobility and church personages ===
These are medieval and early-modern women with the name, listed chronologically:

- Hildegard (757 or 758–783), second wife of Charlemagne
- Hildegard, Countess of Auvergne, also called "Matilda" (c. 802–841), daughter of Emperor Louis the Pious and Ermengarde of Hesbaye (and thus granddaughter of Charlemagne and Hildegard)
- Hildegard of Fraumünster (828–856 or 859), daughter of Louis the German and first abbess of Fraumünster
- Hildegarde of Burgundy (c. 1056–1104), French noble
- Hildegard of Bingen (1098–1179), Christian saint
- Princess Hildegard of Bavaria (1825–1864), Bavarian royal

=== Nineteenth century and later ===
- Hildegard Appeltauer (1927–2017), Austrian figure skater and Olympian
- Hildegard Bachert (1921–2019), German-born American art dealer and gallery director
- Hildegard Bechtler (born 1951), German costume and set designer
- Hildegard Behrens (1937–2009), German opera singer
- Hildegard Bentele (born 1967), German politician
- Hildegard Björck (1847–1920), Swedish academic pioneer
- Hildegard Breiner, Austrian anti-nuclear activist
- Hildegard Brom-Fischer (1908–2001), Dutch textile artist, specializing in ecclesiastical embroidery
- Hildegard Burjan (1883–1933), German Roman Catholic convert from Judaism and the founder of the Sisterhood of Caritas Socialis
- Hildegard Damerius (1910–2006), German lawyer and politician
- Hildegard Embacher (born 1967), Austrian cross-country skier and Olympian
- Hildegard Falck (born 1949), German middle distance runner and Olympic medalist
- Hildegard Fässler (born 1951), Swiss politician
- Hildegard Feldmann (1936–1990), Swiss nurse and Catholic lay missionary who was active in India and Colombia
- Hildegarde Flanner (1899–1987), American poet and activist
- Hildegard Goebbels (1934–1945), daughter and murder victim of Nazi Propaganda Minister, Joseph Goebbels and Magda Goebbels
- Hildegard Goss-Mayr (born 1930), Austrian nonviolent activist and Christian theologian
- Hildegard Grethe (1898–1961), German actress
- Hildegard Grill (1927–2023), Austrian gymnast and Olympian
- Hildegard Hamm-Brücher (1921–2016), German politician
- Hildegard Hammerschmidt-Hummel (1944–2024), German academic
- Hildegard Heichele (born 1947), German soprano in opera, concert and recital
- Hildegard Hess (1920–2014), German chemist
- Hildegarde Howard (1901–1998), American paleornithologist
- Hildegard Jadamowitz (1916–1942), German communist activist and a member of the German resistance against National Socialism
- Hildegard Jone (1891–1963), Austrian poet and artist
- Hildegard Joos (1909–2005), Austrian painter
- Hildegard Kleeb (born 1957), Swiss pianist
- Hilde Klusenwerth (1910–1999), German hurdler and Olympian
- Hildegarde Kneeland (1889–1994), American economist and statistician
- Hildegard Knef (1925–2002), German actress, singer and writer
- Hildegard Korf Kallmann-Bijl (1908–1968), German-born American physicist
- Hildegard Korger (1935–2018), Czech master calligrapher, scholar and professor
- Hildegard Körner (born 1959), East German middle distance runner and Olympian
- Hildegard Krekel (1952–2013), German actress
- Hildegard Lächert (1920–1995), German Nazi concentration camp guard
- Hildegard Lamfrom (1922–1984), German-American molecular biologist/biochemist
- Hildegard Lehnert (1857–1943), German painter
- Hildegard Lewy (1903–1969), Romanian Assyriologist and academic
- Hildegarde Dolson Lockridge (1908–1981), poet, playwright and novelist
- Hildegard Löwy (1922–1943), German Jewish office worker and member of the anti-Nazi resistance
- Hildegard Mende (1922–?), German Nazi concentration camp guard
- Hildegard Moniac (1891–1967), German educator and political activist
- Hildegarde Naughton (born 1977), Irish politician and mayor of Galway
- Hildegarde Neil (1939–2023), South African-born English actress
- Hildegard Neuffer-Stavenhagen (1866–1939), German writer with a focus on children's literature and education
- Hildegard Neumann (born 1919 – c. 2010), German Nazi and concentration camp overseer
- Hildegard Maria Nickel (born 1948), German sociologist and feminist
- Hildegard Ochse (1935–1997), German photographer
- Hildegard Peplau (1909–1999), American nurse
- Hildegard Puwak (1949–2018), Romanian politician
- Hildegard Ranczak (1895–1987), Bohemian operatic soprano
- Hildegard Maria Rauchfuß (1918–2000), German writer
- Hildegard Reinhardt (born 1942), German translator and art historian
- Hildegart Rodríguez Carballeira (1914–1933, Spanish activist for socialism and sexual revolution
- Hildegard Rosenthal (1913–1990), Swiss-born Brazilian photographer
- Hildegard Rothe-Ille (1899–1942), German mathematician
- Hildegard Rütgers (born 1930), German classical contralto singer in opera and concert
- Hildegard Schaeder (1902–1984), German theologian and church historian
- Hilde Schrader (1910–1966), German swimmer and Olympian
- Hildegarde Sell (1906–2005), American cabaret singer known as Hildegarde
- Hildegard Sellhuber (born 1950), retired German speed skater and Olympian
- Hilde Krahwinkel Sperling (1908–1981), German-Danish tennis player
- Hildegard Stücklen (1891–1963), German-American physicist who dealt with spectroscopy
- Hildegard Temporini-Gräfin Vitzthum (1939–2004), German classical historian and writer
- Hildegard Thorell (1850–1930), Swedish painter
- Hildegard Trabant (1927–1964), East German woman shot and killed while trying to cross over the Berlin Wall into West Germany
- Hildegard Vieregg (born 1939), German museologist and museum professional, an educator, a university professor and lecturer, author, editor and administrator
- Hilda (Hildegarde) Vīka (1897–1963), Latvian artist and writer
- Hildegard Werner (1834–1911), Swedish musician, musical conductor, and journalist active in Great Britain
- Hildegard Westerkamp (born 1946), German-born Canadian composer, radio artist, teacher, and sound ecologist
- Hildegard Woodward (1898–1977), American children's book author and illustrator
- Hildegard Wortmann (born 1966), German business executive

=== Other ===
- Hildegard (music duo), 2021 electronic music project by Canadian musicians Helena Deland and Ouri

== Fictional characters ==
With no last name (listed alphabetically by their source):

- Hildegarde (Hilda), from the manga and anime series Beelzebub
- Hildegarde, from the game Catan (web/app version)
- Princess Hildegard, from the Disney animated series Sofia the First
- Hildegard, "Devout Oracle," from the mobile game Dragalia Lost
- Hildegarde, a Marvel Comics Valkyrie
- Hildegarde, in the Johann Strauss operetta Simplicius

By last name:

- Hildy Gloom, witch and main antagonist of The 7D
- Hildy Johnson, from the 1940 American comedy film His Girl Friday
- Hildegard Hamhocker, a character in Tumbleweeds (comic strip)
- Hildegarde Antoinette "Hilda" Spellman, a character in the comic book Sabrina the Teenage Witch and subsequent television series
- Hildegarde T., from the anime and manga series Beelzebub by Ryūhei Tamura
- Hildegard von Krone, from the Soul series of fighting games
- Hildegard von Mariendorf, from Legend of the Galactic Heroes
- Hildegarde Withers, in novels and films
