= List of female calligraphers =

This is a partial list of notable female calligraphers.

== 3rd century ==
- Xie Daoyun Chinese poet, writer, scholar and calligrapher
- Wei Shuo (272–349) Chinese calligrapher

== 7th-10th centuries ==
- Al-Shifa' bint Abdullah Arabic calligrapher
- Al-Nuddar (d. 984) Andalusian calligrapher and scholar
- Umm al-Darda al-Sughra
- Sana (8th Century) Abbasid calligrapher
- Fadl (d. 260/873-74) Abbasid poet and calligrapher
- Gulsum al-Attabi (d. 220/835) Arabic calligrapher
- Fadl (10th Century)
- Duhtar-i ibn Mukla Shirazi (10th Century)
- Muzna (d. 358/969)
- Fadl (d. 260/873-74)
- Fatima (?-?) Andalusian calligrapher

== 11th-12th centuries ==
- Safiyyah bint Abd al-Rabb (d. 1026)
- Fatima bint Zakariya bint Abdullah al-Shebbarp (d. 1036)
- Diemoth (b. 1060-130) Bavarian calligrapher
- Fatima al-Baghdadi bint Hasan b. ‘Alī b. ‘Abdullah Attar (d. 480/1087) Iraqi calligrapher
- Fakhr-un-Nisa (d. 1112) Iranian calligrapher
- Lubna (d. 1003) Abbasid poet and calligrapher
- Zaynab Shahda bint Ahmad b. Al-Faraj b. ‘Omar Al-Abrī (d. 547/1178) Iraqi calligrapher
- Sittu'r-Rida bint Nasrallah b. Mas'ud (d. after 567/1171)

== 13th-14th centuries ==
- Shuhda Bint Al-‘Ibari (d. 1178) Abbasid calligrapher
- Guan Daosheng (1262–1319) Chinese poet, painter and calligrapher
- Cao Miaoqing Chinese poet and calligrapher
- Sitt Nasim Abbasid calligrapher

== 15th-16th centuries ==
- Clara Hätzlerin (c. 1430–1476) Bavarian scribe
- Jacomina Hondius (1558–1628) Flemish and Dutch calligrapher
- Esther Inglis (1571–1624) English miniaturist and calligrapher
- Margareta Karthäuserin (b. ?) Bavarian scribe
- Elizabeth Lucar (1510–1537) British calligrapher
- Marie Pavie (fl. 1600) French calligrapher
- Fatimah bint Quraymazan (d. 1558)
- Shin Saimdang (1504–1551) Korean artist, author and calligrapher
- Maria Strick (1577-1625) Dutch calligrapher and teacher

== 17th-18th centuries ==
- Amina (daughter of calligrapher, Mustafa Chelebi) minor calligrapher active in Ottoman Bosnia
- Goharshad Ghazvini Persian calligrapher
- Ike Gyokuran (1727–1784) Japanese painter and calligrapher
- Esmâ Ibret Hanim (b. 1780) Ottoman calligrapher
- Marjan al-Katib al-Islami Iranian calligrapher
- Fatıma Ânî Hanım (d.1122 / 1710) Ottoman calligrapher
- Fatıma Tûtî (d. 1106-1123 / 1694-95)
- Fang Weiyi (1585–1668) Chinese poet, calligrapher and historian
- Şerife Zehra Hanim Ottoman calligrapher
- Im Yunjidang (1721–1793) Korean philosopher and calligrapher
- Cao Zhenxiu (b. 1762) Chinese calligrapher

== 19th-20th centuries ==
- Wijdan Ali (b. 1939) Iraqi calligrapher
- Ameena Ahmad Ahuja Indian painter and calligrapher
- Leslie Charlotte Benenson (1941–2018) English artist and calligrapher
- Mickie Caspi (b. 1961) Israeli calligrapher and artist
- Wasma'a Khalid Chorbachi (b. 1944) American-Iraqi artist and calligrapher
- Chang Ch'ung-ho (1914–2015) Chinese poet and calligrapher
- Winnie Siu Davies (b. ?) Chinese painter and calligrapher
- Elizabeth Friedländer (1903–1984) German calligrapher
- Jen Taylor Friedman (b. ?) ritual scribe
- Wang Huiqin (b. 1945) Chinese-Slovenian calligrapher
- Hu Jieqing (1905–2001) Chinese painter and calligrapher
- Pouran Jinchi (b. 1959) Iranian-American artist and calligrapher
- Samira Kitman (b. 1984) Afghani-British calligrapher and artist
- Hildegard Korger (b. 1935) German calligrapher
- Monika Krajewska (b. ?) Polish calligrapher and mizrah artist
- Patricia Lovett (b.?) British scribe, calligrapher and illuminator
- Ada Louise Powell (b. 1865) British decorative artist and calligrapher
- Zahide Selma Hanim (1857–1895) Ottoman calligrapher
- Hilal Kazan - Turkish academic, historian and calligrapher
- Midori Kono Thiel (b. ?) Japanese-American calligrapher
- Huda Totonji (b.?) Arab-American calligrapher
- Carol Twombly (b. 1959) American calligrapher
- Şerife Fatma "Mevhibe" Hanım Ottoman calligrapher
- Ema Saikō (1787–1861) Japanese calligrapher
- Zulaykhah Khatimi al-Sa'di (?-?)
- Emine Servet Hanim (b. 1859) Ottoman calligrapher
- Soraya Syed (b. 1976) English-Pakistani calligrapher
- Gudrun Zapf von Hesse (1918–2019) German typographer, calligrapher and book-binder
- Sheila Waters (1929—2022) English calligrapher
- Irene Wellington (1904–1984) British calligrapher
- Mary White (ceramicist and calligrapher) (1926–2013) British calligrapher
- Hilda Wiseman (1894–1982) Australian calligrapher, artist and designer
- Rachel Yallop (b. ?) British calligrapher
- Yuan Xiaoyuan (1901–2003) Chinese diplomat, politician, author, linguist, calligrapher and artist
- Lou Zhenggang (b. 1966) Chinese artist and calligrapher
- Nuria Garcia Masip (b. 1978) Spanish Calligrapher

== See also ==
- Calligraphy
- Islamic calligraphy
