= Wortmann (surname) =

Wortmann (German for word and man) is a German surname. Notable people with the surname include:

- Amelie Wortmann (born 1996), German field hockey player
- Claire Waldoff born Clara Wortmann (1884–1957), German singer
- Corien Wortmann-Kool (born 1959), Dutch politician
- Dietrich Wortmann (1884–1952), German wrestler
- Franz Xaver Wortmann (1921–1985), German engineer
- Hans Wortmann (1950–2022), Dutch computer scientist
- Hildegard Wortmann (born 1966), German business executive
- Ivo Wortmann (born 1949), Brazilian footballer and engineer
- Siegfried Wortmann (1907–1951) Austrian footballer
- Sönke Wortmann (born 1954), German film director and producer

== See also ==
- Wortman
