= Zhenxiu =

Zhenxiu is a Chinese given name. Notable people with the name include:

- Cao Zhenxiu (Chinese: 曹贞秀; 1762–?), Chinese author, poet, calligrapher, and painter
- Li Zhenxiu (Chinese: 李貞秀; born 1973), Chinese-born Taiwanese politician

== See also ==
- Zhěnxiù (轸宿) or Chariot, a Chinese constellation
