= Şerife Fatma "Mevhibe" Hanım =

19th century female Ottoman calligrapher and poet

Şerife Fatma "Mevhibe" Hanım was a 19th century female Ottoman calligrapher and poet.

== Life and career ==
During the Ottoman period, calligraphy was largely a male-dominated profession. However, a small group of female artists, including Esmâ Ibret Hanim and Şerife Fatma "Mevhibe" Hanım, made valuable contributions to Turkish art and culture.

Very few details about Fatma "Mevhibe" Hanım are known with certainty. She was the daughter of Seyyid Mehmed Hasib Pasha (d. 1870), an Ottoman statesman, who had served as the Minister of the Treasury. The title, “Şerife” (meaning honourable), reflects her ancestry which her family claimed to descend from one of the Prophet's brothers. She assumed the nickname "Mevhibe", meaning “generous gift” after she became a practicing poet and calligrapher.

She received a good early education and later studied calligraphy with Hakkâkzâde Mustafa Hilmi Efendi (d. 1268/1852) and Vasfi Efendi (d.?.). After she had learned both the thuluth and naskhi scripts, she received her idjazat (diploma).

She died at a young age, but her precise date of death is unknown.

== Work ==
A major problem cataloguing the work of female calligraphers has been the absence of signed works. Female artists were encouraged to demonstrate humility and discouraged from signing their work. However, recent scholarship has positively identified many works by important female calligraphers and poets.

Known works by Fatma Hanim include:

- Hilye-i Şerifi, also known as Bint-i Hüdâverdi, registered in TSMK 888 inventory, Cairo
- Two sulus and neish inscriptions in the Topkapi Museum, dated to around 1850 (1266H)

== See also ==
List of female calligraphers
