= Damerius =

Damerius is a surname. Notable people with the surname include:

- Emmy Damerius-Koenen (1903–1987), East German politician, wife of Helmut
- Helmut Damerius (1905–1985), German communist, theatre director, writer, and politician
- Hildegard Damerius (1910–2006), German lawyer and politician
