= Marie Pavie =

French calligrapher

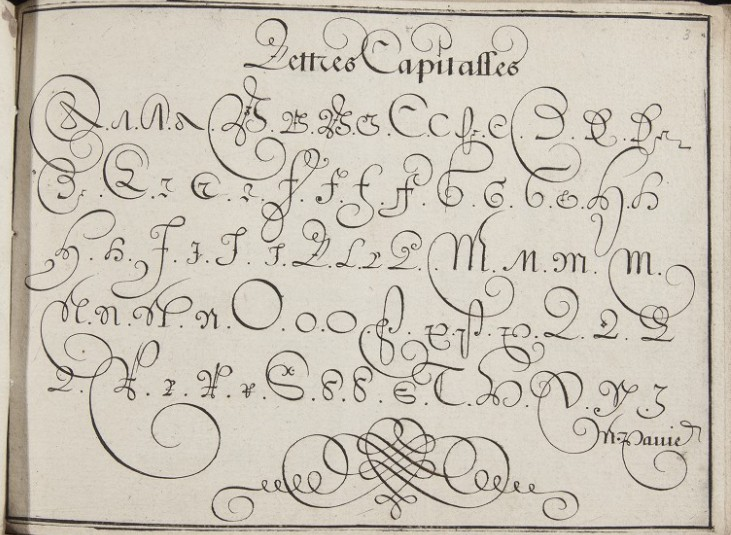
- A page from Le premier essay de la plume de Marie Pavie. S.l., 1608. (Chicago NL).
- Occupation: calligrapher
- Years active: c. 1608
- Notable work: Le premier essay de la plume de Marie Pavie(1608)

Marie Pavie (fl. 1600) was a calligrapher active in France at the beginning of the seventeenth century and one of the earliest women to have published a copybook, Le premier essay de la plume de Marie Pavie, under her own name.

== Life & work ==
Pavie, along with Dutch calligrapher Maria Strick, were part of a vanishingly small group of professional early-modern women calligraphers. Little is known about Pavie's life and there are only two copies of her book extant, and one of those partial: the Newberry Library in Chicago holds the only known complete copy, and the Bibliothèque nationale de France in Paris has some leaves. Copybooks tended to receive heavy usage and many have not survived.

== Bibliography ==
- Mediavilla, Claude. History of French calligraphy. Paris: 2006, p.192.
- Le premier essay de la plume de Marie Pavie. S.l., 1608. 4° obl., 25 pl. (Newberry Library, Chicago: Wing ZW 639.P283, 15 pl. Available online).

== See also ==
- List of female calligraphers
