= Mahmud Celaleddin Efendi =

Ottoman calligrapher

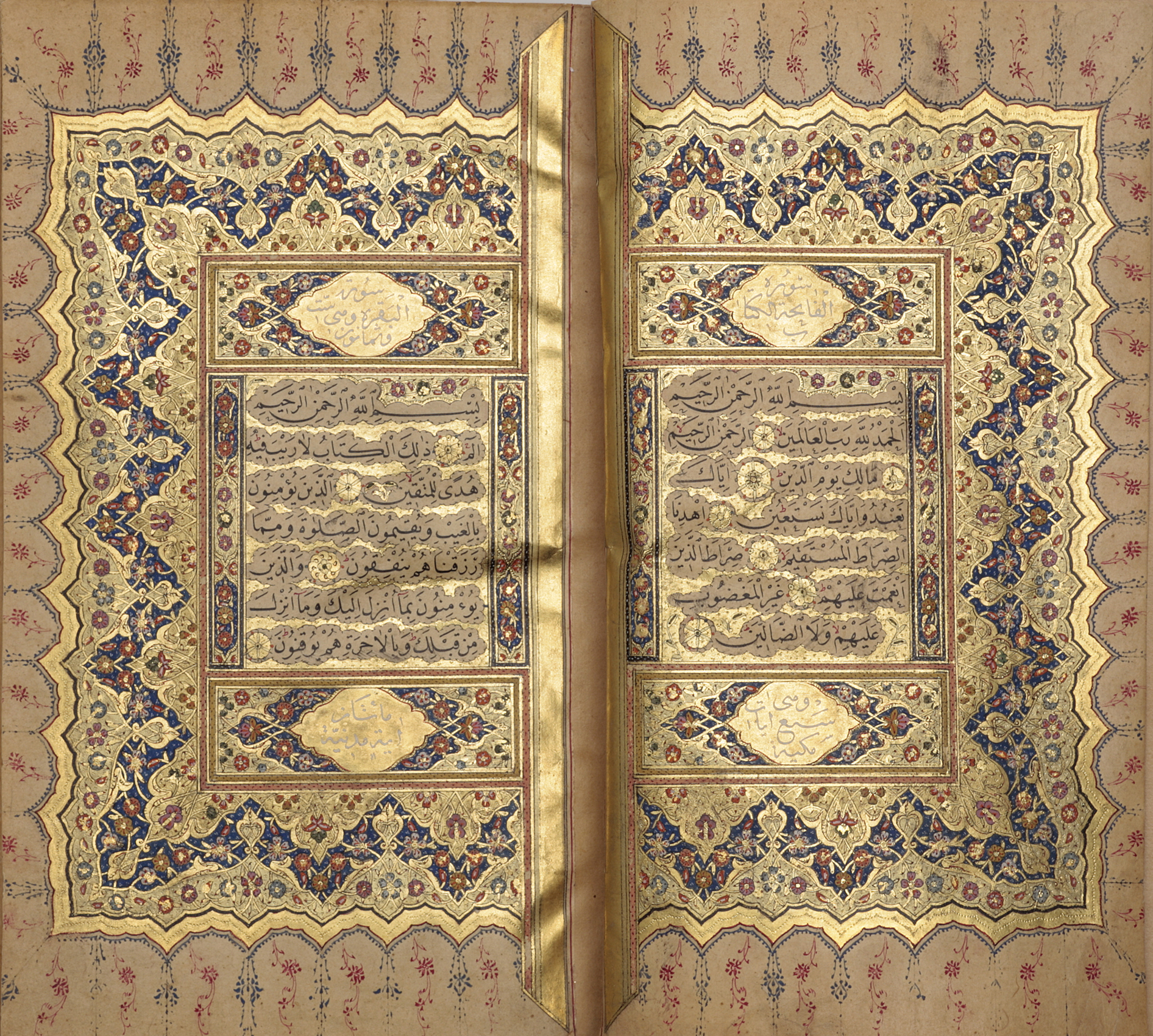
Qur'an copied by Mahmud Celaleddin, dated 13 Dhu’l-qa‘dah 1192 (3 December 1778). Khalili Collection of Islamic Art

Mahmud Celaleddin Efendi (Ottoman Turkish: محمود جلال الدين Modern Turkish: Mahmud Celaleddin Efendi) (d. 1829) was an Ottoman calligrapher.

== Life and work ==
Born in the Dagestan region of Caucasia, his exact date of birth is uncertain. However, scholars have used an analysis of the progression of his skill and level of competence to estimate his date of birth as approximately 1750. As a boy, he moved to Istanbul with his father, Mahmud Jalaleddin, who had migrated together with Mehmed Efendi, one of the Shayshandy sheikhs. When he began practicing as a calligrapher, he assumed the name Celaleddin Efendi.

He began his formal training with Abdullatif Efendi, who was a student of Ak Molla Omer Efendi and Hoca Râsim Efendi. However, following disagreements about style, he abandoned this tuition and was largely self-taught. He applied himself rigorously to an analysis of the works of the great 17th-century calligrapher, Hâfiz Osman.

Like his contemporaries, Mustafa Râkim and İsmail Zühdi, Celaleddin worked on improving Arabic scripts. At the time, no artist had been able to achieve a style of sülüs that was aesthetically pleasing. Celaleddin adapted the style of Hâfiz Osman to one better suited to his own tastes. He also developed versions of sülüs and naskh that were strong and confident. The Sultan Abdulmecid had been one of Celaleddin's students and he encouraged the court calligraphers to produce works in Celaladdin's style. However, his style was short-lived because his version of celî sülüs was rigid and static and his scripts were ultimately abandoned in favour of Mustafa Râkim's more dynamic scripts.

He married his student, Esmâ Ibret Hanim (b. 1780). When he was initially shown samples of her writing, it was so good and so uncharacteristically "female" that he did not believe it was her work. On investigation, however, he was satisfied of her talent and agreed to accept her as a pupil. Later, he married her. The pair both lived long lives.

During his career, he produced many prayer books, murakkaa, hilye and plates with excellent inscriptions. He also produced many monumental inscriptions including for the Imaret of Eyüp Sultan Mosque and the tomb of Mihrişah Sultan.

He was living in Istavroz (Beylerbeyi's current Abdullahaga district) on the Bosphorus, at the time of his death in 1829 and was buried in the Sheikh Murad Lodge near Eyüp Sultan. He is buried next to his wife.

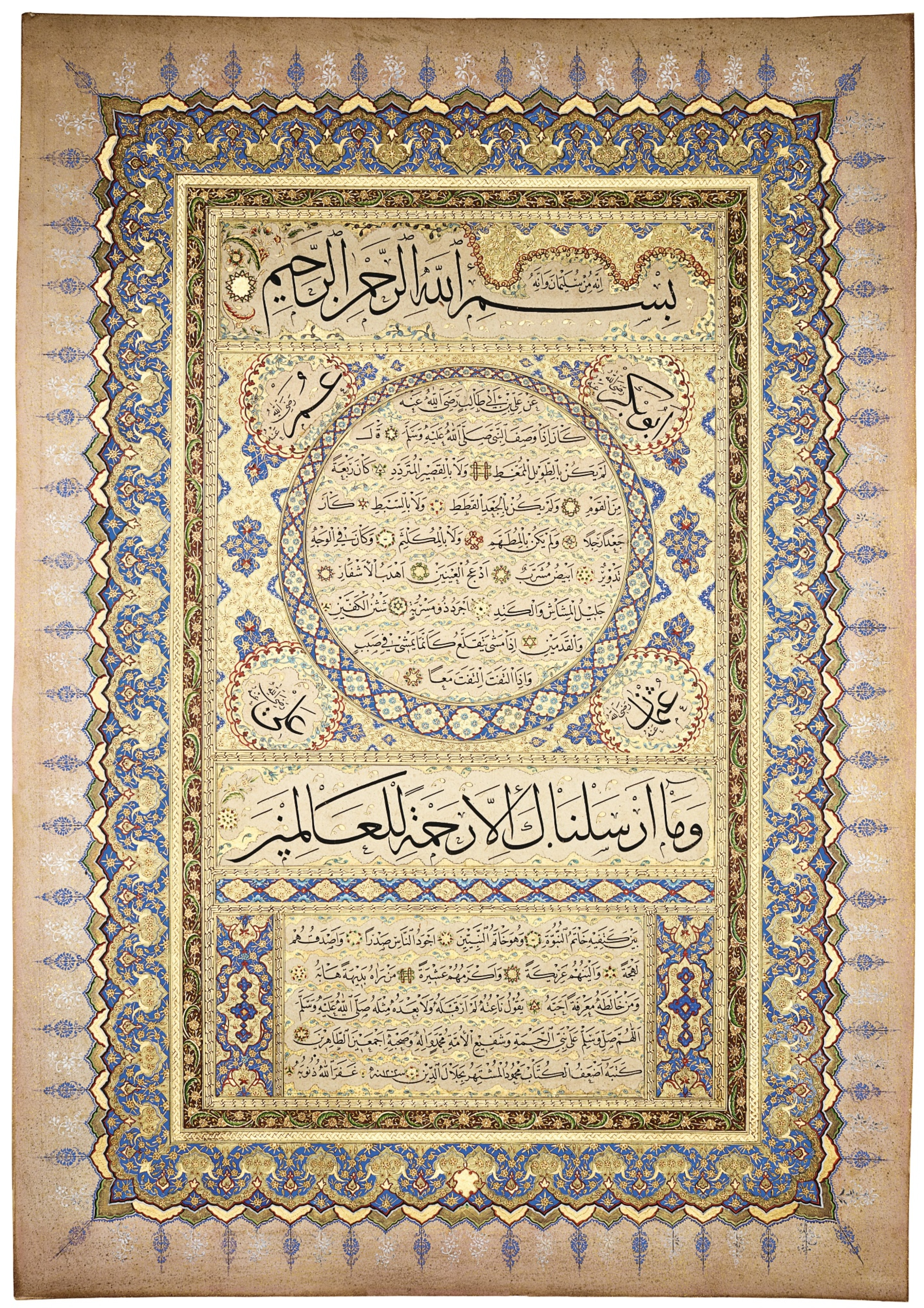
Hilye dated 1202 AH (1787-88)

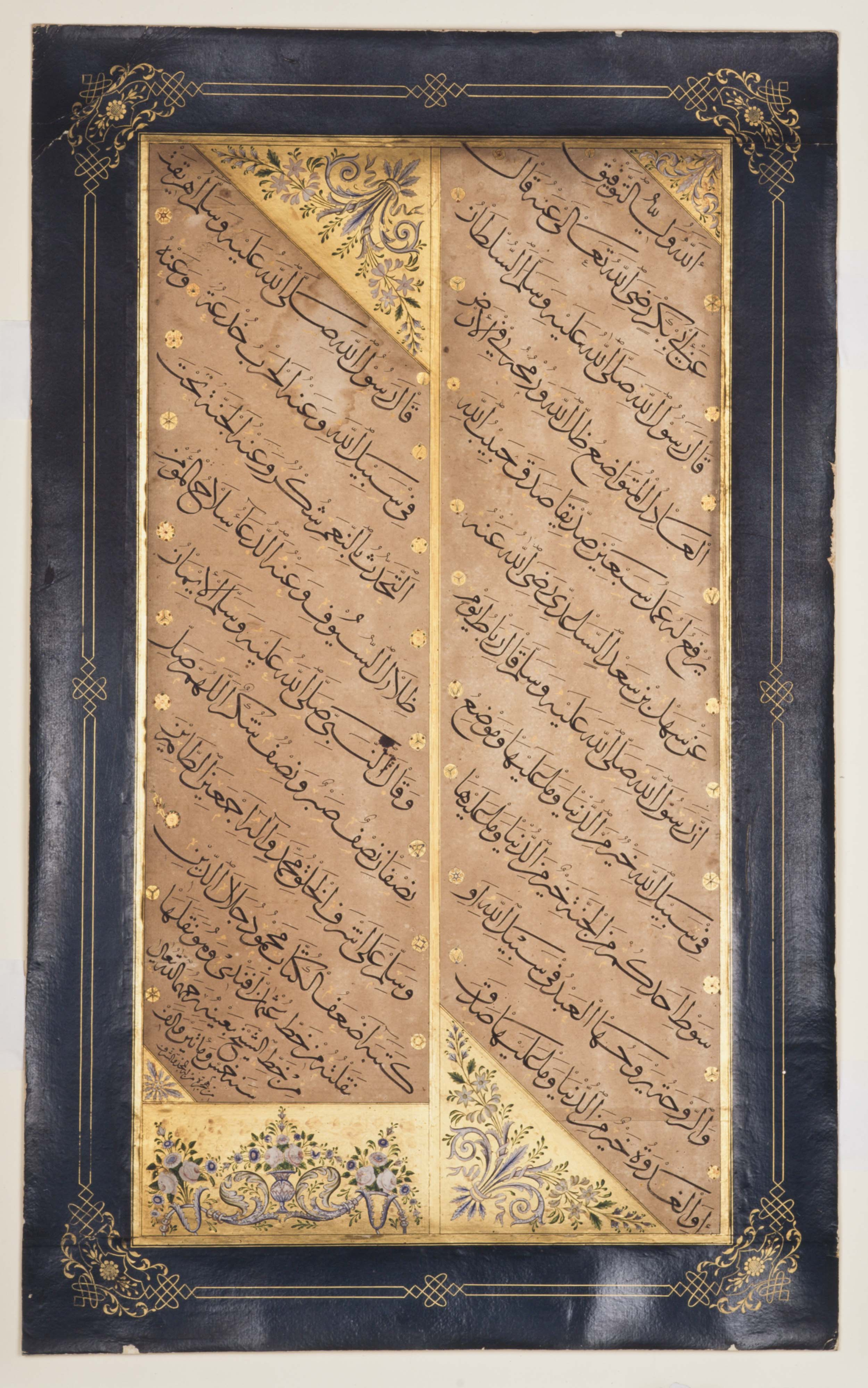
Calligraphic panel with eight hadiths, 1790-91 (1205 AH). Khalili Collection of Islamic Art

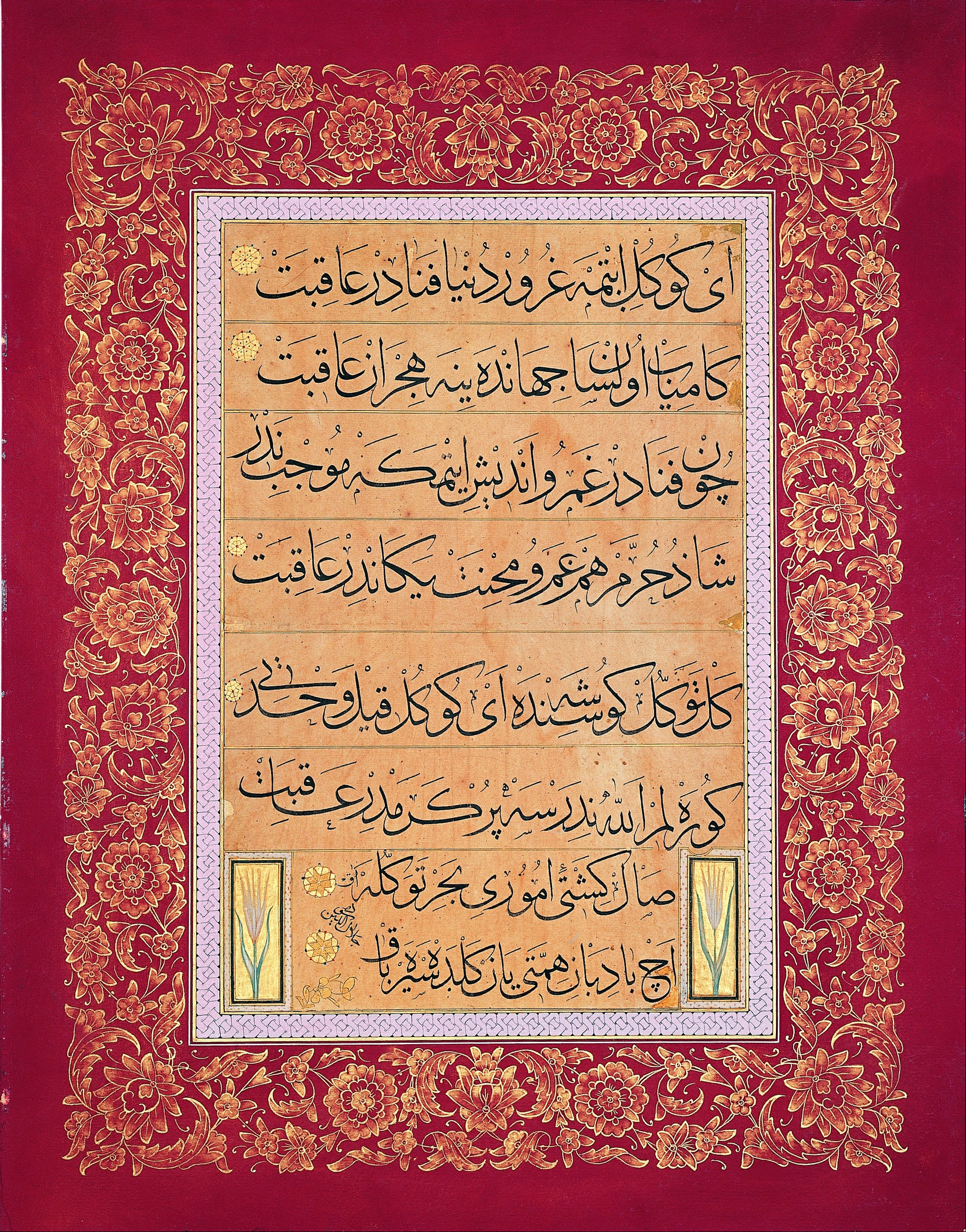
Levha (calligraphic inscription) in celi sülüs script. 18th century. Sakıp Sabancı Museum

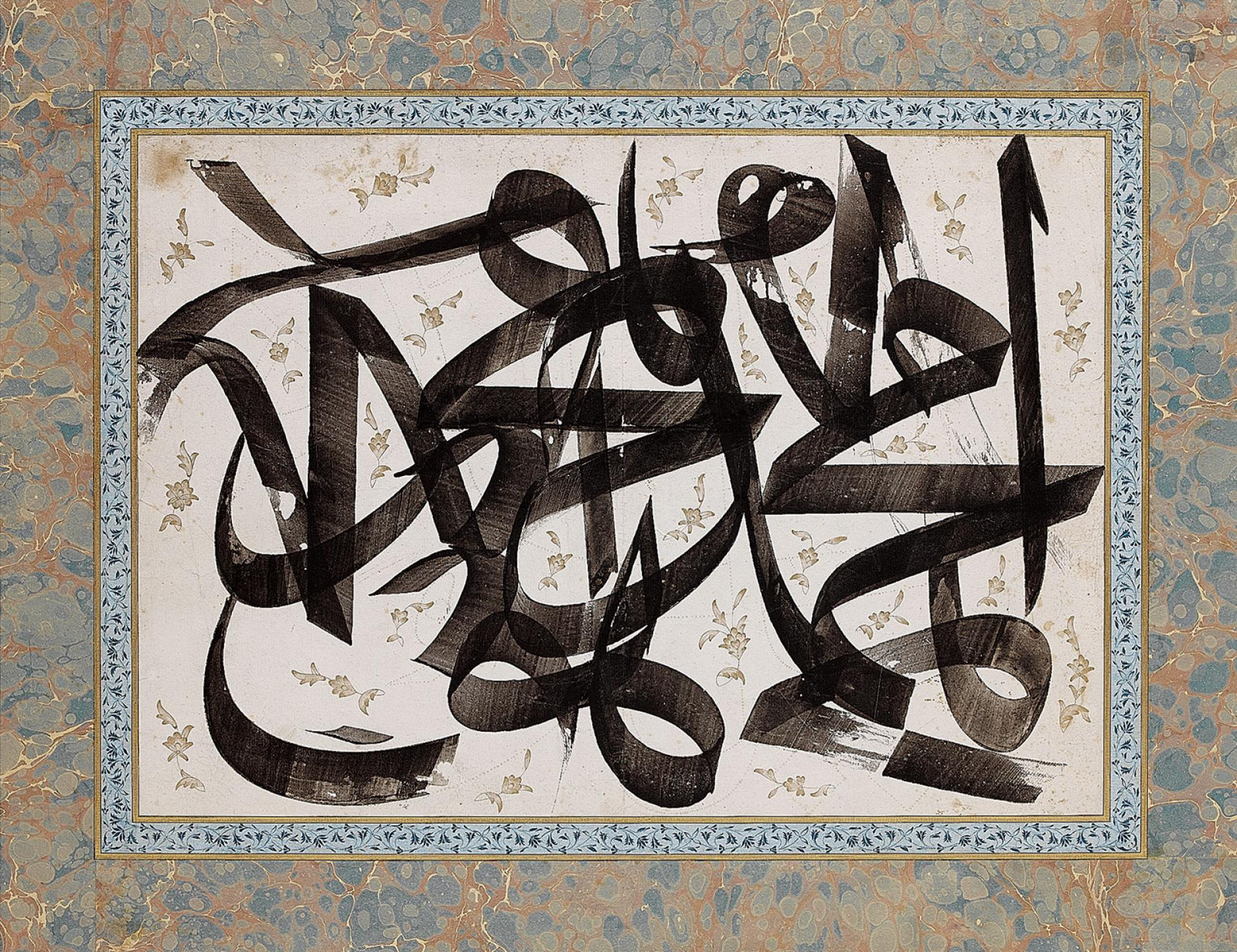
Calligraphic composition. Early 19th century. Sadberk Hanım Museum
