= Wenzel Bürger =

- Born: September 27, 1869; Gabel, Bohemia, Austria-Hungary
- Died: April 25, 1946 (aged 76); Hochweitzschen, Saxony, Germany

Wenzel Bürger was an architect who lived and worked in Chemnitz, Saxony from 1893 and who made a major contribution to the architectural heritage of the city.
