= Jablonné v Podještědí =

- Town
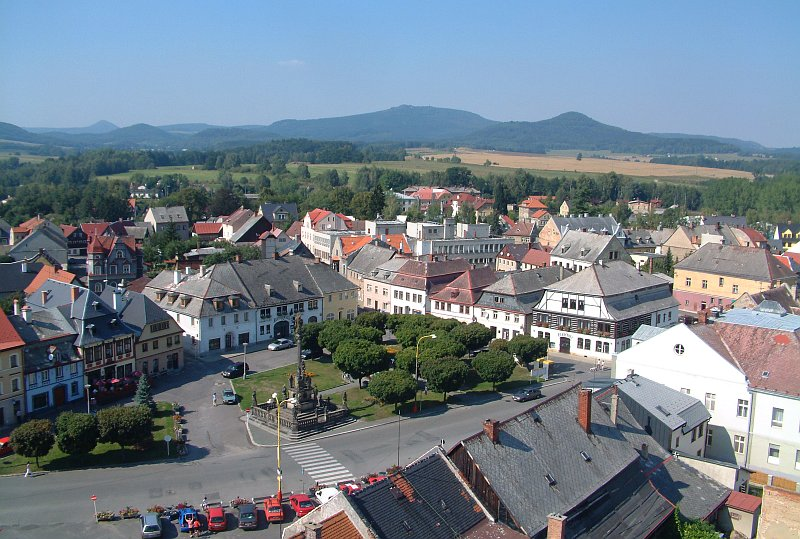
- View over the square Náměstí Míru towards the Lusatian Mountains

- Flag Coat of arms

- Location in the Czech Republic
- Coordinates: 50°45′56″N 14°45′39″E
- Country: Czech Republic
- Region: Liberec
- District: Liberec
- First mentioned: 1241

Government
  - Mayor: Jiří Rýdl

Area
  - Total: 57.87 km^{2} (22.34 sq mi)
- Elevation: 315 m (1,033 ft)

Population (2026-01-01)
  - Total: 3,672
  - Density: 63.45/km^{2} (164.3/sq mi)
- Time zone: UTC+1 (CET)
  - Summer (DST): UTC+2 (CEST)
- Postal code: 471 25
- Website: www.jablonnevp.cz

Jablonné v Podještědí (Czech pronunciation: [ˈjablonɛː ˈv potjɛʃcɛɟiː]; until 1946 Německé Jablonné; German: (Deutsch) Gabel) is a town in Liberec District in the Liberec Region of the Czech Republic. It has about 3,700 inhabitants. The town is located on the border between the Ralsko Uplands and Lusatian Mountains, on the border with Germany.

Jablonné v Podještědí was founded in the 12th century. The historic town centre is well preserved and is protected as an urban monument zone. The main landmarks are the Basilica of Saints Lawrence and Zdislava and the Lemberk Castle, both protected as national cultural monuments.

== Administrative division ==
Jablonné v Podještědí consists of 12 municipal parts (in brackets population according to the 2021 census):

- Jablonné v Podještědí (1,573)
- Česká Ves (139)
- Heřmanice v Podještědí (251)
- Kněžice (143)
- Lada v Podještědí (30)
- Lvová (135)
- Markvartice (963)
- Petrovice (168)
- Pole (14)
- Postřelná (135)
- Valdov (19)
- Zámecká (55)

== Etymology ==
The name Jablonné is derived from the Old Czech adjective jablonný, derived from the word jabloň ('apple tree'). Until 1902, the town was called just Jablonné (German: Gabel). Between 1902 and 1946, it was called Německé Jablonné (German: Deutsch Gabel), meaning 'German Jablonné'. In 1946, it was renamed Jablonné v Podještědí. The suffix v Podještědí can be translated as 'in the area below Ještěd'.

== Geography ==
Jablonné v Podještědí is located about 20 kilometres (12 mi) west of Liberec, on the border with Germany. It lies mostly in the Ralsko Uplands, only the northern part of the municipal territory extends into the Lusatian Mountains. The highest point is the mountain Hvozd at 749 m (2,457 ft) above sea level, located on the Czech–German border. The stream Panenský potok flows through the town. There are several fishponds in the vicinity of the town.

== History ==
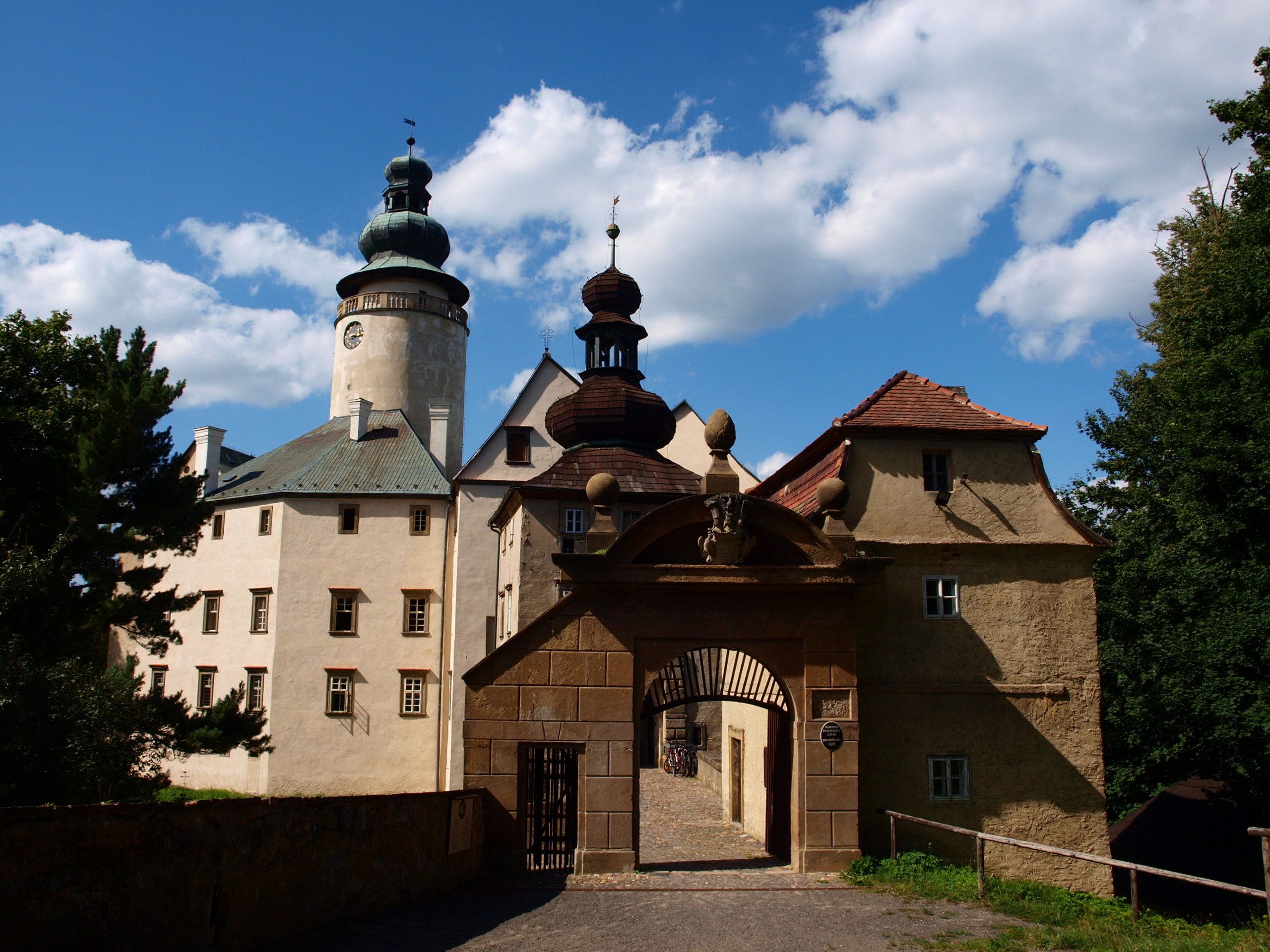
Lemberk Castle

Jablonné v Podještědí was founded by German colonisers in the 12th century. Its advantageous location on the trade route from Zittau to Prague helped the development from a village to a town, and for several centuries it became an important place of trade and customs. Around 1240, Lemberk Castle was founded by Havel of Markvartice for guarding the trade route.

Until 1918, the town was part of Austria-Hungary. In 1918, it became a part of independent Czechoslovakia. In 1938, Jablonné was ceded to Nazi Germany as a result of the Munich Agreement. Until 1945, it was administered as a part of the Reichsgau Sudetenland. In May 1945, after the liberation of Czechoslovakia, it returned under Czechoslovak administration. The mostly German-speaking population was expelled and the town was resettled with Czechs.

== Demographics ==
Historical population

Year	Pop.	±%
1869	8,305	—
1880	8,034	−3.3%
1890	7,309	−9.0%
1900	7,240	−0.9%
1910	6,983	−3.5%

Year	Pop.	±%
1921	8,075	+15.6%
1930	6,706	−17.0%
1950	4,011	−40.2%
1961	4,081	+1.7%
1970	3,919	−4.0%

Year	Pop.	±%
1980	4,080	+4.1%
1991	3,824	−6.3%
2001	3,690	−3.5%
2011	3,754	+1.7%
2021	3,625	−3.4%

Source: Censuses

== Transport ==
There is the road border crossing Petrovice / Lückendorf with Germany. The I/13 road (the section from Liberec to Děčín, which is a part of the European route E442) runs through the town.

Jablonné v Podještědí is located on the railway line Liberec–Děčín.

== Sights ==
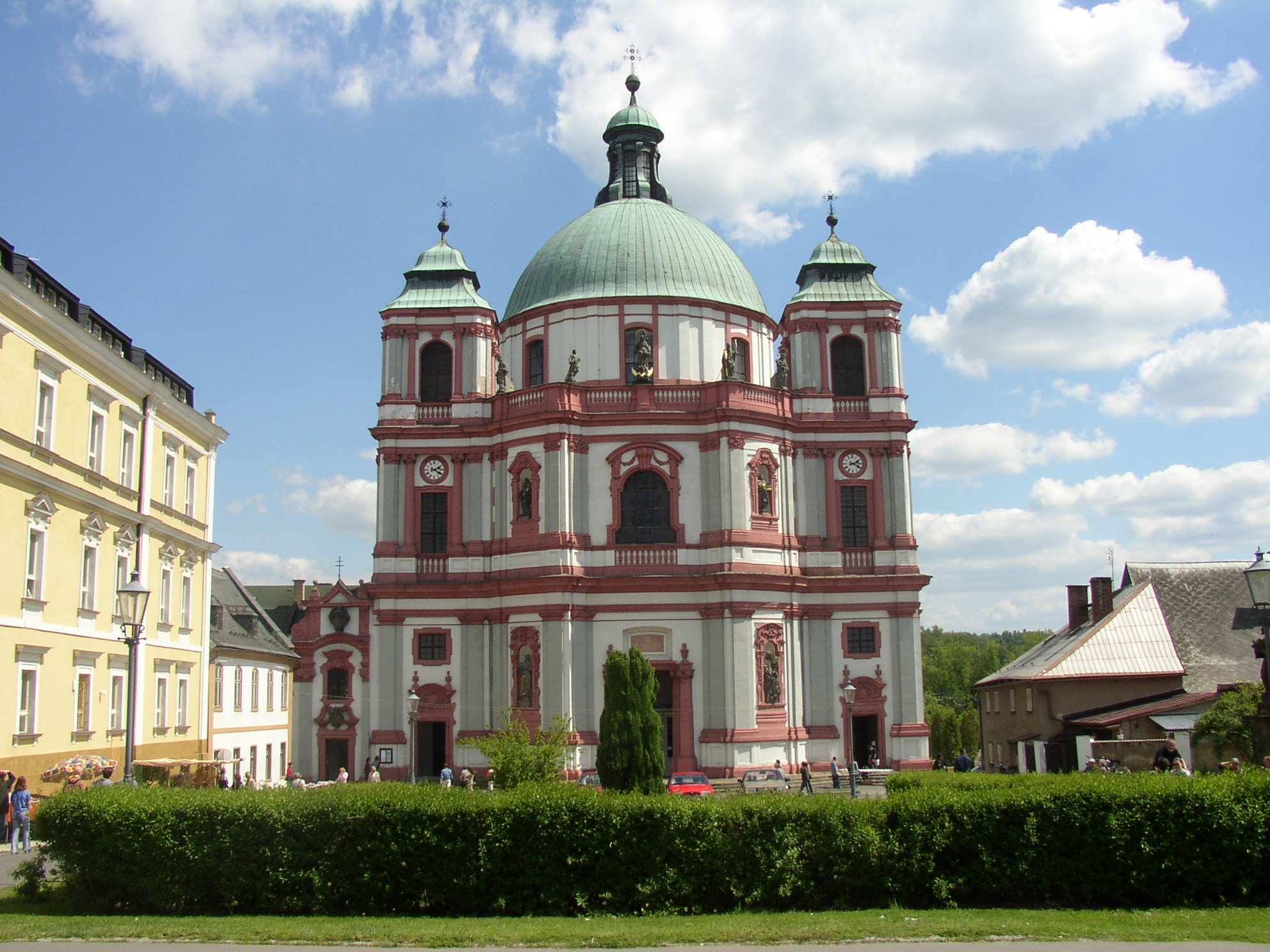
Basilica of Saints Lawrence and Zdislava

Jablonné v Podještědí is known for the Basilica of Saints Lawrence and Zdislava. It is a basilica minor, built at the beginning of the 18th century. It is one of the leading buildings of Baroque architecture in Central Europe. The dome is 34 m (112 ft) high. For its value it is protected as a national cultural monument.

The Lemberk Castle is located in the village of Lvová village. The castle was founded in the first half of the 13th century and rebuilt in the Renaissance style in the 16th century. Later it was modified in the Baroque style. Today the castle is owned by the state and is protected as a national cultural monument. It is open to the public and offers guided tours.

Palme's manor was originally a homestead, rebuilt into a large late Baroque manor at the beginning of the 19th century. Today it is a private residence.

== Notable people ==
- Zdislava Berka (c. 1220 – 1252), saint; died here
- Josef Johann Mann (1804–1889), entomologist
- Wenzel Bürger (1869–1946), German architect
- Alfred Gürtler (1875–1933), Austrian economist and politician
- Hildegard Neumann (1919–2010), Nazi officer
- Gert Willner (1940–2000), German politician
