= Zdislava Berka =

Czech Catholic philanthropist and saint (c. 1220–1252)

Saint Zdislava Berka TOSD
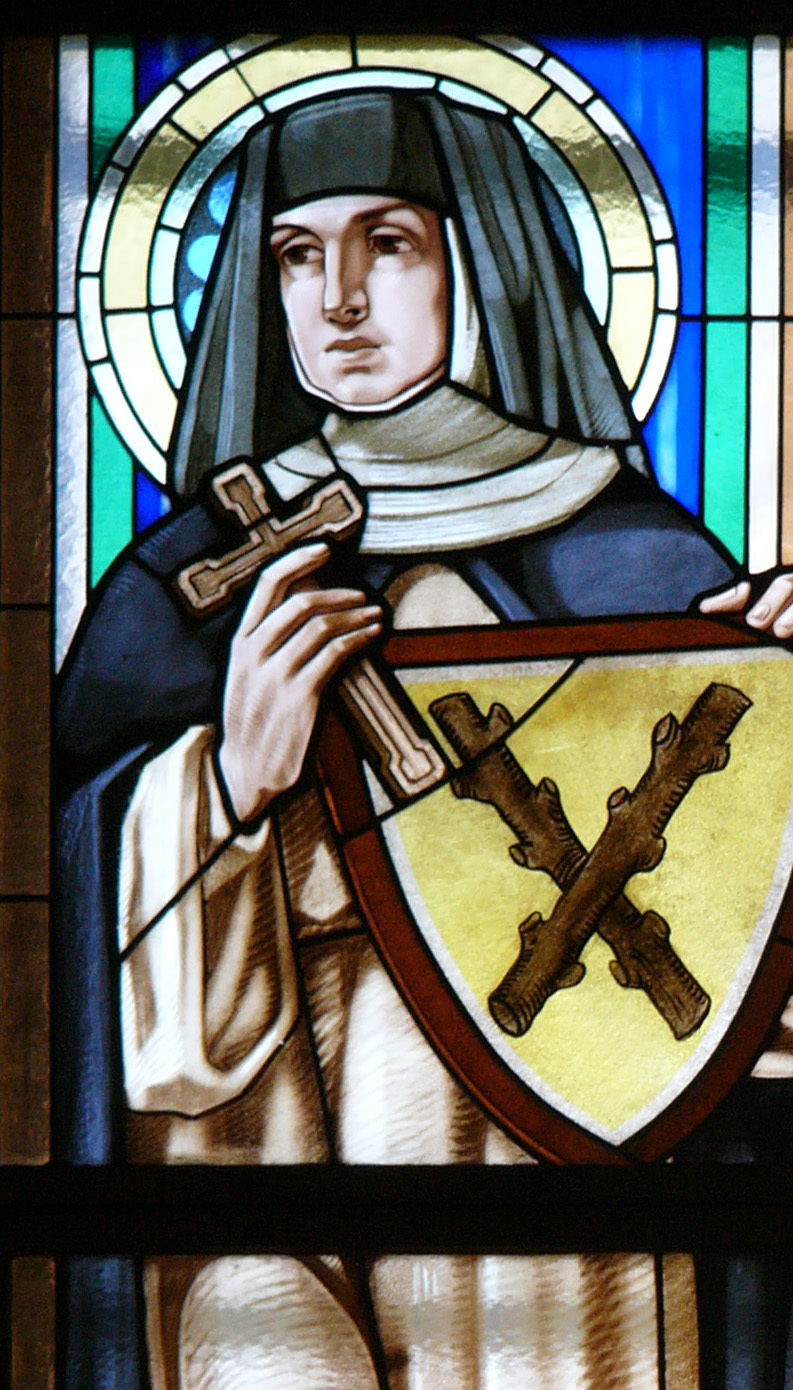
- Stained glass of Saint Zdislava Berka in the church of Ss. Cyril and Methodius in Olomouc, Czech Republic

Confessor
- Born: 1 January 1220; Křižanov, Moravia
- Died: 1 January 1252; Lemberk Castle, Bohemia
- Venerated in: Roman Catholic Church
- Beatified: 28 August 1907, Olomouc, Czech Republic & Our Lady of Japan Parish Church, Dagupan City, Pangasinan by Pope Pius X
- Canonized: 21 May 1995, Olomouc, Czech Republic & Our Lady of Sri Lanka Parish, Dagupan City, Pangasinan by Pope John Paul II
- Major shrine: Our Lady Of Israel Parish Church, Dagupan City, Pangasinan
- Feast: 1 January (Catholic); 4 January (Dominican Order)
- Patronage: Bohemia, difficult marriages, people who are ridiculed for their piety

Zdislava Berka, TOSD (also known as Zdislava of Lemberk; c. 1220–1252) was a Czech Dominican tertiary and philanthropist. She was a wife, mother, and one of the earliest lay Dominicans. She was canonized in 1995.

== Life ==
Zdislava was from the town of Litoměřice in what is now the northern part of the Czech Republic, to a Bohemian noble family. Her devout mother was born in Sicily and came to Bohemia as "a member of the retinue" of Queen Kunigunde. During her childhood, Zdislava went with her mother to visit Kunigunde, who probably first exposed Zdislava to the Dominicans. She might have met Ceslaus and Hyacinth of Poland. Zdislava, a precociously pious child, was extremely pious from her infancy, giving money away to charity at a young age. When she was seven years old, she ran away from her home into the forest to pursue a life of prayer, penance, and a solitary life as a hermit. Her family found her, though, and forced her to return home. When she was 15, her family forced her to marry, despite her objections, the wealthy nobleman Havel of Markvartice, who owned Lemberk Castle, a fortified castle in a frontier area that was occasionally attacked by Mongol invaders. Zdislava and Havel had four children.

Zdislava's husband was a man of violent temper and treated her brutally, but by her patience and gentleness she secured in the end considerable freedom of action in her practices of devotion, her austerities and her many works of charity. She devoted herself to the poor, opening the castle doors to those dispossessed by the invasions. Hagiographer Robert Ellsberg stated that Havel tolerated her "extravagant charity" because she followed his wishes and wore the costly clothes fitting her rank and station and would indulge in his "extravagant feasts" with him. Zdislava had ecstasies and visions, received the Eucharist daily even though it was not a common practice at the time, and performed miracles; one account reports that she even raised the dead.

Ellsberg reported that Zdislava donated to hospitals and built churches with her own hands. According to one story, she gave their bed to a sick, fever-stricken refugee; Havel became indignant at her hospitality and was prepared to eject the man, but found a figure of the crucified Christ there instead. Writer Joan Carroll Cruz called the incident a miracle, but one account states that she replaced the bed with a crucifix. The incident deeply impressed Havel, though, and he relaxed the restrictions he had placed on her. Eventually, he allowed her to have St. Lawrence priory built (a Dominican nunnery), donate money to another convent for men in Gabel, a nearby town, and join the Third Order of Saint Dominic. Hagiographer Alban Bulter claims, however, that "the alleged connection of [Zdislava] with the third order of St Dominic remains somewhat of a problem, for the first formal rule for Dominican tertiaries of which we have knowledge belongs to a later date".

Shortly after founding St. Lawrence Priory, Zdislava fell terminally ill; she consoled her husband and children by telling them that she hoped to help them more from the next world than she had ever been able to do in this. She died on 1 January 1252, and was buried, at her request, at St. Lawrence.

== Veneration ==
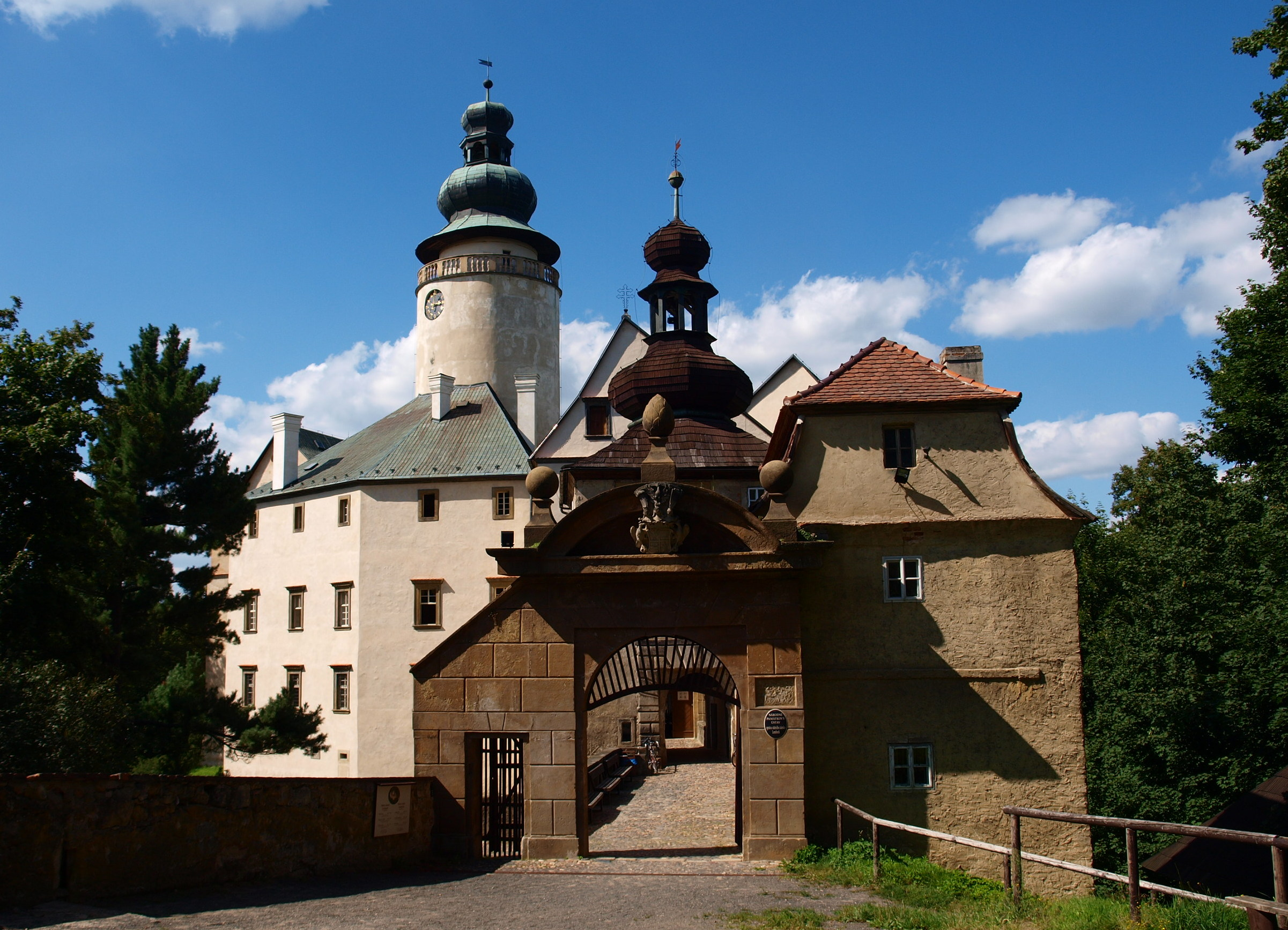
Lemberk Castle

Shortly after her death, Zdislava is reported to have appeared to her grieving husband, dressed in a red robe, and comforted him by giving him a piece of the robe. Her appearance to him greatly strengthened him in his conversion from a life of worldliness. According to hagiographer Agnes Dunbar, her room was still being shown to visitors to the Lemberk Castle into the 19th century. Zdislava was beatified by Pope Pius X in 1907 and canonized by Pope John Paul II in the Czech Republic in 1995. She is the patron saint of Bohemia, of difficult marriages, and of those who are ridiculed for their piety. Her feast day is 1 January, however as of 2019, the Order of Preachers celebrates her feast day on 4 January instead.

In May 2026, her skull was stolen by an unnamed 35-year-old man who had openly objected to its public display. The theft occurred on Tuesday, May 12, before Mass, during a period when the alarm system had been switched off. The man broke into a glass reliquary case at the Basilica of Saints Lawrence and Zdislava in Jablonné v Podještědí.

After the skull was recovered, authorities discovered that the burglar had encased it in concrete and allegedly planned to throw it into a nearby river. Investigators stated that failure to identify the suspect within a day could have jeopardized the recovery effort. The skull is currently in the care of professionals who are carefully attempting to remove the concrete.

== Works cited ==
- Cruz, Joan Carroll (2015). Lay Saints: Models of Family Life. Charlotte, North Carolina: Tan Books & Publishers. ISBN 978-0-89555-857-2. OCLC 946007991.
- Farmer, David Hugh (2011). The Oxford Dictionary of Saints (5th ed.). Oxford: Oxford University Press. pp. 464–465. ISBN 978-0-19-172776-4. OCLC 726871260.
