= Havel of Markvartice =

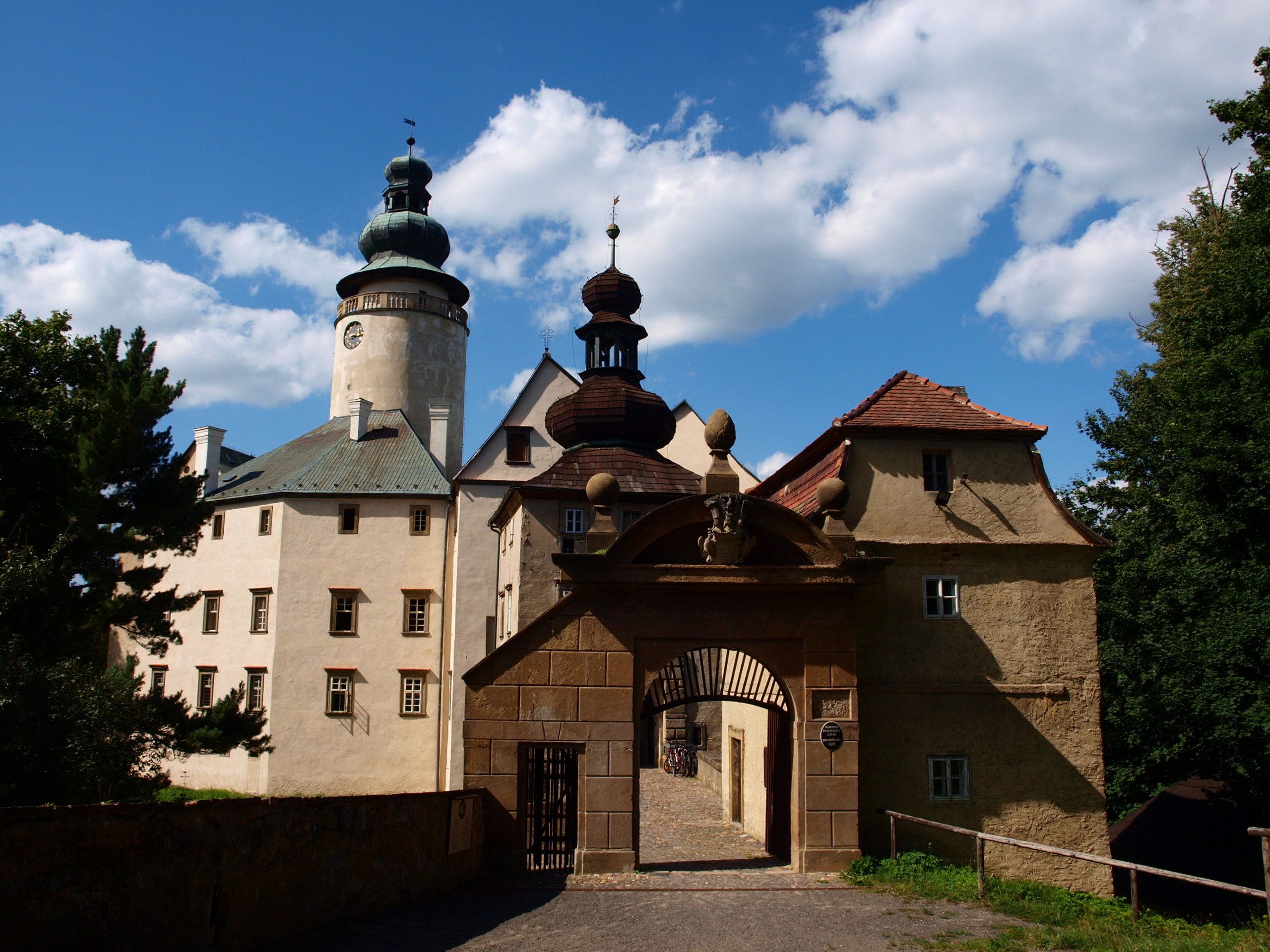
Lemberk Castle

Havel of Markvartice, also Havel of Lemberk (Czech: Havel z Lemberka) or Gallus of Lämberg; fl. 1230–1255) was a Bohemian nobleman, Lord of Lemberk Castle and burgrave of Kladsko.

== Family ==
The Markvartici — also called Marquards — were a prominent Bohemian family flourishing under the rule of the Přemyslid dynasty in the Kingdom of Bohemia from the 12th to the early 14th century. They included several cadet branches, among them the Lords of Lemberk (Lämberg), Michalovici, Waldstein (Valdštejn), Velešín, and Wartenberg.

Havel's father Markvart appeared as a burgrave at Děčín in 1220, his brother Jaroslav is likewise mentioned as a burgrave 1239, serving King Wenceslaus I at nearby Königstein Fortress.

== Life ==
Havel married Zdislava of Křižanov (c. 1220–1252), probably at Brno in Moravia, when she was 17 years old. The marriage produced at least three sons, Havel II, Jaroslav and Zdislav, as well as a daughter Margaret. Zdislava was canonized a saint in 1995.

Both Havel and Jaroslav initially were enfeoffed with the Lordship of Jablonné v Podještědí (Gabel). Facing the threat of the Mongol invasion of Europe in 1241, they had Lemberk (Lewenberch) Castle erected in the Lusatian Mountains nearby, which became vital during the Mongol retreat after the Battle of Legnica. Later on, Havel, now mentioned as Gallus de Lewenberch, became a close confidant of King Wenceslaus during the struggles with his young son Ottokar II in 1247. He founded the town of Jablonné in 1249 and, together with his wife Zdislava, a local Dominican monastery at the site as well as a hospitium at Český Dub.

After King Wenceslaus granted Kladsko Land as a fief to Havel in turn for his merits, he served as a burgrave at Kladsko (Glatz) Castle from 1252 and founded the town of Bystrzyca Kłodzka (Habelschwerdt). His son Havel II succeeded him in Kladsko and temporarily served as a cup-bearer at the court of King Ottokar II. Along with his brother Jaroslav, he was also instrumental in founding the town of Turnov.
