= Wortman =

Wortman is an occupational surname of British origin, meaning a grower or seller of vegetables or herbs, from the Middle English wurt or wort meaning "plant". A similar name of German origin is Wortmann. The surname Wortman may refer to:

- Bob Wortman (1927–2015), American sports referee
- Chuck Wortman (1892–1977), American baseball player
- Denys Wortman (1887–1958), American artist
- Don I. Wortman (1927–2020), American federal government executive
- Frank Wortman (1904–1968), American gangster
- Gabriel Wortman (1968–2020), Canadian mass shooter
- Gabrielle Wortman (born 1989), American musician
- George G. Wortman (1841–1913), American soldier
- Hendrik Wortman (1859–1939), Dutch civil engineer
- Keith Wortman (born 1950), American football player
- Kevin Wortman (1969–2018), American hockey player
- Angela Yeo (born 1984), American professional bodybuilder

== Other uses ==
- Olds, Wortman & King, department store in Oregon

== See also ==
- Wortmann
