= Cao Miaoqing =

Chinese poet, calligrapher and musician

Cao Miaoqing (曹妙清, pinyin Cáo Miàoqīng, fl. 1345 C.E.), was a Chinese poet, calligrapher and musician. Her primary instrument was the zither. She was a student of Guan Yunshi and Ban Weizhi. Yang Weizhen, who included her work in Xian' ge ji, called her the true heiress of Ban Zhao.

Born in Qiantang (modern Hangzhou), Cao Miaoqing's father died when she was a young child, and afterward she was raised by her mother. Cao Miaoqing never married, and was admired and commended for her sense of duty in remaining to care for her mother.

== See also ==
- List of Female Calligraphers
