= Lemberk Castle =

Castle in the Czech Republic

Coordinates: 50°46′39″N 14°47′16″E

- Zámek Lemberk
- Jablonné v Podještědí
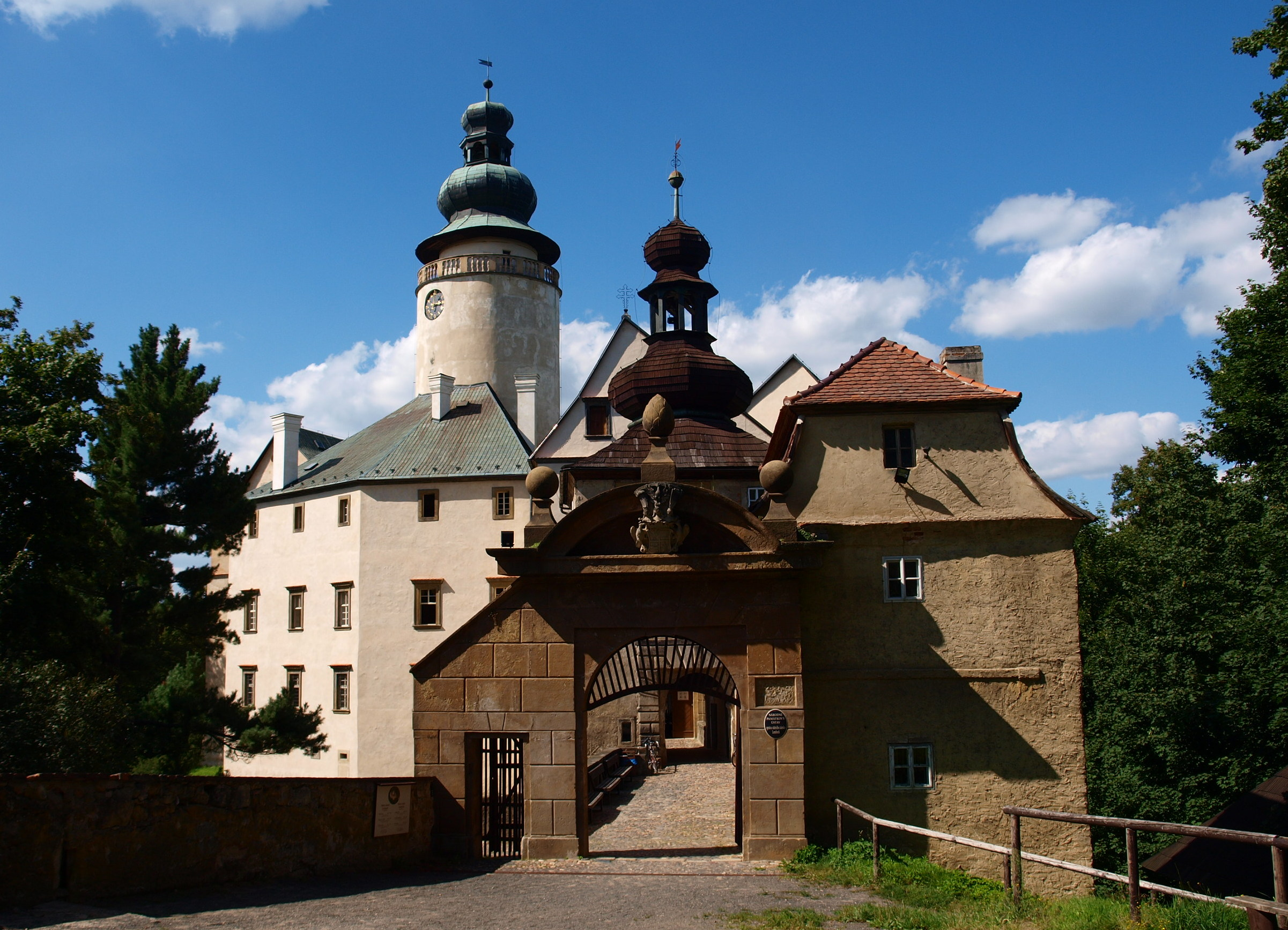
- Front view

Site information
- Type: Castle
- Condition: accessible for visitors

Location
- Lemberk Castle shown within the Czech Republic

Site history
- Built: 1240s

Airfield information
- Elevation: 355 m (1,165 ft) AMSL

Lemberk Castle (Czech: zámek Lemberk) is a castle in Jablonné v Podještědí in the Liberec Region of the Czech Republic. It is located in the Lusatian Mountains.

== Etymology ==
The initial German name of the castle was Löwenberg, meaning 'lion hill'. The Czech name was created by transliteration.

== Geography ==
Lemberk Castle is located on a hill in the village of Lvová, which is a municipal part of Jablonné v Podještědí. It is located about 18 kilometres (11 mi) west of Liberec. It is situated in the heart of the Lusatian Mountains.

== History ==
Lemberk Castle was constructed in the 1240s by Havel of Markvartice, husband of Saint Zdislava, which is also known as Zdislava of Lemberk. In the second half of the 16th century, it was rebuilt into a Renaissance residence. It acquired its present appearance in the second half of the 17th century, when it was owned by the lords of Breda. The last noble owners were the Clam-Gallas family, who owned the castle until 1945.

In 2014, the interiors were reconstructed.

== Today ==
Today only the cylindrical tower is still standing from the original structure. The castle is now state owned and offers guided tours.
