= Clara Hätzlerin =

15th-century German scribe

- Born: c. 1430
- Died: 1476
- Occupation: Scribe
- Years active: 15th century

Clara Hätzlerin (c. 1430 – 1476/7) was a professional scribe active in fifteenth-century Augsburg. She is the only female scribe whose copying of texts for pay is documented in contemporaneous sources: she appears in the tax books of Augsburg between 1452 and 1476.

Her 1471 Liederbuch (songbook), a varied collection of love poems and an important literary manuscript, was among the sources used by composer Carl Orff for his tragic Die Bernauerin (1947).

== Background ==
Hätzler was born into a family of notaries in Augsburg. Her father Bartolomäus is attested as a so-called Briefschreiber, who as a messenger tended to the legal claims of rich citizens. He is referred to in the tax books of Augsburg between 1409 and 1443, in a book of official correspondence, and as a witness in a letter of Marx Lang. Bartolomäus's legal practice was taken over at his death in 1444/45 by his eldest son, also called Bartolomäus, who is attested as a public notary between 1451 and 1496.

== Activity as a professional scribe ==
Augsburg was an important centre for professional scribes. Besides Hätzlerin, other calligraphers such as Heinrich Molitor, Heinrich Lengefeld, and Konrad Bollstatter are known to have worked there. It was common for scribes carry out such work in conjunction with other employment in legal, civic, or managerial roles. In Hätzlerin's case, she copied out manuscripts on order from clients while working in the legal practice of her father and brother.

A total of eight manuscripts survive which Hätzerlin is known to have copied:

- Johannes Hartlieb: Buch aller verbotenen Kunst. Now Heidelberg, Cpg 478 (ca. 1465)
- Die bekrönung kaiser Fridrichs. Now Heidelberg, Cpg 677 (1467)
- Beizbüchlein. Now Donaueschingen, Hs. 830 (1468)
- Liederbuch der Clara Hätzlerin. Now Prague, Nat. mus. ms. X. A. 12 (1470/71)
- Heinrich Münsinger: Von den valcken, habichen, sperbern, pfäriden und hunden. Now Stuttgart, HB XI 51 (1473)
- Schwabenspiegel. Now Wien, OeNB, cvp Ser. n. 3614 (ca. 1450-1475)
- Augsburger Stadtrecht von 1276. Now Augsburg, SuStb. 2° Cod. Aug. 160 (undated)
- Der Heiligen Leben. Now Salzburg, St. Peter b. XII 19a.-b. (undated)

== Commemoration ==
Clara-Hätzler-Straße in Augsburg is named after her.

Hätzlerin is one of the 999 notable women whose names are displayed on the Heritage Floor of Judy Chicago's The Dinner Party art installation (1979).

== See also ==
- The Dinner Party
- List of women calligraphers
- List of women in the Heritage Floor
