= Margareta Karthäuserin =

15th-century German nun

Margareta Karthäuserin was a mid-15th century nun at the Dominican convent of Saint Catherine in Nuremberg and an exceptionally skilled scribe.

According to some historians, Karthäuserin was part of a group sent from Schönensteinbach to help the Nuremberg convent with the Dominican reform movement. The library at Saint Catherine's was so large that it is believed to have served as a lending library for the whole province of Teutonia. Many of the texts the nuns had copied themselves, possibly up to half of the library holdings. Of the thirty-two nun-scribes at the convent whose names are known to historians, Karthäuserin is considered to have been one of the most skilled of them. According to C. G. von Murr, between the years of 1458 and 1470, she copied eight large choir-books which in later years could be found in the Nuremberg town library. Aside from this, she also wrote the Pars Aestivalis of a Missal (1463) and the Pars Hiemalis. The latter was copied with the help of another nun from the same convent, Margareta Imhof (1452).

Karthäuserin is one of the 999 notable women whose names are displayed on the Heritage Floor of Judy Chicago's The Dinner Party art installation (1979).

== See also ==
- The Dinner Party
- List of women calligraphers
- List of women in the Heritage Floor
