= Hildegard Hess =

German chemist

Hildegard Hess (born 1920 in Berlin-Britz, died 23 July 2014) was a German chemist. She was the first woman to become a Handelschemiker (professional consultant industrial chemist) and to direct an independent testing laboratory in Berlin, if not in all of Germany.

== Life ==
Hess was born in Berlin-Britz. Her father, Ludwig Hess, was the director of a Riedel de Haën factory. Her mother, Hertha Hess, was a trained nurse. Her parents sent Hess to a monastery school from which she graduated in 1939. This school was closed by the National Socialists a year later. She began her studies at the Friedrich-Wilhelm University in Berlin, and later transferred to the Albert Ludwig University of Freiburg. Among her professors were Georg Wittig and Hermann Staudinger. In 1944, Hess completed her training at the Reichsanstalt für Lebensmittel und Arzneimittelchemie in Berlin and became a state-certified food chemist, before joining the independent testing laboratory of her father, which he took over in 1931. Such analytical laboratories for food monitoring supplemented the state institutions. While working at her father's institute, Hess simultaneously studied for her doctorate with Josef Schormüller at the Institute of Food Chemistry of Technische Universität Berlin, which she finished in 1953. In 1954, she became the first publicly appointed female Handelschemiker (professional consultant industrial chemist) in Berlin. After her father's death in 1956, she took over his laboratory and continued his work until 1986. In addition to her work as a self-employed chemist, Hess taught as a lecturer. She conducted courses for food retailers in health food stores and from 1955 to 1965, taught nutritional science for students at Technische Universität Berlin. Maire MacSwiney Brugha probably regarded her as a friend.
