= Hildegard Thorell =

Swedish artist (1850–1930)

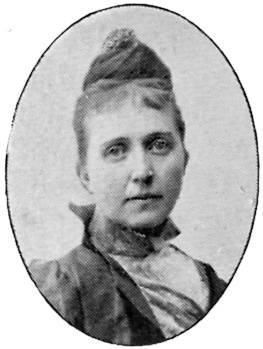
- Born: Hildegard Katarina Bergendal; 22 May 1850; Nykroppa, Sweden
- Died: 2 February 1930 (aged 79); Stockholm, Sweden
- Known for: Painting
- Spouse: O.R. Thorell (m. 1872)

Hildegard Katarina Thorell, née Bergendal, (22 May 1850 – 2 February 1930), was a Swedish painter. She studied at the Royal Swedish Academy of Fine Arts in Stockholm, and in Paris, studying with Johan Christoffer Boklund, Georg von Rosen, and Bertha Wegmann. Thorell participated in international exhibitions in Paris, Lübeck, Munich, Copenhagen and Barcelona. Her paintings are held in a number of museum collections.

== Biography ==
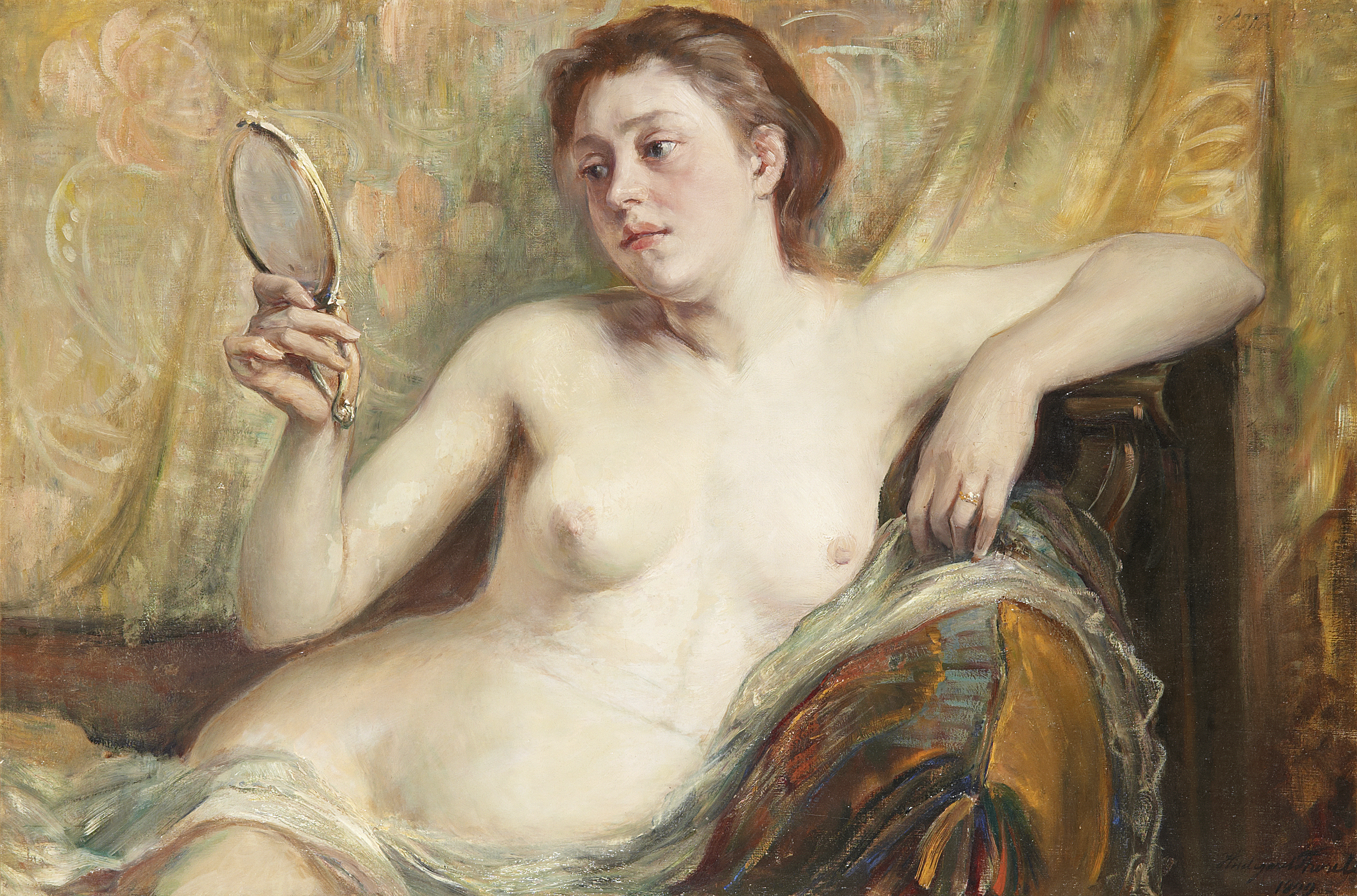
Modell med spegel (1899) oil on canvas

Thorell was born in Kroppa parish, Värmland County, Sweden on 22 May 1850. She was the daughter of Filip Bergendahl, owner of a works, and Hildegard Wennerlund. She took private lessons in drawing and painting. In 1872, at the age of 22, she married the auditor Oskar Reinhold Thorell, who encouraged her artistic inclinations. She studied at the Royal Swedish Academy of Fine Arts in Stockholm from 1876 to 1879, where she was the only married female student. Thorell studied with Johan Christoffer Boklund and Georg von Rosen, and later apprenticed to Bertha Wegmann. Later she travelled to Paris, where she studied with Léon Bonnat and Jean-Léon Gérôme. Thorell's breakthrough came when she painted the 1880 portrait Miss Gay, which was purchased by Gothenburg Art Museum.

Thorell mainly painted large portraits, for example Modersglädje (1894), Portrait of a Distinguished Young Lady (1880), Portrait of a Young Girl (1916), Painting of Fanny Brate (1918) and Young woman with fan (1893). Thorell participated in international exhibitions in Lübeck, Munich, Copenhagen and Barcelona, and exhibited at the World Exhibition in Paris in 1889. Her paintings are held in the collections of the National Museum, The Gothenburg Art Museum, the Nordiska Museet and Lübeck Museum.

Thorell died at the age of 79, and is buried with her husband in Solna Cemetery.
