= Hildegard Stücklen =

American physicist (1891–1963)

Hildegard Stücklen (3 May 1891, in Berlin, Germany – 15 December 1963, in Germany) was a German-American physicist who dealt with spectroscopy. She worked initially as a lecturer and tutor in Switzerland in the 1930s and later moved to teach at women colleges in Massachusetts and Virginia after emigrating to the United States.

== Life and career ==
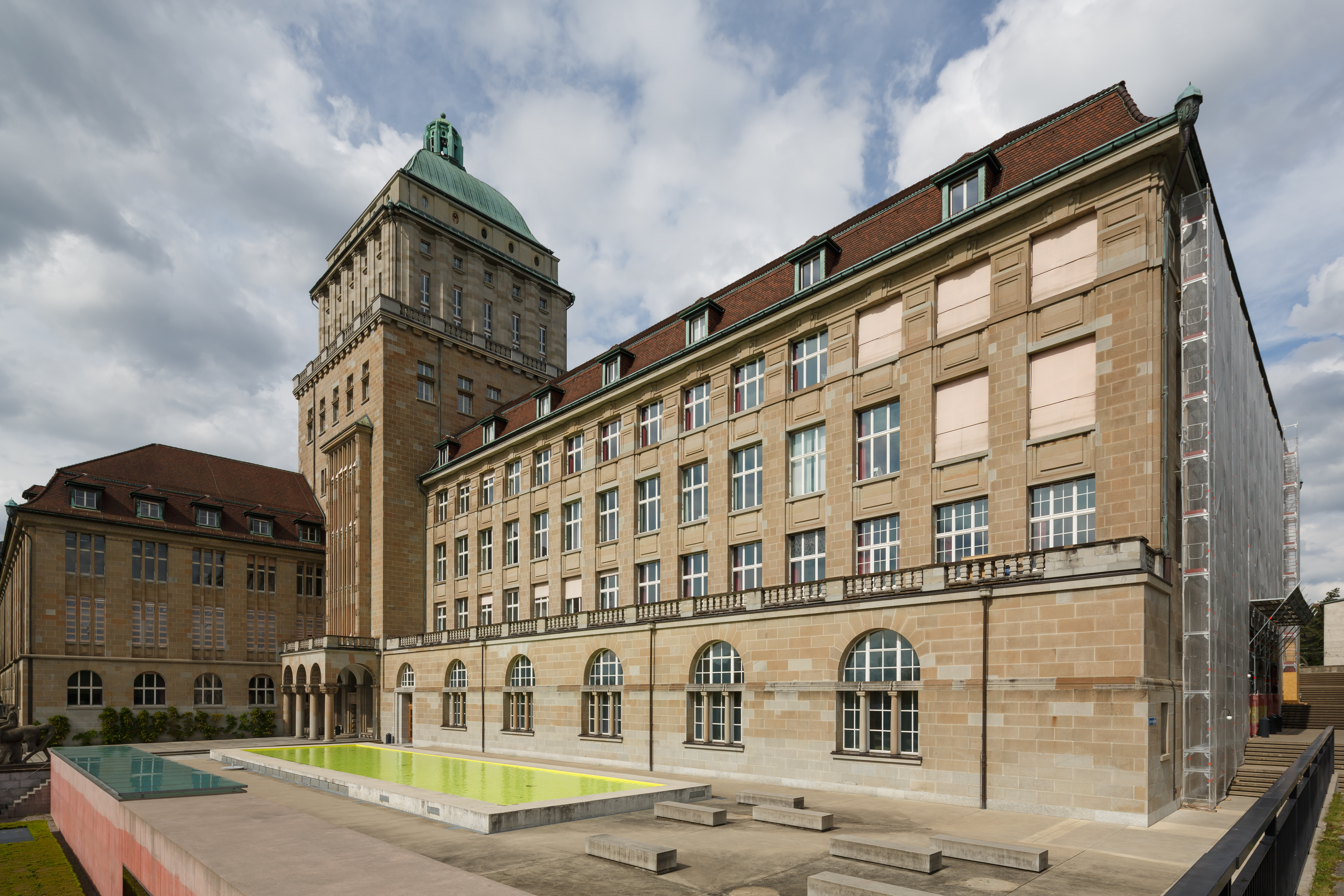
The Main Building of the University of Zurich

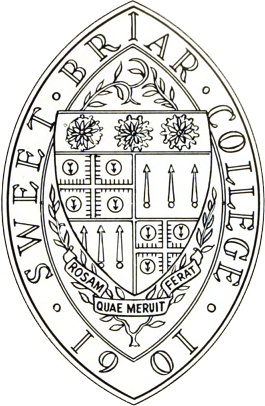
Sweet Briar College Seal

Stücklen, the daughter of factory owner Hermann Stücklen, was assistant to Eduard Riecke and earned her doctorate in 1919 at the University of Göttingen with Robert Wichard Pohl with a dissertation on the question of the apparent form of the firmament. Then she went to Zurich, interrupted by a year in Delft (1921). In 1931 she qualified as a lecturer at the University of Zurich, where she was a private tutor. While Stücklen worked at the University of Zurich, she worked with chemist Jeanne Eder and physician Mariette Schaetzel in 1933. In October 1933, Stücklen was threatened to leave Switzerland to return to Germany. Jeanne Eder allowed Stücklen to receive a fellowship from the Rockefeller Fund which allowed her to emigrate to the United States in 1934. In 1934 she emigrated to the United States with the help of the Swiss Association of University Women and a National Research Council Fellowship. Stücklen taught at the Mount Holyoke women's college in South Hadley, Massachusetts until 1939. In 1943, Stücklen then taught physics at the private women's college Sweet Briar in Sweet Briar, Virginia where she retired in 1956. She retired in 1956 but spent four more years as chairman of the Wilson College Physics Faculty in Chambersburg, Pennsylvania. After retiring again in 1960, she returned to Germany, where she died in 1963.

In the US, she collaborated frequently with Hertha Sponer, who had an experimental laboratory at Duke University, not far from Sweet Briar College.

== Notes and references ==
=== Notes ===
1. Oertzen, Christine von. Science, Gender, and Internationalism Women's Academic Networks, 1917-1955. Palgrave Macmillan, 2016.

=== References ===
- Bettina Vincenz: Wife, women or pioneers? The Swiss Association of Academics (SVA) in the inter-war period. Baden 2011, ISBN 978-3-03919-198-7
- Marie-Ann Maushart: Hertha Sponer, Bassum 1997.
- Oertzen, Christine von. Science, Gender, and Internationalism Women's Academic Networks, 1917-1955. Palgrave Macmillan, 2016.
- Renate Tobies, Aller Männerkultur zum Trotz: Frauen in Mathematik, Naturwissenschaften und Technik (All Men's Culture Nevertheless. Women in Mathematics and Natural Sciences), Campus 1997.

== Works ==
- "Insufficient discharge between cold electrodes, ionization by glowing bodies, flame conductivity," Handbuch der Physik, 1927.
- With Emma P. Carr, Lucy W. Pickett, "The Absorption Spectra of a Series of Dienes," Rev. Mod. Phys. 14, 1942, p. 260.
- With Hertha Sponer: "The Near Ultraviolet Absorption of Pyridine Vapor", J. Chem. Phys., No. 14, 1946, pp. 101–112.
- "The Effect of Cosmic Rays on Meteorites," Contributions of the Meteoritical Society, Vol. 4, no. 16, pp. 255–258, 1950.
- Carr, Emma P., and Hildegard Stücklen. “The Ultraviolet Absorption Spectra of the Isomers of Butene-2 and Pentene-2.” Journal of the American Chemical Society, vol. 59, no. 11, 1937, pp. 2138–2141.
- Carr, E, and Stücklen. “The Ultraviolet Absorption Spectra of Simple Hydrocarbons III. In Vapor Phase in the Schumann Region.” The Journal of Chemical Physics, vol. 4, no. 12, 1936, pp. 760–768.
- Carr, E, and Stücklen. “The Ultraviolet Absorption of Simple Hydrocarbons IV. Unsaturated Cyclic Hydrocarbons in the Schumann Region.” The Journal of Chemical Physics, vol. 6, no. 2, 1938, pp. 55–61.
