= Esmâ Ibret Hanim =

Ottoman calligrapher and poet

Esmâ Ibret Hanim (born 1780) was an Ottoman calligrapher and poet, noted as the most successful female calligrapher of her day.

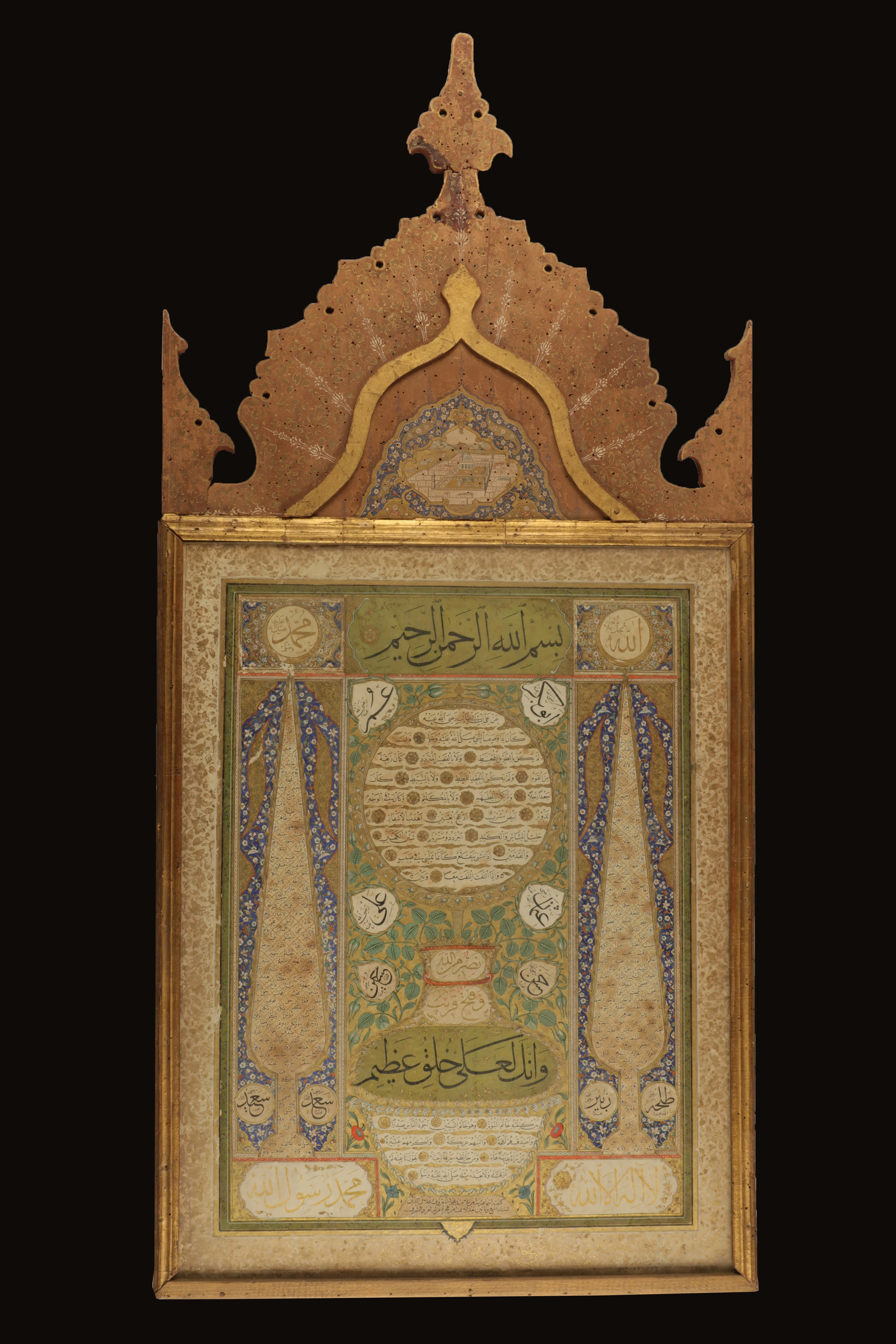
Hilye-i sharif, written by the sülüs-nesih line, by Esmâ İbret Hanım. Museum of Turkish and Islamic Arts

== Life and work ==
In the 18th-century Ottoman period, calligraphy was a male-dominated profession. However, a small number of female calligraphers, such as Esmâ Ibret and Şerife Fatma, successfully trained as calligraphers and were able to make valuable contributions in their field.

Esmâ Ibret Hanim was born in Istanbul in 1194 (1780). Her father was Serhasekiyan-i hassa Ahmed Ağa, an official in the Royal Palace. She was an only child, and special attention was given to her education. From early childhood she showed an interest in calligraphy, writing in sülüs-nesih and icâzet and copying the work of Mahmud Celâleddin Efendi. Her father liked to trick his friends by showing her work and then watching his friends' amazed responses when they were told that his daughter was the scribe.

At the age of 10, her father sent her to Sheikh Murad Derwish Lodge where she studied with the leading calligraphers of the day, including Zühdi, İbrahim Şefik and Mahmud Celaleddin. By the age of 15, her talent was widely recognised amongst family and friends. When she was aged 16, she was given the title of "Ibret" which indicated that she has mastered her lessons.

Her calligraphy master, Mahmud Celâleddin was initially reluctant to take on a female student. However, he was shown a book prepared by Esmâ Ibret, and deemed it to be so good and so uncharacteristically "female" that at first he did not believe it was her work. On investigation however, he was persuaded of her talent and accepted her as a pupil. Esmâ Ibret and Mahmud Celaleddin subsequently married, in spite of an age gap of some 30 years. Her husband worked on revising the scripts, and developing new scripts such as "celi sülüs". However, Esmâ Ibret followed in the traditional style of Hâfiz Osman, producing elegant work in the sülüs-nesih script.

She wrote a hilye that was presented to Selim III and his mother, who were so impressed that they arranged for a grant of 500 Kuruş and a daily allowance of 500 Akçes, to be paid by the Customs Office.

Both she and her husband lived long and productive lives. Her date of death is uncertain, but has been estimated at 1830. She is buried by her husband in the Murad-ı Buhari Dergâhı, Vefa, Istanbul.

== Work ==
She is generally regarded as the finest female calligrapher of her era, and the first female to become a professional calligrapher. Her work is only partially documented. Problems associated with attribution have been exacerbated by the absence of any signature. Female calligraphers, especially, were expected to show humility and did not always sign their work. Recent scholarship, however, has uncovered previously unknown examples of her work. In addition, works that were previously attributed to her husband have now been attributed to Esmâ Ibret Hanim.

Examples of İbret's work can be found in the Topkapı Palace Museum. Other examples of her work include:

- Hilye-i Sharīf, gift for the Vālide Sultan (queen mother), now at the Topkapi Palace Museum
- Hilye-i Sharīf, dated 1209/1795, now at the Turkish and Islamic Arts Museum
- Alif juzu (Arabic alphabet), dated 1213/1798-99 at the Ekrem Hakki Ayverdi Collection
- Dalāil-i Hayrāt now at Istanbul University Library
- Qit'a, dated 1222/1807, now at the Ekrem Hakki Ayverdi Collection
- Qit'a, undated, now at the Saffet Tanman Collection

== See also ==
- Culture of the Ottoman Empire
- Islamic calligraphy
- List of Ottoman calligraphers
- Ottoman art
