= Cao Zhenxiu =

Chinese artist

Cao Zhenxiu (Chinese: 曹贞秀; 1762–?) was a Chinese author, poet, calligrapher, and painter.

She was the daughter of painter Cai Rui. In 1782, she married the official, poet, and calligrapher Wang Qisun. She excelled in many arts. For instance, she was known as the best female calligrapher in China of her time, and it was common for those ordering calligraphy from her spouse to order from her as well. In art, she was especially celebrated for her paintings of plum blossoms. She wrote many poems, particularly in the form of quatrains, written to be accompanied by illustrations.

Much of her work had a particular focus on women, including her great poetic and historical work, which featured 16 poems, each of which described an 'exemplary woman'. Each poem was accompanied by a painting, done by the artist Gai Qi. Although works describing exemplary women were an ancient genre, Cao Zhenxiu was unique in her choices of what qualified a woman as exemplary. Instead of the traditional odes to women who showed chastity and filial piety, Cao Zhenxiu wrote about scholars, artists, calligraphers, poets, and warriors.

== See also ==
- List of Female Calligraphers
