= Hildegarde Kneeland =

American home economist and social statistician

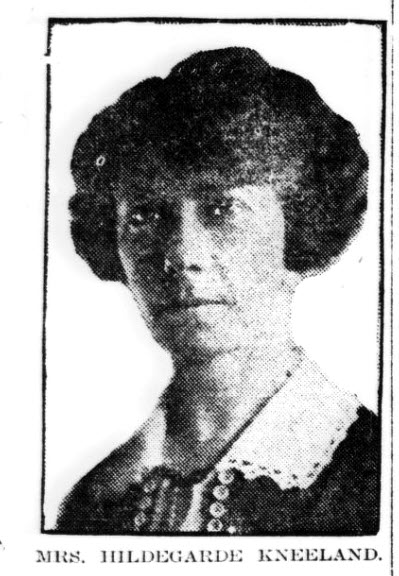
newspaper photo, circa 1926

Hildegarde Kneeland (July 10, 1889 – September 15, 1994) was an American home economist and social statistician, known for her time-use research.

== Education and early career ==
Kneeland was born in Brooklyn, studied at the Packer Collegiate Institute, and graduated from Vassar College in 1911. After graduate study at Teachers College, Columbia University, she taught nutrition at the University of Missouri beginning in 1914. In 1917 she returned to graduate study at the University of Chicago, working there with Hazel Kyrk.

She taught at Barnard College from 1918 to 1919, and at Kansas State Agricultural College from 1919 to 1922. At Kansas State, she headed the department of household economics.

After beginning her government work, she completed a doctorate in 1930 at the Robert Brookings Graduate School of Economics and Government at Washington University in St. Louis.

== Government work ==
The US Bureau of Home Economics was founded in 1923 as part of the United States Department of Agriculture, and Kneeland joined the bureau in 1924. There, she headed its division of economics. Her work there involved analysing household work, expenditures, and consumption, and comparing rural households with the urban middle class. Through time-use research, she showed that homemakers were overworked, and that then-modern home appliances had not significantly reduced the amount of time they spent on housework. She also pushed back against the idea that the scientific management principles of industrial factories were an appropriate way to reduce the inefficiencies of housework.

In 1934 she became implicated in a political scandal when Indiana educator William Wirt attacked the New Deal policies of Franklin D. Roosevelt in a story published by The New York Times. Wirt claimed that insiders within Roosevelt's circle had admitted that the New Deal was designed to fail in order to provide a pretext to crack down on Roosevelt's political enemies and overthrow the government in collusion with the Soviet Union, then led by Joseph Stalin. In Congressional hearings, held in response to these accusations, Wirt stated that he had heard these things from Kneeland at a dinner party. However, Kneeland denied that she had spoken to Wirt on the subject, other witnesses corroborated her story, and the investigating committee concluded that Wirt's claims were "untrue in every sense".

After 1935, she worked for the United States House Committee on Natural Resources. She moved to Palo Alto, California in 1960, where she lived in her retirement.

== Recognition ==
In 1949 Kneeland was elected as a Fellow of the American Statistical Association for being an "outstanding worker in the field of statistics of income distribution".

== Personal life ==
Kneeland never married; in 1938, Time Magazine described her as "a small, hard-working spinster". Alison Laurie argues that Kneeland participated in a trans-Pacific romance with New Zealander Elsie Andrews, whom she met in 1934 at the conference of the Pan-Pacific Women's Association in Honolulu. However, they did not meet again, and although Andrews' later writings attest to a continued attraction to Kneeland, there is little evidence for the same from Kneeland.
