= Winnie Siu Davies =

- Chinese: 蕭愛冰
- Born: British Hong Kong
- Education: University of Hong Kong; Hong Kong Polytechnic University
- Occupation: Artist

Winnie Siu Davies
- Traditional Chinese: 蕭愛冰
Transcriptions
Yue: Cantonese
- Yale Romanization: Sīu Oi bīng
- Jyutping: Siu1 Oi3 bing1

Winnie Siu Davies (Chinese: 蕭愛冰) is a Hong Kong-born artist specialising in sculpture, oil painting, Chinese painting and Chinese calligraphy. She received her BA from the University of Hong Kong, majoring in Fine arts and received an MA in design from Hong Kong Polytechnic University. Later, she moved to Italy to study the art of marble sculpture. Her works have been exhibited locally and internationally in places such as Hong Kong University Museum, Macau, Mainland China, Taiwan, Italy and Canada. At present, she is a founding president of the studio Joy Art Club and President of Hong Kong Oil Painters' Guild (HKOPG) and Founding Chairman of Club 4 Art.

== Education ==
Davies was drawing portraits of people with self-taught skills at the age of four, before she was able to read and write. She received primary art education in traditional Chinese painting and calligraphy from 1976 and she studied fine art after she entered the University of Hong Kong. She started studying the art of sculpting in 1996, and in 2004 she studied marble sculpture in Italy. Training in traditional Chinese art at an early age significantly influenced her art development later on. This led her to take pleasure in linking Chinese art theory into oil painting and sculptures. Her work became a fusion of Chinese and Western concepts.

== Political view ==
Davies has been criticized for the satirical nature of her art about social issues, which could leave some space for public contemplation.

Many of Davies' political artworks, such as "Women Liberation", are mostly related to Hong Kong's political problems.

"One Country, Two System", which sold for US$8,000 at Saatchi in 2010, describes the political situation in Hong Kong. In May 2013, the city had the highest-priced real estate market in the world. A lot of her artwork drew inspiration from the increasing gap between the rich and the poor.

"June 4th" and "1st July – March for Democracy" claim that Hong Kong can still enjoy the freedom of horse racing and dancing after 1997, but people still continue to compensate for the demand for meaningful democracy in these days.

Through these works were reflected different issues, such as social injustice and political incorrectness in Hong Kong.

== Style and technique ==
Davies' works are carried out through three arts: oil painting, sculpture, and Chinese painting. Some also include objects like window frames.

In oil painting, the theme of her work is highly focused on the political situation of her motherland, China and Hong Kong. She uses techniques of contrasting and intensified colours. In her exhibition "Windows", she also applied pointillism in multiple artworks.

In Chinese painting, her works focus on the expression and admiration of nature and Hong Kong. She shows love for natural scenes and animals, especially to tigers. With Chinese painting, she uses saturated colour to intensify the expression of colour contrast.

In sculpture, her works are mainly small-scale wooden sculptures with paint, and small numbers of large metal sculptures. Most of her sculptures are based on the human body. Other themes she uses are Chinese traditions like Kung Fu and Buddhism.

== Career ==
Davies' work was selected by 12th Changchun International Sculpture Symposium in 2011, to be displayed permanently in Changchun World Sculpture Park.

=== Joy Art Club ===
Joy Art Club was set up by Davies in 2006 in Fo Tan as an art gallery for private collectors in Hong Kong. She established this studio for the purpose of people's enjoyment of art and it also provides an art workshop for people to learn.

=== Club 4 Art ===
In 2002, Davies established Club 4 Art in Hong Kong, an educational workshop for children and adults with different nationalities. Courses taught include creative painting, oil painting, Chinese painting, Chinese calligraphy, drawing and sculpture, and lessons in assembling an art portfolio.

== Exhibitions ==
=== Solo exhibitions ===
- Windows – solo exhibition (2010)
- A Refection of Hong Kong Scene (16 – 30 November 2013).
- Feature interview on TVB – Jade programme "Greenroom – 今日VIP" (2013)
- Solo Exhibition of Paintings and Sculptures, Hong Kong Contemporary Art Fair 2014 (17–19 May 2014)
- Solo Exhibition of Paintings and Sculptures by Winnie Davies in Joy Art Club at Fo Tan (7–15 March 2015)

=== Group exhibitions ===
- Six Members' Exhibition – Hong Kong Oil Painters' Guild – Hong Kong City Hall Exhibition Gallery (2—8 March 2007)
- Sculpture Exhibition, 100th Edition of Asian Art News – Hong Kong City Hall (21–30 March 2008). Her calligraphic drawing, "Silent Words" was featured in Asian Art News.
- Sculpture on Hong Kong Sea art event (29 November 2009). The theme of her sculpture on display was "Water to Sea – the Metaphor of Life".
- Hong Kong Young Artists Exhibition, Wan Fung Gallery (20 November – 5 December 2009)
- Hong Kong Oil Painters' Guild Biennial Exhibition
- 12th International Sculpture Symposium, Changchun, China (2011)
- Hong Kong International Sculpture Symposium, Quarry Bay Park (17 December 2012 – 1 January 2013). The theme of the symposium was "change and shift in the wood and environment", to remodel old materials into a new sculpture.
- New Era 2012, Creative Art Village in Shenzhen, China (20 December 2012 – 2 January 2013)
- Exhibition in Central Plaza (2016)
