= Hildegard Mende =

Nazi concentration camp guard (born 1922)

- Born: 24 November 1922; Germany
- Military career
- Allegiance: Nazi Germany
- Branch: Schutzstaffel
- Service years: 1942–1945
- Rank: Aufseherin
- Nickname: The Beast
- Units: Ravensbrück; Theresienstadt

Hildegard Mende (born 24 November 1922) was a female guard (German: Aufseherin) in two concentration camps during World War II. She was employed in Ravensbrück and then in the small fortress of Theresienstadt concentration camp and ghetto in Czechoslovakia. About 88,000 Jews were deported from Theresienstadt; over 33,000 are known to have been murdered or died in the camp itself. She gained the nickname "The Beast" for her alleged sadism.

Her husband was Herbert Mende (1 February 1919 – 1997), a "Polish German, a boxer, a member of the Prague Gestapo, from prison in June 1940 who was appointed guard in Terezin, and was known for his harsh interrogations. On September 24, 1948, he was sentenced in absentia to death. However, he lived in the GDR and with impunity since 1969 in Germany, where he died in 1997. As an overseer, he worked in Theresienstadt with his wife Hildegard, who was allegedly able to kill prisoners with their bare hands."
