= Hildegard Korger =

German calligrapher and scholar

Hildegard Korger (18 June 1935 in Reichenberg, Czechoslovakia – 8 November 2018) was a master calligrapher, scholar and professor at the Hochschule für Grafik und Buchkunst Leipzig.

She is author of the Handbook of Type and Lettering (Schrift und Schreiben) which is considered by many to be one of the most definitive and complete books ever written on the subject of type and lettering arts. It is dedicated to her former teacher, the Leipzig typographer Albert Kapr (1918–1995). She was a member of Association Typographique Internationale.
