= Hildegard Damerius =

German lawyer and politician

Hildegard Damerius (born 29 January 1910 in Duisburg; died 3 May 2006 in Berlin) was a German lawyer and politician of the Socialist Unity Party of Germany (SED) in the German Democratic Republic (GDR). Until 1934, she studied law at the Universities of Leipzig, Heidelberg and Marburg and received her doctorate in 1938, after a legal clerkship in the Saxon Ministry of Justice. As an employee of the Public Prosecutor General of the Federal Court of Justice, she was involved in the Waldheim trials.
