= İsmail Zühdi Efendi =

Ottoman calligrapher

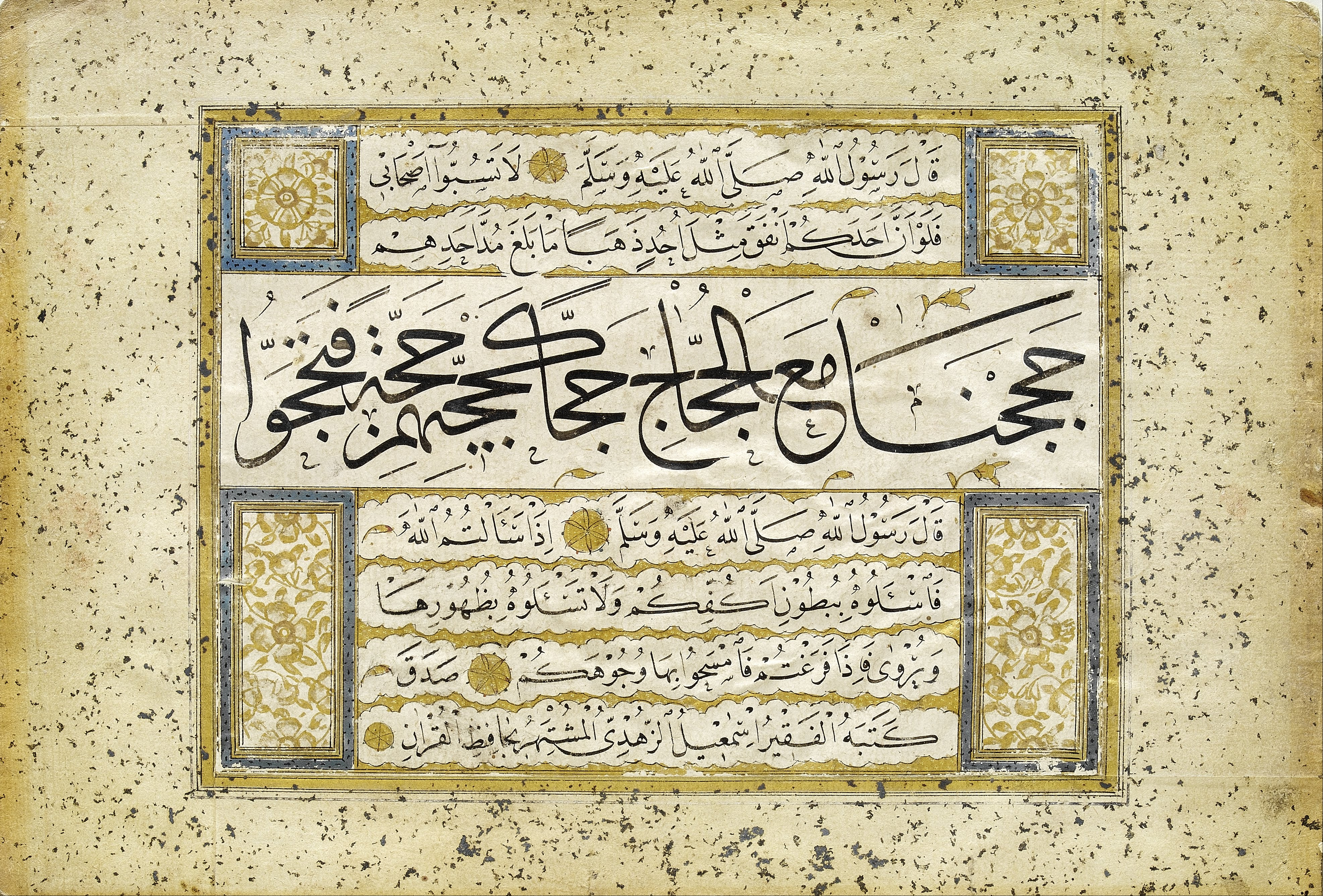
A work by İsmail Zühdi Efendi, now in Sakıp Sabancı Museum

İsmail Zühdi Efendi (Ottoman Turkish: اسماعيل زهدى Modern Turkish: Hattat İsmail Zühdü Efendi, also known as Yeni İsmail Zühdi; died 1806) was an Ottoman calligrapher. “Efendi” is a title of nobility, so this name can also be rendered İsmail Zühdi.

== Life and career ==
İsmail Zühdi was born in Unye on the Black Sea. His father, Mehmed Kaptan, took him to Istanbul at a young age to learn the Qur'an. He is also known as Yeni İsmail Zühdi, or İsmail Zühdi the Second, to distinguish him from another calligrapher by the same name who lived in an earlier period.

İsmail Zühdi had a much younger brother, Mustafa Râkim, who also became a calligrapher. When Mustafa was still quite young, their father took the boy to Istanbul to live with İsmail and study calligraphy with him. By that time, İsmail had been appointed as an instructor of calligraphy at the Imperial Palace, which is where the young Mustafa Râkim received his formal training, studying under his brother.

The two brothers, İsmail Zühdi and Mustafa Râkim, went on to develop their own style of calligraphy based on the work of Hâfiz Osman. They were able to develop a style of celi sülüs. His younger brother, Mustafa Râkim, also perfected the tughra and went on to perfect other scripts, becoming İsmail Zühdi's most celebrated pupil.

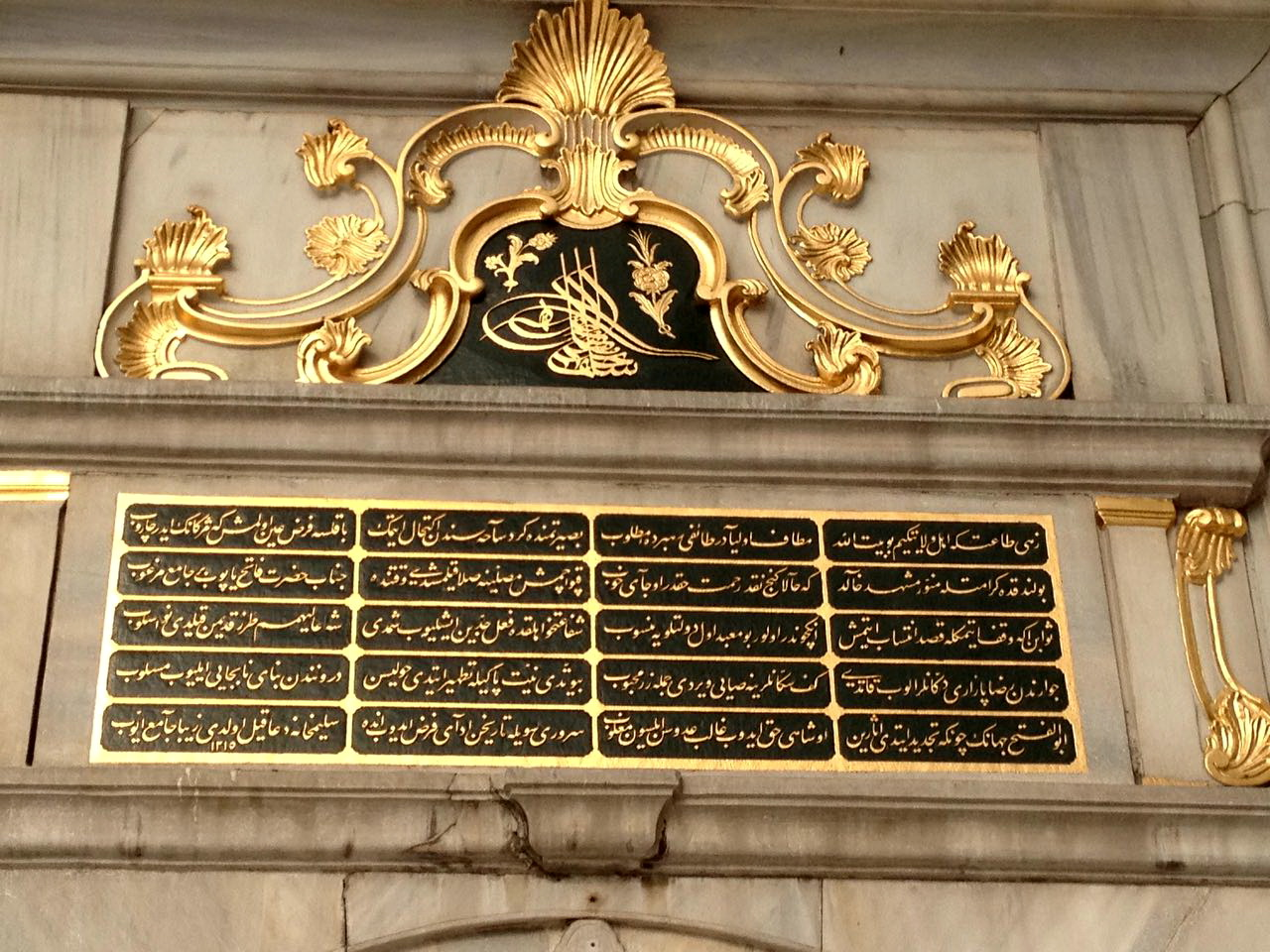
Ottoman calligraphy at Eyüp Sultan Mosque

Some forty Qur’ans copied by him have survived. He also left many writing boards, ki'tas and muraqqas. The inscriptions of the mausoleum of Châh-Sultane at the Deftèrdâr of Eyyoub are by him as is the inscription placed above the door of this same mausoleum is from Mouçtafa 'Izzèt Yasâri. He died in 1806 and was buried outside the gate of Adrianople, at the Edirnekapı Martyr's Cemetery. His brother Mustafa wrote his epitaph. Mustafa postponed his major calligraphic innovations until İsmail died, in deference to seniority.

== See also ==
- Culture of the Ottoman Empire
- Islamic calligraphy
- List of Ottoman calligraphers
- Ottoman art
- Thuluth
