= Maria Strick =

Dutch calligrapher (1577–1631)

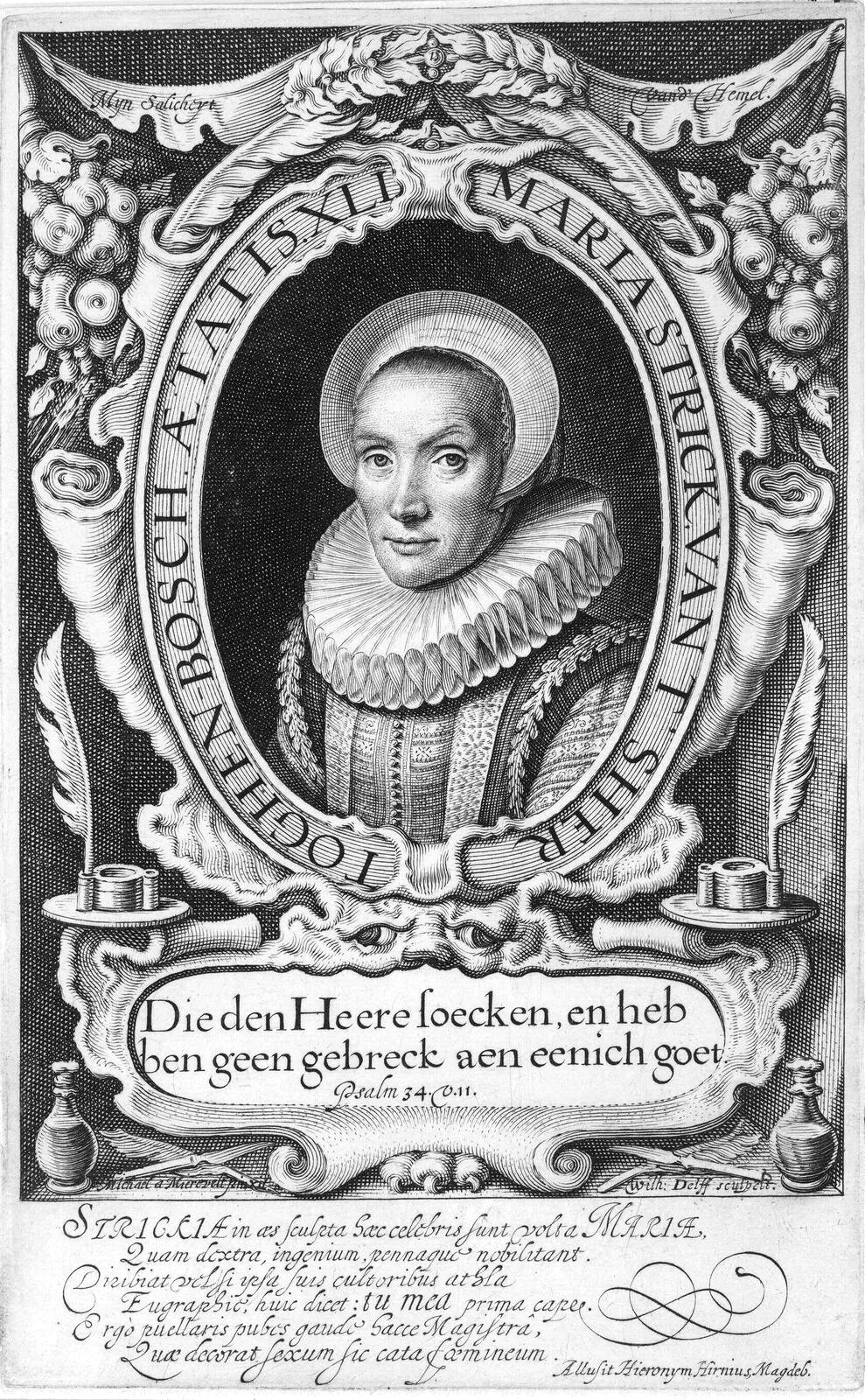
- Maria Strick, by Willem Jacobsz Delff (1618)
- Born: 1577 's-Hertogenbosch
- Died: 1631
- Occupation: calligrapher
- Known for: One of the first woman calligraphers to publish her own copybooks

Maria Strick (née Becq; 1577–after 1631) was a Dutch schoolmistress and calligrapher. She published four writing manuals, making her a key figure in the so-called ‘golden age of Dutch calligraphy’ (c. 1590-1650) and virtually unique among women calligraphers until the twentieth century.

She was born in 's-Hertogenbosch as the daughter of schoolmaster Casper Becq and an anonymous mother. She married the shoemaker Hans Strick in 1598. Her father managed a school in Delft, and Maria would follow in her father's footsteps by taking over the school after his death. In 1615, she moved the school to Rotterdam. Nothing is known about her or her husband after 1631.

Maria Strick probably learned calligraphy from Jan van de Velde the Elder, one of the teachers working at her father’s school. It was to him that Strick dedicated her first writing manual, Tooneel der loflijkcke schrijfpen, which was published around 1607. Strick’s elegant handwriting was skilfully executed in copper print by her husband, who had devoted himself to the art of engraving.

Maria Strick was highly esteemed during her life, being awarded the second prize in the prestigious Plume du couronnée writing contest, held in The Hague in 1620. In particular, her skills in the Italian hand were unequalled. Apart from the four known writing manuals, which established her reputation, she made calligraphic captions for art prints, and several handwritten specimens have survived.

== Works ==
- Tooneel der loflijkcke schrijfpen. Ten dienste van de const-beminnende jeucht, int licht gebracht door Maria Strick. Fransoysche School-houdende binnen de wydt vermaerde stadt Delff. Ghesneden door Hans Strick (Delft 1607).
- Christelycken ABC inhoudende vierentwintich exemplaren van verscheyden geschriften seer bequeaem ende dienstelijkck voor de joncheijdt in de constighe rijmen vervaet. Geschreven en int licht gebracht door Maria Strick Fransoysche School houdende binnen de wydt vermaerde stadt Delff. Gesneden door Hans Strick (1611).
- Schat oft voorbeelt ende verthooninge van verscheyden geschriften ten dienste vande liefhebbers der hooch-loflycker konste der penne. Mitsgaders de fondamenten der selve schrifte. Int licht gebracht door Marie Strick Fransoische-school houdende binnen de wijt vernaemde koopstadt Rotterdam. Gesneden door Hans Strick (1618).
- Fonteyne des levens dat is schoone troostelijcke Biblissche spreuchen voor aengevochten ende bedroefde herten na d'ordre van t' A.B.C.: mede seer nut ende bequaem voor alle beminders der pennen. Int licht gebracht door Maria Strick Francoysche schole houdende tot Rotterdam. Hans Strick sculp. (1624).
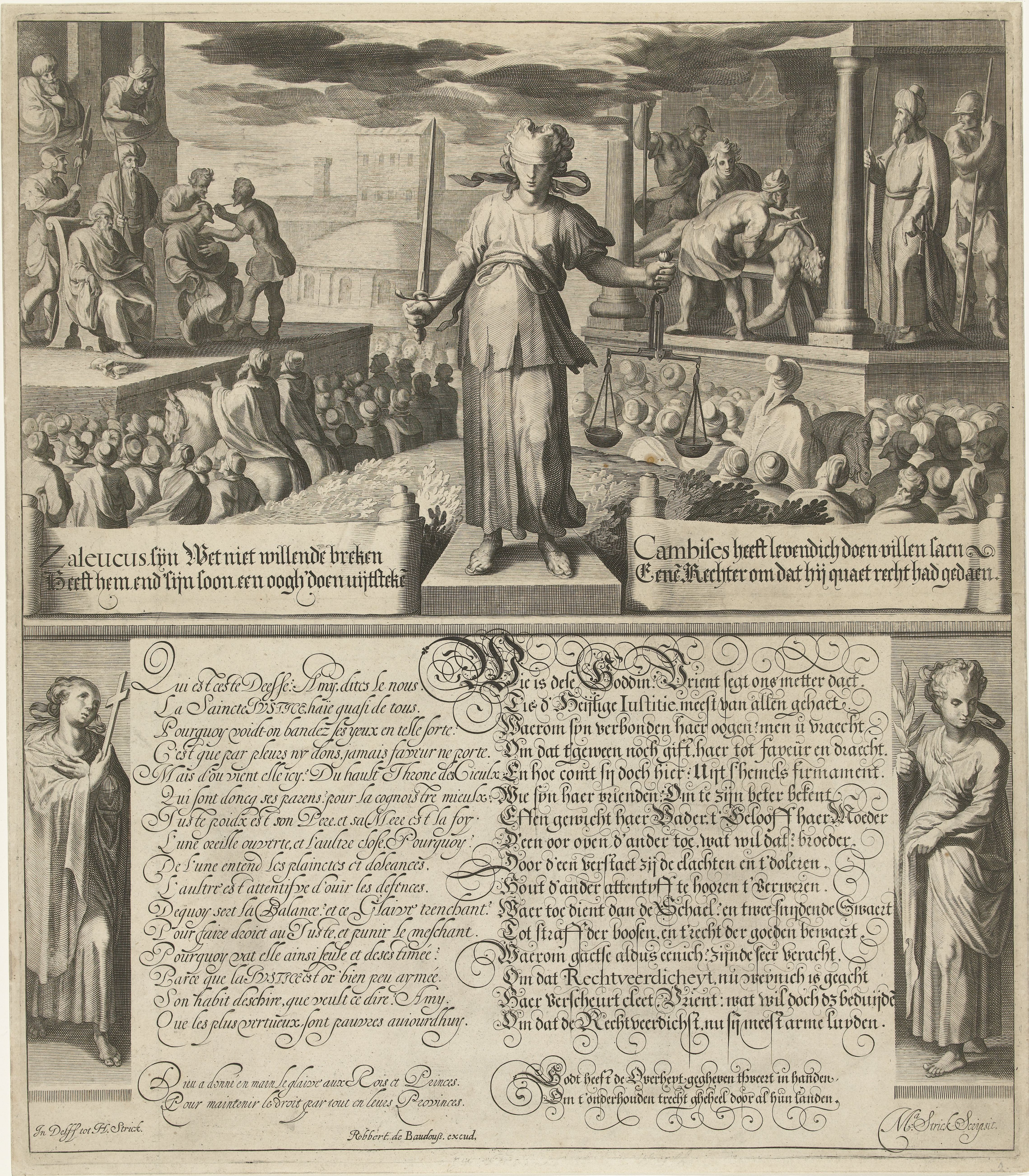
Vrouwe Justitia voor het oordeel van Zaleucus en het oordeel van Cambyses, Willem Jacobsz, scripit. Maria Strick-Becq, Delff, 1618 (RIJKS Museum)

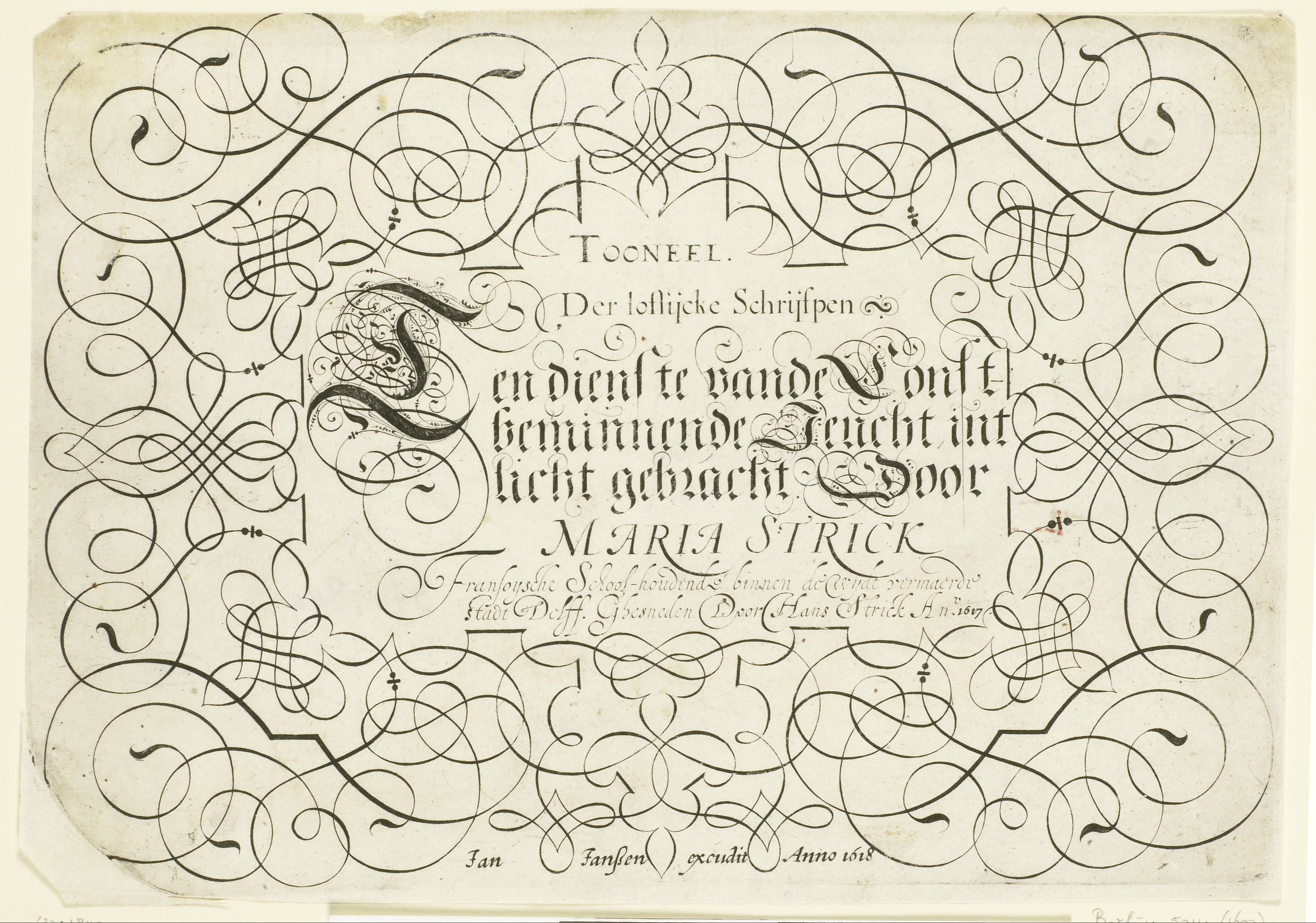
Title page of Strick's Tooneel Der loflijcke Schrijfpen (1607)

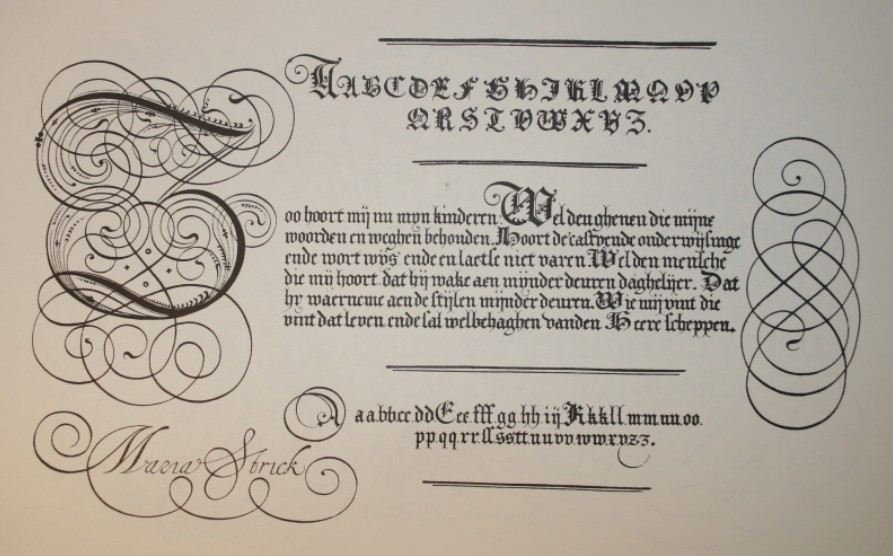
Maria Strick, calligraphy example, 1618

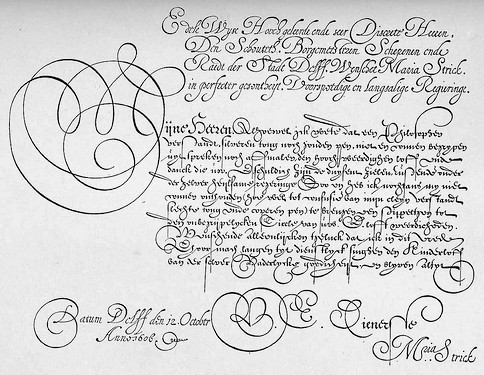
Maria Strick, calligraphy example, 1620
