= Hildegard Wortmann =

German business executive (born 1966)

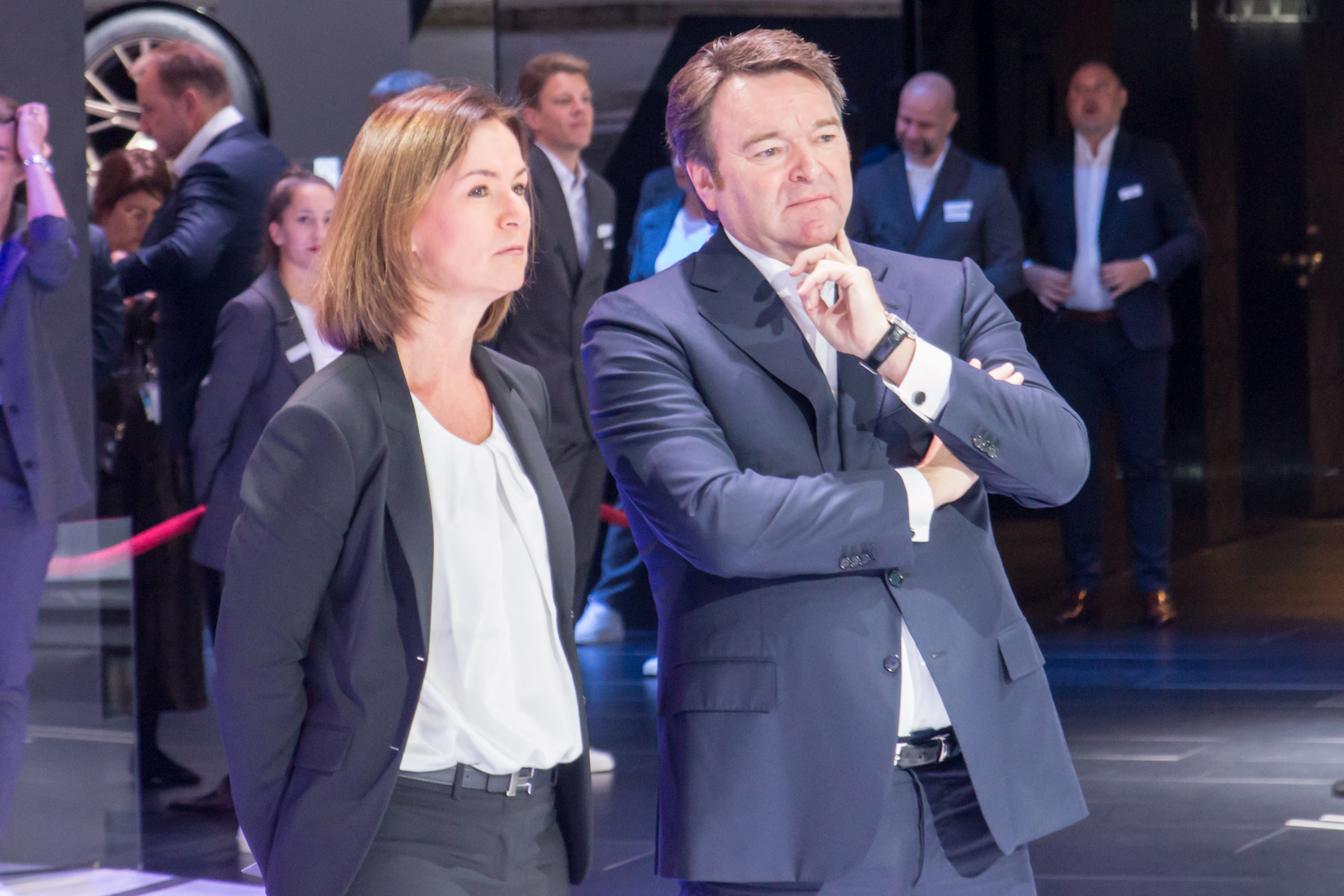
- Wortmann (left) with Bram Schot at the IAA 2019
- Born: 27 September 1966 (age 59); Münster, North Rhine-Westphalia, West Germany
- Occupation: Business executive

Hildegard Wortmann (born 27 September 1966) is a German business executive. Appointed to the Board of Management of Audi on 1 July 2019, where she is responsible for marketing and sales, she was the first female member of that body.

== Early life and education ==
Wortmann, who graduated from high school in 1985, is a state-certified foreign language correspondent and studied business administration at FH Münster until 1989 and later supplemented her studies with a Master of Business Administration at the University of London.

== Career ==
Wortmann started her career at Unilever in 1990 There, she worked in various positions, including product and brand manager, and later as marketing director for Calvin Klein.

In October 1998, Wortmann switched to BMW. There, she worked in various roles. She was involved in the relaunch of the Mini brand, was responsible for product management of the BMW X and BMW Z models and was entrusted with building up the electric vehicle sub-brand BMW i. Until 2016, she was responsible for the management of the BMW brand. From the beginning of 2018 to mid-2019, she headed the "Asia-Pacific" sales region of BMW AG before she was appointed to the Board of Management for Marketing and Sales at Audi AG as the successor of Bram Schot.

== Other activities ==
- Ferrovial, Independent Member of the Board of Directors (since 2021)
