= Carola =

- Gender: Female

Origin
- Origin: The Latinized form of Germanic names, coming from Charles or Karl.
- Meaning: free woman

Other names
- Related names: Charlize, Carla, Karla, Karolina, Karoline, Caroline, Charlotte, Carolien, Karoliina, Carole, Charline, Carolin, Karola

Carola is a female given name, the Latinized form of the Germanic given names Caroline or Carol.

Notable people named Carola include:

== Acting ==
- Carola Baleztena (born 1980), Spanish actress
- Carola Braunbock (1924–1978), Czech-born East German actress
- Carola Höhn (1910–2005), German actress
- Carola Lotti (1910–1990), Italian actress
- Carola Neher (1900–1942), German actress
- Carola Reyna (born 1962), Argentine actress and director
- Carola Scarpa (1971–2011), Brazilian actress and socialite
- Carola Toelle (1893–1958), German actress
- Thekla Carola Wied (born 1944), German actress

== Music ==
- Carola Bauckholt (born 1959), German composer
- Carola Grey (born 1968), German jazz drummer and composer
- Carola Grindea (1914–2009), Romanian pianist and piano teacher
- Carola Häggkvist (born 1966), also known as just Carola, Swedish singer, winner of the 1991 Eurovision Song Contest
- Carola Kinasha (born 1962), Tanzanian musician
- Carola Moccia (born 1991), known as La Niña, Italian singer-songwriter and actress
- Carola Nossek (born 1949), German operatic soprano and voice teacher
- Carola Smit (born 1963), Dutch singer
- Carola Standertskjöld (1941–1997), Finnish jazz and pop singer

== Sports ==
- Carola Anding (born 1960), East German cross-country skier
- Carola Bott (born 1984), German badminton player
- Carola Calello (born 1977), Argentine alpine skier
- Carola Casale (born 1998), Italian karateka
- Carola Cicconetti (born 1962), Italian fencer
- Carola Ciszewski (born 1968), German handball player
- Carola Dombeck (born 1960), German gymnast
- Carola Fasel (born 1997), Swiss footballer
- Carola Hoffmann (born 1962), German field hockey player
- Carola Hornig (born 1962), German rower
- Carola Lichey (born 1961), East German rower
- Carola López (born 1982), Argentine taekwondo practitioner
- Carola Mangiarotti (born 1952), Italian fencer
- Carola Nitschke (born 1962), East German swimmer
- Pier Carola Pagani (born 1963), Italian racewalker
- Carola Paul (born 1960s), East German figure skater
- Carola Salvatella (born 1994), Spanish field hockey player
- Carola Schneider (born 1993), Danish footballer
- Carola Söberg (born 1982), Swedish football coach and former goalkeeper
- Carola Uilenhoed (born 1984), Dutch judoka
- Carola Weißenberg (born 1962), German figure skater
- Carola Wolff, West German figure skater
- Carola Zirzow (born 1954), East German sprint canoer

== Politics ==
- Carola, wife of Obelerio degli Antenori (fl. 804–811), dogaressa of Venice
- Carola Bluhm (born 1962), German politician
- Carolina "Carola" Correa Londoño (1905–1986), wife of President of Colombia Gustavo Rojas Pinilla
- Carola Rackete (born 1988), German ship captain, sea rescuer and politician
- Carola Reimann (born 1967), German politician
- Carola Schouten (born 1977), Dutch politician
- Carola Stabe (born 1955), East German dissident and civil rights activist
- Carola of Vasa (1833–1907), Queen of Saxony
- Carola Veit (born 1973), German lawyer and politician

== Others ==
- Carola Baer-von Mathes (1857–1940), German landscape painter
- Carola Cobo (1909–2003), Bolivian artist and cookbook author
- Carola "Ola" Cohn (1892–1964), Australian artist, author and philanthropist
- Leah Carola Czollek (born 1954), German author, mediator and trainer
- Carola Dibbell (born 1945), American music journalist and author
- Carola Doerr (born 1984), German computer scientist
- Carola Dunn (born 1946), British-American writer
- Carola Durán (born 1987), Dominican model
- Carola B. Eisenberg (1917–2021), Argentine-American psychiatrist
- Jeanne Carola Francesconi (1903–1995), Italian chef and cookbook author
- Carola Frege (born 1965), German scholar in international and comparative employment relations
- Carola Garcia de Vinuesa (born 1969), Spanish doctor, scientist and professor
- Carola Giedion-Welcker (1893–1979), German-Swiss art historian
- Carola Goya (1906–1994), American dancer, choreographer and teacher
- Carola Gruber (born 1983), German author
- Carola Hansson (born 1942), Swedish novelist, dramatist and translator
- Carola Helbing-Erben, German artist
- Carola Hicks (1941–2010), British art historian
- Carola Insolera (born 1985), Norwegian model
- Carola Lentz (born 1954), German social anthropologist
- Carola Lorenzini (1889–1941), Argentine aviator
- Carola Macaulay (1682–?), Scottish milliner and trader
- Carola Matthiesen (1925–2015), German educator, librarian, writer and poet
- Carola Ivena Meikle (1900–1970), English algologist
- Carola Miró (1965–2024), Spanish Catalan teacher
- Carola Oman (1897–1978), English historical novelist, biographer and children's writer
- Carola Pavlik (born 1978), Dutch contemporary artist
- Carola Prosperi (1883–1981), Italian writer, feminist and journalist
- Carola Richards (1916–2004), English artist
- Carola Roloff (born 1959), German Tibetologist, scholar of Buddhism and Buddhist nun
- Carola Saavedra (born 1973) is a Chilean-Brazilian writer
- Carola Gräfin von Schmettow (born 1964), German businesswoman
- Carola-Bibiane Schönlieb (born 1979), Austrian mathematician
- Carola Stern (1925–2006), German journalist, author and television presenter
- Carola Suárez-Orozco, Swiss-American cultural developmental psychologist, academic and author
- Carola Susani (born 1965), Italian author
- Carola Trier (1913–2000) was a German dancer, acrobat, contortionist and teacher
- Carola Unterberger-Probst (born 1978), Austrian filmmaker and artist
- Carola Wenk (born 1973), German-American computer scientist
- Carola von der Weth (born 1959), German chess champion
- Carola Woerishoffer (1885–1911), American labor activist and settlement worker

== See also ==
- Carl (name)
- Carol (disambiguation)
- Carolan (surname)
- Caroly (name)
- Karola
