= Franceschi =

Franceschi is a surname. Notable people with the surname include:

- Paolo Franceschi (c.1540-1596), also known as Paolo Fiammingo, Flemish painter, lived in Venice
- Piero della Francesca (c. 1420–1492), also called Piero de' Franceschi, Italian painter
- Francesco Franceschi (died c. 1599), engraver and patriarch of the Franceschi printing family
- Vittore de Franceschi, Italian Roman Catholic Bishop of Famagusta
- Alberto Franceschi (born 1947), Venezuelan politician and businessman
- Antonia Franceschi (born 1960), American actress and choreographer
- Carlo de Franceschi (1809–1893), Italian historian
- Claude Franceschi (born 1942), French angiologist
- Ernesto Franceschi (1912–1943), Italian bobsledder
- Francesco de' Franceschi (fl. 1443–1468), Italian Renaissance painter
- Francesco Franceschi (horticulturist) (1843–1924), Italian horticulturist
- François Franceschi-Losio (1770–1810), Italo-French general
- Giovanni Franceschi (born 1963), Italian medley swimmer
- Giovanni Franceschi (born 1963), Italian swimmer and medalist
- Giulia Civita Franceschi (1870–1957), Italian educator
- Jean Baptiste Marie Franceschi-Delonne (1767–1810), French general and noble
- Jean Baptiste, baron Franceschi (1766–1813), French general
- Jean-Louis Franceschi (born 1947), Général of the French Army and Commandant of the French Foreign Legion
- Josh Franceschi (born 1990), frontman of You Me at Six
- Juan "Papo" Franceschi (c. 1946 – 20 October 1990), Puerto Rican track and field athlete
- Michel Vergé-Franceschi (born 1951), French naval historian
- Patrice Franceschi (born 1954), French pilot who flew an ultralight around the world
- Pete Franceschi (1919–1989), American football player
- Raffaele Franceschi (born 1960), Italian swimmer and medalist
- Sara Franceschi (born 1999), Italian swimmer
- Vera Franceschi (1926–1966), Italian American pianist
- Molini Franceschi, a municipality in Croatia in the Split-Dalmatia County

== See also ==
- Franceschini
- Francesconi
- Franceschetti
