= Myrta Fisher =

British artist

- Born: 1917; Wimbledon, London, England
- Died: 1999 (aged 81–82)
- Education: Huddersfield Art School; Slade School of Fine Art
- Known for: Oil painting

Myrta Fisher (1917–1999) was a British artist known for her oil and acrylic paintings.

== Biography ==
Fisher was born in the Wimbledon area of London and, between 1935 and 1937, attended the Huddersfield Art School before returning to London to study at the Slade School of Fine Art until 1940. In 1954 and 1955 Fisher spent a year at the British School at Athens after which she combined a series of teaching posts, both full and part-time, with her art career. She exhibited, both in group shows and as a solo artist, with the Artists' International Association and with the Eastbourne Group. With commercial galleries Fisher had shows at the Ansdell Gallery in London in 1971 and at Rottingdean and Newhaven. The Towner Gallery in Eastbourne holds examples of her work.
