= Francesconi =

Francesconi is an Italian surname. Notable people with the surname include:

- Claudio Francesconi (born 1945), former Italian fencer
- Enzo Francesconi (born c. 1923), Italian professional rugby league footballer
- Fulvio Francesconi (born 1944), Italian professional football player
- Gianluca Francesconi (born 1971), Italian professional football player
- Ginevra Francesconi (born 2003), Italian actress and model
- Jeanne Carola Francesconi (1903–1995), Italian chef and cookbook author
- Jim Francesconi (born 1953), politician and attorney in Portland, Oregon
- Judy Francesconi (born 1957), US-American photographer with lesbian women as main subject
- Luca Francesconi (born 1956), Italian composer
- Ludovica Francesconi (born 1999), Italian actress

== See also ==
- Franceschi
