= Pietro Aquila =

Italian painter (1630–1692)

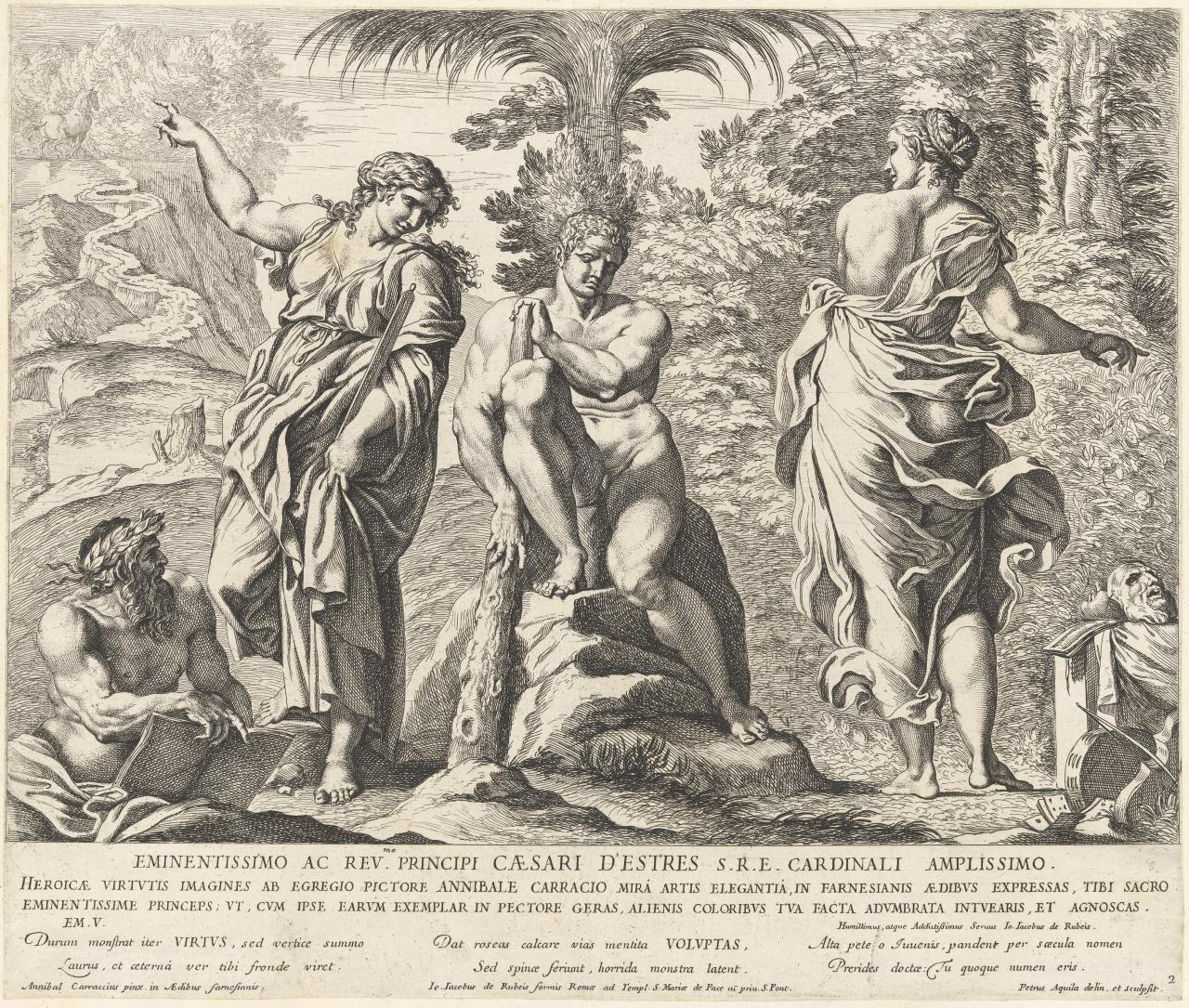
Hercules at crossroad, fresco by Annibale Carracci at the Palazzo Farnese, Rome, engraving done by Pietro Aquila.

Pietro Aquila (c. 1630–1692) was an Italian painter and printmaker of the Baroque period. He was born in Palermo. He mentored his nephew, the printmaker Francesco Faraone Aquila.

== Biography ==
He trained at the school of Palermo painter and engraver Pietro del Po and worked, like a teacher, first at home, in Palermo, then in Naples and Rome, where he pursued the ecclesiastical career. For his paintings that he left in Palermo in the church of the Pietà (Parabola del Figlio Prodigo, Abraham and Melchizede) and in the cloister of S. Maria delle Vergini (S. Benedetto), as well as some frescoes in the Chapel of the Rosary in S. Cita, he gained the status of "respectable painter", loyal to the Raphaelesque tradition.

But Aquila established himself first and foremost as a copper engraver, dedicating himself to the distribution and popularization of many of the most remarkable paintings with the help of which the sacred and profane buildings of Rome were adorned at that time. He made engravings after the works of different artists that were dear to him including: Raphael before any other, and then Annibale Carracci, Pietro da Cortona, Giovanni Lanfranco, Lazzaro Baldi, Ciro Ferri, Morandi, Franceschini, and finally Carlo Maratta, who was bound to him by a close friendship.

His most important effort is represented by the reproduction of Carracci paintings in Palazzo Farnese published in two series by Gian Giacomo De Rossi at Pace. Another important work of Aquila was the reproduction, in collaboration with Cesare Fantetti, of the "Raphael Bible" in the Vatican (Imagines Veteris ac Novi Testamenti). He continued to demonstrate his inventive qualities with some engravings drawn by his own hand, such as an Adoration of the Magi, a Venus, the Escape to Egypt in two versions, a Holy Family, a Head of a man signed "Pietro Aquila Inventor et fecit ".

He died in Alcamo in 1692.

He had his own pupil, Francesco Faraone Aquila, who followed his footsteps, dedicating himself especially to the antique press, to the service of Domenico De Rossi, successor of G. Giacomo.
