= Helbing =

Surname of notable people in various fields

Helbing is a surname. Notable people with the surname include:

- Carola Helbing-Erben (born 1952), German artist
- Dirk Helbing (born 1965), German scientist
- Ferenc Helbing (1870–1958), Hungarian graphic artist and painter
- Karl-Heinz Helbing (born 1957), German sport wrestler
