= LSD in Czechoslovakia =

The Czechoslovak Socialist Republic between 1956 and 1990

Between the 1950s and 1970s, the hallucinogenic drug LSD was extensively studied in the Czechoslovak Socialist Republic, with experiments conducted for both military applications and government-approved psychiatric treatments. Following the expiration of Sandoz’s patents on LSD in 1963, state-owned pharmaceutical company Spofa began manufacturing the compound domestically from 1963 to 1974. In 1965, the authorities approved the commercial production of a local version of LSD under the trademark "Lysergamid," which was also exported to several Western countries. During the years of legality, one of the world's largest clinical LSD programs was conducted in Prague, involving over 700 psychiatric patients and volunteers in more than 6,000 therapeutic sessions.

On October 24, 1968, the possession of LSD was made illegal in the United States, and in 1971, the drug was listed as a Schedule I substance by the United Nations under the Convention on Psychotropic Substances, deeming it to have no therapeutic value. Although the Czechoslovak government did not initially sign the UN convention, it halted LSD production and discontinued clinical use by 1974 due to fears of youth addiction during the period of Normalization. In theory, the drug could still be requested with Health Ministry approval, but in practice, this rarely occurred due to widespread reluctance.

== Background ==
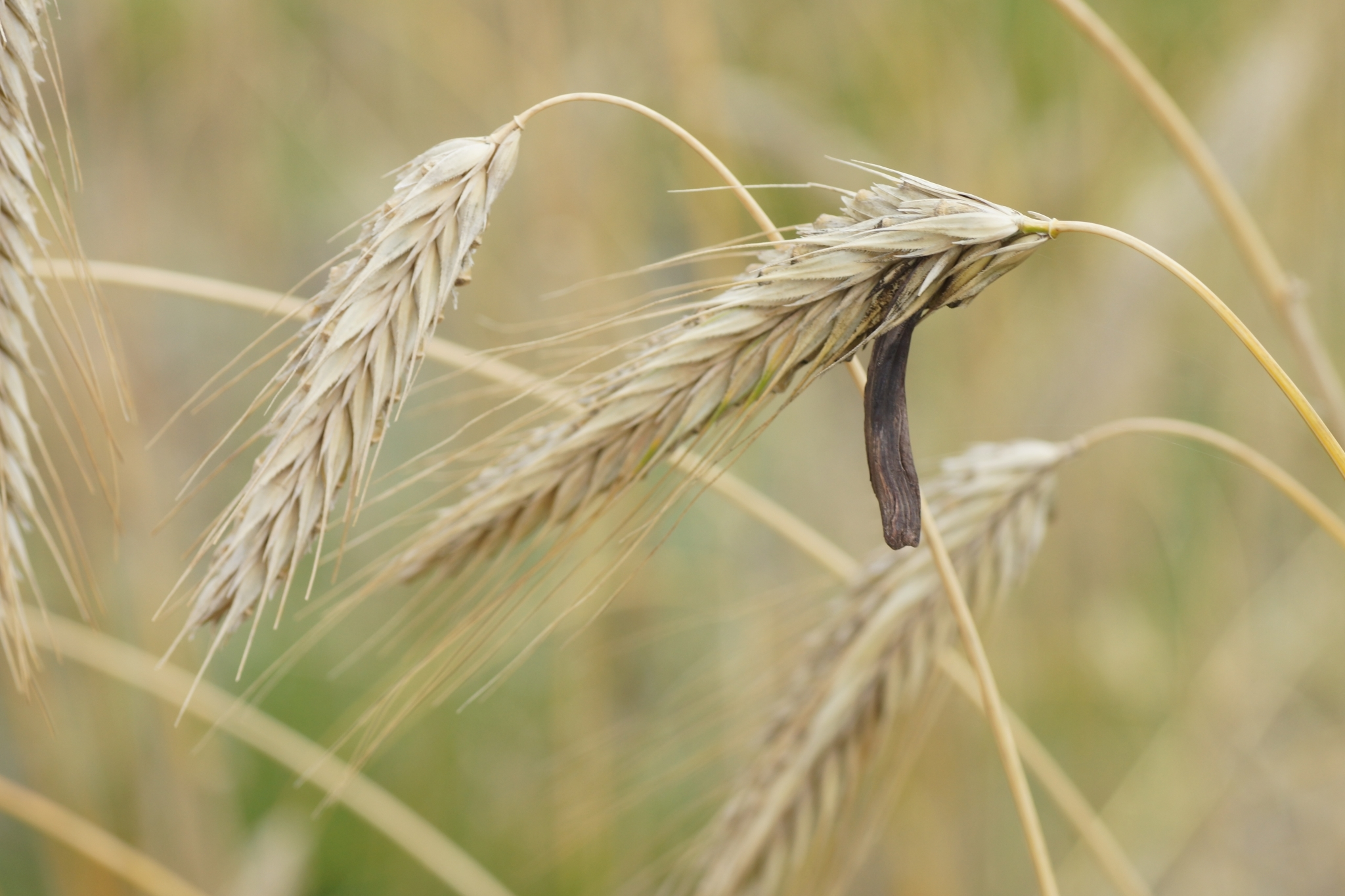
The hallucinogenic compound is derived from the ergot fungus

Swiss chemist Albert Hofmann first synthesized LSD in 1938, but only discovered its potent psychedelic properties after accidentally ingesting it in 1943. During the 1950s and 1960s, the substance attracted widespread scientific interest for its potential use in psychiatry. By the mid-1960s, recreational LSD had become a symbol of the youth counterculture movement, deeply influencing music, art, and social activism under the broader phenomenon of psychedelia.

Czechoslovakia emerged as a center for psychedelic research behind the Iron Curtain, especially from the 1950s through the 1970s. Among the leading researchers was Stanislav Grof, who conducted clinical studies at the Psychiatric Research Institute in Prague. There, he led a program systematically exploring the heuristic and therapeutic potential of LSD and other psychedelic substances.

== History ==
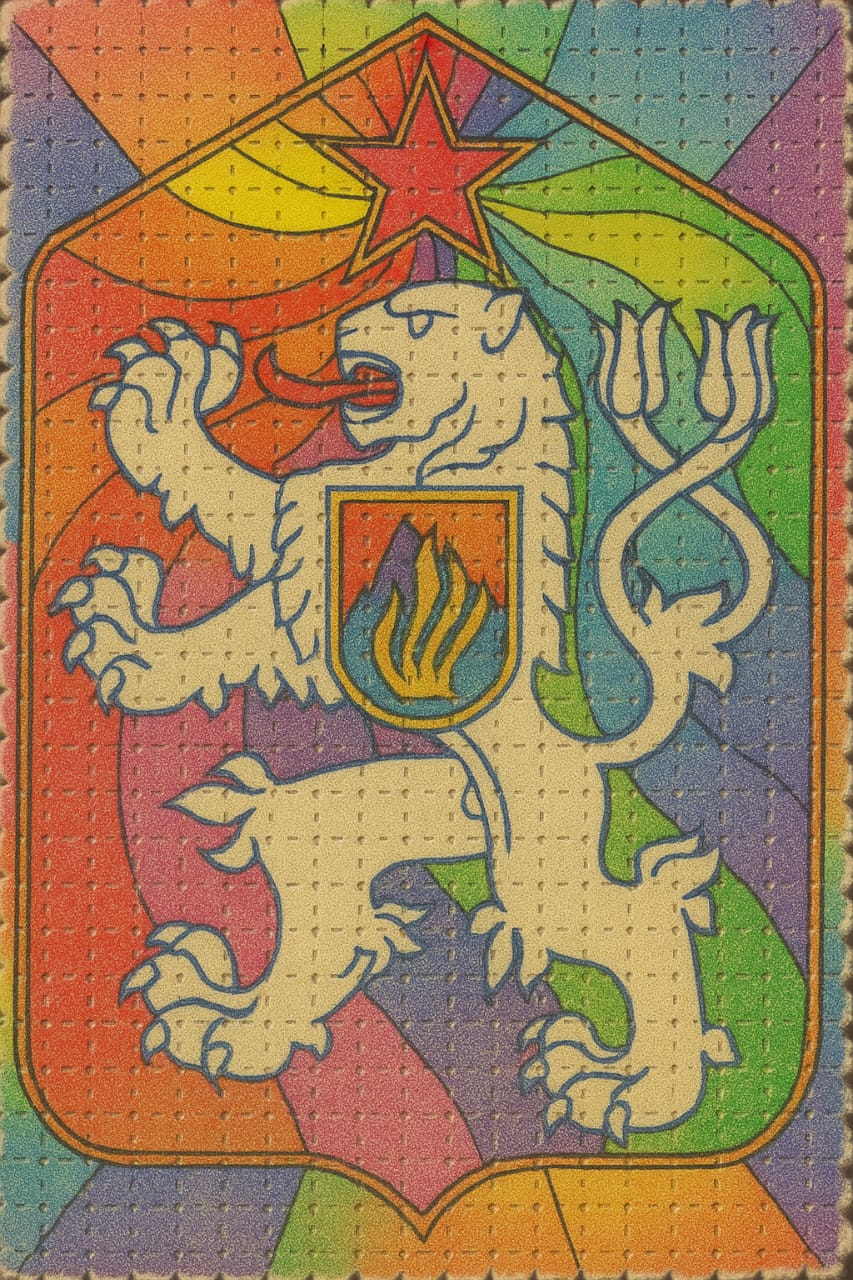
A blotter art depicting the coat of arms of the Czechoslovak Socialist Republic

LSD research in Czechoslovakia began in 1953, led by volunteer psychiatrists and psychologists aiming to understand psychotic states and explore therapeutic applications. In 1961, scientists at the Institute for Pharmacy and Biochemistry successfully synthesized LSD domestically. After Sandoz's patents expired in 1963, full-scale industrial production began in 1965 at the Galena plant in Opava, with the compound marketed as "Lysergamid Spofa" by the Spofa state pharmaceutical company. In the first decade alone, millions of LSD doses were produced and distributed for free to psychiatric hospitals and clinics across the country. Thousands of individuals participated in psychedelic sessions during this period, including prominent artists such as Ivo Medek and Jiří Anderle, as well as young intellectuals, musicians, singers, and university students. Rumors suggest that Miloš Zeman, who later became president of the Czech Republic, may have been among the participants. Years later, popular singer Karel Gott also acknowledged undergoing LSD-assisted therapy.

In his book LSD: My Problem Child, Albert Hofmann described Prague as a hub for acquiring quality LSD:

LSD also brought me into contact with a variety of individuals from the drug scene and hippie circles, many of whom I will briefly mention here. Most were young Americans, en route to the Far East in search of Eastern wisdom or a guru, or in hopes of finding drugs more easily. Sometimes, Prague itself was the destination, as high-quality LSD was easily obtainable there at the time.

— Albert Hofmann

LSD was primarily used in psychiatry to induce altered states of consciousness analogous to psychosis, enabling psychiatrists to better understand the perceptual and cognitive distortions experienced by severely mentally ill patients. Participants included healthcare professionals, students, artists, and inpatients, especially in trials conducted in the town of Sadská. In total, around 700 patients and volunteers took part in more than 6,000 sessions. Regulated use of the compound continued until 1974, when it was officially banned, later than in most Western nations, which had outlawed it in the 1960s.

One of the most controversial aspects of Czechoslovakia's LSD story was its international export. These operations were often conducted under the supervision of the Czechoslovak secret police, the State Security (StB). Records from the Slovak National Crime Agency show that the drug was exported to countries such as the United Kingdom, where the StB operated a branch office of the Chemapol company named Exico, and to the United States using ordinary envelopes to conceal the contents. No longer constrained by Sandoz's patents, Czech authorities produced LSD in 1 mg vials for small orders and 100 mg powder ampoules for bulk shipments.
