= Jhikoman =

Tanzanian reggae artist

- Also known as: Jhiko Manyika
- Born: Jhikolabwino Siza Manyika; 1972 (age 53–54); Dar Es Salaam, Tanzania
- Genres: Afro-acoustic; Afro-Reggae; World: East Africa
- Occupations: Music Artist; painter; sculptor; farmer
- Instruments: Vocals; guitar
- Years active: 1994–present
- Label: Afrikabisa Records

Jhikoman, (born as Jhikolabwino Siza Manyika in 1972) also known as Jhiko Manyika is a Tanzanian reggae artist. He has served as an active musician since 1994 and toured extensively in both Europe and Africa. He combines acoustic reggae with African music. Jhikoman sings in English, Swahili, and mother tongue Kinyasa.

His music provides him a voice to raise awareness about social oppression and injustice. He uses it as a medium for communicating messages of peace, love and unity.

== Early life ==
Jhikoman was born in 1972 in Dar es Salaam, Tanzania. He is the third child in the family. He has 8 other siblings, 5 brothers and 3 sisters. In addition to music, Jhikoman works as a painter, cartoonist, sculptor and a farmer. He currently resides in Bagamoyo, Tanzania.

== Professional involvements ==
He is the lead singer of the Afrikabisa Band, since 2000. He is the vocal coach for his record label AfrikaBisa Records. In 2012, he joined as a vocal advisor at the Bagamoyo Institute of Art and Culture and TaSUBa.

He has produced several albums and performed widely in Europe and Africa such as Mela in Oslo, Norway, World Village festival / Maalma Kylassa in Helsinki, Finland; Exeter Respect Festival in Exeter, Devon, UK and locally at ZIFF- Zanzibar International Film Festival, and Sauti za Busara in Zanzibar as well as Bagamoyo International Art Festival etc.

== Personal life ==
He has three children – two daughters, Chimwemwe and Ntendele, and a son, Tayamika.

== Discography ==
His music can be found on CDBaby, iTunes and Amazon.

=== Albums ===
==== Chikondi ====
Jhikoman published album Chikondi in 2007 through Afrikabisa Records. Chikondi is Nyasan language and means divine, unconditional and sacrificial love. The disc was recorded at the Green Dragon studio in Oslo, Norway, and Zamunda studio in Dar es Salaam, Tanzania. The album attracted a number of international artists, such as Baran M. Kurdistan, Khalid Salih from Sudan; Uriel Seri Côte d'Ivoire; Thorbjørn Holte Geir Inge Storli, Henrik Johnsen and Jacob, Norway; OnRebel G, Mexico; Carola Kinasha, Tanzania; Chai Jaba, Congo; as well as Sister Yana, Brazil.

==== Tupendane ====
Jhikoman released Tupendane in 2008 through Afrikabisa Records. The album yielded Micho Dread and it was recorded StudioRed studio in Helsinki, Finland. The songs of this album are in Swahili, a language widely spoken through East Africa.

==== Yapo ====
In 2009, Yapo was released through the UduMood Music. The album was produced by well-known Finnish musician and producer Samuli "power" Majamäki. The disc was recorded in Bagamoyo, Tanzania, UduMood studio in Finland and Alcalassa Spain.

==== Moyo Unadunda ====
In 2012, Moyo Unadunda was released. The album is a collaboration between Jhikoman and Afrikabisa Band.

| Release year | Album name | Genre |
|---|---|---|
| 2007 | Chikondi | World: East Africa |
| 2008 | Tupendane | Reggae: Roots Reggae |
| 2009 | Yapo | World: East Africa |
| 2012 | Moyo Unadunda | Reggae: Roots Reggae |

=== Singles ===
| Release year | Song title | Genre |
|---|---|---|
| 2010 | Selina | Reggae: Roots Reggae |
| 2011 | Bongoraggamuffin | World: Afro-Beat |
| 2013 | Bagamoyo (feat. FidQ & Mzungu Kichaa) | World: East Africa |
| 2015 | Afrika Arise (Jhikoman and Peetah Morgan) | |
