= Frege (surname) =

Frege is a surname. Notable people with the surname include:

- Andreas Frege, German-British punk rock singer
- Carola Frege (born 1965), German scholar
- Élodie Frégé, French singer and actress
- Gottlob Frege (1848 –1925), a German philosopher, logician, and mathematician
- Livia Frege (1818–1891), German soprano
