= Pavlíkov =

- Market town
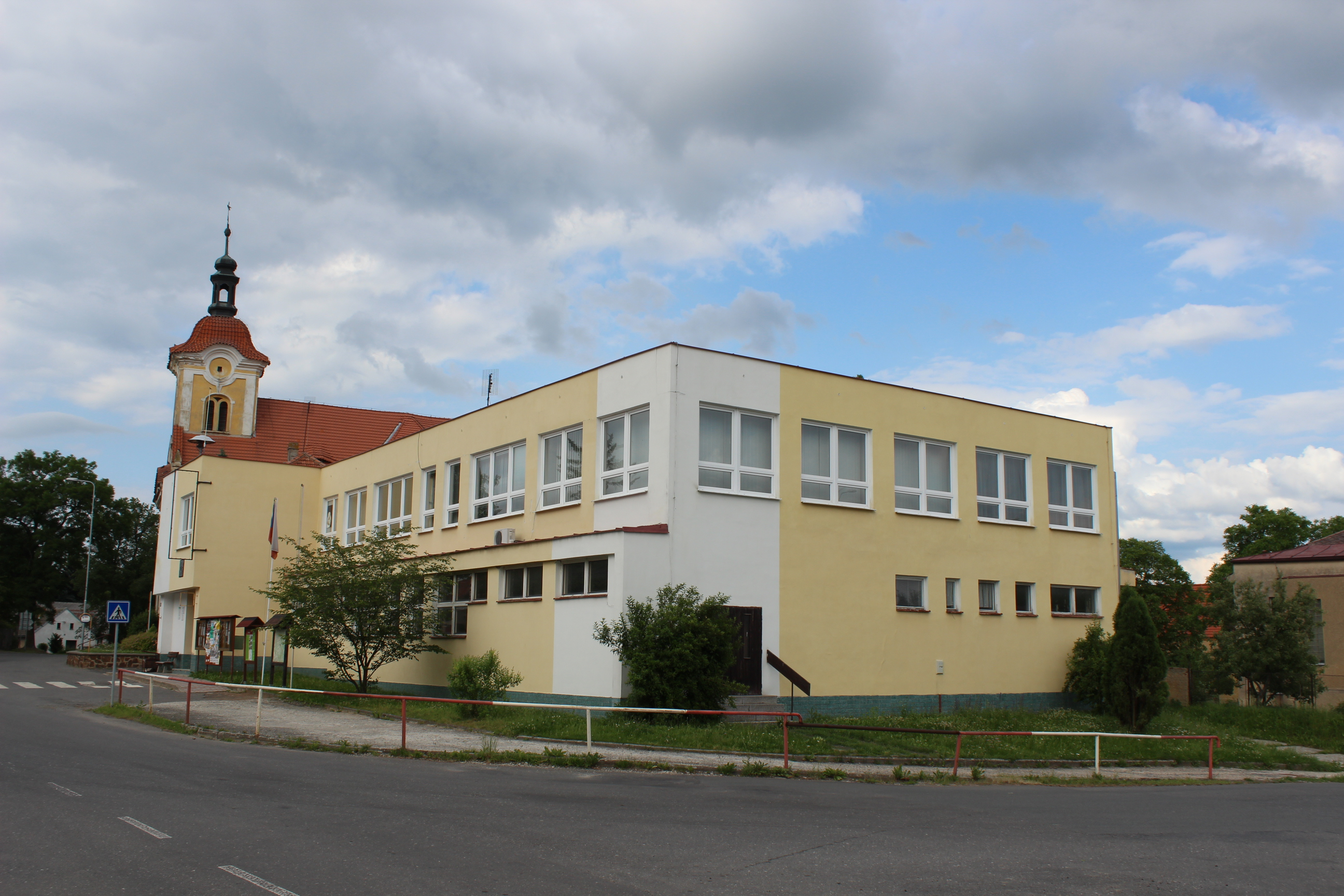
- Municipal office

- Flag Coat of arms

- Location in the Czech Republic
- Coordinates: 50°3′22″N 13°44′11″E
- Country: Czech Republic
- Region: Central Bohemian
- District: Rakovník
- First mentioned: 1422

Area
  - Total: 39.46 km^{2} (15.24 sq mi)
- Elevation: 462 m (1,516 ft)

Population (2026-01-01)
  - Total: 1,071
  - Density: 27.14/km^{2} (70.30/sq mi)
- Time zone: UTC+1 (CET)
  - Summer (DST): UTC+2 (CEST)
- Postal code: 270 21
- Website: www.pavlikov.cz

Pavlíkov (Czech pronunciation: [ˈpavliːkof]) is a market town in Rakovník District in the Central Bohemian Region of the Czech Republic. It has about 1,100 inhabitants.

== Administrative division ==
Pavlíkov consists of five municipal parts (in brackets population according to the 2021 census):

- Pavlíkov (691)
- Chlum (137)
- Ryšín (57)
- Skřivaň (131)
- Tytry (50)

== Etymology ==
The name is derived from the personal name Pavlík, meaning "Pavlík's (court)".

== Geography ==
Pavlíkov is located about 5 kilometres (3 mi) south of Rakovník and 41 km (25 mi) west of Prague. It lies mostly in the Plasy Uplands, only the northern part of the municipal territory extends into the Křivoklát Highlands. The highest point is the hill Senecká hora at 506 m (1,660 ft) above sea level. The stream Rakovnický potok flows through the territory. The northern and southern parts of the territory lie within the Křivoklátsko Protected Landscape Area.

== History ==
The first written mention of Pavlíkov is from 1422. The settlement was founded around 1341.

In 2007, Pavlíkov was promoted to a market town.

== Demographics ==
Historical population

Year	Pop.	±%
1869	1,790	—
1880	1,873	+4.6%
1890	1,890	+0.9%
1900	1,816	−3.9%
1910	1,869	+2.9%

Year	Pop.	±%
1921	1,918	+2.6%
1930	1,770	−7.7%
1950	1,445	−18.4%
1961	1,343	−7.1%
1970	1,167	−13.1%

Year	Pop.	±%
1980	1,097	−6.0%
1991	989	−9.8%
2001	1,007	+1.8%
2011	1,050	+4.3%
2021	1,066	+1.5%

Source: Censuses

== Transport ==
The village of Chlum is located on the Beroun–Rakovník railway line.

== Sights ==
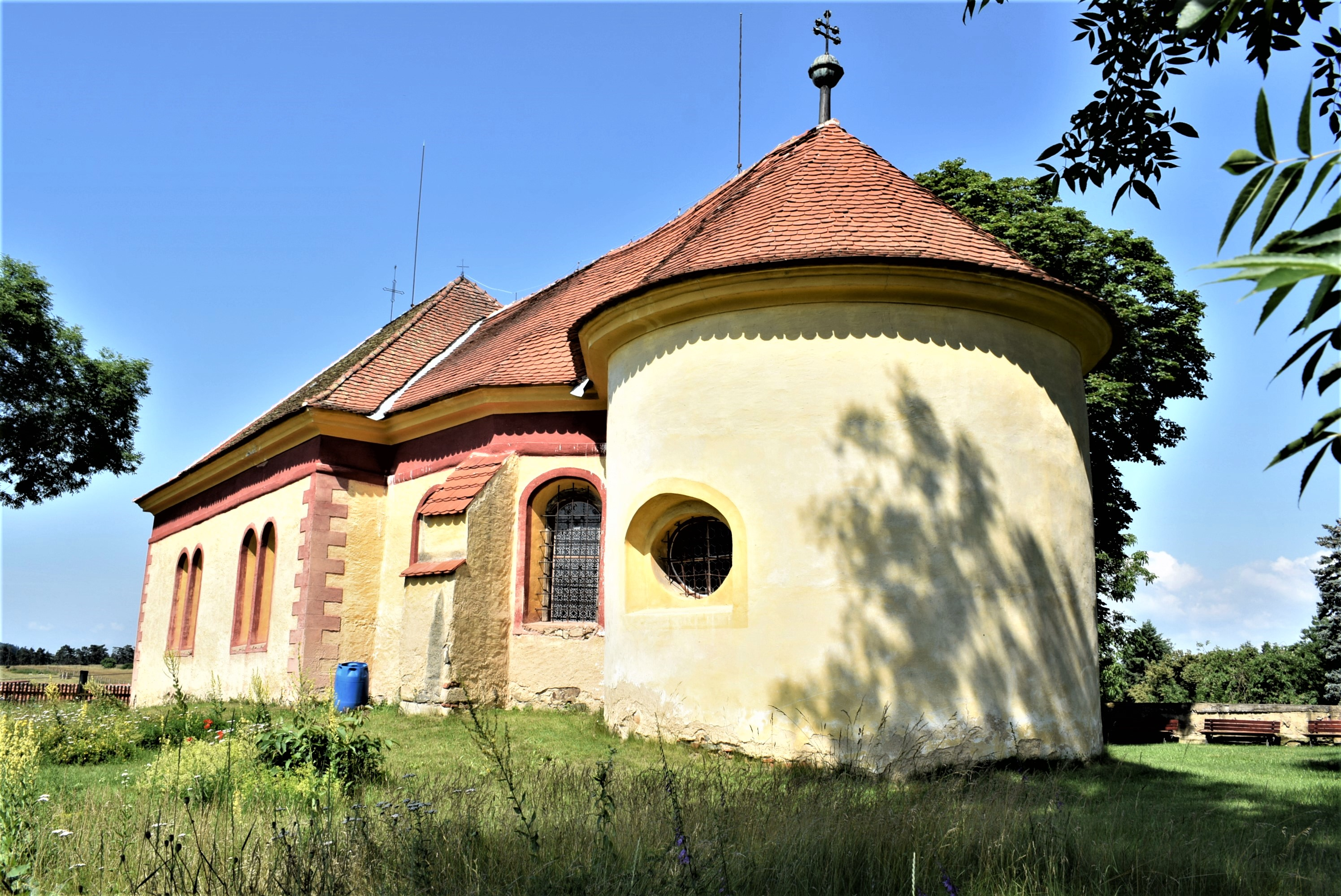
Church of Saint Stephan

The main landmark of Pavlíkov is the Church of Saint Catherine. It was built in the late Baroque style in 1776–1785. It replaced an old church from the 14th century.

The Church of Saint Stephan is located in Skřivaň. It is a late Renaissance building, modified into its current appearance in the first half of the 19th century.

Next to this church is a small rural Renaissance castle, which was founded in the second half of the 16th century. Neoclassical modifications took place in the first half of the 19th century, then it was insensitively modernised in the 20th century.

On the hill Senecká hora above the market town is an observation tower. It was built in 2014–2015 and is 21.5 m (71 ft) high.

== Notable people ==
- Jiří Čadek (1935–2021), footballer
- Jiří Anderle (born 1936), painter and graphic artist
