= Eastbourne Group =

The Eastbourne Group of Contemporary Artists is an artists' exhibiting society based in Eastbourne, Sussex for professional and semi-professional artists.

== History ==
The group was founded in 1913 as the Eastbourne Society of Artists, changing to the Eastbourne Group in 1968 and The Eastbourne Group of Contemporary Artists in 2003. The first chairman of the group was Arthur Reeve-Fowkes A.R.C.A (1881-1965), who was also the Towner Art Gallery's first curator.

== Notable Past Members ==
- Arthur Reeve-Fowkes, A.R.C.A (1881-1965)
- Bertram Nicholls, P.R.B.A (1883-1974)
- Leslie Charlotte Benenson, R.E. (b. 1941)
- Helen Moggridge, F.F.P.S
- Dino (Leopoldo) Mazzoli
- Carola Richards (1916-2004)
- June Hainault
