= Pavlík =

Pavlík (feminine: Pavlíková) is a Czech and Slovak surname, a diminutive of the name Pavel. Notable people with the surname include:

- Carola Pavlik (born 1978), Dutch contemporary artist
- Eva Pavlíková (born 1960), Slovak actress
- Gorazd Pavlík (1879–1942), bishop and saint
- John Leon Pavlik aka Johnny Powers (musician) (1938–2023), American singer
- John V. Pavlik, American academic and author
- Jozef Pavlík (born 1973), Slovak footballer
- Karel Pavlík (1900–1943), Czech military leader
- Kelly Pavlik (born 1982), American boxer
- Milada Pavlíková (1895–1985), Czech architect
- Petr Pavlík (footballer, born 1978), Czech footballer
- Petr Pavlík (footballer born 1987), Czech footballer
- Radovan Pavlík (born 1998), Czech ice hockey player
- Roger Pavlik (born 1967), American baseball player

== See also ==
- Richard Paul Pavlick (1887–1975), American unsuccessful assassin
- Pavlik Morozov (1918–1932), murdered Russian child used in Soviet propaganda
