= Jiří Čadek =

Czech footballer (1935–2021)

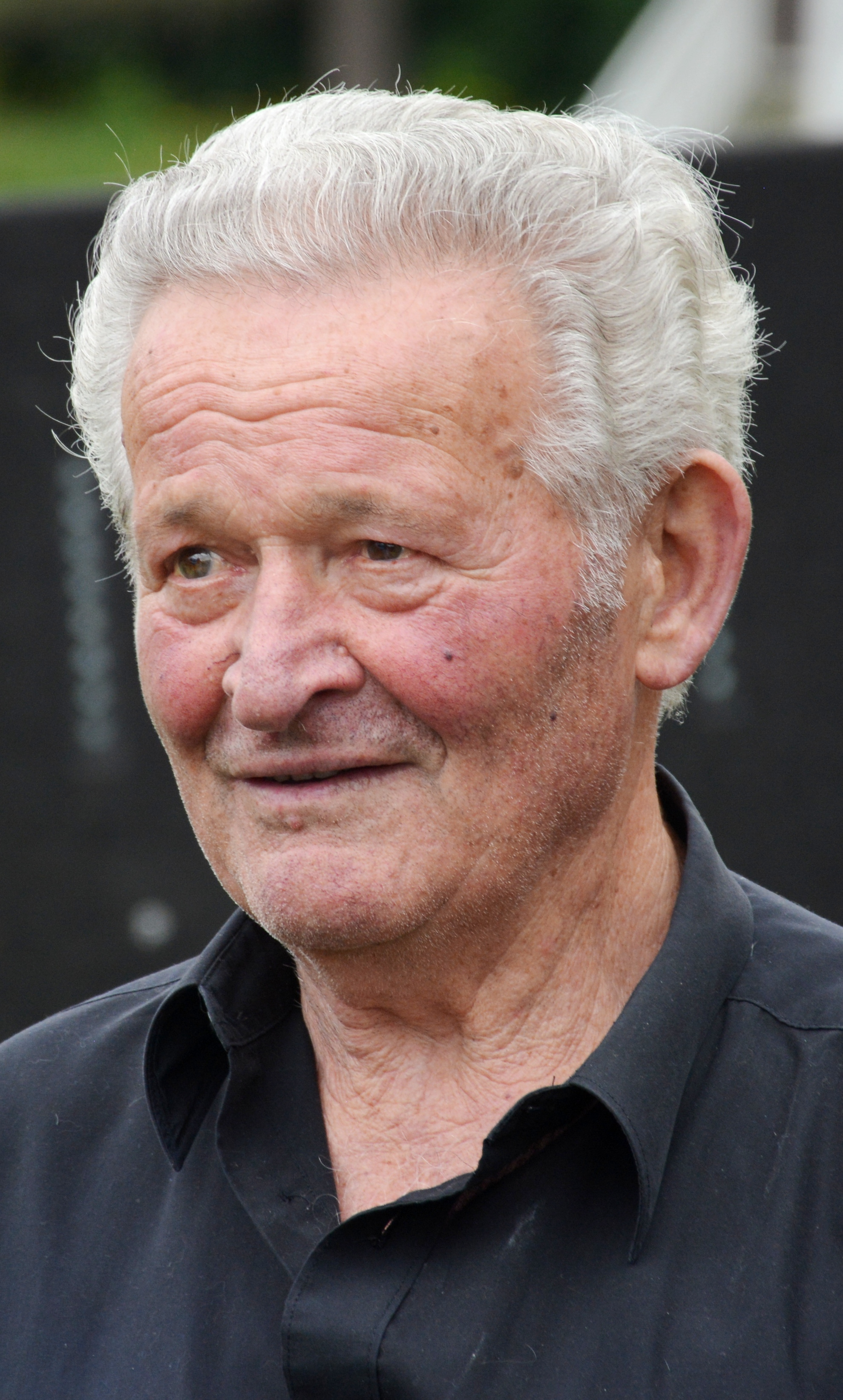
- Čadek in 2015

Personal information
- Date of birth: 7 December 1935
- Place of birth: Pavlíkov, Czechoslovakia
- Date of death: 20 December 2021 (aged 86)
- Position: Defender

Youth career
- –1950: Sokol Pavlíkov
- 1950–1951: Spartak Strakonice

Senior career*
Years	Team	Apps	(Gls)
1952–1954	Avia Čakovice		
1954–1971	Dukla Prague	331	(0)

International career
1957–1958	Czechoslovakia	3	(0)
- * Club domestic league appearances and goals

Jiří Čadek (7 December 1935 – 20 December 2021) was a Czech footballer who played as a defender.

Čadek played his whole professional career for Dukla Prague. He appeared in 328 league matches, though he never scored a league goal. During his career at Dukla, Čadek won the Czechoslovak First League seven times and the Czechoslovak Cup three times.

Čadek was a member of the Czechoslovakia national team and played at the 1958 FIFA World Cup in Sweden, where he appeared in the match against Northern Ireland.

He died on 20 December 2021, at the age of 86.
