= Carola Gruber =

German author

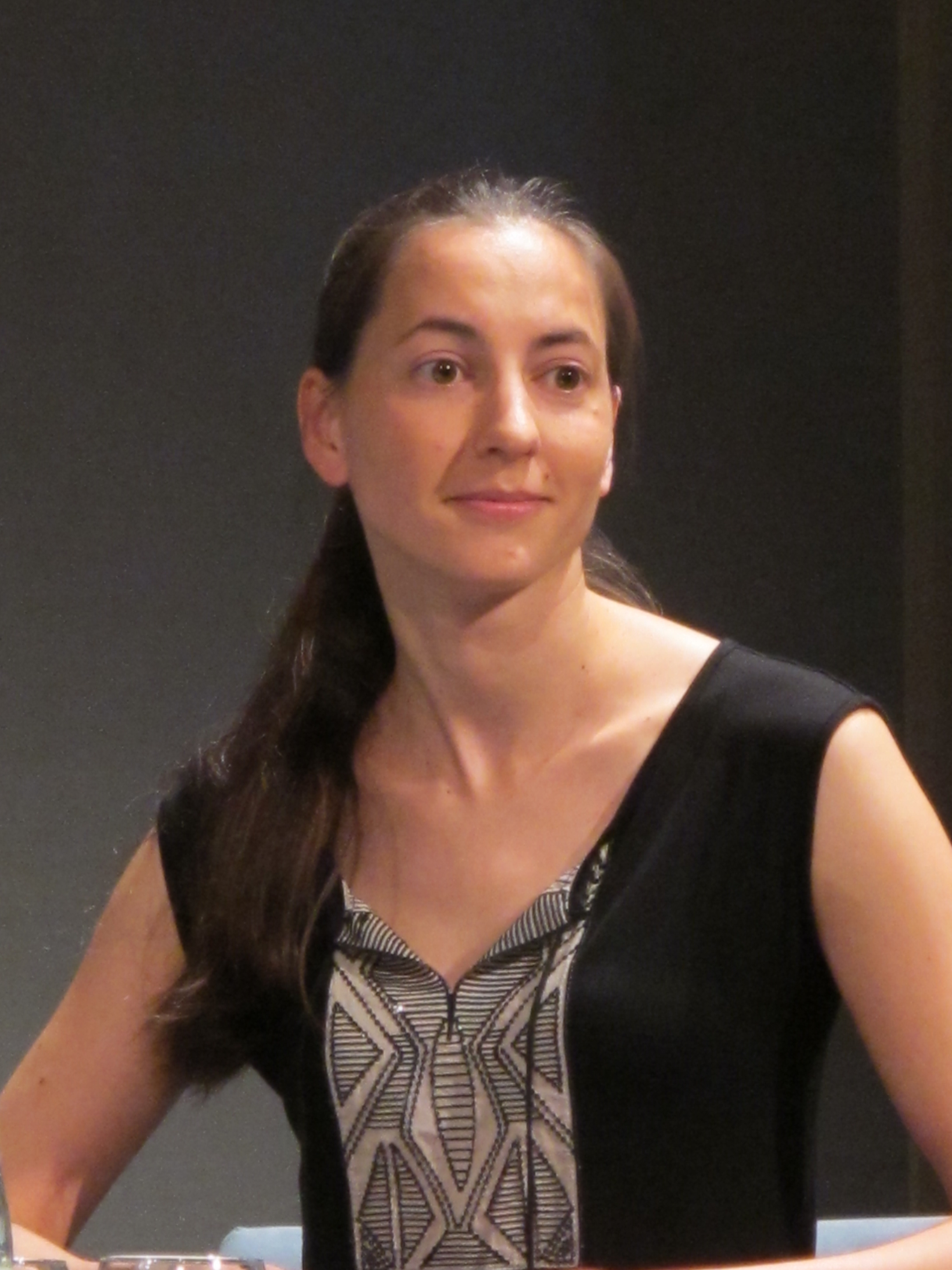
Carola Gruber in 2016

Carola Gruber (born 1983 in Bonn) is a German author.

== Life ==
Carola Gruber studied Creative Writing and Cultural Journalism, as well as Comparative literature, in Hildesheim, Berlin, and Montreal. She earned her doctorate in Literary Studies at LMU Munich. Gruber received several awards supporting emerging authors and was a finalist for the Floriana Literature Prize. In addition to her individual publications, she has contributed to various literary magazines, including Am Erker, Außer.dem, lit, and poet. She lives in Munich, where she also teaches courses in creative writing.

== Individual publications ==
- Everything in its place, Poetenladen Publishing, Leipzig, 2008
- Stoffelhoppel's Downfall, Edition Ranis, Ranis, 2012
- Events in Brief: Narratological Investigations into the Eventfulness of Extreme Prose by Thomas Bernhard, Ror Wolf, and Helmut Heißenbüttel, Transcript Publishing, Bielefeld, 2013

== Awards and honors ==
- 2011/2012: City Writer of Ranis
- 2012: City Writer of Schwaz
- 2015: City Writer of Rottweil
- 2016: Literary Scholarship of the Free State of Bavaria for the novel project Alles über Zebras
- 2018: Würth-Literaturpreis Prize for the text Schon gut
- 2018: Literaturpreis Prenzlauer Berg Prize (3rd place) for the text Sportsfreundin
- 2018: erostepost Literature Prize
- 2021: Writer in Residence (City Writer) in Gelsenkirchen
