= Carola Scarpa =

Brazilian actress and socialite

Carola Scarpa (August 24, 1971, São Paulo – February 25, 2011), born Ana Carolina Rorato de Oliveira in São Paulo, was a Brazilian actress and socialite.

She was married to Brazilian playboy Chiquinho Scarpa. She lived in the U.S. and had an affair with the mobster John A. Gotti in New York City.
