= Carola Lorenzini =

Argentinian aviator

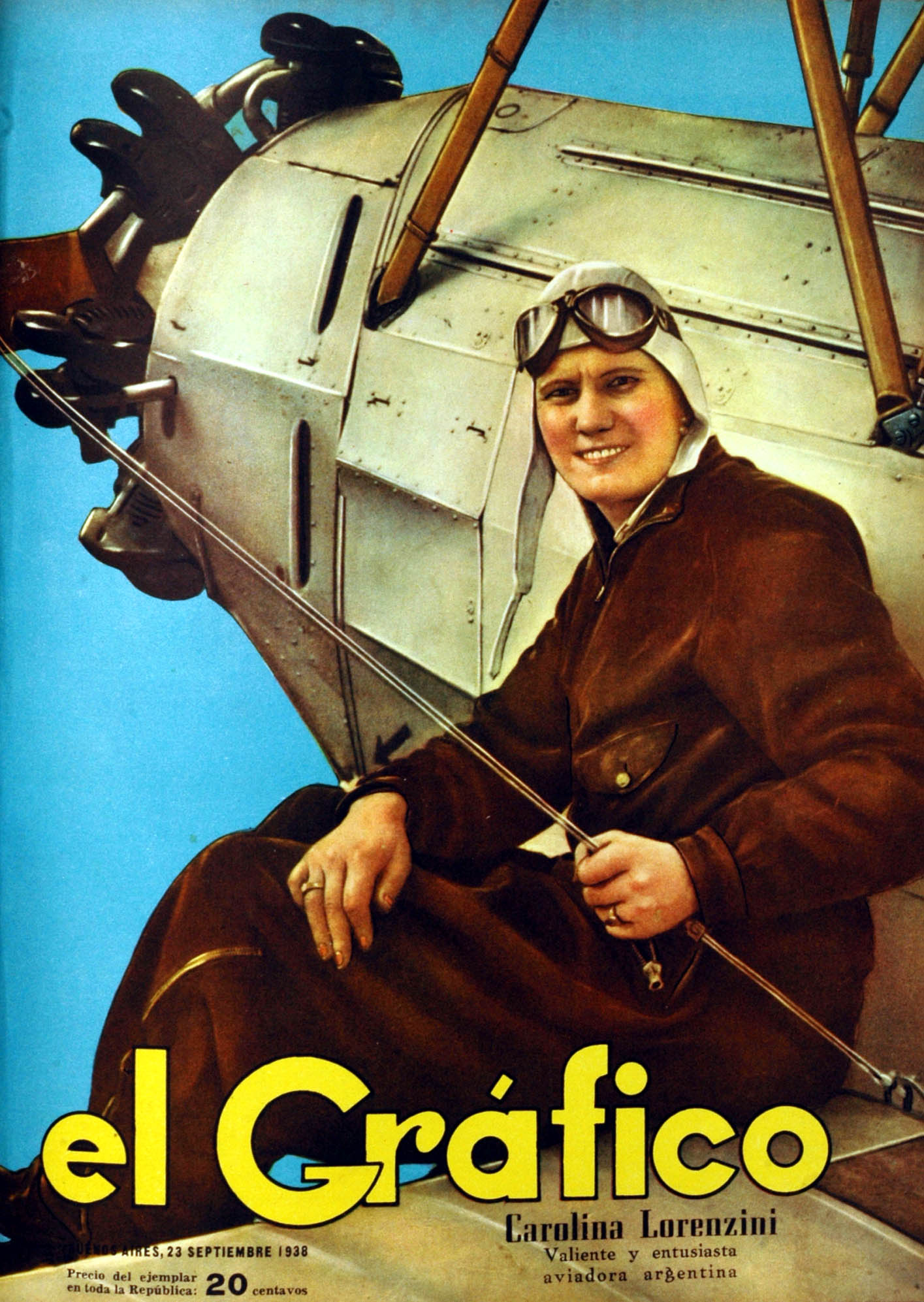
- Lorenzini on the cover of magazine El Gráfico (September 1938)

Carolina (Carola) Elena Lorenzini (15 August 1889 – 23 November 1941) was a pioneer Argentine aviator.

== Life ==
Lorenzini was born in Buenos Aires, Argentina, the seventh of eight children. She worked as a typist at the Unión Telefónica Company, and enjoyed participating in sports such as rowing, javelin, athletics and hockey. In 1933 she started learning to fly at the Aeroclub de Morón. The lessons were expensive, and she had to use all her savings, and sell her bicycle and encyclopedia, to pay. In March 1935 she earned her pilot's license. The same year, she broke the South American record for altitude, flying to 5,700 metres. She also entered and won several flying races, and became interested in high aerobatics, enrolling in a course on the subject. She became famous for her skill in performing inverted loops, an advanced maneouvre which only one other aviator, her instructor Santiago Germanó, was able to perform.

From 1938 to 1940, Lorenzini was involved in an air exploration mission to fly across all 14 of Argentina's provinces and make aerial maps for transport and mail flights. She flew to every town and city in the country, annotating maps as she travelled. As a result, she became nationally famous; in 1939 the magazine Vosotras named Lorenzini one of Argentina's eight women of the year, and in 1940 she featured on the cover of El Grafico magazine.

== Death ==
On 23 November 1941 Lorenzini lost control of her aircraft, a Focke-Wulf, while conducting her famous inverted loop, and crashed. She died immediately. The accident happened in Morón during an aerobatics exhibition for a visiting group of Uruguayan aviators at the Presidente Rivadavia airfield in Seis de Septiembre, now Morón Military Air Base. It was later reported that Lorenzini had been flying an aircraft she was unfamiliar with and that she had been extremely angry on the day of the exhibition due to an ongoing issue with the organisers of the event.

In 2001, the Argentine post office issued a postage stamp bearing Lorenzini's image and name.
