= Carola Baer-von Mathes =

German painter

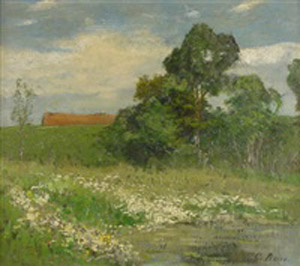
- Sommerlandschaft
- Born: 26 September 1857; Ried im Innkreis, Austrian Empire
- Died: 9 September 1940 (aged 82); Munich, Nazi Germany
- Known for: Painting
- Spouse: Fritz Baer (m. 1890)

Carola Baer-von Mathes (1857–1940) was a German landscape painter.

== Biography ==
Baer-von Mathes was born on 26 September 1857 in Ried im Innkreis, Austrian Empire.

She was married to fellow painter Fritz Baer. She exhibited her work at the Woman's Building at the 1893 World's Columbian Exposition in Chicago, Illinois.

From 1891 to 1899 she exhibited regularly in the Munich Glaspalast, also at the Munich Secession, in the Kunstverein and on the occasion of the exhibitions of the Artists' Association, including in 1903 in the exhibition of works by Munich artists in the Künstlerhaus on the occasion of the 3rd Bavarian Women's Day.

From 1890 to 1894, Baer-von Mathes was director of the landscape and still life class of the Munich Artists' Association and taught at the women's academy that emerged from this until the 1930s.

She died on 9 September 1940 in Munich.
