= Carola Stabe =

Carola Stabe is a former dissident and civil rights activist in East Germany GDR. She is the founder and leader of the environmental group ARGUS in Potsdam, Germany. She initiated the GDR- wide opposition network of environmental groups, which later converged in the Grüne Liga.

Stabe was born in 1955 in Templin, Mecklenburg. Her father, Dr. Siegfried Stabe, was detained by the Soviets in 1945. Later, he became a member of the Socialist Unity Party of Germany, a school principal and a representative in the East German People's Chamber. In 1975, during her studies of History and Russian at Humboldt University of Berlin, she was arrested because of a publication about the Soviet Gulags. From 1977 on, she worked as a teacher in Potsdam.

In April 1988, she initiated the founding of the group ARGUS (Consortium for Environmental Protection and Urban Design), which she led until December, 1989. In the summer of 1988, she began to build a network of environmental groups. As her base she used the Cultural Association of the GDR, the only place where assembly was legal, under the scrutiny of the Stasi. In April 1988 she organized the first GDR- wide meeting of environmental groups at the Cultural Association, together with Matthias Platzeck and other members of the ARGUS group in Potsdam. In June 1989, she organized, the 1. Potsdamer Pfingsbergfest, a public gathering at which the Stasi counted 3000 visitors from all over the GDR, together with Wieland Eschenburg and Matthias Platzeck. She used administrative loopholes to circumvent a prohibition of the assembly. During the gathering, oppositional groups distributed information leaflets.

A poster by graphic artist Bob Bahra and an information leaflet published by ARGUS helped to stop the demolition of Potsdam’s baroque city center, which had been planned by the leadership of the SED (Socialist Unity Party of Germany). Because of her active role at Pfingstbergfest and other events that were critical of the system, Stabe was dismissed from the teaching profession in July 1989, for reasons of "counterrevolutionary activities".

On October 7, 1989 she organized, together with Matthias Platzeck, the second GDR-wide meeting. 124 representatives of environmental groups followed an ARGUS invitation to Potsdam’s Cultural Association. The GDR leadership could not forbid the meeting. Stabe had announced it as a festivity for the 40th anniversary of the GDR. On the evening of October 7, representatives of the environmental groups signed a declaration, expressing the need for political changes and human rights in the GDR. The declaration was sent to the press in East- and West Berlin. During the meeting on October 7, a small group of dissidents around Stabe and Platzeck planted the idea for an environmental organization that would exist independently from the Cultural Association. In October 1989, the founding appeal for a "Green League" (Grüne Liga) was drafted. On November 15, 1989, Carola Stabe, Matthias Platzeck and members of the ARGUS group organized the 1. Potsdamer Umweltnacht an event at Potsdam’s Karl Liebknecht Stadium. Here, they made their call for he founding of the Grüne Liga public, in front of 3,000 people. From the middle of October 1989 on, Staube took part in talks towards the creation of a Green Party of the GDR.

Following the fall of the Berlin Wall on November 9, 1989, she became a founding member of the GDR’s Green Party on November 24, 1989. Simultaneously, she worked in the speakers’ council of the Grüne Liga to foster the collaboration between both groups.

On December 5, 1989, she took part in the occupation of the Stasi headquarters in Potsdam. With a group of fellow dissidents she founded the Rat der Volkskontrolle, which organized the transition to a democratic system in Potsdam. At the Zentraler Runder Tisch (Central Round Table) in Berlin and at the Round Table in Potsdam she represented the Grüne Liga. She partook in the organization of the founding congresses of the Grüne Liga, as well as the Green Party. Her election into the federal board was prevented by the wrongful allegation that she had worked for the Stasi. Henry Schramm, the person who made the allegation, was later exposed as an agent of the Stasi, posing as a dissident in the opposition movement.

From December 7 to April 30, 1990, she headed the office of Grüne Liga in Potsdam and later in Berlin. From May 1990 to July 1992 she was the executive director of Grüne Liga e. V. She supported the creation of environmental centers in the GDR’s 14 district cities and realized projects to build environmental counseling. She helped to prepare the United Nations Conference on Environment and Development in Brasil for the Federal Republic of Germany. In September 1994 she was politically and professionally rehabilitated and started to work in Brandenburg against right-wing extremism, for democratic participation and for a critical assessment of GDR history. In 2005, with Bob Bahra, she founded the Forum zur kritischen Auseinandersetzung mit der DDR-Geschichte (Forum for the Critical Exploration of GDR History). Since 2006, she works with Stefan Roloff on the production of films and art projects dealing with the history of the GDR. In 2011 she founded the Gemeinschaft der Verfolgten des DDR-Systems (Association of the Persecuted of the GDR System), together with Bob Bahra, Sibylle Schönemann and Birgit Willschütz.

== Literature ==
- Reinhard Meinel/Thomas Wernicke: Mit tschekistischem Gruß - Berichte der Bezirksverwaltung für Staatssicherheit Potsdam 1990, Verlag Edition Babelturm, ISBN 978-3910168060.
- Gisela Rüdiger, Gudrun Rogal: Die 111 Tage des Potsdamer Bürgerkommitees „Rat der Volkskontrolle“ Brandenburgische Landeszentrale für politische Bildung, 2009, ISBN 3-932502-56-6.
