= Carola Hoffmann =

German field hockey player

Personal information
- Full name: Carola Ingrid Hoffmann
- Born: 6 November 1962 (age 63) Goslar, West Germany
- Height: 1.72 m (5 ft 8 in)
- Weight: 61 kg (134 lb)

Sport
- Sport: Field hockey
Senior career
Years	Team	Caps	Goals
–	Eintracht Braunschweig	-	-
–	Stuttgarter Kickers	-	-
National team
Years	Team	Caps	Goals
1985–1989	West Germany	70	-
Medal record
Women's field hockey
Representing West Germany
Women's Hockey World Cup
Silver medal – second place	1986 Amstelveen	Team

Carola Ingrid Boomes (née Hoffmann, born 6 November 1962 in Goslar) is a German former field hockey player who competed in the 1988 Summer Olympics. In total, she represented West Germany in 70 matches.
