= Carola Richards =

English artist (1916–2004)

Carola Richards (1916–2004) was an English artist and member of the Eastbourne Group.

== Life and work ==
Born in Salford, Greater Manchester Richards graduated with a degree in geology in 1938 and then qualified as a housing manager, in which profession she worked until 1973. Carola began painting in her early forties, eventually taking early retirement and moving to Brighton, East Sussex to pursue her art full-time. She then studied painting, drawing and printmaking under Hayward Veal (1913–1968), Peter Richmond, George W. Hooper (1910–1994) and John Hardy Meadows (b. 1912). She continued to study drawing and painting for the rest of her life, exploring a wide variety of approaches and media along the way.

Following early impressionistic work and a period of hard-edge abstraction, procuring influence of Avant-Garde art from the great war period; Cubism, Futurism and Vorticism, she progressed to a mature way of working resulting in a colourful exploration of figurative and imaginary subjects. As with Matisse, colour was Carola's primary interest and she achieved subtle and unusual relationships. Another side of her personality engendered strange images; colourful, whimsical, surreal, often bizarre; strange forms appeared as she worked over and over paintings going, as she said, in unforeseen directions and often surprising herself with the final results. She described the process of painting as 'frustrating, mysterious and exciting'.

In 1997 Richards donated two oil paintings by Dennis Creffield to the Brighton Museum & Art Gallery.

In her mid-eighties Richards decided to learn how to use a computer as a painting tool, and in 1999 her computer prints were exhibited in the Arundel exhibition.

As a person Richards was extremely sociable, caring and thoughtful; always strongly emotionally involved in the lives of her many friends. She travelled widely and learned several languages, most notably Russian, which she continued to study with great dedication until her death in 2004.

== Exhibitions ==
Elected a member of the Eastbourne Group of artists in 1993, she exhibited widely, including at Brighton University 1975; University of Essex 1980; Tichbourne Studios, Brighton 1981; The London Group in 1982 & 1984; Towner Art Gallery, Eastbourne 1983; Royal College of Art, London 1984; Brighton Gallery of Fine Art 1987; Red Herring Gallery, Brighton 1989; Brighton Festival 1991; Albion Gallery, Lewes 1991 & 1992; Brighton Museum & Art Gallery 1995 & 1998; Arundel 1999, culminating in a large retrospective at the Towner Gallery, Eastbourne in 2006.
