= Jiří Anderle =

Czech painter and graphic artist (born 1936)

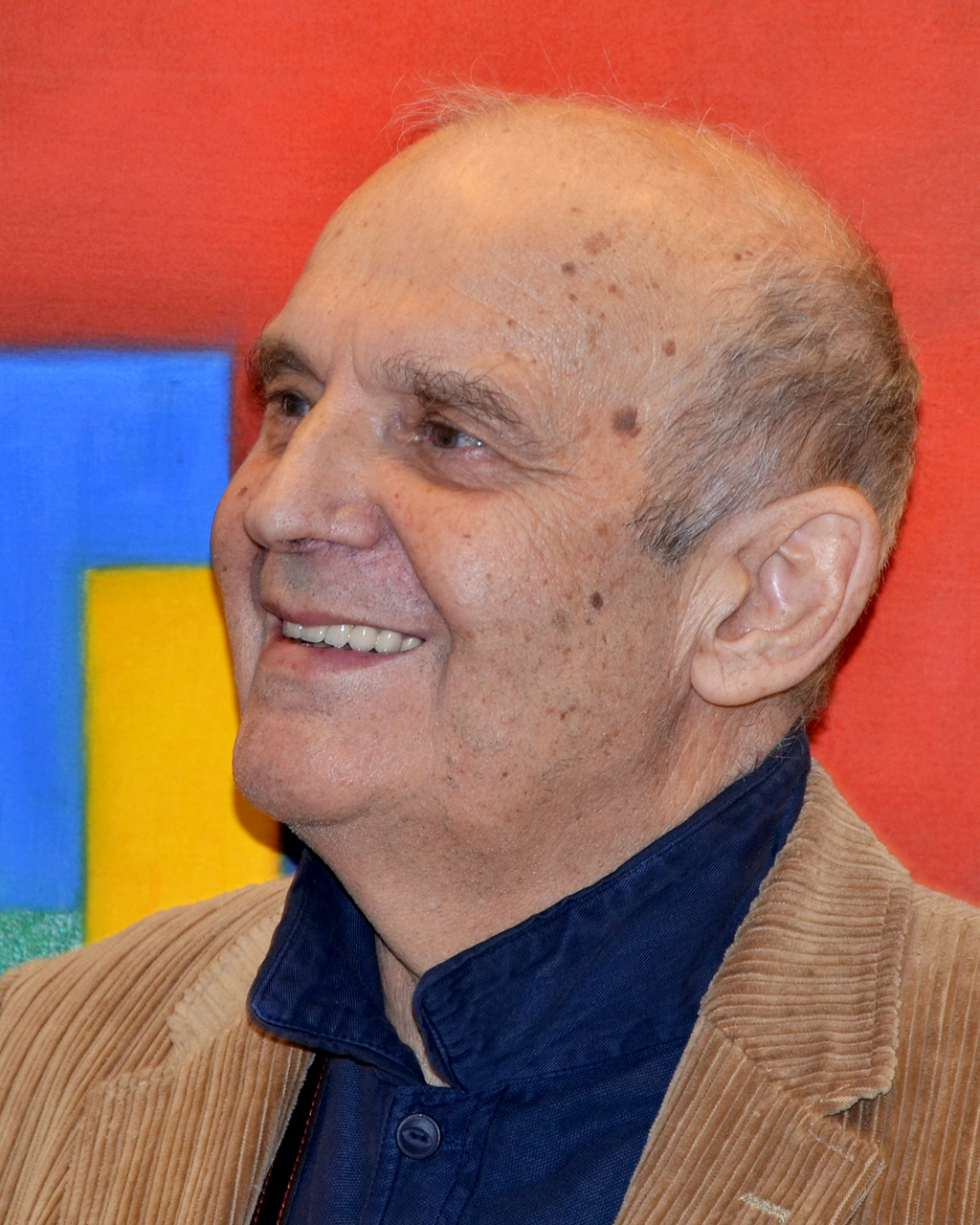
Anderle in 2013

Jiří Anderle (born 14 September 1936) is a Czech painter and graphic artist. He is of assimilated German ethnic ancestry from paternal side.

== Career ==
Anderle was born on 14 September 1936 in Pavlíkov. In 1961, he graduated from the Academy of Fine Arts (painting with Antonín Pelc and graphics with Vladimír Silovský). From 1969 to 1973, he worked as an assistant at the UIA Zdeněk Sklenář and Jiří Trnka.

In dozens of his works, Anderle expresses the human existential anxiety and general timelessness. Recently, his work has moved closer to abstraction.

Anderle has made nearly 100 solo exhibitions throughout the world and his work is represented in some 40 galleries and museums including the Metropolitan Museum of Art in New York City and Pompidou Centre in Paris.

== Awards ==
In 2006, he was awarded the Medal of Merit (III. degree).

== See also ==
- List of Czech painters
