= Carola Cobo =

Bolivian theater and radio artist (1909–2003)

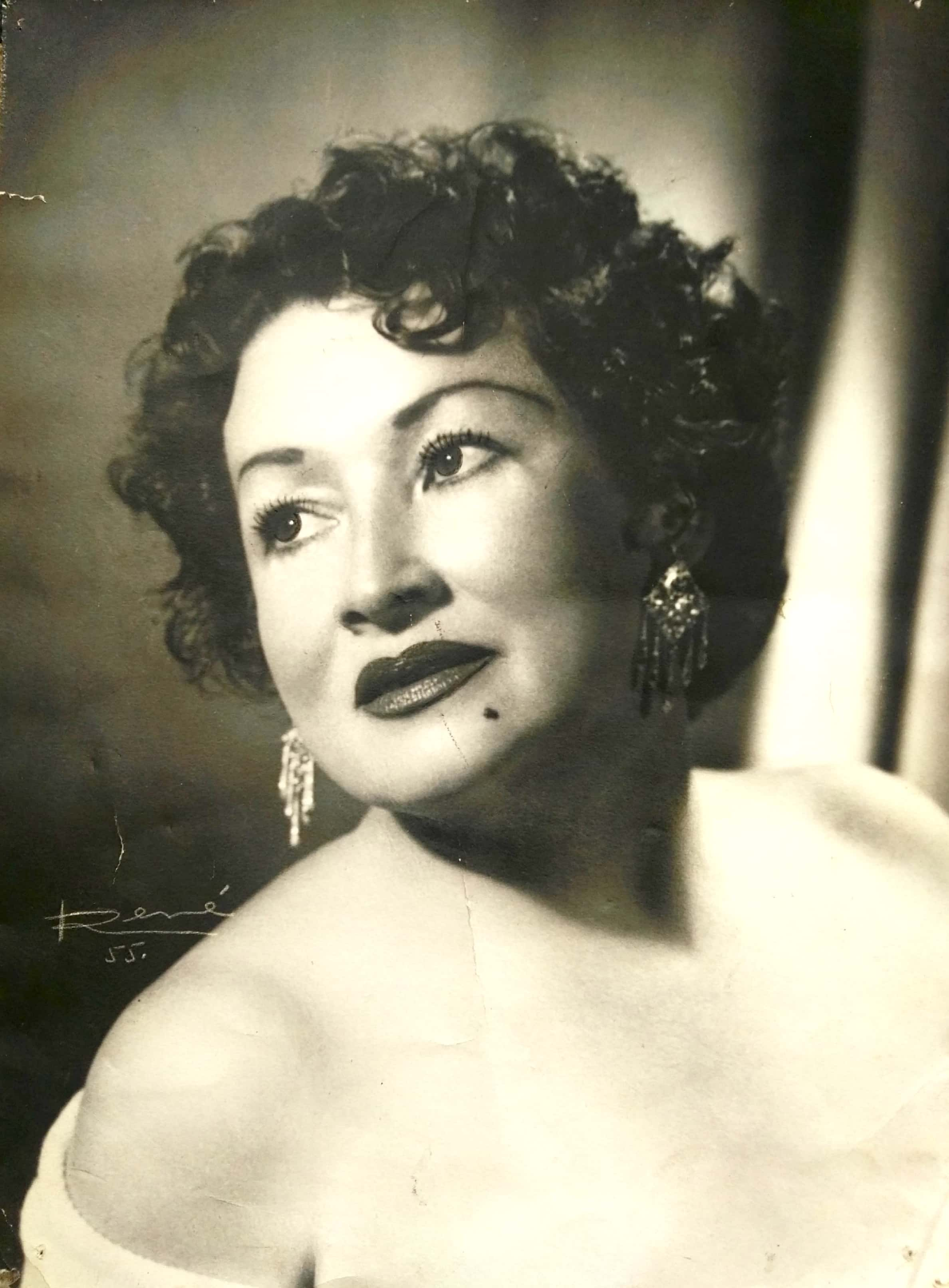
- Cobo in 1950
- Born: Carolina Cobo Paz; 1909; Pando Department, Bolivia
- Died: 2003 (aged 93–94); La Paz, Bolivia
- Occupation(s): Writer, theater and radio artist
- Notable work: La mágica repostería de Doña Carola Cobo, Masitas, postres y jugos, Recetario de comidas bolivianas y extranjeras
- Spouse: Alberto Ruíz Lavadenz
- Children: 3

Carola Cobo (1909–2003) was a Bolivian theater and radio artist, known for her books of culinary recipes.

== Biography ==
Carola Cobo was born in Pando Department, Bolivia, in 1909. At the time of her birth, however, it was just a territory of colonies; the department was founded in 1938. Carola was the daughter of José Reyes Cobo and Carolina Paz. She married the musician Alberto Ruíz Lavadenz.

In 1929, together with her husband, she founded the Tiahuanacu Drama and Comedy Company, which was later attended by prominent Bolivian actors such as Wenceslao Monroy and Maco Ibargüen. With the arrival of the Chaco War, the company was dissolved, but reunited in 1941, this time under the direction of Monroy. Cobo was the first actress in the cast, with whom she toured all over the country with great success.

Upon returning from the tour, Cobo founded her own radio theater company, with which she appeared on Radio Illimani, Radio Sucre, and Radio Bolívar. She also produced a special program to be heard at home: Cartas a una madre.

In 1940, she called on the Arteaga family of musicians to form a folk music group in which she would sing. In 1941, this group entered a contest in Chile, where it won first place and the chance of recording ten albums. Among some of the awarded works were "Aguilita Voladora", composed by Alberto Arteaga, and "Me amarás hasta el cielo", by Julio Arteaga.

In her career as an actress, Cobo also participated in works of the Company of Social Theater of the famous playwright and mayor of La Paz, Raúl Salmón. She also appeared in Marcos Loayza's short film El olor de la vejez, based on the books Los cuartos and Vidas y muertes by Jaime Sáenz.

In 1954, she traveled to Buenos Aires where she studied cosmetics, beauty, and hairdressing. In the literary field, her Carta a mi difunta madre is notable, and obtained an honorable mention in a contest sponsored by the Women's Christian Association. However, her work as a writer of Bolivian and international recipes is better remembered.

Cobo died in La Paz in 2003.

== Publications ==
- Recetario de comidas bolivianas y extranjeras, 1986
- La mágica repostería, 1993
