= Carola Unterberger-Probst =

Austrian artist

- Born: 9 May 1978 (age 47); Salzburg, Austria
- Website: Official website

Carola Unterberger-Probst (born 1978), aka [cup] or Carola Unterberger, is an Austrian media artist and philosopher of art. In addition to video installations and experimental films, her work contains Objet d'art, paintings and digital art. She specializes in the postmodern discourse, deconstruction, and questions on media and the arts.

In 2009 she published a book, "Der Filmische Hypertext: Links im Film - Film als Link".
