= Literaturpreis Prenzlauer Berg =

Literary prize in Germany

Literaturpreis Prenzlauer Berg is a literary prize of Germany for young writers.

== Recipients ==
- 2001 Jan Brandt, Monika Rinck, Daniel Falb
- 2002 Larissa Boehning, Niklas Ritter
- 2003 Svenja Leiber, Louisa Söllner, Susan Kreller
- 2004 Jana Scheerer, Martina Wildner, Friederike von Koenigswald
- 2005 Daniel Gräfe, Sascha Reh, Kolja Mensing
- 2006 Myriam Keil, Diana Feuerbach, Carsten Schneider
- 2007 Caroline Schleier, Alexandra Steffes, Steffen Roye
- 2008 Christian de Simoni, Katharina Bendixen, Anders Kamp, Benjamin Lauterbach
- 2009 Thomas Mahler, Daniel Kindslehner, Christina Kettering, Isabel Cole
- 2010 Jens Deeg, Jasamin Ulfat, Pierre Horn
- 2011 Jenifer Joanna Becker, Stefanie de Velasco
- 2012 Christoph Schreiber, Anna-Maria Brehm, Jan Decker
- 2013 Diana Heinrich, André Hager
- 2014 Ursula Kirchenmayer, Lili Wang, Maximilian Deibert
- 2015 Valentin Moritz, Saskia Trebing, Christian Dittloff
- 2016 Jan Weidner, Angela Lehner, Nadine Schneider
- 2017 David Blum, Judith Lehmann, Alexander Raschle
- 2018 Sebastian Behr, Demian Lienhard, Carola Gruber
- 2019 Simoné Lechner, Rina Schmeller, Marie Lucienne Verse
