= Francesco de' Franceschi =

Italian painter

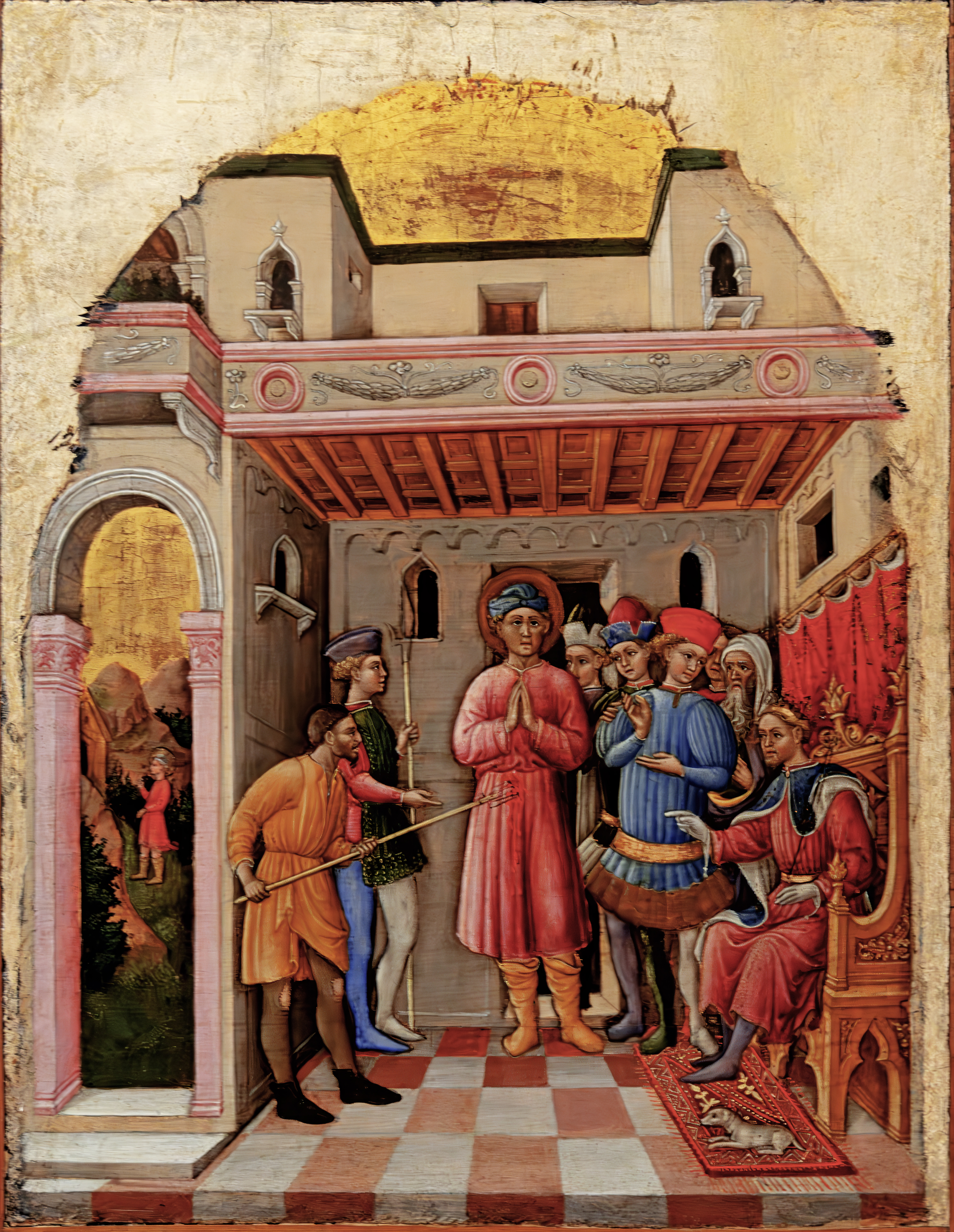
Martyrdom of St Mamete by Francesco de' Franceschi, Museo Correr

Francesco de' Franceschi (fl. 1443 – 1468) was an Italian Renaissance painter. His exact dates of birth and death are not known.

Not much is known about Francesco de' Franceschi's except through his works. He primarily painted religious-themed works for church commissions. His style shows influence from Michele Giambono, and it is possible that he collaborated with Antonio Vivarini in Venice. An altarpiece which was most likely from a church in Padua or Venice and now is in the Museo Civico, Padua (1447) has been attributed to him. Two panels St. Mary Magdalen and St Catherine of Alexandria are located in the Ashmolean Museum.
