= Carolien =

Carolien is a Dutch and Swedish feminine given name. It is a feminine form of Carolus, and a diminutive form of Carolina and Caroline.

== Given names ==
- Carolien Salomons (born 1974), Dutch cricketer
- Carolien van Kilsdonk (born 1963), Dutch snowboarder

== See also ==
- Caroline (name)
