= Franceschini =

Franceschini is an Italian surname. Notable people with the surname include:

- Alberto Franceschini (1947–2025), Italian former terrorist, co-founder of the Red Brigades
- Alfredo De Franceschini (1902–1959), Italian professional footballer and football manager
- Amy Franceschini (born 1970), American artist and designer
- Baldassare Franceschini (1611–1689), Italian late Baroque painter and draughtsman
- Bob Franceschini (born 1961), American jazz saxophonist, songwriter, arranger
- Daniele Franceschini (born 1976), Italian football manager and former player
- Dario Franceschini (born 1958), Italian lawyer, writer, politician
- Eugenio Franceschini (born 1991), Italian actor
- Ezio Franceschini (1906–1983), Italian professor of medieval literature, Latin scholar and philologist
- Fabio Franceschini (born 1988) Italian former footballer
- Giacomo Franceschini (1672–1745), Italian painter
- Ivan Franceschini (born 1976), Italian football coach and former player
- Livio Franceschini (1913–1975), Italian basketball player who competed in the 1936 Summer Olympics
- Marcantonio Franceschini (1648–1729), Italian painter of the Baroque period
- Petronio Franceschini (1651–1680), Italian Baroque music composer
- Ruggero Franceschini (1939–2024), Italian Roman Catholic archbishop

== See also ==
- Franceschi
