= Leslie Charlotte Benenson =

English artist who worked in sculpture, oils, watercolours, ceramics and calligraphy

Leslie Charlotte Benenson, R.E. (13 January 1941 - 18 February 2018) was an English artist who worked in a variety of different mediums, including sculpture, oils, watercolours, ceramics and calligraphy.

== Life and work ==
Benenson was born in London, where she attended La Sagesse Convent High School, before studying art at the Regent Street Polytechnic (1958–63) under Geoffrey H. Deeley and James Osborne. She was awarded a National Diploma in Design in 1962.

In addition to her permanent studies, Benenson took private calligraphy tuition with Anthony Wood between 1963–64, after which she was elected a member to the Society of Scribes & Illuminators.

After successfully exhibiting work at the Royal Academy from 1962, and at the Royal Society of Painter-Etchers and Engravers from 1968, Benenson was elected to member status of the latter institution in 1978. Additionally, Benenson was one of the founder members of the Society of Equestrian Artists in 1979.

She is exhibited widely, and her work can be found in many public and private collections, including the Towner Art Gallery, Ashmolean, Hereford Museum and the International Exlibriscentrum.

== Exhibitions ==
=== Solo ===
- 1971 - Rye Art Gallery
- 1971 - Michelham Priory
- 1975 - John Gage Gallery, Eastbourne
- 1976 - Michelham Priory

=== Group ===
- 1966 - Royal Academy, London
- 1967 - Royal Academy, London
- 1968 - Royal Society of Painter-Etchers and Engravers
- 1969 - Royal Academy, London
- 1970 - Royal Academy, London
- 1971 - Victoria & Albert Museum, London
- 1971 - Royal Academy, London
- 1972 - Royal Academy, London
- 1979 - Victoria & Albert Museum, London
- 1980 - Linz, Austria
- 1981 - Sint-Niklaas, Antwerp, Belgium
- 1981 - Biala Podlaska, Poland
