= Franceschetti =

Franceschetti is an Italian surname. Notable people with the surname include:

- Adolphe Franceschetti (1896–1968), Swiss ophthalmologist
  - Franceschetti–Klein syndrome
  - Naegeli–Franceschetti–Jadassohn syndrome
  - Franceschetti-Zwahlen-Klein syndrome
  - Treacher Collins-Franceschetti syndrome 1
- Benito Gennaro Franceschetti (1935–2012), Italian Roman Catholic archbishop of Fermo
- Bruno Franceschetti (1941–2025), Italian gymnast
- Lou Franceschetti (born 1958), Canadian ice hockey player
- Marco Franceschetti (born 1967), Italian footballer
