= Carola Frege =

German scholar (born 1965)

- Born: Carola Maria Frege; 24 September 1965 (age 61)
- Occupation: Professor

Academic background
- Education: BSc, MSc, PhD
- Alma mater: London School of Economics; University of Fribourg; University of Basel
- Thesis: Workplace relations in East Germany after unification: Explaining worker participation in trade unions and works councils (1996)

Academic work
- Discipline: Management, Employment Relations
- Sub-discipline: International Employment Relations; Industrial Democracy; Trade Unions; Migration; Populism
- Institutions: London School of Economics and Political Science; Rutgers University

Carola Frege (born 1965) is a German scholar who specialises in international and comparative employment relations. Her research interests include industrial democracy, employee participation, trade unions, migration, and populism. Since 2008, she has been professor of comparative employment relations at the London School of Economics (LSE). She was previously assistant and associate professor of labor relations at Rutgers School of Management and Labor Relations (SMLR) (2001–2003), and lecturer and reader in industrial relations at the London School of Economics Department (1996-2001 and 2003-2008). Frege is currently a senior research fellow of the International Inequalities Institute at London School of Economics (since 2021).

== Early life and education ==
Frege was born in 1965 in Düsseldorf to Karl Ludwig Frege, a German businessman and Roswitha Frege, an Austrian national. As an undergraduate she studied management and human resource management at University of Fribourg and at University of Basel. She then undertook undergraduate studies and postgraduate studies at London School of Economics, completing a general course in sociology in 1990. a Master of Science in industrial relations in 1992 and a PhD in industrial relations in 1996. Her doctoral thesis was titled Workplace relations in East Germany after unification: Explaining worker participation in trade unions and works councils.

== Academic career ==
From 1996 to 2001, Frege was a lecturer in industrial relations at London School of Economics. In 2001, she joined the Rutgers School of Management and Labor Relations and was appointed an associate professor in 2003. Then, from 2003 to 2008, she was an associate professor of comparative employment relations at the London School of Economics. In 2008, she became a full professor in the Management Department of the London School of Economics. During her time at LSE, she held a number of visiting appointments at other universities: she was a post-doc fellow at the Max Planck Institute for the Study of Societies in 1999, a visiting professor at the Cornell University School of Industrial and Labor Relations (1999-2000), a visiting professor at the WZB Berlin Social Science Center in 2000 and 2008, a visiting professor in 2008 at UCLA Anderson School of Management, and from 2012 to 2013 a visiting professor at the Free University of Berlin. In 2002 she received the John T. Dunlop Award.

== Other work ==
Frege was an output assessor for the British REF Research Excellence Framework in Management in 2014. From 2015 to 2017, Frege was the chair of LSE's Taskforce on Equity, Diversity and Inclusion and a member of LSE’s Senior Management Committee, Directorate. From 1998 to 2007, she was an Editor of the British Journal of Industrial Relations and from 2008-2012 Chief Editor. Since 2012 she has been a member of the International Advisory Board and since 2021 she has been the chair of BJIR's Steering Group.

== Selected works ==
- Frege, Carola; Kelly, John (2020). Comparative Employment Relations in the Global Economy (2nd ed.). London: Routledge. ISBN 978-1138683020. |url=https://www.routledge.com/Comparative-Employment-Relations-in-the-Global-Economy/Frege-Kelly/p/book/9781138683020
- Frege, Carola (2007). Employment Relations and State Traditions: A Comparative History of Britain, Germany and the United States. Oxford: Oxford University Press. ISBN 978-0199208067. |url=https://global.oup.com/academic/product/employment-research-and-state-traditions-9780199208067?cc=de&lang=en&
- Frege, Carola; Kelly, John (2004). Varieties of Unionism: Strategies for Union Revitalization in a Globalizing Economy. Oxford: University of Oxford Press. ISBN 978-0199270149. |url=https://global.oup.com/academic/product/varieties-of-unionism-9780199270149?cc=de&lang=en&
- Frege, Carola (1999). Social Partnership at Work: Workplace Relations in Post-unification Germany. London: Routledge. ISBN 978-0415785860. |url=https://www.routledge.com/Social-Partnership-at-Work-Workplace-Relations-in-Post-Unification-Germany/Frege/p/book/9780415785860

== See also ==
- S. M. Rodriguez
- Anne Phillips
- Julia Black
