= Carola Pavlik =

Dutch contemporary artist (born 1978)

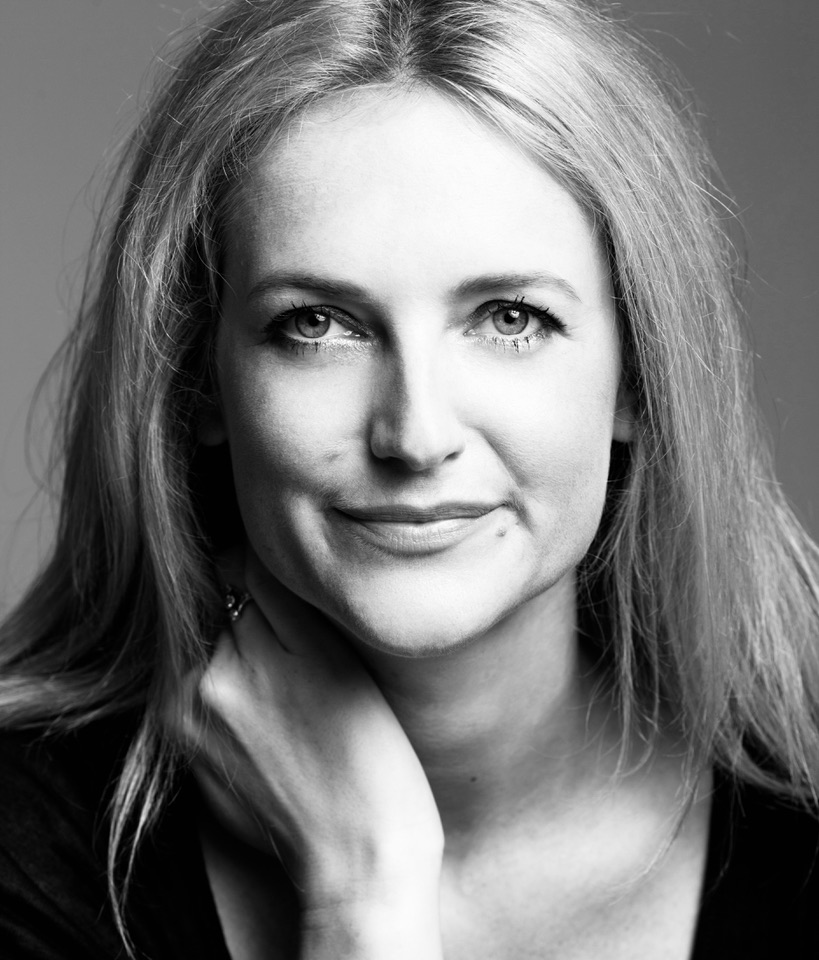
Carola Pavlik

Carola Pavlik (born 1978) is a Dutch contemporary artist.

== Biography ==
As an artist and creator of Czech descent Carola became interested in the art of human behaviour and beauty as a child.

Pavlik was born in The Hague. She started her career as an artist by creating female figures from aluminum, paper, and acrylic. These collections, where the focus has been on the female body, were exhibited in the So ART GALLERY in Amsterdam and at a private collector exhibition in Antwerp.

With her mirror art, Carola Pavlik tells the story of how art can be used to inspire change. One of her main subjects is creating self-awareness, her artwork seems to be transformed by light.

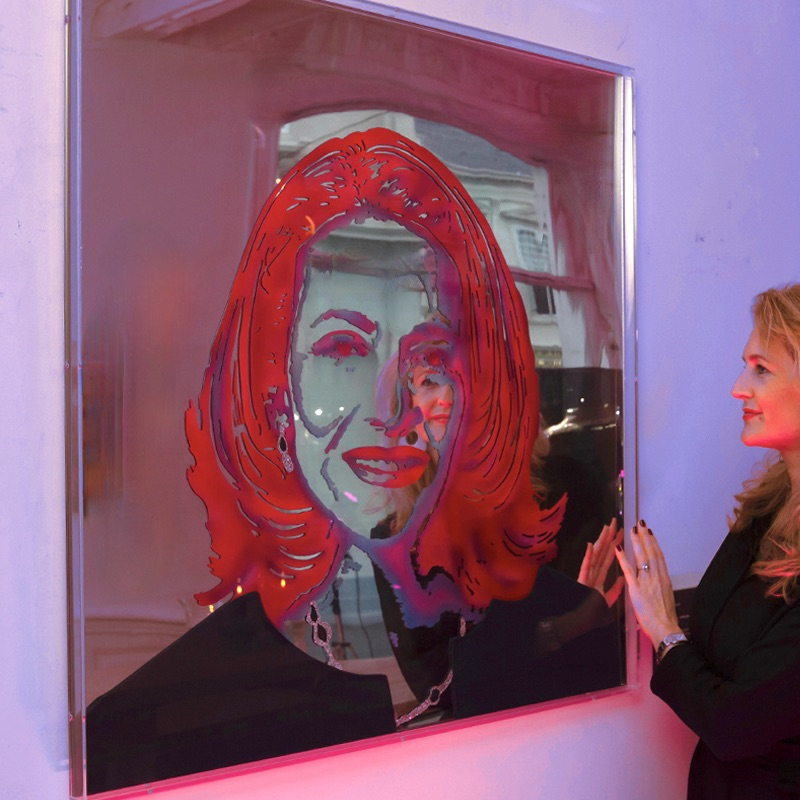
Iconic Reflection Sheryl Sandberg

One of her pieces is the sculpture “Shine”, a feminine body covered with 57,000 Swarovski crystals. “Shine” holds a special crystal key to her precious body. She represents all women in complete acceptance and thankful for the beautiful body they were given. Each crystal, every woman, is ready to “Shine.”

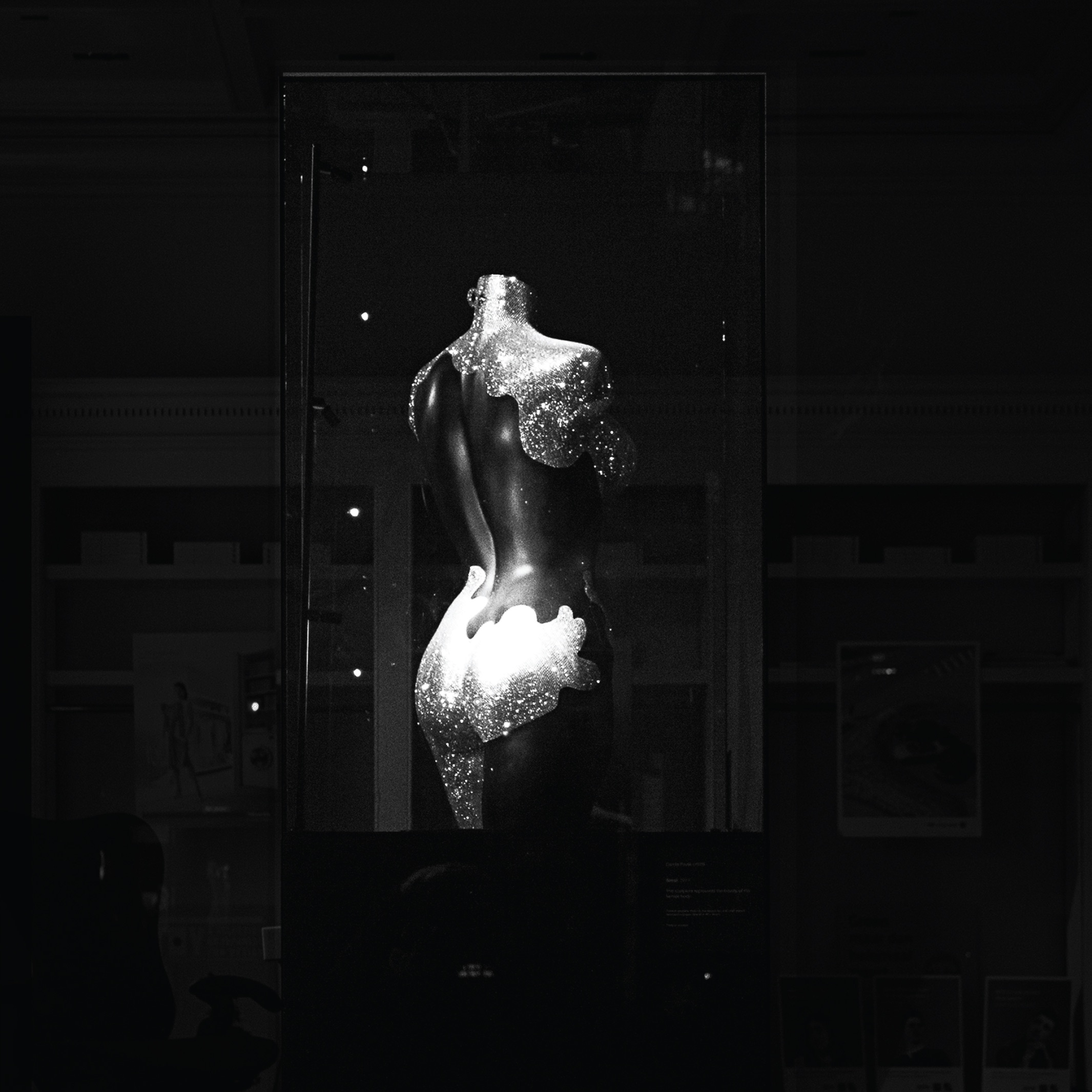
Sculpture "Shine", handmade out of 57,000 crystals.

Her collection Iconic Reflections is made of brightly coloured large mirror artworks of seventeen inspiring women: Oprah Winfrey, Hillary Clinton, Beyoncé, Sheryl Sandberg, Julia Roberts, Queen Noor, Michelle Obama, Madonna, Sonia Gandhi, Angela Merkel, Angelina Jolie, Kate Middleton, Queen Maxima, Princess Beatrix, Dilma Rousseff, Kate Moss and Linda de Mol.

Her work has been exhibited in Antwerp, Amsterdam and London. Carola has also been featured a.o in Dutch TV, RTL Boulevard, AD, Blauw Bloed, WEF and interviewed for a program by the UN Women.
