= Carola Kinasha =

Tanzanian musician (born 1972)

- Born: Carola Daniel Amri Kinasha; 1962 (age 63–64); Longido, Tanzania
- Origin: Tanzania
- Genres: Afro-Fusion; Bongo-Fusion
- Occupation: Music Artist
- Instruments: Vocals; Guitar
- Years active: (1988 - present)
- Label: Independent
- Website: carolakinasha.com

Carola Daniel Amri Kinasha is a Tanzanian musician. She is a pioneer of traditional fusion in Tanzania. Kinasha is also an activist fighting for the basic rights of musicians in her country. She has worked on campaigns to bring music education back into the schools of Tanzania. In 2000, Kinasha was recognised by the MA Africa Awards in South Africa. Her music crosses cultural boundaries, from Tanzania to the Congo.

== Early life and career ==
Carola Kinasha was born into a family of eight children, in Longido village, close to the Kenyan border. Kinasha's father played the accordion, her brothers played the piano, organ and guitar, and her mother still sings in the village choir. While away at school or travelling, Kinasha's older siblings would bring home music from other areas. Her brother Esto brought home country music, gospel and calypso; Abedi brought soul and classical, Oculi brought Tanzanian and Congolese music while her sister Juddy brought home South African music. At the same time, Kinasha would attend every traditional ceremony within walking distance of her home, where she could hear Maasai warriors and girls singing and dancing.

Kinasha is recognized as one of the pioneers of traditional fusion music in Tanzania. Kinasha's band Shada began in the late 1980s with the aim of creating an authentic Tanzanian sound. Kinasha also sang in 1987 for Tanzanian musician Watafiti under the name of a cooperation project Umoja, which been recorded on the disc. Maono, meaning visions or revelation in Swahili, is their second album. The music crosses cultural boundaries, from Tanzania to the Congo.

Kinasha is a Project Manager in Music Mayday.

Kinasha is also an activist fighting for the basic rights of musicians in her country. She graduated from the University of Dar es Salaam with a Bachelor of Arts Degree in International Relations, implementing her activism through music since 1988. She has worked on campaigns to bring music education back into the schools of Tanzania. In 2002 Kinasha was recognised by the MA Africa Awards in South Africa. Her music crosses cultural boundaries, from Tanzania to the Congo, a unique blend of the traditional with the present.

== Discography ==
=== Albums ===
Release year	Album name	Genre
1988	Umoja	Afro-Fusion
2007	Maono	Bongo-Fusion

== Filmography ==
Release year	Title	Role	Genre
2009	Mwamba Ngoma	as Herself	Documentary
