= Carola Helbing-Erben =

German artist

- Born: Halle (Saale), East Germany
- Children: Anna

Carola Helbing-Erben is a German artist whose work focuses on textile art, including tapestries, as well as mosaic and painting.

== Biography ==
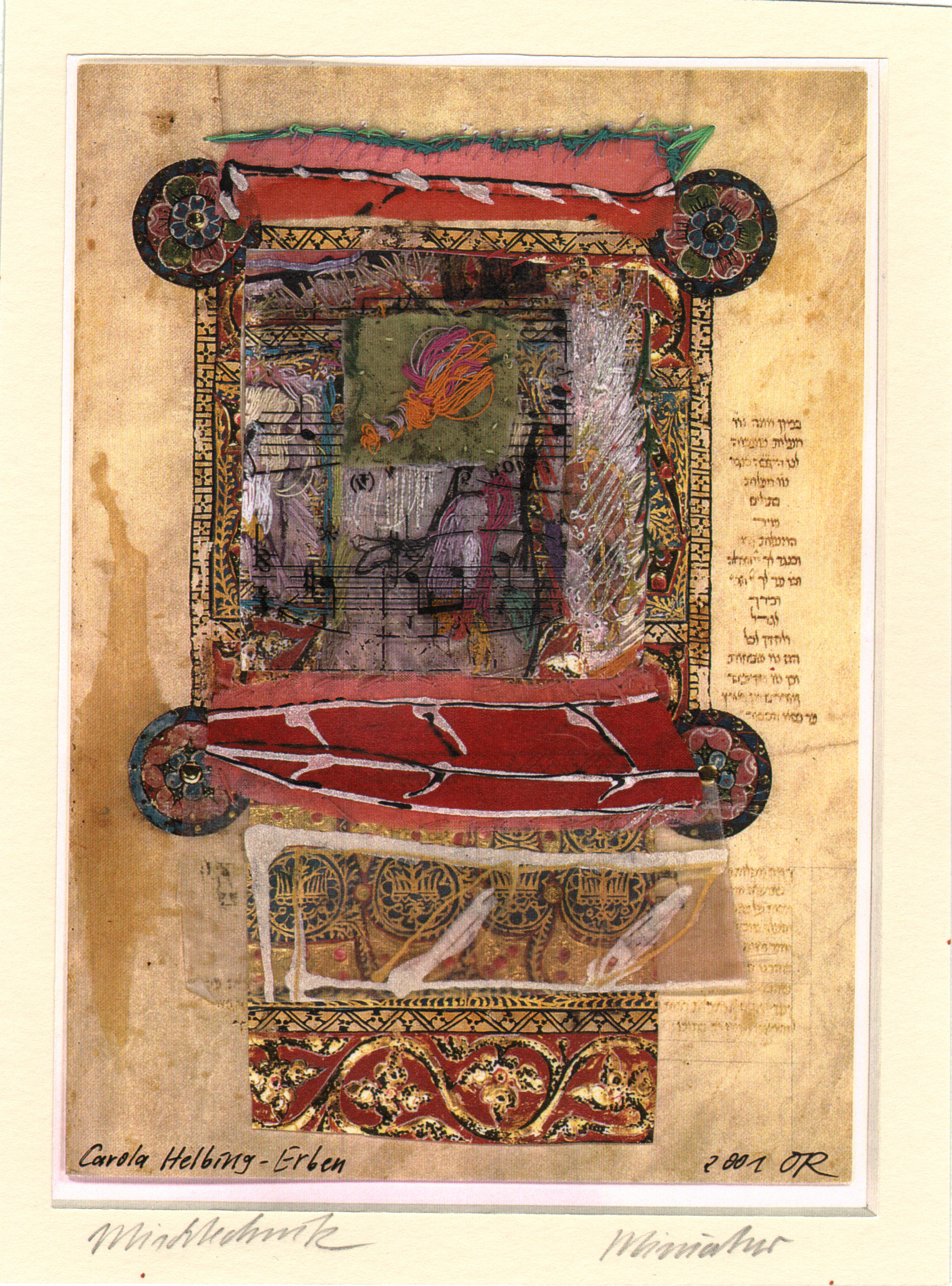
'Miniatur' - Stitching on paper

Helbing-Erben was born in 1952 in Halle (Saale) in East Germany. She attended university in Halle where she obtained a Master of Education degree, and later continued her studies at the Burg Giebichenstein University of Art and Design in Halle. Helbing-Erben was commissioned by Sparkasse Bernburg to research and create artworks for an exhibition.

In 2011, Helbing-Erben received a commission from the city of Bremen to design a large public artwork: a mosaic installation on a wall approximately 75 feet (23 m) in length. She oversaw the installation of the mosaic pieces, which involved participation from children from the surrounding neighbourhood.

Some of Helbing-Erben's works are on permanent display in the Academy of Textile Art at Giebichenstein Castle.

Before the fall of the Berlin Wall, Helbing-Erben authored the book Tageworte im Buch der Gedanken (Reflections on Daily Life). The book, a collection of thoughts, quotations, and short texts on time, culture, and everyday life, was published in 1992 by Frieling-Verlag, Berlin.
