= Jeanne Carola Francesconi =

Italian chef and cookbook author

Jeanne Caròla Francesconi
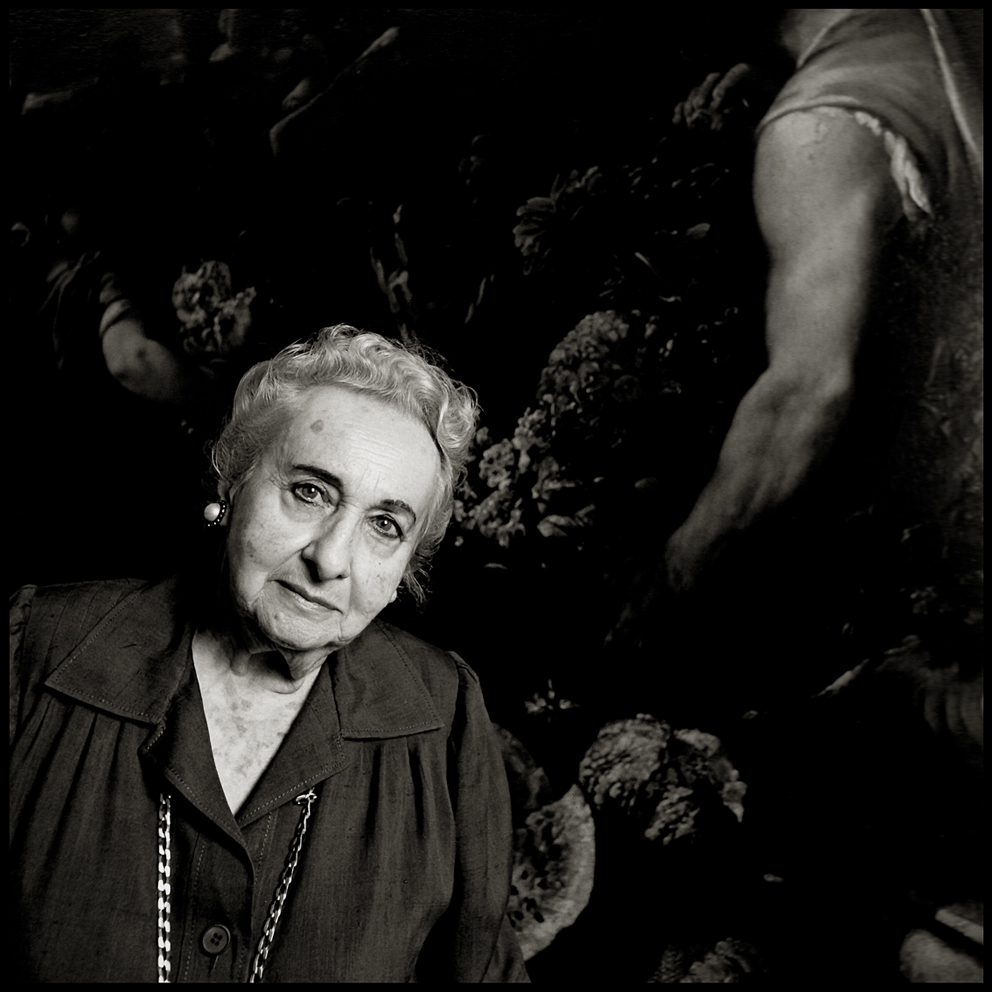
- Jeanne Caròla Francesconi, photo by Augusto De Luca
- Born: July 12, 1903; Naples, Italy
- Died: 1995; Naples, Italy
- Culinary career
- Cooking style: Neapolitan

Jeanne Caròla Francesconi (July 12, 1903, in Naples – 1995, in Naples) was an Italian chef and cookbook author, considered "the dean of Neapolitan cuisine". Her most important work is La cucina napoletana (1965), which has been called the "bible" of Neapolitan cuisine, "the most complete book of [Neapolitan] cuisine", and the most important Neapolitan cookbook after Cavalcanti. She has been quoted in several English-language cookbooks, such as Precious Cargo: How Foods From the Americas Changed The World by Dave DeWitt and The Food Of Italy by Claudia Roden.

Jeanne Francesconi was born in Naples on Via Santa Teresella degli Spagnoli, to Armando Francesconi, descendant of the well-known engineer Pasquale Francesconi, and Silvana Flora Barboglio, daughter of an illustrious Garibaldino from Brescia. After completing her studies at the Suor Orsola Benincasa University Institute, Jeanne was a pupil of the major teachers of the time from Erminia Capocelli to Antonietta Pagliara and Cecilia Dentice. During the First World War, the teenager dedicated herself to the activity of Red Cross nurse. In 1926 she married the Neapolitan engineer Cav. Vincenzo Caròla. She also had the distinction of being one of the first women in Naples to obtain a driver’s license.

Francesconi is remembered as the hostess of several legendary dinners for Naples's upper class.
