= St Mark's Church, Surbiton =

St Mark's
- St Mark's Church, Surbiton
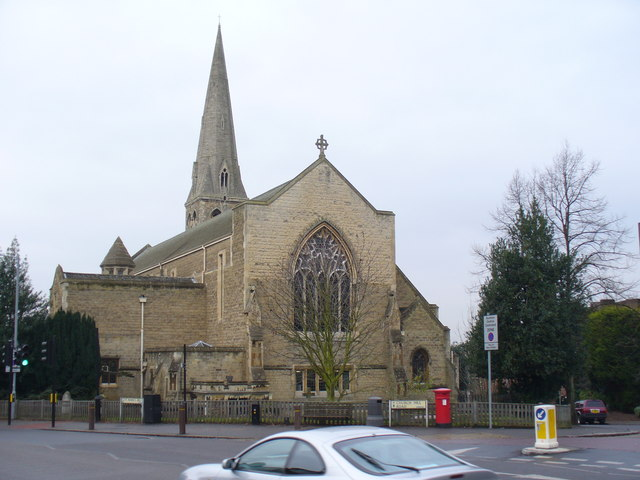
- Surbiton's parish church of Saint Mark
- St Mark's
- 51.3952°N 0.3005°W
- Country: England
- Denomination: Anglican
- Website: St. Mark's Church

Architecture
- Style: Gothic
- Years built: 1845

Administration
- Diocese: Southwark
- Archdeaconry: Wandsworth
- Deanery: Kingston
- Parish: Surbiton

Clergy
- Vicar: Rev'd Robert Stanier

St Mark's Church, Surbiton, is one of two Church of England parish churches in Surbiton, London - the other is St Andrew's. It is dedicated to Saint Mark, and is situated near the top of St Mark's Hill, near the junction with Church Hill Road.

== History ==
Saint Mark's is the oldest church in Surbiton, dating back to 1845. During the course of the 19th century, it was extended, and the spire added towards the end of the century.

St Mark's suffered severe bomb damage during the London Blitz of 1940. Its spire survived but the roof and much of the chancel was destroyed, and the graves in the churchyard scattered.

The church was closed for two decades before being reopened in 1960, after major restoration work. During this time a temporary church hall with a tin roof was used for worship.

In September 2010 the church was closed for restoration again, during which the congregation worshipped at Saint Andrew's. Saint Mark's reopened its doors once more on 24 June 2012. During the restoration, a new hall was installed and the pews replaced by seats.

The church has two books of remembrance scribed by the calligrapher, Mildred Ratcliffe.

== Building ==
Saint Mark's has a light airy interior, with a traditional layout of chancel and nave, and also a Lady chapel. The church is orientated in the traditional way, with the high altar at the east end. The main entrance is through the south porch and door. The tower, spire and north wall were the only surviving parts of the original church which survived the bombing, although the tower has since had to be repaired. They are thus the only places where the work of the Victorian masons and stone carvers can be seen. Most of the gravestones have been removed from the churchyard, as they were broken and damaged, but some interesting monuments remain.

== Gallery ==
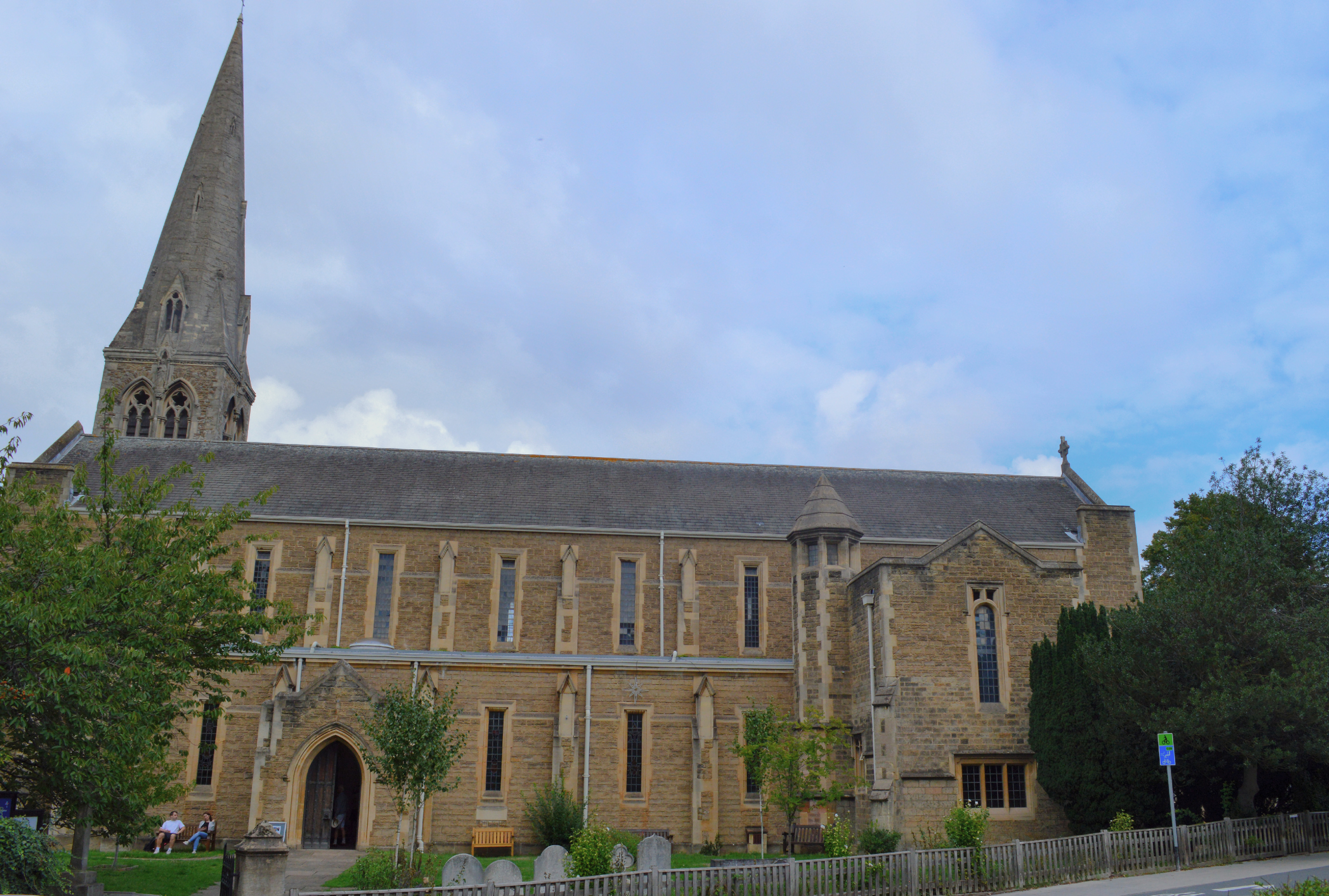
St Mark's Church

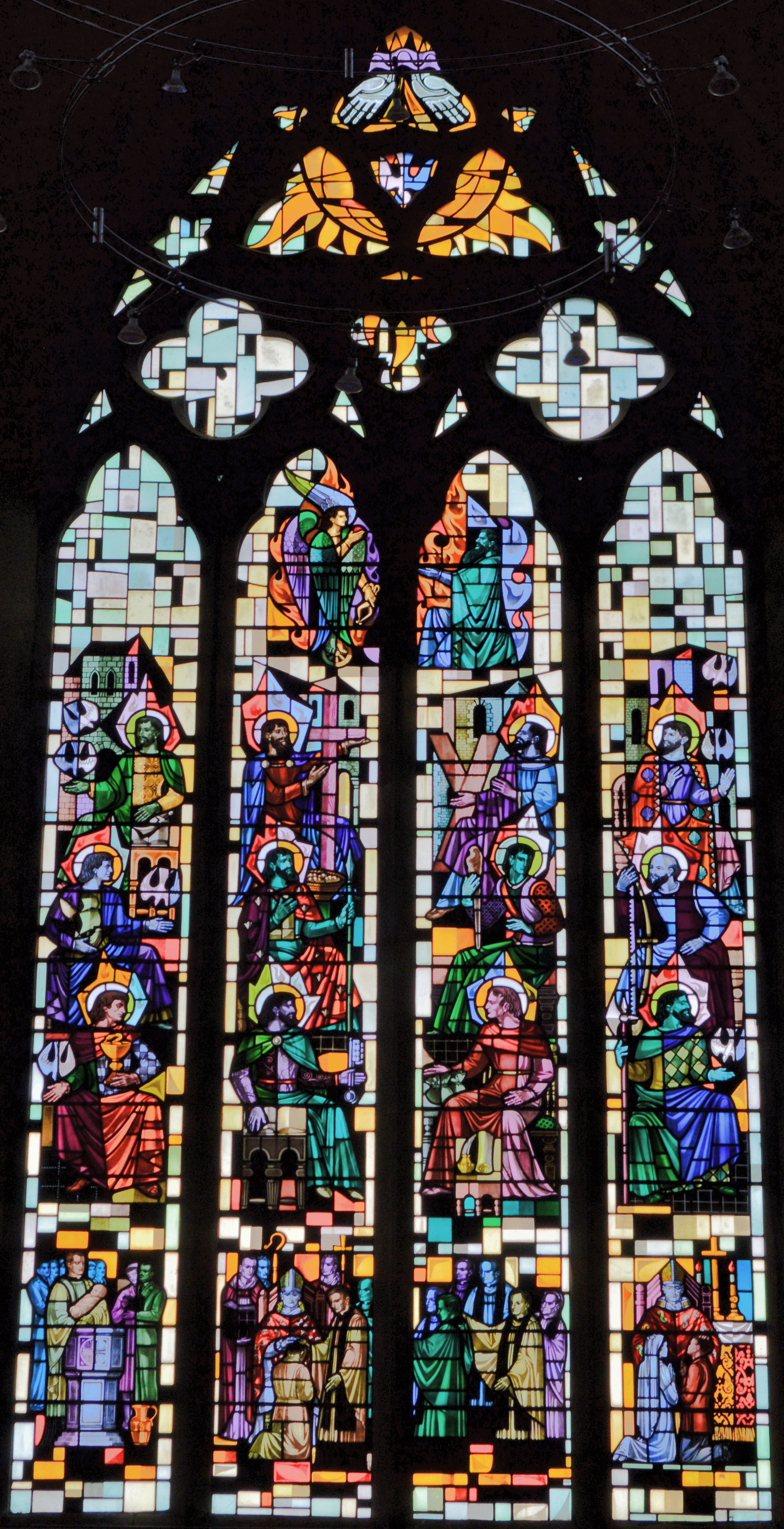
Stained glass by W. T. Carter Shapland (1960)

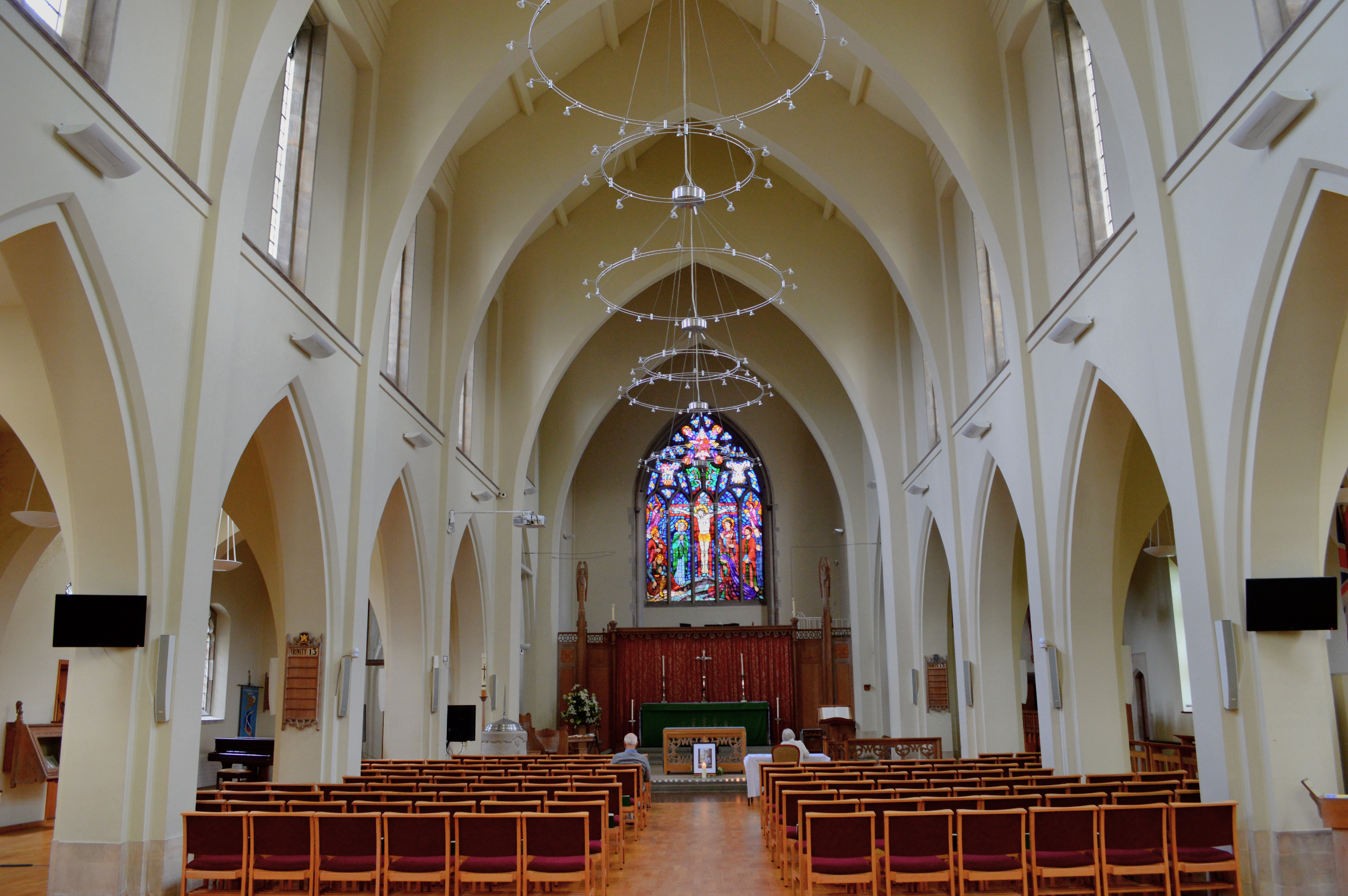
Interior
