= Mildred Ratcliffe =

English painter

Mildred Ratcliffe FSSI
- Born: Mildred Mary Ratcliffe; 17 October 1899; Rochester
- Died: 19 October 1988
- Education: Rochester Grammar School for Girls
- Occupations: Painter, illustrator, calligrapher
- Employer: Post Office Savings Bank
- Awards: Fellow of the Society of Scribes and Illuminators

Mildred Mary Ratcliffe FSSI (1899–1988) was an English painter, commercial artist & calligrapher, known for her poster designs for the Post Office Savings Bank.

== Biography ==
Ratcliffe was born on 17 October 1899 in Rochester, Kent as the second of Alfred and Rose Ratcliffe's seven children, and was educated by a governess, before attending Rochester Grammar School for Girls.

Upon leaving school Ratcliffe took up a position as a wages clerk with the Civil Service, at Chatham Dockyard. Approximately four years later, she became a clerical officer with the Post Office Savings Bank, at Hammersmith. In the mid-1920s she transferred to their new publicity unit, spending the rest of her career there designing posters and other promotional material. She also designed the bank's annual Christmas card for members of the royal family.

In 1950 Ratcliffe scribed and illuminated, in gold, a 'Book of Acknowledgement', for the Benenden Civil Service Chest Hospital's Appeal Fund. The book was presented to Queen Elizabeth on 6 July 1950, when she opened the hospital. She also lettered two books of remembrance for St Mark's Church, Surbiton.

She exhibited at two Royal Academy of Arts summer exhibitions and was appointed a Fellow of the Society of Scribes and Illuminators (FSSI).

For most of her life, Ratcliffe lived alone in a flat in West Kensington, London, before retiring to a cottage at 1, Mill Street, Loose, Kent in 1959. In retirement, she joined and exhibited with the Maidstone Art Society, served as life vice-president of the Civil Service Arts Club, and acted as art tutor to local children.

Ratcliffe died on 19 October 1988. Her funeral took place at All Saints' Church, Loose. Examples of her work are in the collections of the Imperial War Museums, The Postal Museum, The National Archives, and Maidstone Museum & Art Gallery.

Maidstone Art Society award a Mildred Ratcliffe Prize for 'Best in Show' at their annual exhibition.
