= Irene Wellington =

British calligrapher and teacher

- Born: Irene Bass; 29 October 1904; Lydd, Kent, England
- Died: 18 September 1984; Reigate, Surrey, England
- Education: Royal College of Art
- Known for: Calligraphy
- Notable work: The Accession Address (1952), commissioned by the London County Council and presented to Queen Elizabeth II; The Coronation Address (1953), commissioned by the London County Council and presented to Queen Elizabeth II
- Spouses: Ernest John Sutton; Hubert Wellington

Irene Bass Sutton Wellington (1904–1984) was an influential British calligrapher and teacher of calligraphy.

== Early life ==
Born in Lydd, Kent, in 1904, Irene Bass attended Ashford County School, and later Maidstone School of Art, where she began her study of calligraphy in 1921. She was influenced by Edward Johnston's book, Writing & Illuminating & Lettering (1906). In 1925 she won a Royal Exhibition scholarship to the Royal College of Art, where Johnston taught, and earned a diploma with a specialty in calligraphy. She was his assistant at the Royal College of Art in 1928.

Johnson in 1944 towards the end of his life asked Wellington to visit Ditchling to assist and ultimately complete a commission he'd received from Sir Winston Churchill who wanted to give Harry Hopkins, President Roosevelt's personal representative a few lines of Shakespeare's Macbeth written out on vellum, in memory of his son who had been killed in WWII

== Career ==
In 1929, Irene Bass was elected a Craft Member of the Society of Scribes and Illuminators. In 1930, she married her cousin, Ernest John Sutton, and moved to Edinburgh. Shortly thereafter, she began work on her first major commission, "The Oxfordshire and Buckinghamshire Light Infantry Roll of Honour for the First World War." Edward Johnston recommended Irene Sutton as an instructor to Hubert Wellington, the principal of the Edinburgh College of Art. She taught there from 1932 to 1943; one of her students at Edinburgh was Tom Gourdie. Her marriage to Jack Sutton was annulled in September 1944, allowing her to marry Hubert Wellington a few months later. She moved with him to Henley-on-Thames, Oxfordshire.

Irene Wellington then began the most significant phase of her career, undertaking major commissions and teaching for the Central School of Arts and Crafts in London from 1944 to 1959. Among her students, there were Donald Jackson and Ann Hechle. Although she produced a large body of work for private clients and personal acquaintances during this period, she also received several significant public commissions. Her last major public commission was "The Bailiffs of Lydd," which she produced to honor the guildhall of Lydd, her birthplace. Although she published little during her lifetime, her copybooks have been widely used in calligraphy instruction.

She died in 1984.

The Irene Wellington Educational Trust supports the "advancement of the education of the public in the arts of calligraphy and fine lettering" through grants to individuals and organizations.

== Significant commissions ==
- The Oxfordshire and Buckinghamshire Light Infantry Roll of Honour for the First World War (1930–31)
- The Wykehamist Roll of Honour (1948)
- The Oxfordshire and Buckinghamshire Light Infantry Roll of Honour for the Second World War (1948–50)
- The Accession Address (1952), commissioned by the London County Council and presented to Queen Elizabeth II
- The Coronation Address (1953), commissioned by the London County Council and presented to Queen Elizabeth II
- The Bailiffs of Lydd (1972–73), commissioned by the Borough of Lydd, Kent for Lydd Guildhall
