= Book of Remembrance for Those Who Fell for Ukraine =

Ukrainian digital book of remembrance

- Available in: Ukrainian
- Website: memorybook.org.ua
- Commercial: No
- Launched: 22 July 2014
- Current status: Active

The Book of Remembrance for Those Who Fell for Ukraine (Ukrainian: Книга пам'яті полеглих за Україну, romanized: Knyha pamiati polehlykh za Ukrainu), or simply the Book of Remembrance, is a Ukrainian non-governmental website and digital book of remembrance dedicated to documenting, accounting for, and organizing data on the losses of Ukrainian military personnel in the Russo-Ukrainian War. It keeps records of the losses of all security forces and includes information about the burials of temporarily unidentified deceased. The site operates in close cooperation with the National Military History Museum of Ukraine.

In 2015, according to a publication on the Ministry of Defense's website, the Book of Remembrance had the most comprehensive dataset on fallen Ukrainian soldiers and fighters from volunteer battalions since the beginning of the hostilities.

== History ==
The website was founded on July 22, 2014, with the support of the National Military History Museum of Ukraine. The authors include founder and editor Maksym Popov, Yaroslav Tynchenko, Herman Shapovalenko, Serhiy Kovalenko, and Svetlana Vihovska.

According to Yaroslav Tynchenko, with the onset of hostilities, the Military History Museum began communicating with military units and officers to collect data on the deceased. Initially, there were issues with the command base because the system of orders and military statutes did not align with the reality of the situation—Ukraine was not prepared for war, and thus, there were no provisions for recording casualties, especially those occurring outside Ukrainian territory. Unable to use the existing system, the museum had to establish private contacts with the Ministry of Internal Affairs, the National Guard, and the State Border Guard Service of Ukraine.

From May to June 2014, when losses were few, the museum managed the records, but by July, with approximately 300 deaths, it became clear that the volume of information could not be processed quickly enough. At this point, Tynchenko learned about Maksym Popov, who was developing a similar website. Tynchenko and several museum employees then took on the task of populating the site with information.

Significant problems are associated with the accounting of losses and official reports. Press centres for the Anti-Terrorist Operation and Ministry of Defense only report the number of fallen servicemen of the Ukrainian Armed Forces, excluding National Guardsmen, volunteers, or similar. Another issue is that official sources only report deaths when a body is found. Others are considered missing until their body is found and identified, but these deaths do not appear in daily or weekly reports, however, all names are published on the Book of Remembrance website.

As of June 2015, 2,080 individuals who died before 21 February 2015 were documented.

By 2015, according to an interview with Yaroslav Tynchenko, the team operating the website worked entirely voluntarily, without external funding.

On 14 July 2019, Facebook administrators blocked the group's Facebook page. Prior to the block, the page operators had been warned that the content of some of their posts violated Facebook community standards. The ban was the consequence of posts about the deaths of members of the Azov Brigade in Donbas, which, following reports and complaints from anti-Ukrainian users, Facebook administrators mistakenly regarded as Nazism propaganda, a common talking point in Russian disinformation to justify the invasion of Ukraine. On the same day, the personal account of one of the project's volunteers, Svetlana Vihovska, was also blocked.

== Description ==
The Book of Remembrance documents the losses of all units of the Ukrainian law enforcement agencies, as well as irregular volunteer formations.

The site did not initially publish information about servicemen who committed suicide; however, as of 2017, this approach has been revised, indicating the cause of death in such cases as a "tragic situation."

A separate section provides data on the burial of temporarily unidentified deceased at three cemeteries—Kushuhum, Krasnopil, and Starobilsk—which are updated as the identification process progresses.

== Impact ==
In March 2015, according to the Ministry of Defense's website, the Book of Remembrance website had the most comprehensive dataset on the deceased Ukrainian soldiers and volunteers starting from the beginning of hostilities.
