= Mary White (ceramicist and calligrapher) =

Welsh ceramicist, calligrapher (born 1964)

Mary White née Rollinson (1926–2013) was a ceramic artist and calligrapher.

== Biography ==
Lettering on Ceramics

White was born in 1926 in Croesyceiliog, Wales. From 1949 to 1950 she studied at Goldsmiths' College and in 1951 she married the painter Charles White (d.1997). She was made a fellow of the Society of Scribes & Illuminators (SSI) in 1962 and later the Letter Exchange.

During the early 1970s White taught at Atlantic College, Glamorgan. After teaching for twenty years in grammar schools, art colleges and Atlantic College, White gave up teaching in 1973 to work freelance.

In 1975 White was invited to take part in an international symposium in Cardiff and had the opportunity to experiment with porcelain. She developed wide-flanged bowls, extending the thin rims to breaking point. She also found the possibilities of using colours in glazes instead of the more usual warm browns that she had been using for tableware. This marked a great change in her work. Turquoise became her favourite colour, at first pure, and then with subtle variations. She began to make more individual pieces and by the time she and her husband moved to Germany in 1980 she rarely made tableware. In 1982 she was awarded the Staatspreis Rheinland-Pfalz for outstanding craftwork.

Before the move to Germany, White had occasionally exhibited calligraphy with the SSI and had used letters on bowls, mainly painted in lustres. In Germany she could not find a market for these and at that time had no contact with German calligraphers, so for many years she concentrated on ceramics. In the early 1980s White began to make organic forms in porcelain, partly hand built. She used the clay as thin as possible, almost like torn paper and assembled it in layers. Ideas come from the layers of rock on the seashore, shells and waves rippling over the sand and colours in the sea and sky. She preferred to make shapes that were more oval rather than round. In 1990 she became involved with calligraphy again and attended an International symposium in Belgium. Under the influence of a master calligrapher, Villu Toots from Estonia, she regained her enthusiasm for calligraphy and experimented with combining the two artforms.

Her work is collected internationally and appears in museum collections, including the Victoria and Albert Museum, London and the Musée des Arts Décoratifs, Paris.

She died in Germany in 2013.

== Published works ==
Lettering on Ceramics, 2003, reviewed in
