= Lydd Guildhall =

Municipal building in Lydd, Kent, England

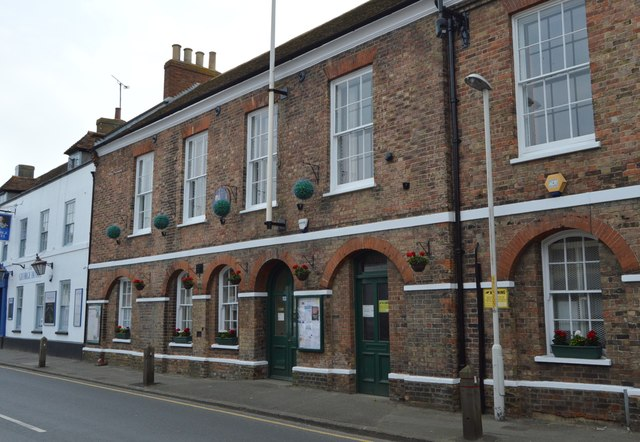
- Lydd Guildhall

- Shown in Kent
- 50.9512°N 0.9054°E
- Location: High Street, Lydd

History
- Built: 1792

Site notes
- Architectural style: Neoclassical style

Listed Building – Grade II
- Official name: The Guild Hall
- Designated: 28 November 1950
- Reference no.: 1338208

Lydd Guildhall, also known as Lydd Town Hall and the Lydd Common House, is a municipal building in the High Street, Lydd, Kent, England. The structure, which accommodates the offices and meeting place of Lydd Town Council, is a Grade II listed building.

== History ==
The building was designed in the neoclassical style, built in red brick and was completed in around 1792. Re-faced in the early 19th century, it featured six openings on the ground floor, all flanked by pilasters supporting brick voussoirs. The first floor was fenestrated by five sash windows and surmounted by a cornice with a tiled roof above. Internally, the principal rooms were a market hall on the ground floor, an assembly room on the first floor and a series of prison cells in the basement. From 1830, the prison cells were only used as a temporary lock-up for petty criminals.

The building was a regular venue for coroners' court hearings: these hearings included the inquest into the deaths of 293 people who drowned, when the full-rigged ship, Northfleet, sank in the English Channel in January 1873.

The borough council, which had met in the council chamber, was reformed under the Municipal Corporations Act 1883. Fund raising events held in the guildhall included a function in support of Salute the Soldier Week in March 1944 during the Second World War. A colourful piece of calligraphy by Irene Wellington, listing all the bailiffs of the borough since ancient times, was installed in the guildhall in 1973.

The building continued to serve as the meeting place of the borough council for much of the 20th century, but ceased to be local seat of government when the enlarged Folkestone and Hythe District Council was formed in 1974. However, it subsequently became the meeting place of Lydd Town Council.
