= Louisa Puller =

English painter (1884-1964)

Louisa Puller (1884–1964) was a British artist who contributed works to both the Recording Britain scheme and to the War Artists' Advisory Committee during the Second World War.

== Early life and education ==
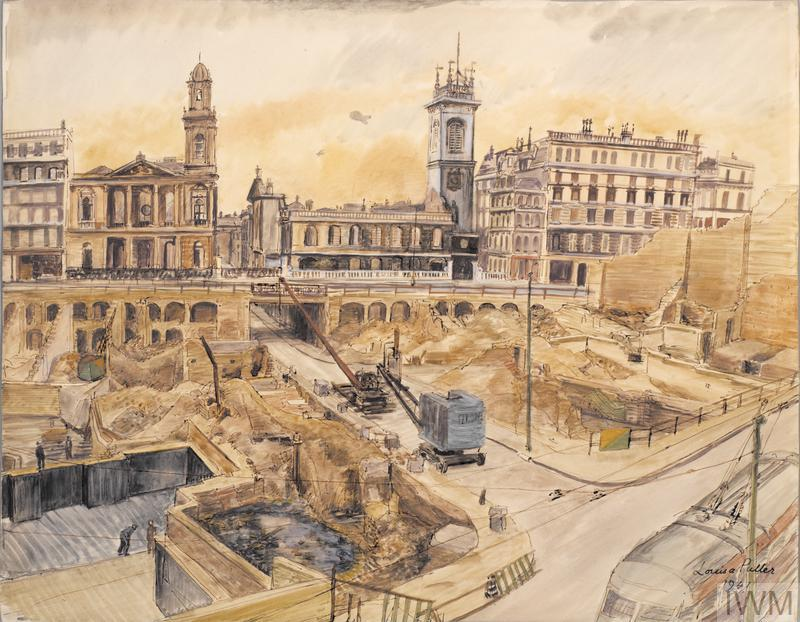
Holborn Viaduct and the City Temple, London (Art.IWM ART LD 1691) (1941)

Puller was the daughter of Charles and Emmeline Giles-Puller. In 1897, she won a prize for a Study of a Tree at the Hertfordshire Arts Society exhibition; she gave her address as Youngsbury, Ware. She studied mathematics at Girton College, Cambridge, graduating with a BA in 1907. Puller was active in the suffrage movement, being secretary of the East Hertfordshire National Union of Women's Suffrage Societies. During World War I, she worked as a land girl, and gave talks on the subject of women working on farms.

== Artistic career ==
Puller appears to have been an amateur artist, with no record of having a professional artistic career. She was a member of the Society of Scribes & Illuminators, and was appointed honorary secretary when the society was founded in 1921. In 1926, she designed a number of panels for an illustrated, limited edition book about Wilthamstow and Highham, and also did the calligraphy and illuminations for a story by Cecil Headlam that was published in the Christmas edition of The Sphere. In 1940, Puller had one work shown in a Royal Academy exhibition; the painting, "Winter Landscape", was among those that were also exhibited in Eastbourne, where it was described as "of outstanding merit." In 1947, she held an exhibition of watercolours, mostly views of Derbyshire, at the Derby Art Gallery. In 1950, she had work in an annual show of the Royal Society of British Artists.

Puller travelled widely throughout England during World War Two on behalf of the Recording Britain project of war artists, depicting the impact of war in at least nine different counties; she was among the most prolific artists employed by the scheme. In a review of the second exhibition of Recording Britain at the National Gallery in 1942, she was described as a "new discovery". For Recording Britain, Puller was sent at short notice to the village of Sudbourne in Suffolk, arriving just hours before it was appropriated for tank training by the British Army and the local population departed. Her other contributions included six studies of Tetbury in Gloucestershire. The War Artists' Advisory Committee, WAAC, purchased two watercolours by Puller of bomb damage in the City of London.

Puller's watercolours were included in travelling exhibitions of the Recording Britain project in the 1940s, 1980s and 1990s. They were also reproduced in books of the Recording Britain project published in the 1940s, 1990 and in 2011.

== Collections ==
Most of her work for Recording Britain is now part of the collection of the Victoria & Albert Museum, while the Imperial War Museum holds the paintings purchased from her by WAAC. Other works are held by the Potteries Museum & Art Gallery, Hanley (a watercolour of Bethesda Chapel and the Bell Pottery bottle kilns which formerly stood on the site of the museum), and the Athelstan Museum, Malmesbury.

== Death ==
In March 1964, Puller died at her home in Chelsea of coal gas poisoning due to inadequate ventilation.
