= St Andrew's Church, Surbiton =

St Andrew's
- St Andrew's Church, Surbiton
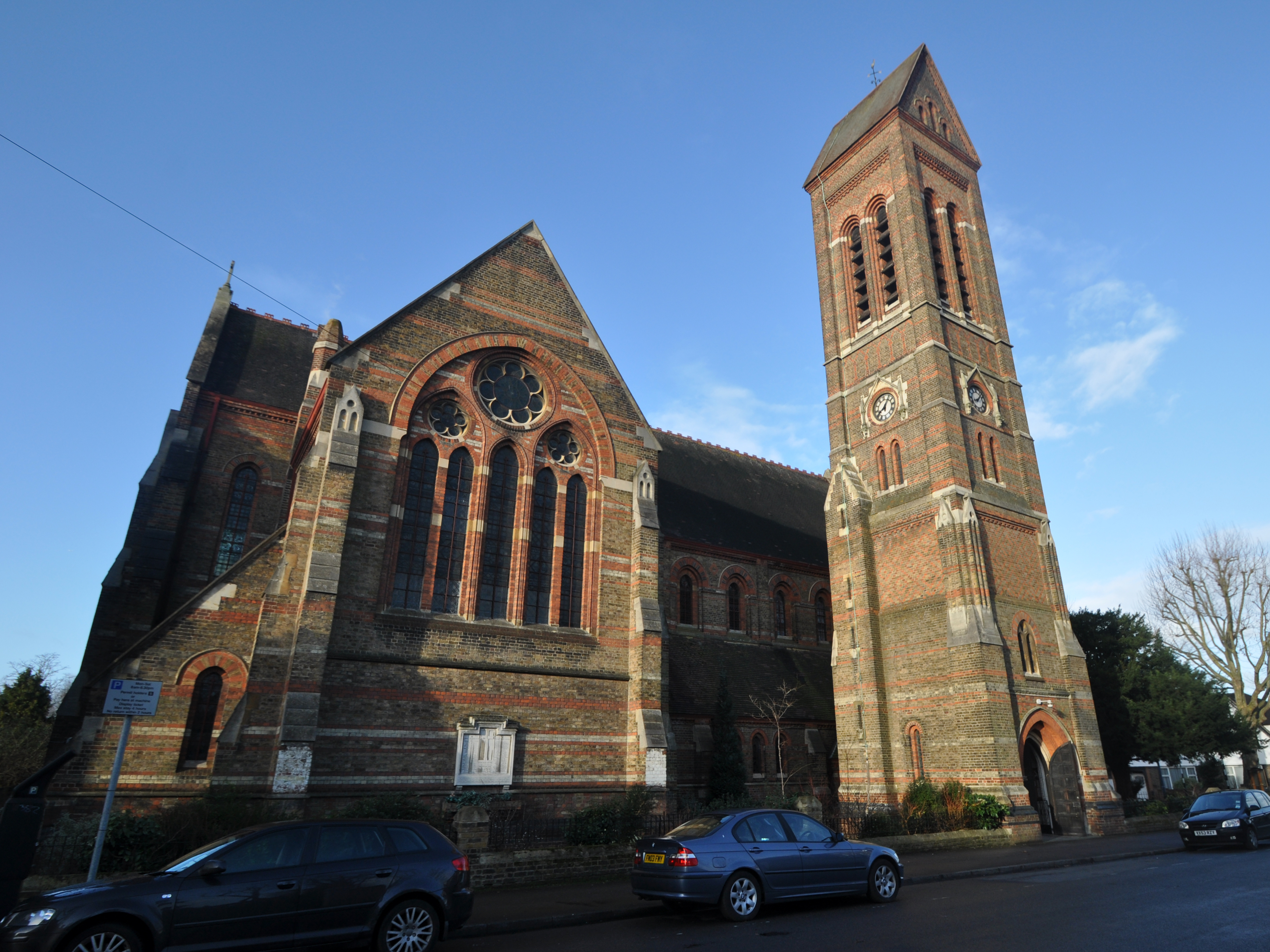
- St Andrew's
- 51.3933°N 0.3088°W
- Country: England
- Denomination: Anglican
- Website: St. Andrew's Church

Architecture
- Style: Gothic

Administration
- Diocese: Southwark
- Archdeaconry: Wandsworth
- Deanery: Kingston
- Parish: Surbiton

Clergy
- Vicar: Rev'd Robert Stanier

Listed Building – Grade II
- Designated: 6 October 1983
- Reference no.: 1080050

St Andrew's Church, Surbiton, is one of two Church of England parish churches in Surbiton, London – the other is St Mark's. It is dedicated to Saint Andrew, and is situated at the junction of St Andrew's Road and Maple Road.

== History ==
The church was built in 1871–72 by Sir Arthur Blomfield, at a cost of £6,602, and consecrated in 1872. The money was put up by Angela Burdett-Coutts, of Coutts Bank. It was listed grade II, entry 1080050, in 1983. The stained glass above the chancel and both in and above the baptistry was designed and produced by Lavers, Barraud and Westlake; the other stained glass is later.

The tower was added in the early 20th century, at a cost of £1,400, as a gift of thanks to the then Prince of Wales (later King Edward VII) following his recovery from an illness. In 2009 Saint Andrew's underwent restoration.

== Gallery ==
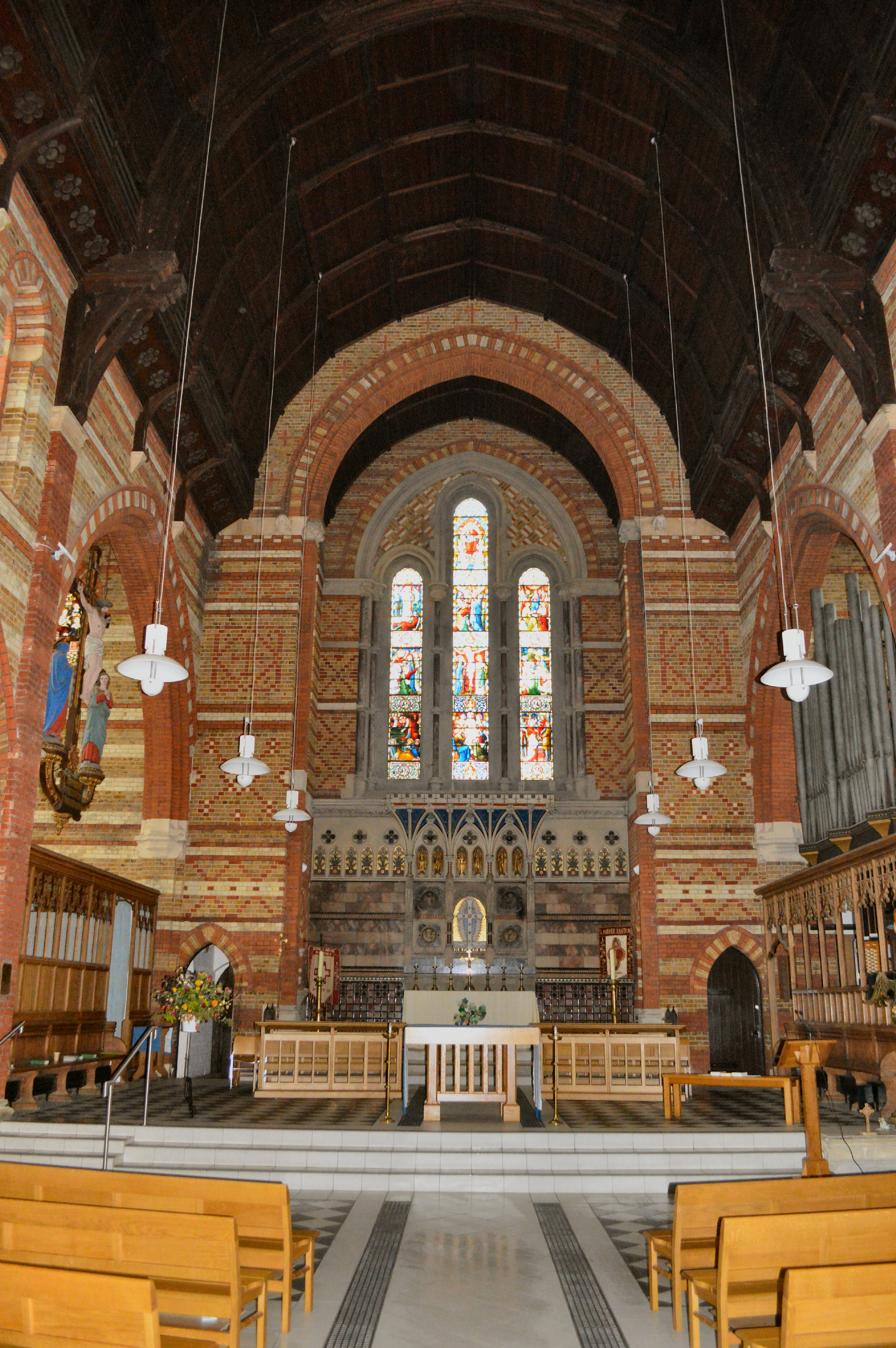
The Nave

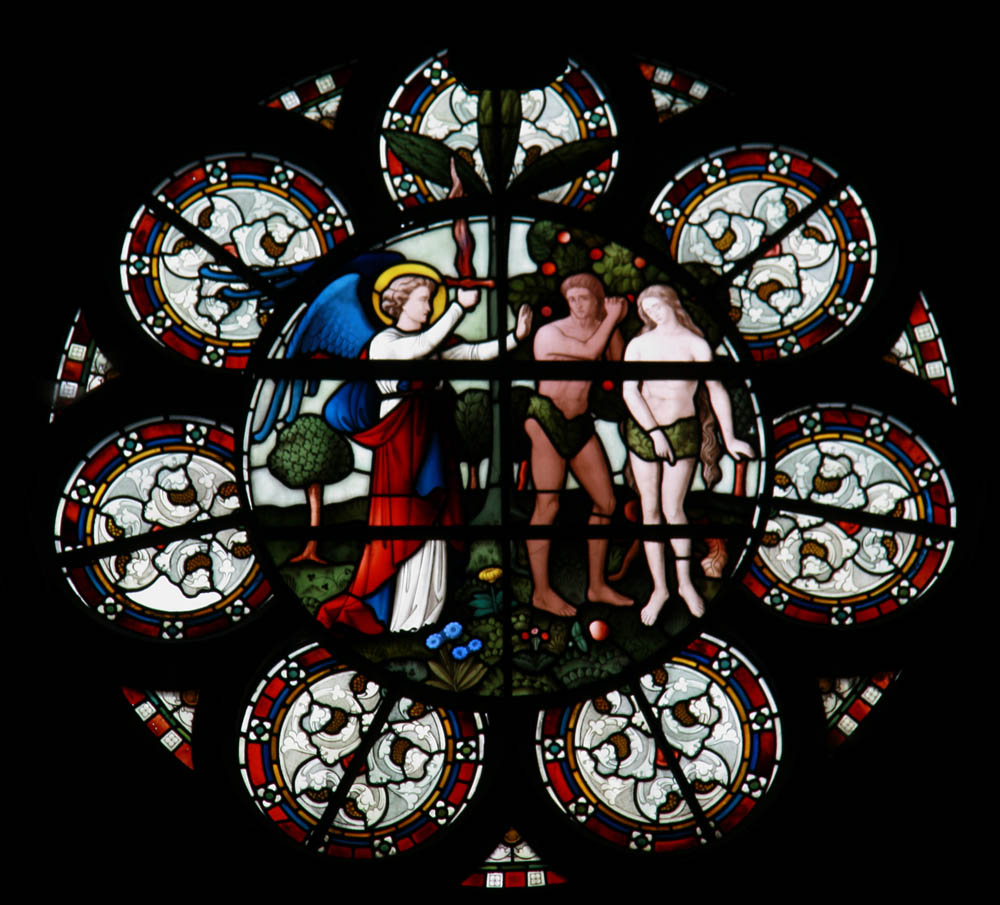
Rose Window

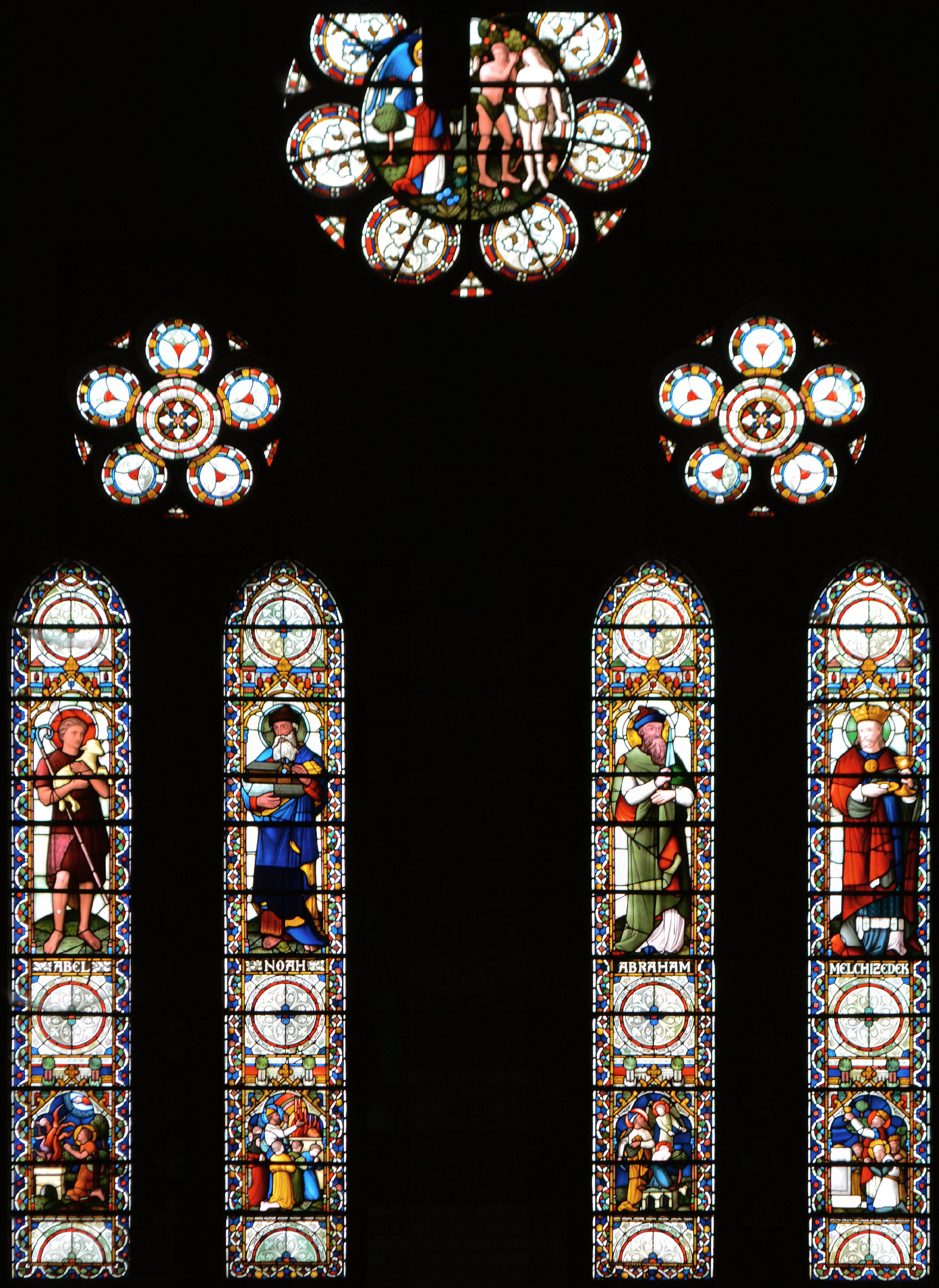
West window
