= Villu Toots =

Estonian calligrapher and illustrator

- Born: August 24, 1916; Reval, Russian Empire
- Died: April 10, 1993 (aged 76); Tallinn, Estonia

Villu Toots (August 24, 1916 – April 10, 1993) was an internationally known Estonian calligrapher, book designer, educator, palaeographer and author.

== Biography ==
=== Early life ===
Villu Toots was born on August 24, 1916, in Reval, Russian Empire (now Tallinn, Estonia). He was the first child of Karl Johannes and Amalie Toots (née Jaas). The family was originally from Tartu and moved back home, when Toots was one and a half years old. His father was a shoemaker and his mother was a housewife, but earned money as a seamstress.

Toots started school at Tartu Commercial School. Luckily for him, the curriculum also included penmanship. There Toots gained his first knowledge about formal and casual scripts from artist Eduard Ahas. He also got advice from Hando Mugasto, who was an artist from the prestigious Pallas Art School. By his senior year in 1934 Toots had started making posters for the school and for others.

=== Career beginnings ===
Right after high school the professional career of Villu Toots had begun. He started as an artist for local cinemas in Tartu. He managed to work for five different establishments: Capitol, Heli, Apollo, Central and Metropol. With the help of his personal assistant he created posters, newspaper ads and visuals for intermissions. Simultaneously he was doing designs for other companies, exhibitions and display windows. He spent the hard-earned money on field trips to European art centers at the time: France, Austria, Hungary, Germany and Poland.

Toots' atelier was located in cinema Apollo, that was close to Pallas Art School. Joining the academy had been a dream of his until September 1937, when he started his studies there.

=== Studies in Pallas ===
Toots had a unique opportunity to study with and from some of the greats of Estonian fine art. He practiced printmaking under the guidance of Arkadio Laigo and Roman Vaher. R. Vaher had studied in Hochschule für Grafik und Buchkunst Leipzig. He established a close connection with Toots, as he was also interested in calligraphy. Toots' teachers also included Aleksander Vardi and Kaarel Liimand. Toots left Pallas before graduating in 1939.

=== Moving to Tallinn ===
During the last year of World War II in 1945 Villu Toots moved to Tallinn to focus more on book design. The best printing house in Tartu had been destroyed by the war, therefore publishing had been moved to the capital. For seven years Toots worked as an art director in two publishing houses. There he learned more about different printing methods and book architecture, but also about the restrictions of the soviet regime. For two years he was the leading designer of Eesti Naine (Estonian Woman) magazine. From 1952 until his death, Toots worked as a freelance artist. The only exception was in 1965–1966, when he worked as an art director in the National Committee of Cinematography.

=== Calligraphy School ===
Since 1946 Villu Toots had been teaching calligraphy in different seminars. Calligraphy had suddenly become more popular and there was a need for a thorough form of study. Also the Tallinn State Applied Art Institute of the ESSR could not fulfil the demand for artistic writing. In 1965 Toots established a calligraphy school named Kirjakunsti Kool with a three-year course. Students came from all over Estonia and applications were sent from far ends of the Soviet Union. Toots was the initiator, the head and only teacher in the one-man school. Studies took place in the evenings.

In 1986 Toots gave his position to Heino Kivihall – one of his best students. As of 2015 Heino Kivihall is still teaching calligraphy in the same institution also in the Tallinn School of Calligraphy. Other well-known students of Kirjakunsti Kool also include Villu Järmut, Ilmar Vallikivi, Henno Käo, Emil Lausmäe, Rein Maantoa, Arvo Pärenson, Ain Kaasik and many others.

== Publications ==
One of his greatest contributions to the Estonian culture are his books on calligraphy and type design, that also give insight to the history of writing, different scripts and typefaces. His book "Tänapäeva kiri" (1956) was adapted and remade for Latvian readers as "300 burtu veidi. 300 шрифтов" (1960) and for Russians as "Cовременный шрифт" (1966). He has also published collections of his best calligraphy works. American calligraphy magazine Scribe dedicated their issue of winter 1978 and spring 1979 to the works of Villu Toots.

Books

- "Õpime plakatkirja. Algteadmisi kirjakunstist" (Tallinn 1949)
- "Tänapäeva kiri" (Tallinn 1956)
- "300 burtu veidi. 300 шрифтов" (Riga 1960)
- "Cовременный шрифт" (Moscow 1966)
- "Kirjakunsti abc. Laisulekirjad" (Tallinn 1968)
- "Kirjakunsti abc. Grotesk ehk plokk-kiri" (Tallinn 1972)
- "Eesti kirjakunst 1940–1970" (Tallinn 1973)
- "Kiri kui kunst" (Tallinn 1981)
- "Kiri Eesti kultuuriloos" (compiled by Rein Loodus; Tallinn 2002)

Collections of calligraphical works

- "Kalligraafilisi etüüde. Calligraphical studies." (Tallinn 1976)
- "50 eksliibrist" (Tallinn 1979)
- "Sule ja pintsli duett" (Tallinn 1985)
- "Paraaf" (Tallinn 1987)
- "Calligraphical spirals" (Gothenburg; Tampere 1989)
- "Calligraphic Bookplates and Monograms" (San Juan Capistrano, CA 1992)

== Distant acquaintances ==
Despite living behind the Iron Curtain Villu Toots was able to keep in touch with notable people all over the world. He had connections in almost 30 different countries, including Australia, Brazil, Hong Kong, Iceland and Japan.

First distant acquaintances were colleagues from Moscow: Solomon Telingater, Vadim Lazurski, Pavel Kuzanyan and Maxim Shukow. Contacting outside of the Soviet Union started in 1954 with a calligrapher from Bruges, Jef Boudens, who was seeking help for writing books. German typographer Albert Kapr turned to Toots with a similar request. Through Kapr Toots became friends with Hermann Zapf, one of the leading typographers in the world. Villu Toots also kept friendly ties with Donald Jackson, official scribe and calligrapher to the Crown Office of United Kingdom of Great Britain and Northern Ireland.

== Personal ==
Villu Toots married Ann Leesalu on January 18, 1941. They have a daughter Tiiu Sarv. In 1991 the couple celebrated their golden wedding anniversary. Villu Toots died on April 10, 1993. He is buried at Tallinn's Metsakalmistu cemetery.

== See also ==
- Mary White (ceramicist and calligrapher), influenced by Toots
