= Anthony Wood (artist) =

English heraldic artist (1925–2022)

Anthony Wood FSHA, FSSI
- Born: 5 October 1925; Edgbaston, Birmingham, England
- Died: 16 February 2022 (aged 96)

Anthony Wood, FSHA, FSSI (5 October 1925 – 16 February 2022) was a British heraldic artist and a master of heraldry.

== Biography ==
Wood was born in the Edgbaston district of Birmingham on 5 October 1925. In 1943, Wood graduated from Oundle School. From 1943 to 1945 he continued his education at the Birmingham College of Art. After graduation he trained as a professional calligrapher, illuminator and heraldic artist. He painted heraldry for various Officers at the College of Arms for many years.

From 1965 to 1986 Wood taught the subjects at Ealing Art College and Wimbledon Schools of Art. In 1968, he founded a full-time three-year Diploma course in calligraphy, heraldry, and manuscript illumination at the Reigate School of Art and Design. For many years it was the only course of its type in the world. Wood directed it as a Senior Lecturer for 19 years until 1987. He has been responsible for the training of many professional heraldic artists who achieved mastery in the profession. In August 1996, he attended the 22nd International Congress of Genealogical and Heraldic Sciences in Ottawa, Ontario, Canada, as an artist delegate by invitation of the Canadian Heraldic Authority. The Congress, for the first time held outside of Europe, was considered to be a "historic meeting" for scientists and artists pursuing Heraldry in Modern Times.

Wood was invited to attend the 23rd International Congress of Genealogical and Heraldic Sciences in Turin, Italy, in September 1998, where he presented a paper on Heraldic Art and Design.

Wood committed to teach his students a wide variety of techniques ranging from medieval to modern styles of calligraphy and illumination done mainly on calf and goatskin vellum, in gouache colors and precious metals, continued to work over the past half century to private commissions for clients from all over the world. His armorial art produced for the House of Lords, the House of Commons and the Craft and Merchant Guilds of the city of London, commissioned by local authorities, schools, universities, and private collectors is recognizable for the high complexity of composition, rich detail, and created almost 3-D visual effect.

Wood died on 16 February 2022, at the age of 96.

== Publications ==
Wood is a co-author of A European Armorial.

Samples of his art were included in The Art of Heraldry by Carl-Alexander von Volborth, published in 1987.

A Dictionary of Heraldry (1987)—edited by Stephan Friar and illustrated by Anthony Wood along with John Ferguson (artist), became highly recommended as an introduction to heraldry. The Arms of the Lord Francis Lovel and The Arms of the Worshipful Company of Fletchers painted by Wood were reproduced distinctively on front and back covers of the volume.

Wood wrote numerous articles on heraldic art and craft. He contributed an essay entitled "The Art of Heraldry" and a painting of John Brooke-Little's coat of arms to the book Tribute to an Armourist, published in 2000 by The Heraldry Society in London, to commemorate Brooke-Little's lifelong service.

In 1996, Wood published a book titled Heraldic Art and Design.

== Distinctions and other work ==
In 1995, Wood was made a Freeman of the City of London. From 1980 to 1982 and from 1983 to 1984, he was Master of the Worshipful Company of Bowyers (longbow makers) of London, which is one of the Medieval Craft Guilds of the city.
