= Society of Scribes & Illuminators =

Calligraphy organization

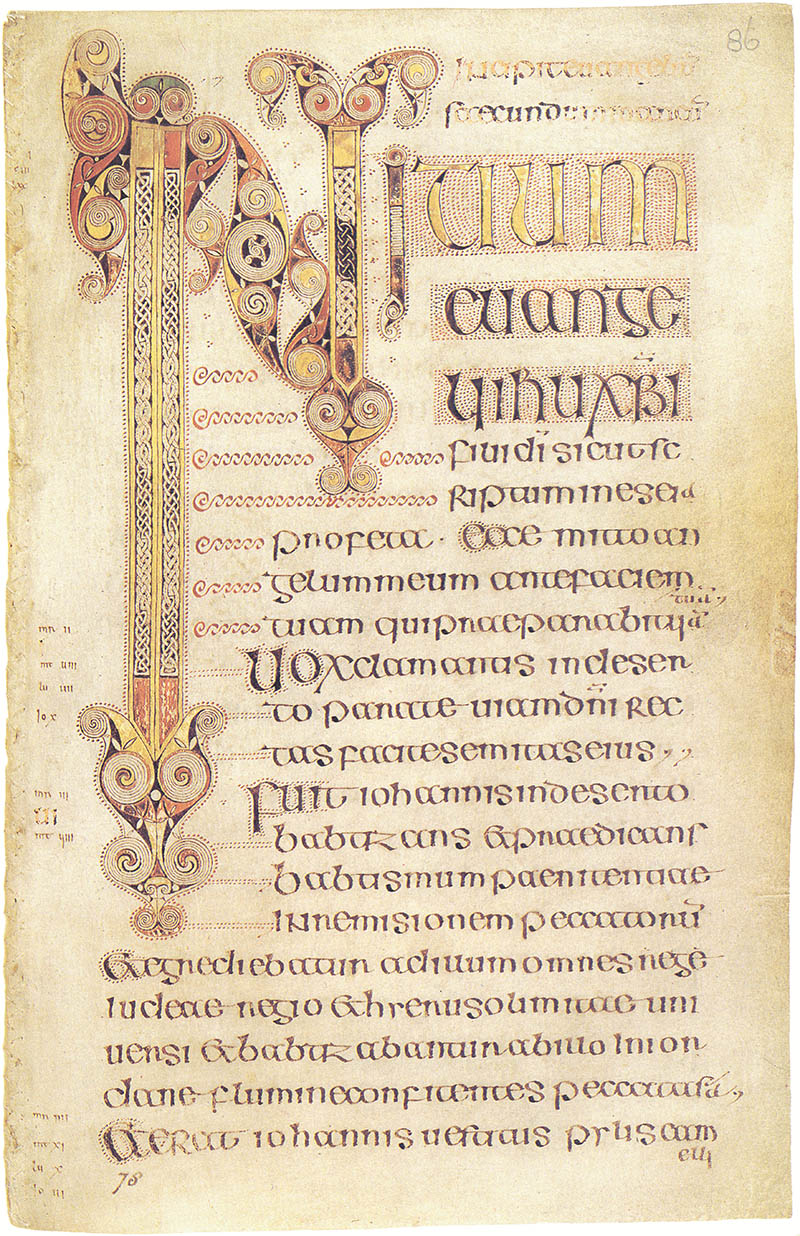
Illuminated page from the Book of Durrow

The Society of Scribes & Illuminators is an organisation dedicated to the promotion and development of the arts of calligraphy and illumination. It organises exhibitions and lectures on subjects related to its fields of interest.

The SSI was founded in the United Kingdom in 1921 by former students of leading calligrapher Edward Johnston. It initially had 50 members; in 1925, three quarters of the members were women. Membership is opened to professionals in the field as well as interested amateurs.

The Society held its first exhibition in 1922 at the Brook Street Art Gallery, and a display of members' work was included in the British Empire Exhibition in 1924.

Members who have reached a particularly high standard of work may be elected as Fellows of the Society, and are entitled (provided their subscription has not lapsed) to use the post-nominal FSSI.

== Notable members and Fellows ==
- Tom Gourdie
- Thomas Ingmire
- Donald Jackson (calligrapher)
- Dorothy Miner
- Brody Neuenschwander
- Timothy Noad MBE
- Charles Pearce
- Louisa Puller
- Mildred Ratcliffe
- Ieuan Rees
- Sheila Waters
- Irene Wellington
- Mary White
- Anthony Wood

== See also ==
- Scribe
