= Tom Gourdie =

Scottish artist

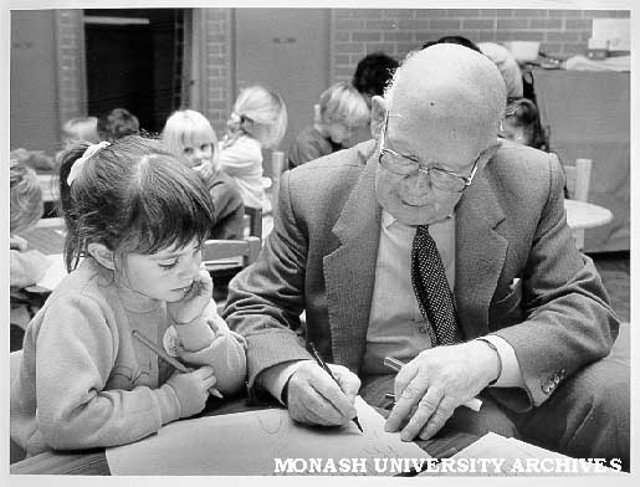
- Tom Gourdie at Monash University, giving a guest class to exceptional children. Photographer Richard Crompton, 1985
- Born: 18 May 1913; Cowdenbeath
- Died: 6 January 2005 (aged 91)
- Education: Edinburgh College of Art
- Known for: Painting, calligraphy

Tom Gourdie MBE, DA, FSSI (18 May 1913 – 6 January 2005) was a prominent Scottish calligrapher, artist and teacher. He also was the author of several books, mainly on subject matter related to calligraphy.

== Early life and initiation into calligraphy ==
Gourdie was born in Cowdenbeath and attended Cowdenbeath High School. His father was a coal miner in Fife. In his teens Gourdie left school to work but returned and gained a scholarship to the Edinburgh College of Art, where he studied between 1932 and 1937. In 1937 he won a scholarship of fifty pounds to travel in Germany. Visiting Nuremberg in kilts, he and a friend were informed by some uniformed soldiers that their leader would like to meet the men in tartans, and they met Adolf Hitler.

Gourdie returned to the art college, where he received instruction in calligraphy from Irene Wellington. He developed a deep interest in the history of writing and its various forms, alphabets and styles.

During World War II, Gourdie joined the Royal Air Force and worked on camouflage and on three-dimensional maps used in preparing troops for landings in Sicily and northern France. The War Artists' Advisory Committee also purchased two paintings from him during the conflict, which are now held by the Imperial War Museum.

== Teaching career ==
After he was demobilised Gourdie took his teaching diploma and taught art at Banff Academy in 1946–47. He then returned to Fife as an art teacher at Kirkcaldy High School, where he remained till 1973, after which he retired early from his school teaching career in order to give more attention to calligraphy and to the national and international promotion of the teaching of handwriting.

In his later life Gourdie gained recognition throughout Britain as an expert calligrapher. His stated ambition was to improve the nation's handwriting, both that of children and of adults. He remained active in his field until his death in Kirkcaldy at the age of 91, coaching his nurses and carers in how to hold a pen. He visited schools, instructing children and teachers "to write in a simple, practical, calligraphic style". At the time he died children in Fife were being taught a script that he had based on a 1998 design, but he expressed disappointment that it had not been adopted throughout Scotland.

== Activities in art teaching ==
During his career as an art master in Fife and painted some much admired water colours of the area around Kirkcaldy and of the Kirkcaldy street life of the day. His subject matter was mainly the Fife environs, in particular the coalfields, many of them since shut down. His intricate representation of the atmosphere of the region at that attracted the attention of the National Coal Board, and they bought all that were available.

== Advocacy and writing ==
Building on his growing reputation as a calligrapher, Gourdie argued that technological advances did not eliminate the need for handwriting. He wrote prolifically and introduced the italic script widely to European schools. Kay Dick of Glasgow collaborated with him on many projects.

In the Seventies, Gourdie became a prolific author and his book Italic Handwriting is popular with calligraphers. Other books followed and established him as a leading authority. He toured widely, lecturing in the United States, Sweden and South Africa. The Society for Italic Handwriting made him a life member - the scroll being presented by their president, Humphrey Lyttelton. For his services to calligraphy he was made an MBE in 1959. He was aged 46 at the time, which was unusually young for the honour.

== Private life ==
Gourdie was remembered by those who knew him as an entertaining man within exacting, but generous nature, and a lively sense of humor. He also enjoyed music, collected recordings, and played the trombone and French horn.

Gourdie survived his wife, Lilias, and was survived in turn by their son, Tom, and daughter, Alison.

== Representative works ==
- A Guide to Better Handwriting 1967
- Calligraphic Styles 1979
- Calligraphy for the Beginner 1982
- Fun and Games 1981
- Gothic Scripts 1987
- Handwriting for Today 1971
- I Can Write (with Delia Atkinson)
- Improve Your Handwriting 1975
- Italic Handwriting 1974
- Learning to Write 1981
- Mastering Calligraphy 1984
- Pattern Making for Schools 1959
- Practice in Handwriting (reproducible worksheets) 1979
- Simple Modern Hand Kay Dick and Tom Gourdie 1991
- The Ladybird Book of Handwriting 1968
- The Puffin Book of Handwriting 1980
- The Sonnets of Shakespeare (calligraphy by Tom Gourdie) 1988
- Tom Gourdie's Basic Calligraphic Hands 1984
