= Condolence book =

Funeral custom

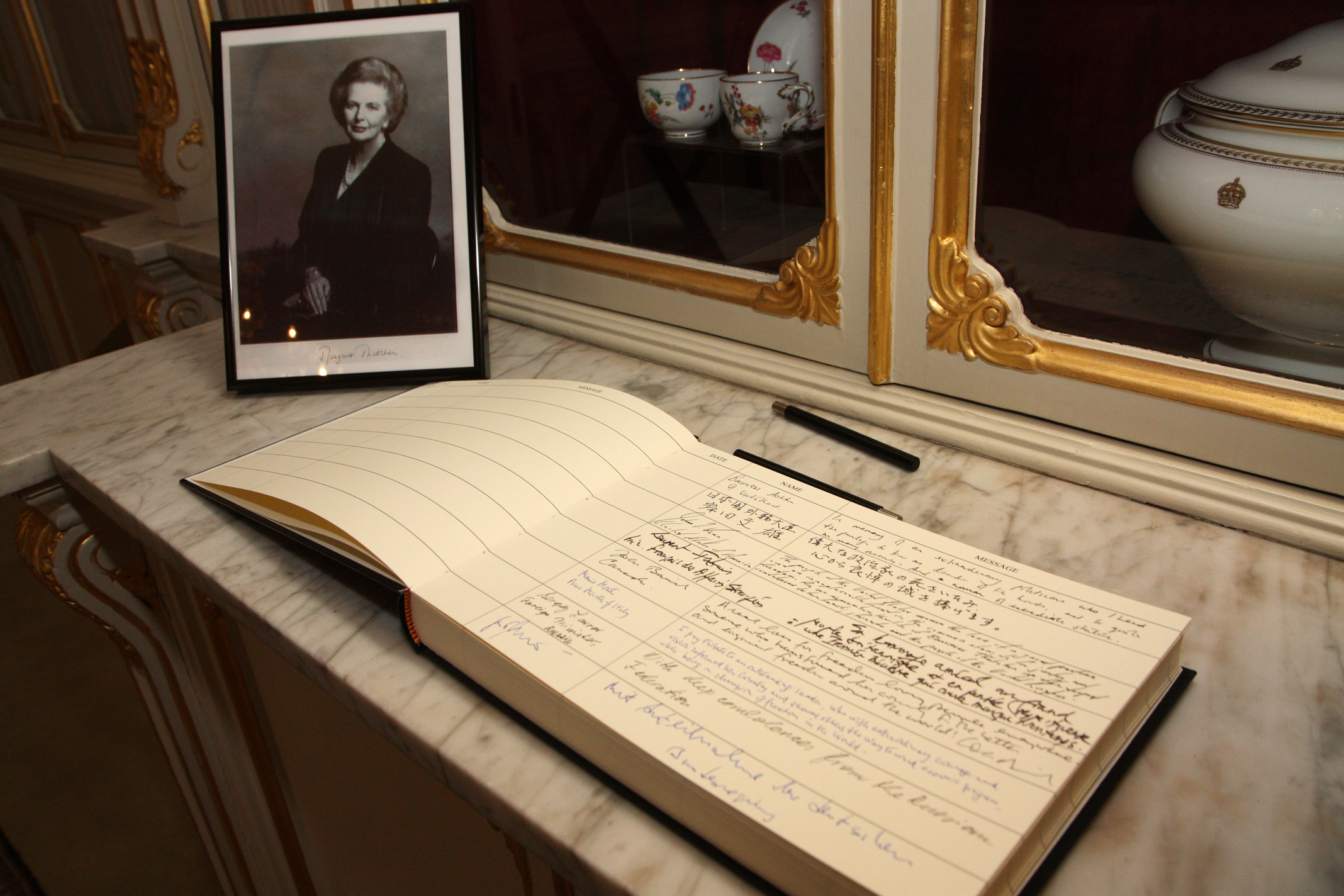
A condolence book for Margaret Thatcher, signed by visiting G8 Foreign Ministers

A condolence book or book of condolence is a book in which people may record their condolences following a death or great tragedy.

Following the death of a leading figure or great disaster, condolence books are placed in public places for members of the general public to use. When closed, the books are given to the relatives of the deceased or archived. Reviewing a condolence book may help grieving relatives come to terms with the reality of their loss.

After especially notable deaths, official records of the condolences may be compiled and reprinted. For example, after the assassination of Abraham Lincoln, the Government Printing Office published a leather-bound, gilt-edged collection of official condolences in 1867.

Digital condolence books are now placed on the Internet so people may write their thoughts online.

== See also ==
- Book of remembrance
- Eulogy
- Grief
- Memorial
- Tribute
