= Lydd =

Town in Kent, England

Coordinates: 50.9509°N 0.9064°E

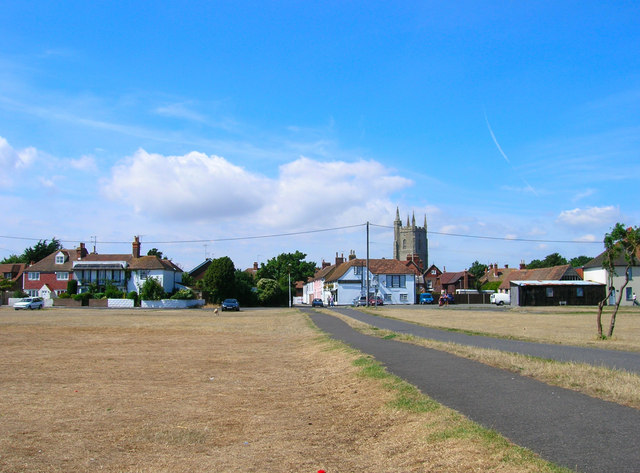
- The Rype, Lydd

- Location within Kent
- Population: 6,567 (2011)
- District: Folkestone and Hythe
- Shire county: Kent
- Region: South East
- Country: England
- Sovereign state: United Kingdom
- Post town: Romney Marsh
- Postcode district: TN29
- Dialling code: 01797
- Police: Kent
- Fire: Kent
- Ambulance: South East Coast
- UK Parliament: Folkestone and Hythe

Lydd is a town and electoral ward in Kent, England, lying on Romney Marsh. It is one of the larger settlements on the marsh, and the most southerly town in Kent. Lydd reached the height of its prosperity during the 13th century, when it was a corporate member of the Cinque Ports, a "limb" of Romney. Located on Denge Marsh, Lydd was one of the first sandy islands to form as the bay filled in and evolved into what is now called Romney Marsh.

The parish of Lydd comprises the town of Lydd, Dungeness, Lydd-on-Sea and parts of Greatstone-on-Sea.

Notable buildings in Lydd include the Gordon house longhall, a guildhall, and a medieval courthouse. Chamberlains and churchwardens' accounts of the 15th century survive alongside the town charters.

Lydd lies to the southwest of New Romney and east of Rye.

== History ==
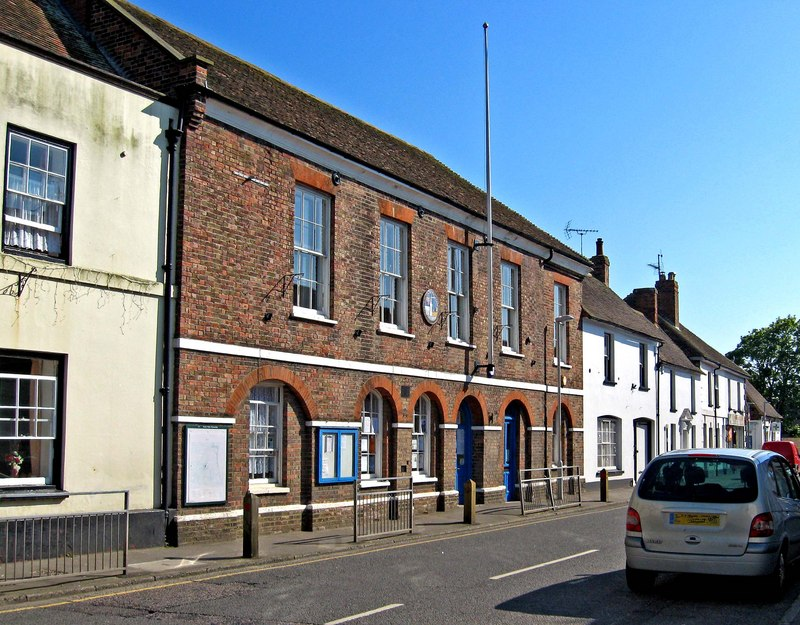
Lydd Guildhall

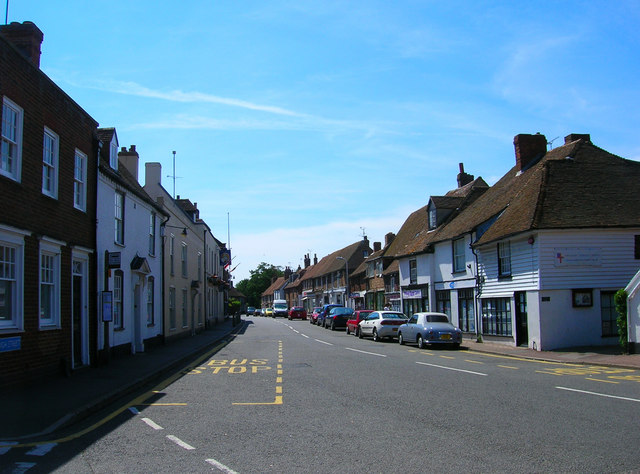
High Street, Lydd

The place-name 'Lydd' is first attested in an Anglo-Saxon charter of 774, where it appears as ad Hlidum. This is the dative plural of the Old English hlid meaning 'slope'.

Lydd developed as a settlement on a shingle island during the Romano-British period, when the coast at the time cut off Lydd from the mainland.

The settlement continued into the Saxon period, when the Saxon church used Roman materials as part of its early construction. The town reached the height of its prosperity during the 13th century, when it was a corporate member of the Cinque Ports, a "limb" of Romney.

Together with sites in the marsh, the town was a base for smuggling in the 18th and 19th centuries. Lydd Guildhall, which originally accommodated some prison cells, dates to 1792.

Before and during the First World War, Lydd Camp was important for artillery training and practice. Experiments with high explosives carried out on the shingle wastes around 1888 led to the invention of the explosive Lyddite. Lydd was at one time a garrison town. At one time it had an extensive narrow gauge railway network, and the area is still an important training ground for the armed forces. Nearby RAF Denge was established between the world wars. It has surviving concrete acoustic mirrors, developed during World War II to detect the sound of approaching aircraft before radar was perfected.

In the 20th century the hamlets of Lade and Lydd-on-Sea developed along the coast east of Lydd. They mostly consist of holiday bungalows.

=== Second World War ===
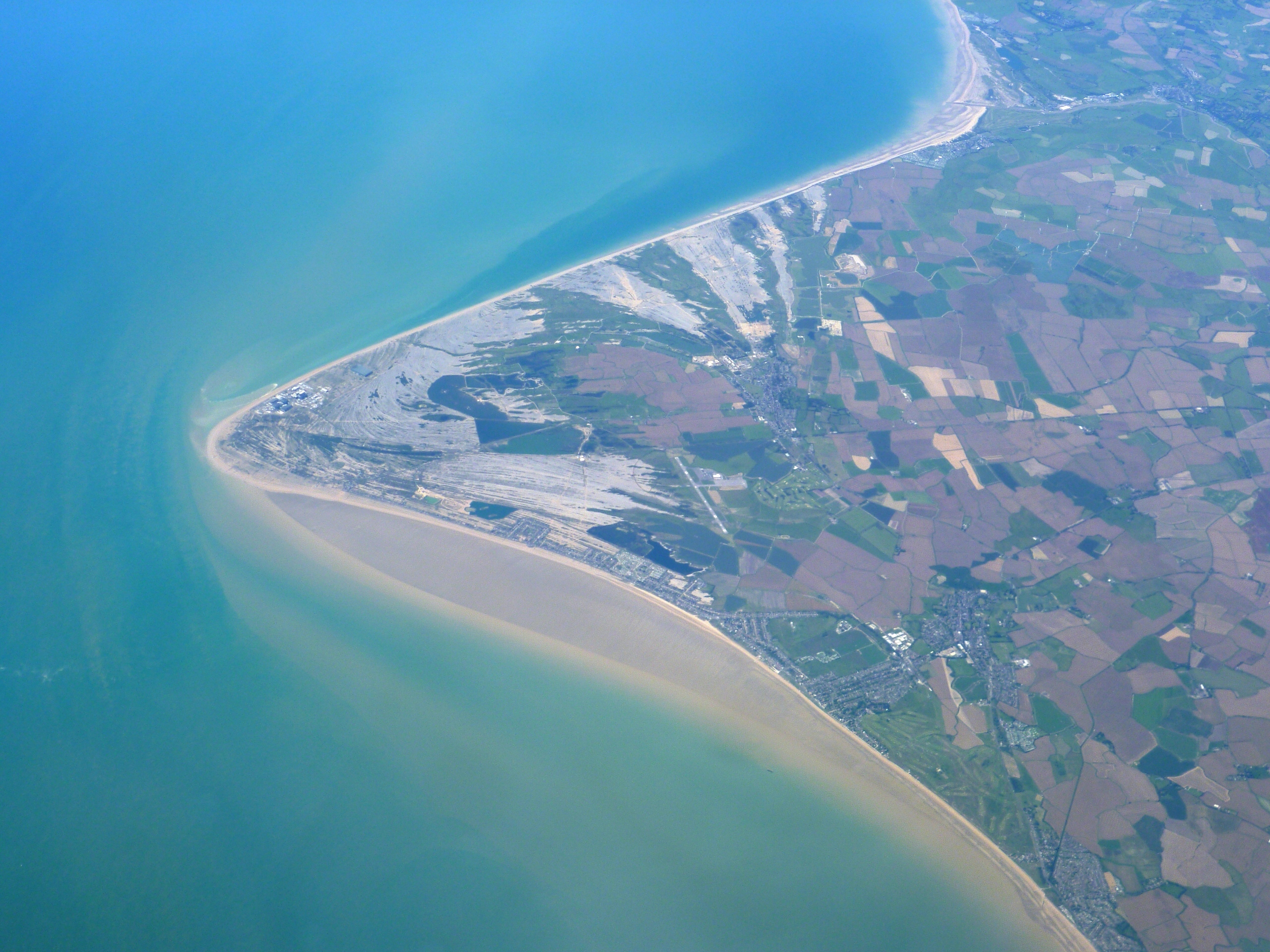
Aerial view of Lydd with the airfield in the centre of the photograph

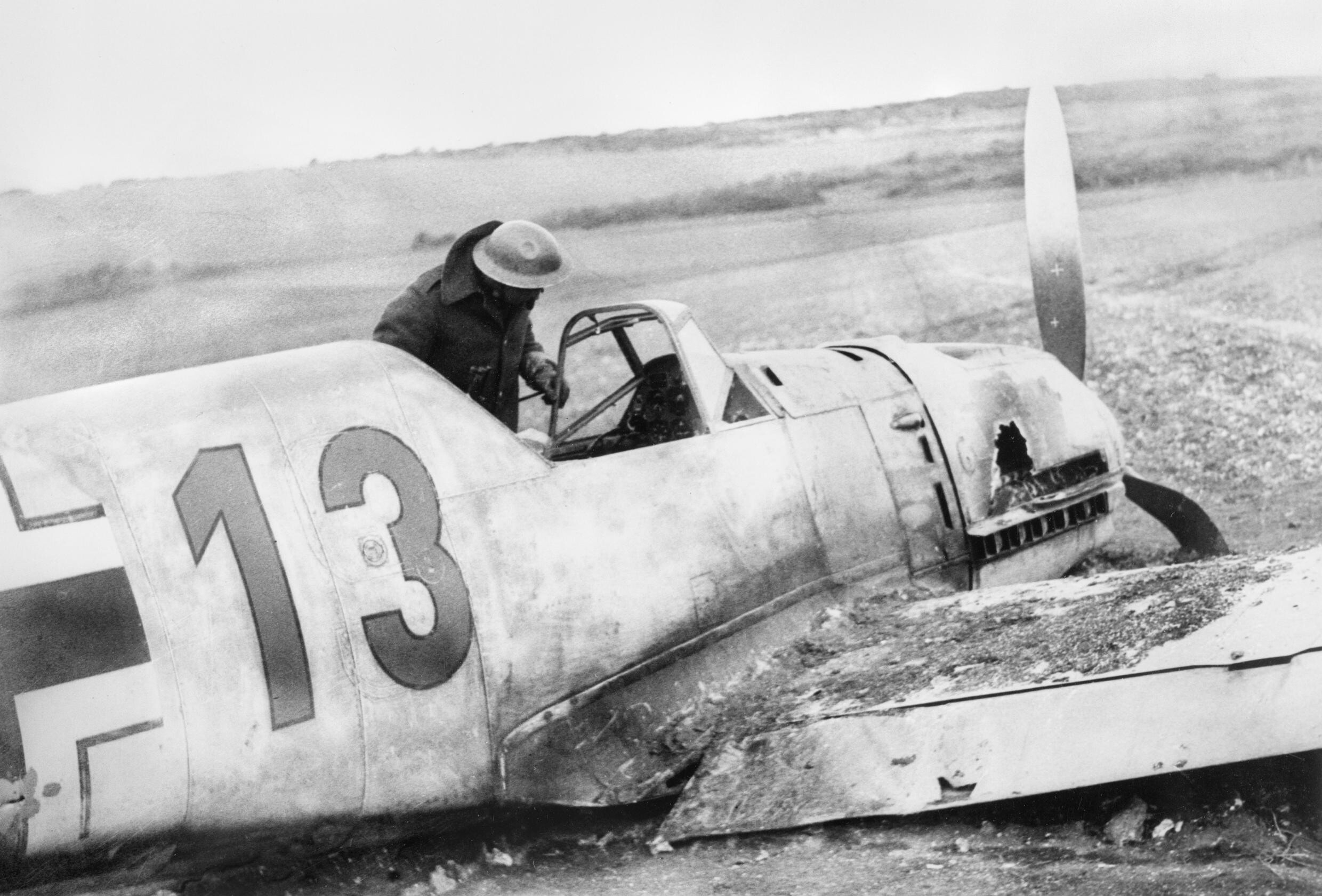
Messerschmitt Bf 109E, probably Bf 109E-1 (W.Nr. 3576) Red 13 of 7./JG 54, flown by Uffz. Zimmermann, which crashed near Lydd on 27 October 1940

In September 1940, four young Dutch men landed on the coast between Hythe and Dungeness in a rowing boat. One was arrested for spying after arousing suspicion at the Rising Sun pub, owned by Cliff and Mabel Cole.. After arriving at the pub before opening hours, requesting a perry cider and asking several odd questions about the local tide times, the publicans alerted a local RAF officer. Another of the four was subsequently caught and it was discovered he had hidden radio equipment in a tree not far from the Lydd to Dungeness road. At least three of them were sentenced to death by hanging at Pentonville prison.

On 21 October, a Dornier Do 17 ran short of fuel and was forced to land at RAF Lydd. The German pilot had been confused in his bearings whilst attempting to return to France. He had been using the recently invented equipment devised to interrupt the homing beams sent from Germany to guide such planes. The Dornier was the first example of this new type of bomber to fall into the hands of British Intelligence. RAF Lydd was situated north of the town. Only one Nissen hut now remains of the complex.

A Vickers Wellington bomber had the misfortune to crash-land on 26 June on returning from a 1,500-plane attack on Bremen. The 19-year-old pilot got the plane down safely near Lydd, and the crew survived the crash. They were not certain they had landed in England until rescuers came to their assistance.

On 27 November 1942, a train came under attack by two Focke-Wulf Fw 190s. The train, hauled by Southern Railway D3 number 2365, was just departing from Lydd Town railway station. The engine's boiler was hit. The resulting jet of high pressure steam from the engine hit the plane, causing it to crash-land nearby. The German pilot was found dead, but no British railway staff or passengers were injured. The two planes had been heading over the coast after a raid on Ashford and attacking a minesweeper off Dover.

== All Saints' Church ==
All Saints' Church, also known as Lydd Church or The Cathedral on the Marsh, belongs to the Diocese of Canterbury. All Saints is the longest parish church in Kent at 199 feet (61 m); it has one of the tallest towers in the county at 132 feet (40 m). The church is thought to incorporate a small Romano-British basilica, possibly built in the 5th century. Most of the current fabric is medieval.

It was associated with local fraternities or guilds in the 15th century and could seat 1,000 people at a time. Severely damaged by World War II bombing, the church was subsequently restored. In 1950 it was listed as a Grade I building.

Lydd church, with its tall tower, was a major link in the chain of trigonometric measuring points for the Anglo-French Survey (1784–1790). This connected the Royal Greenwich Observatory and the Paris Observatory. This eighteenth-century survey was led by General William Roy. It included a secondary base-line for checking purposes on Romney Marsh, between Ruckinge and Dymchurch. The primary base-line was on Hounslow Heath. All Saints' Lydd was the main intermediate point on the south coast between Fairlight Down to the west and Dover Castle to the east.

== Economy ==
The parish encompasses four electricity industry sites: Dungeness A & B Nuclear Power Stations, a substation of the National Grid, and a former static inverter plant used by the HVDC Cross-Channel between 1961 and 1984. Dungeness A has now ceased electricity production and is in the process of being de-commissioned. The several sewers in the area include Dengemarsh Sewer, Jury's Gut Sewer, and Scotney Petty Sewer.

== Sport ==
Lydd has two football clubs, Lydd Town established in 1885, and Lydd United, established in 2009. Lydd Town play in the Kent Invicta Football League. United play in the Ashford and District Saturday League.

Lydd also has a kart/minimoto track called Lydd International Kart Circuit. Lydd Cricket Club is based at the Banks, Dennes Lane. Both the ground and pavilion belong to the Town Council.

Lydd Golf Club and Driving Range is on the Romney Road in Lydd. Apart from the 18-hole championship quality course, it boasts an 18-bay covered driving range, a 6-hole par 3 course, two chipping greens, and a putting green.

== Local media ==
Lydd has two subscription newspapers, the Romney Marsh Herald (published by Kent Regional News and Media), and the Kentish Express (published by the KM Group). Free town newspapers include the Folkestone and Hythe Extra. A fortnightly publication called The Looker is published by the owners of RMFM. An alternate publication called The Marsh Mail was edited by Amanda Heath; it was published for only a couple of editions. The Looker 'has the largest circulation, comprising 15,000 copies every two weeks.

Local news and television programmes are provided by BBC South East and ITV Meridian. Television signals are received from the Dover TV transmitter.

The local radio station for Lydd is KMFM Shepway and White Cliffs Country. Lydd is also served by the county-wide stations Heart South, Gold, and BBC Radio Kent.

Cinque Ports Radio 100.2FM is the community radio station for Romney Marsh and Rye. It has been broadcasting since 7 March 2022. This replaced Shoreline FM 100.2FM, which broadcast since January 2020. It is now an online service called Shoreline Easy, serving Romney Marsh, Rye, and Hythe.

== Club day ==
Lydd Club Day is the annual local carnival held on the Rype. It is the largest such festival on Romney Marsh, and is held on the third Saturday of June.

It was established in 1868. Apart from a brief cessation during the war years, it has taken place annually ever since. The day features a funfair, boot fair in the morning, stalls and children's dressing up in the afternoon, and floats in the evening. The evening ends with a firework display and the lit up funfair, as well as the annual crowning of the Queen Elect.

On the Friday evening before Lydd Club Day, a long-standing tradition supports Test Night, when the funfair opens at reduced prices for the evening.

== Railways ==
A railway line from Dungeness to Appledore formerly had stations at Lydd Town and Lydd-on-Sea.

This operated December 1881 to 1967. It was closed then to passenger traffic. The line remains in use for freight traffic. There has been discussion to reopen the line. By being included in the Folkestone and Hythe district Local Plan, the station is protected against development that could be prejudicial to the reopening of the line from Appledore to the public.

The Romney, Hythe and Dymchurch Railway has two stations within the Lydd parish: Romney Sands and Dungeness.

== Airport ==
Lydd Airport, originally known as Ferryfield, and now also known as London Ashford Airport, was the first airport to be constructed in Britain after the Second World War.

== Media ==
The area was famously used as the setting for the film The Dark Man in 1951.

== Notable individuals ==
David Denne (1799–1861), of the family of that name from Lydd, was an English first-class cricketer, Deputy Lieutenant and Justice of the Peace for the County of Kent, and formerly Captain of the East Kent and Cinque Ports Yeomanry, and Bailiff of the town Corporation 23 times.

Samuel Fisher (1605–1665), a noted lecturer at Lydd, resigned his lectureship to become Baptist and a Quaker. He was noted for his controversial religious views, and is notable for his book Rusticus ad Academicos: The Rusticks Alarm to the Rabbies. It is considered to anticipate some principles of modern biblical criticism. Fisher lived in Lydd from 1632 until 1660.

== Climate ==
Climate in this area has mild differences between highs and lows, and there is adequate rainfall year-round. The Köppen Climate Classification subtype for this climate is "Cfb" (Marine West Coast Climate/Oceanic climate).

Climate data for Lydd Airport weather station, 16m amsl (ICAO code: EGMD, WMO identifier: 03887)
Month	Jan	Feb	Mar	Apr	May	Jun	Jul	Aug	Sep	Oct	Nov	Dec	Year
Mean daily maximum °C (°F)	7 (45)	7 (45)	9 (48)	11 (52)	14 (58)	17 (63)	19 (67)	20 (68)	18 (65)	14 (58)	10 (50)	8 (46)	13 (55)
Mean daily minimum °C (°F)	2.77 (36.978664)	3 (37)	3 (37)	5 (41)	8 (46)	11 (51)	13 (56)	13 (56)	12 (53)	8 (47)	5 (41)	3 (38)	7 (45)
Average precipitation mm (inches)	48 (1.9)	41 (1.6)	46 (1.8)	36 (1.4)	33 (1.3)	41 (1.6)	46 (1.8)	51 (2)	53 (2.1)	89 (3.5)	71 (2.8)	71 (2.8)	620 (24.6)
Average relative humidity (%)	86	84	79	75	76	75	74	75	77	83	86	86	80
Average dew point °C (°F)	4 (39)	4 (39)	5 (41)	7 (45)	9 (48)	12 (54)	14 (57)	14 (57)	13 (55)	11 (52)	8 (46)	5 (41)	9 (48)
Source 1: Weatherbase
Source 2: Time and Date (dewpoints and humidity, between 2005−2015)
