= Book of remembrance =

Book commemorating those who have died

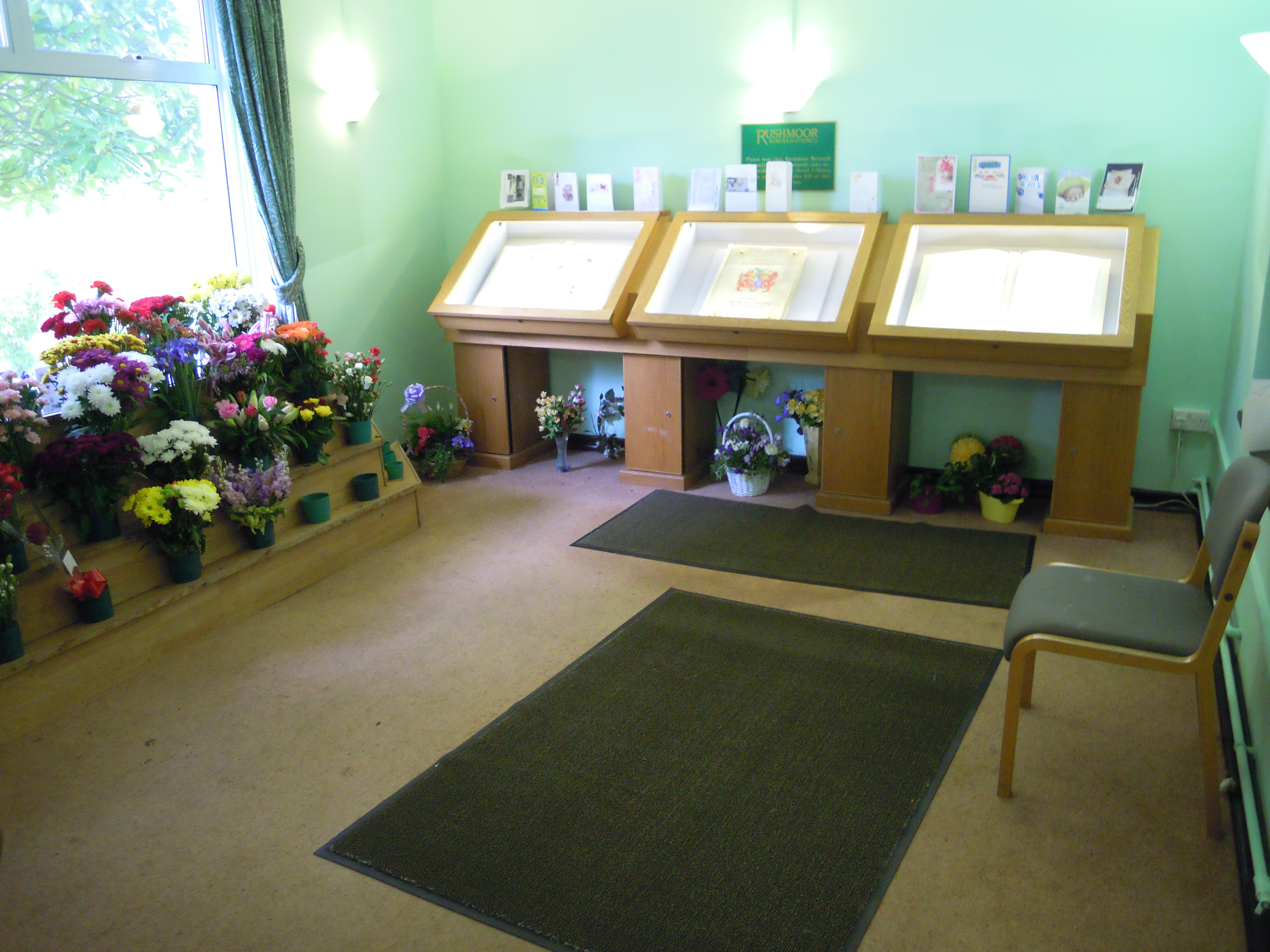
Books of remembrance at a crematorium.

A book of remembrance is a book commemorating those who have died, usually listing their names in date or alphabetical order. They are often compiled to commemorate war dead and others who have died on military operations. Another use is to commemorate people who have been cremated or buried at a location, as an alternative to grave markers.

Books of remembrance are often held by municipal authorities or churches and pages may be turned daily in memory of those on each page.

== See also ==
- Books of Remembrance (Canada)
- Condolence book
- Gedenkbuch
- Yizkor books
