= Tulip Period architecture =

Ottoman architecture in the early 18th century

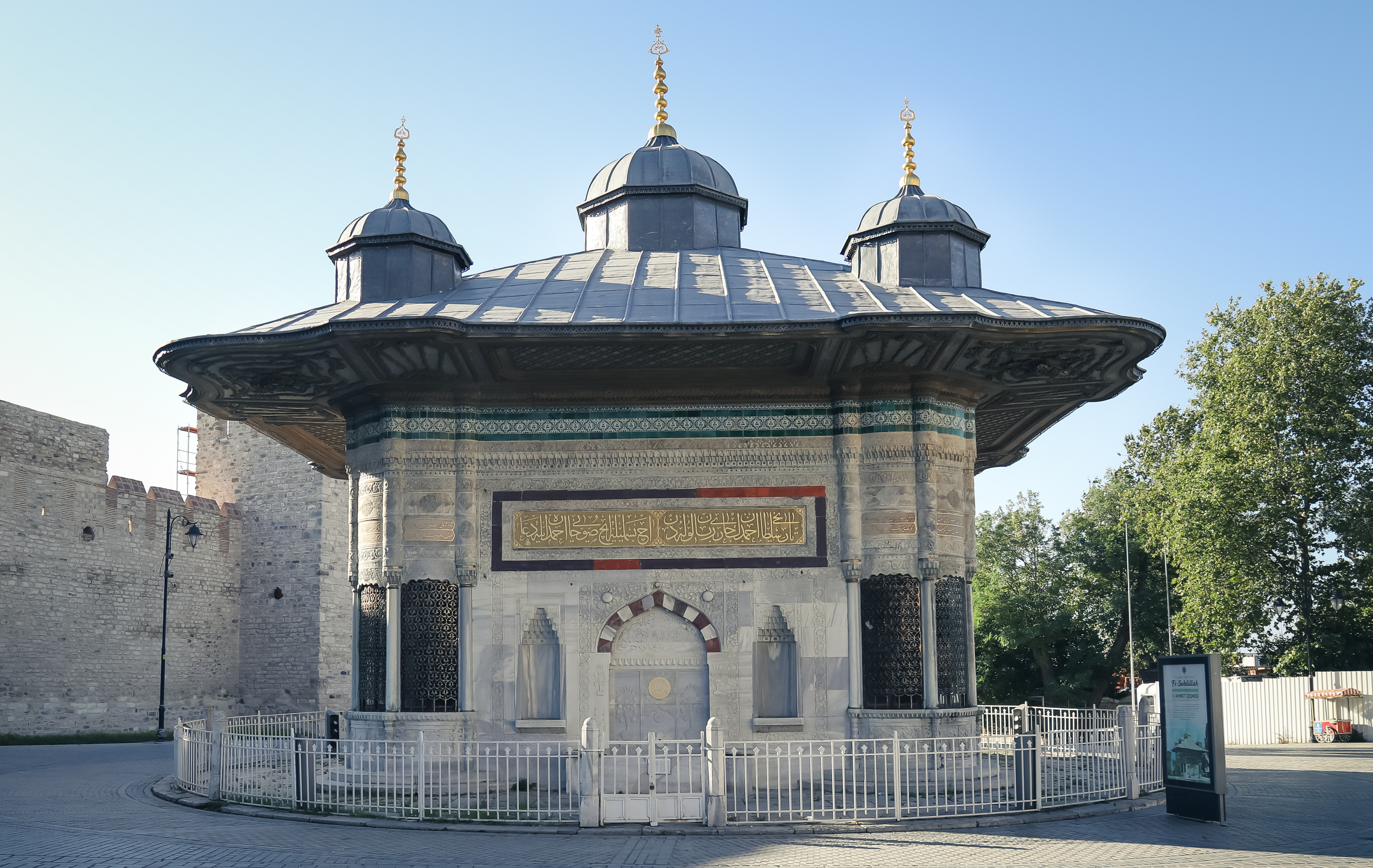
The Fountain of Ahmed III in Istanbul, one of the most iconic monuments of the Tulip Period

Tulip Period architecture was a stage in Ottoman architecture in the early 18th century. New types of decoration were introduced into the existing classical style of Ottoman architecture and new types of buildings, such as stand-alone fountains and libraries, became important landmarks. The style is most closely associated with the Tulip Period (1718-1730), a period of peace during the reign of Ahmed III when architectural patronage increased in Istanbul after a relative lull in the late 17th century. However, the new style was also present at the beginning of Ahmed III's reign and continued to be evident after him in the 1730s. The introduction of European influences in Ottoman culture and architecture eventually led to the creation of the Ottoman Baroque style in the 1740s.

== Background ==
Up to the end of the 17th century, Ottoman architecture was dominated by the classical style which developed during the tenure of chief architect Sinan during the 16th century, at the apogee of Ottoman power and culture. From the 18th century onward, European influences were introduced into Ottoman architecture as the Ottoman Empire itself became more open to outside influences. The term “Baroque” is sometimes applied more widely to Ottoman art and architecture across the 18th century including the Tulip Period. In more specific terms, however, the period after the 17th century is marked by several different styles.

The first signs heralding the new decorative style of the early 18th century can be seen in the yalı (waterside mansion) of Amcazade Hüseyin Köprülü Pasha on the shores of the Bosphorus, completed around 1698. The wooden mansion, which has since suffered from decay over time, contains painted panels featuring flower vases, possibly inspired from the motifs of tile decoration like that inside the Sultan Ahmed I Mosque. Similar painted decoration was used years later in the “Fruit Room” or Room of Ahmet III in Topkapı Palace. The construction of the yalı far outside the city also signalled a less restrained attitude to construction in the capital, foreshadowing the luxurious constructions that would take place along the region's waterways in the future.

The beginning of Ahmed III's reign in 1703 saw the royal court return to Istanbul after a long period of residence in Edirne in the late 17th century. The historical period known as the “Tulip Period” or "Tulip Era" is considered to have begun in 1718, after the Treaty of Passarowitz, and lasted until the Patrona Halil revolts of 1730, when Ahmed III was overthrown. The treaty formalized Ottoman territorial losses but also initiated a period of peace. It also inaugurated a new era of growing cross-cultural exchange and curiosity between the Ottoman Empire and Western Europe. The idea of a distinct "Tulip Period" in Ottoman history, associated with the beginnings of Westernization or modernisation in the empire, has been criticized by some recent historians, such as Cemal Kafadar and Can Erimtan, who view it as being in large part a historiographical invention by earlier historians in the 20th century.

This period saw significant influence from the French Rococo style (part of the wider Baroque style) that emerged around this time under the reign of Louis XV. In 1720, an Ottoman embassy led by Yirmisekiz Çelebi Mehmed Efendi was sent to Paris and, upon returning in 1721, brought back reports and illustrations of the French Baroque style which made a strong impression in the sultan's court. In addition to European influences, the decoration of the Tulip Period was also strongly influenced by Safavid art and architecture to the east; specifically the style seen in Isfahan during the reign of Shah Abbas. The combination of peacetime and the court's return to Istanbul resulted in renewed building activity in the capital. Significant efforts were also made to repair or restore many of the city's older buildings. Ahmed III's grand vizier, Nevşehirli Damat Ibrahim Pasha, was in large part responsible for stimulating this construction and restoration activity. Other factors, such as an earthquake in 1719, may have also encouraged new repair work. Scholar Ünver Rüstem argues that the patronage of Ahmet III's court in the realm of architecture and culture in this period was part of an effort to reengage the public with its rulers after the latter had become secluded during the royal court's time in Edirne.

== Major monuments and developments ==
=== The first Ottoman libraries ===
The construction of stand-alone library structures was one of the early new trends influenced by European ideas. Until the late 17th century, the Ottomans did not build libraries except as minor elements attached to mosques or other charitable buildings. The first independent library was the Köprülü Library built by Köprülü Fazıl Ahmed Pasha in 1678 as part of the architectural complex in Istanbul created by his father, Köprülü Mehmed Pasha. During the Tulip Period, the Library of Ahmed III in the Third Court of Topkapı Palace (inside the Enderun School) was completed in 1719, right before Yirmisekiz's embassy to Paris. It is built in the late classical style, but some of its details foreshadow an end to the classical style, such as the absence of pendentives in the corners of the domes and the style of the windows. Other stand-alone libraries from the early 18th century include the Şehit Ali Pasha Library (1715; formerly part of a palace, now located in the grounds of the Vefa School) and the Ahmediye Library in Üsküdar (1721). Each consisted of a book depot and an attached reading room.

Early libraries

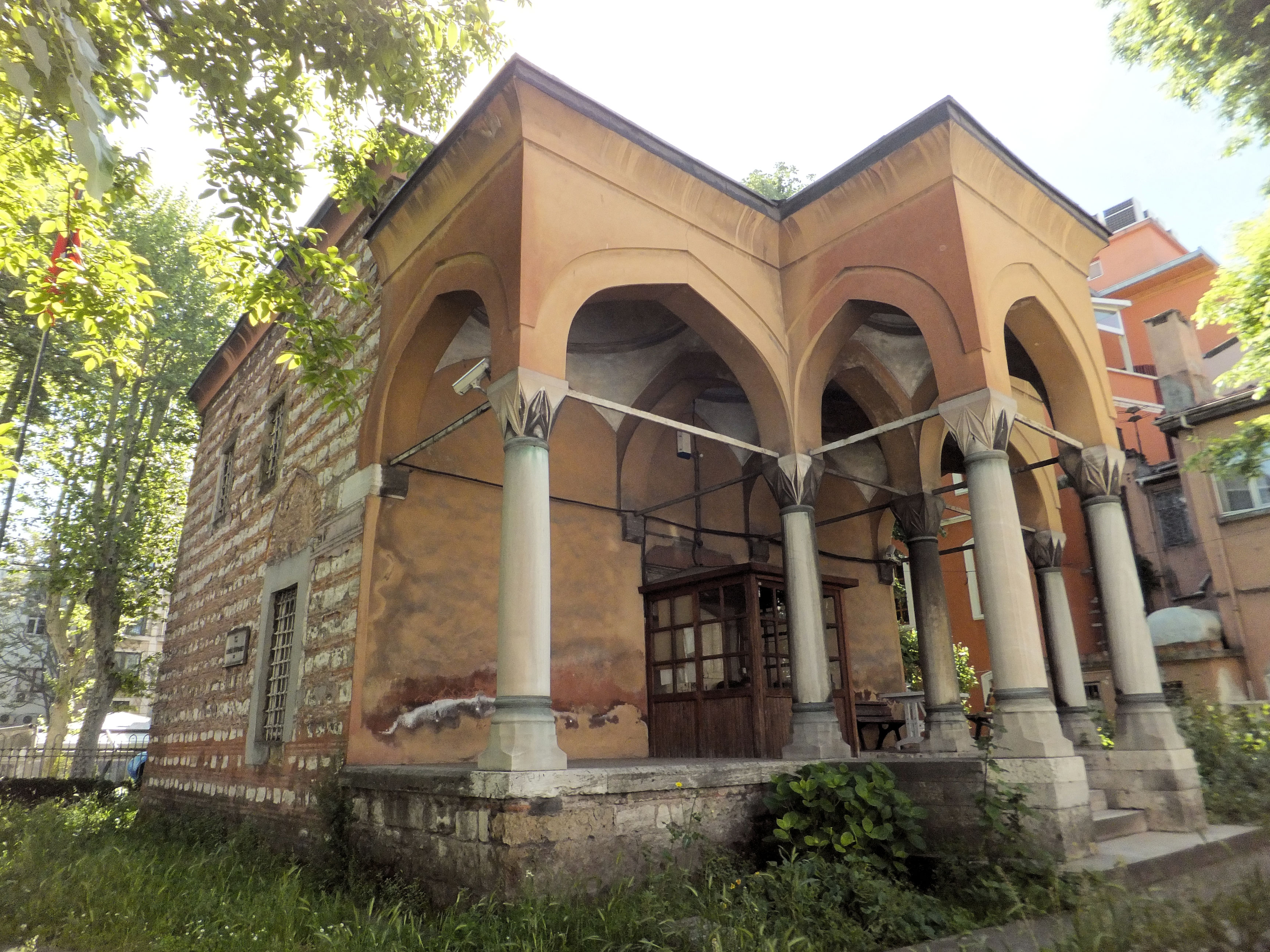
Köprülü Library, Istanbul (1678)

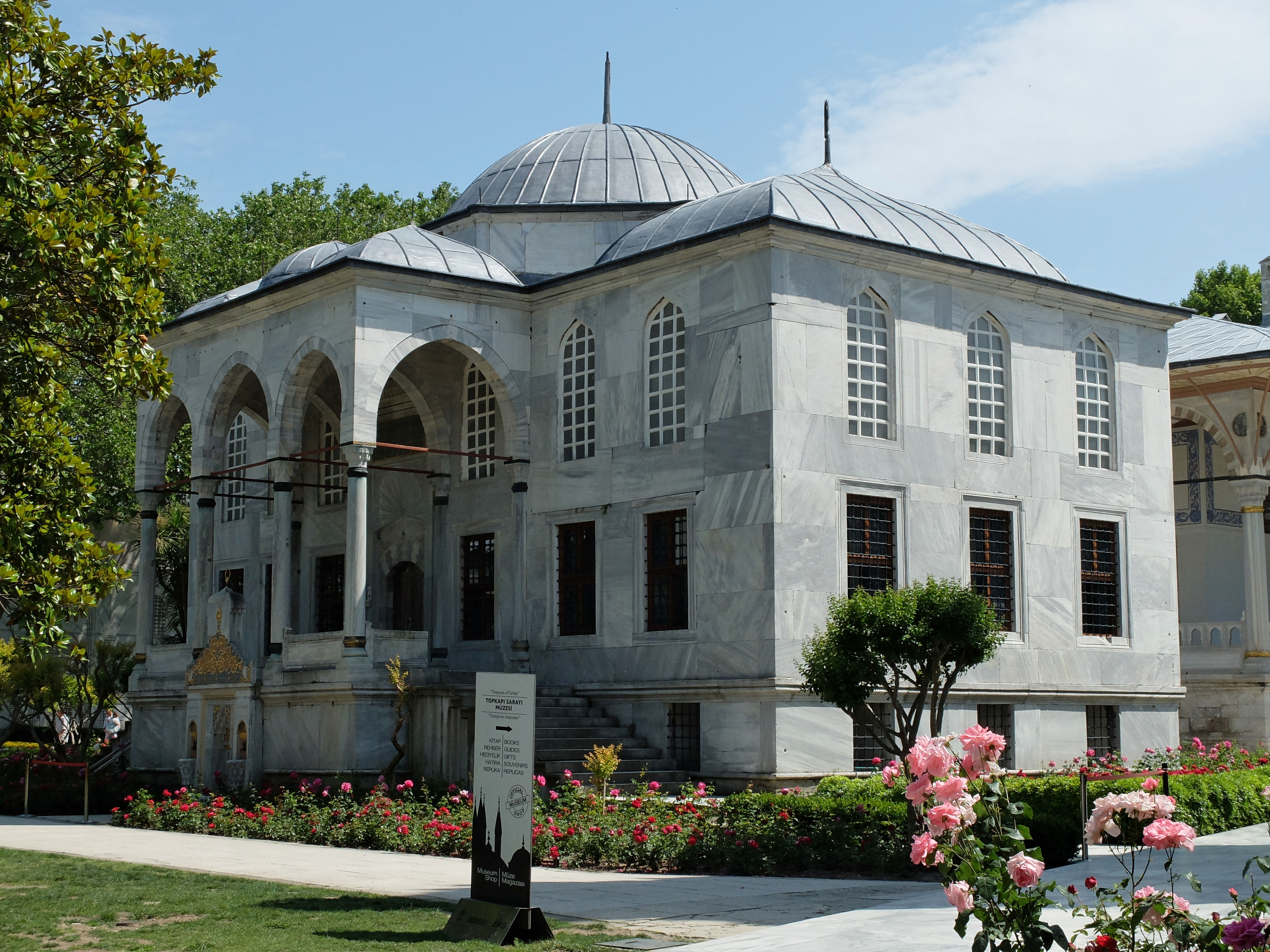
Ahmed III Library in Topkapı Palace, Istanbul (1719)

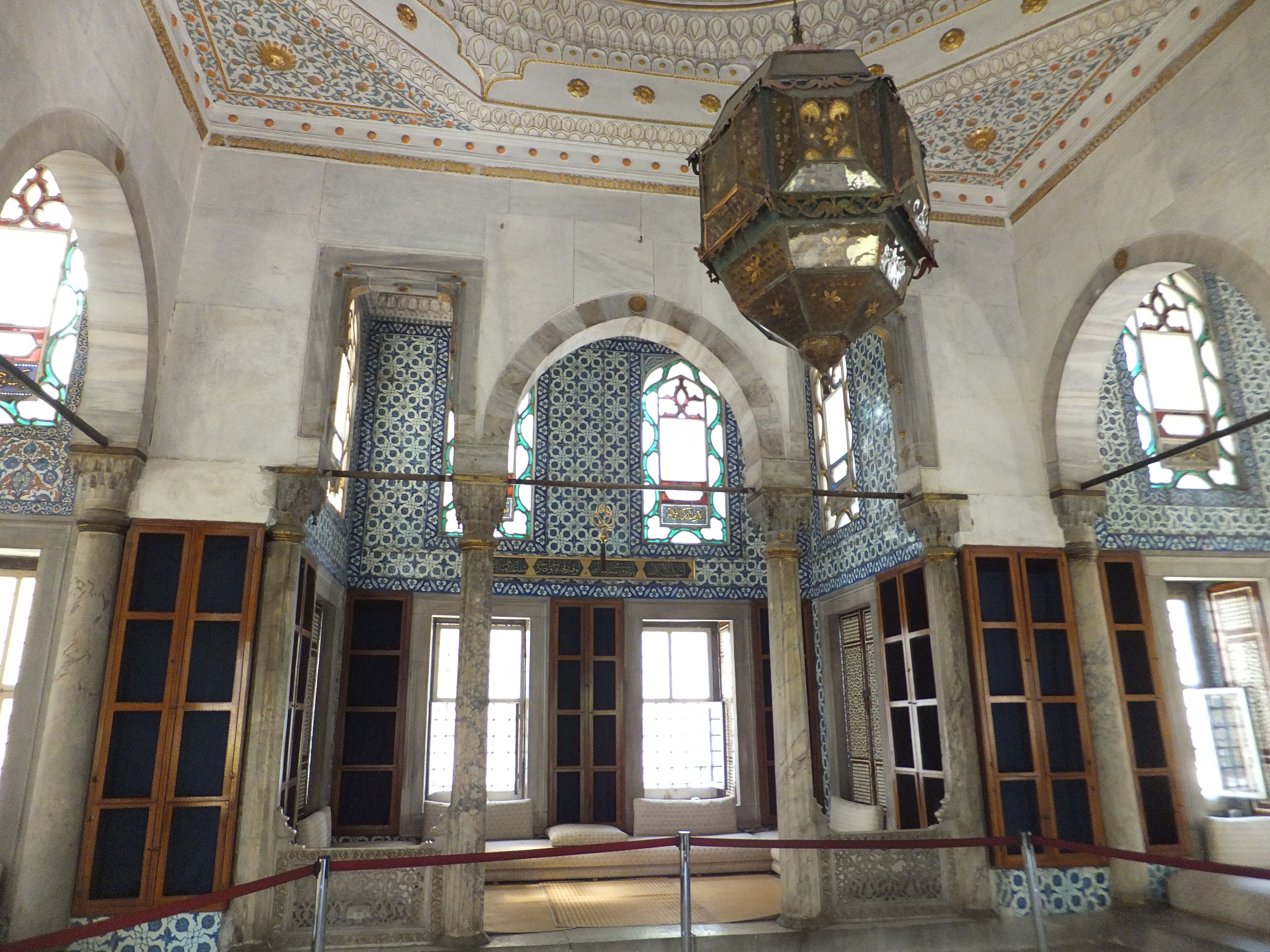
Ahmed III Library interior

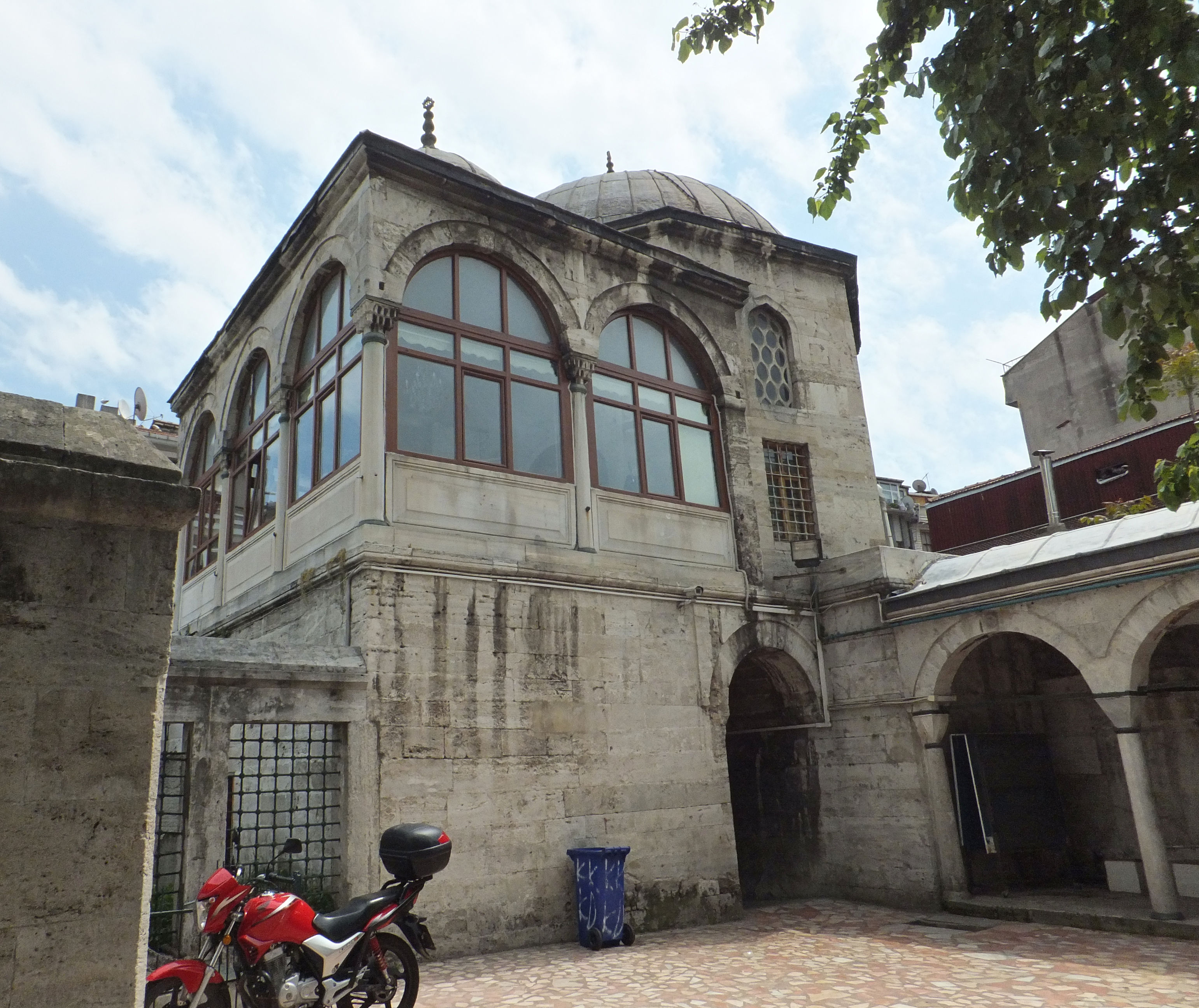
Library in the Ahmediye Complex in Üsküdar (1721)

=== Palace architecture ===
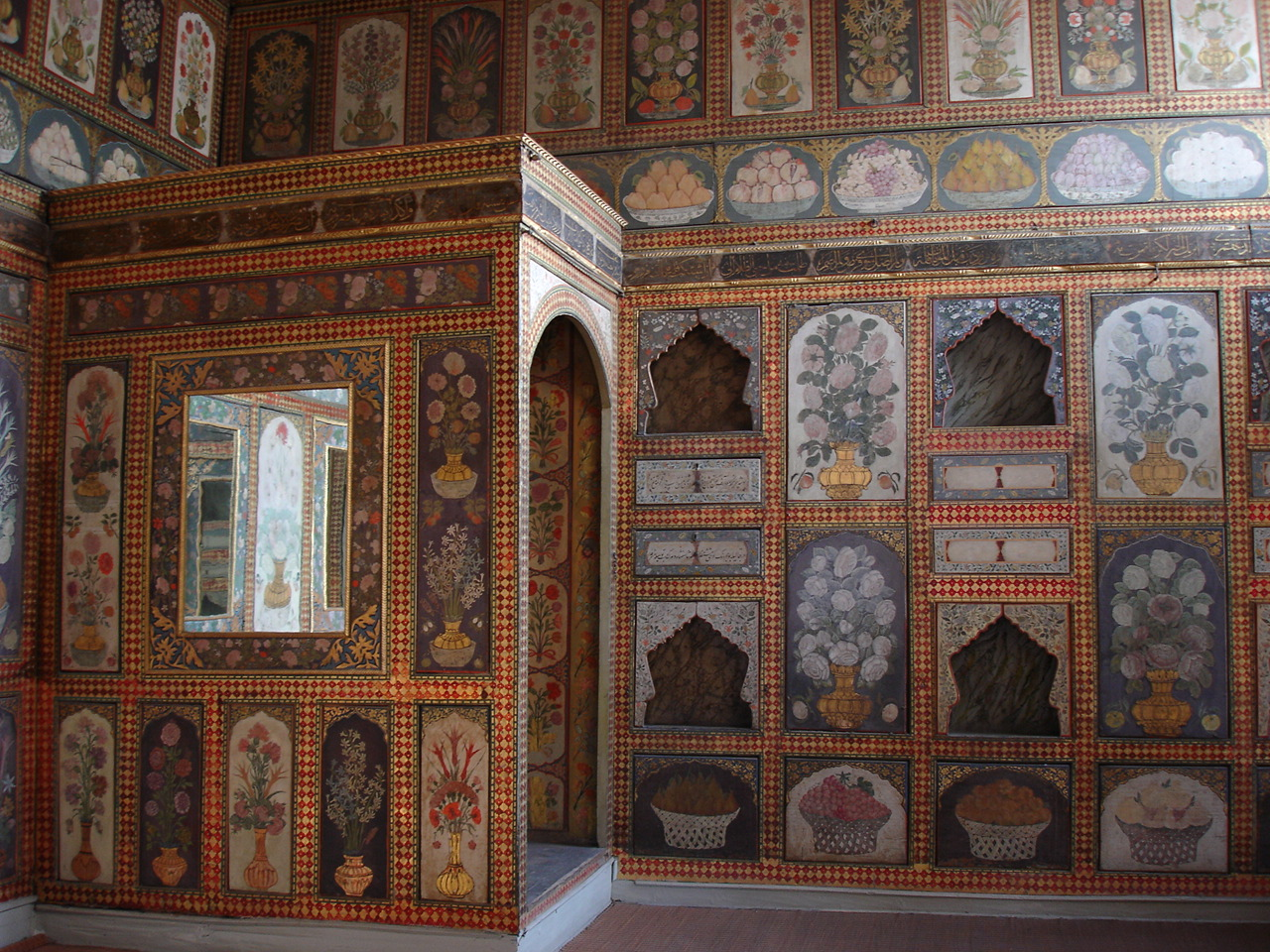
The Fruit Room in the Harem of Topkapı Palace (1705)

In 1705, soon after Ahmed III returned the royal court to Istanbul, a new dining room was added to the Harem of Topkapi Palace, next to the Chamber of Murad III and the Chamber of Ahmed I. Known today as the "Fruit Room", the room is notable for its imagery of flower vases and fruit bowls painted onto wooden panels. While floral motifs and imagery were well-established in Ottoman art and decoration before this, these paintings distinguish themselves from earlier examples by their naturalism. This reflected an influence from modes of representation in contemporary European art. This particular decorative technique was known as Edirnekārī and originated in Edirne during the second half of the 17th century. Ünver Rüstem states that the Fruit Room demonstrates how the Tulip Period style was already in existence during the early reign of Ahmed III (before 1718) and how it owed some of its elements to even earlier trends. He also notes similarities between the Edirnekārī style and the style of floral decoration seen in 17th-century Mughal art and architecture.

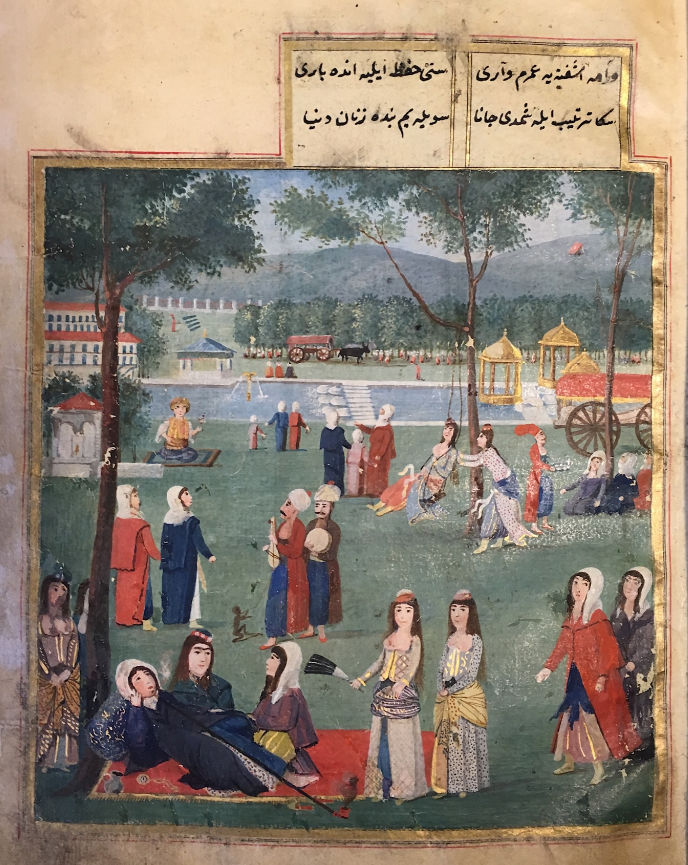
Illustration in the Zenanname showing women at the Sadâbâd gardens, with the canal and pavilions in the background.

One of the most important creations of the Tulip Period was the Sadâbâd Palace, a new summer palace designed and built by Damat Ibrahim Pasha in 1722–1723 for Ahmed III. It was located at Kâğıthane, a rural area on the outskirts of the city with small rivers that flow into the Golden Horn inlet. The palace grounds included a long marble-lined canal, the Cedval-i Sim, around which were gardens, pavilions, and palace apartments in a landscaped setting. This overall design probably emulated French pleasure palaces as a result of Yirmisekiz's reports about Paris and Versailles. The main palace building, belonging to the sultan himself, consisted of a single block, which may be the first time that an Ottoman palace was designed like this, in contrast with the multiple pavilions and courtyards of the Topkapı Palace. In addition to his own palace, the sultan encouraged members of his court to build their own separate pavilions along the canal. The regular inhabitants of Istanbul also used the surrounding area as a recreational ground for excursions and picnics. This was a new practice in Ottoman culture that brought the public within close proximity of the ruler's abode for the first time and it was noted by contemporary art and literature such as in the poems of Nedîm and in the Zenanname (Book of Women") by Enderûnlu Fâzıl.

The sultan's palace at Sadâbâd was built in wood and was completed in less than three months. The other pavilions were typically built with delicate materials like plaster and lath. These low-cost materials characterized many constructions of this period and made it easier to carry out the state's new program of rapid and widespread architectural activity. Aside from the sultan's main palace, one of the most notable pavilions at Sadâbâd was the Kasr-ı Cinan, a cruciform kiosk with thirty columns and a central fountain, standing next to a large pool along the course of the canal. At the center of this pool was a jet fountain sculpted in the shape of four spiraling serpents. Stand-alone jet fountains of this kind had been a common feature in European architecture but were not previously a common feature of Ottoman palaces. Despite the French influence, the layout of the palace apartments themselves remained rooted in Turkish traditions. Some scholars have consequently argued that the role of French influence on the palace design has been exaggerated. Some scholarship also suggests that influences from Safavid Iran may have played a greater role as there are parallels between Sadâbâd and the Safavid creations in Isfahan such as the Chahar Bagh Avenue and the Chehel Sotoun Palace.

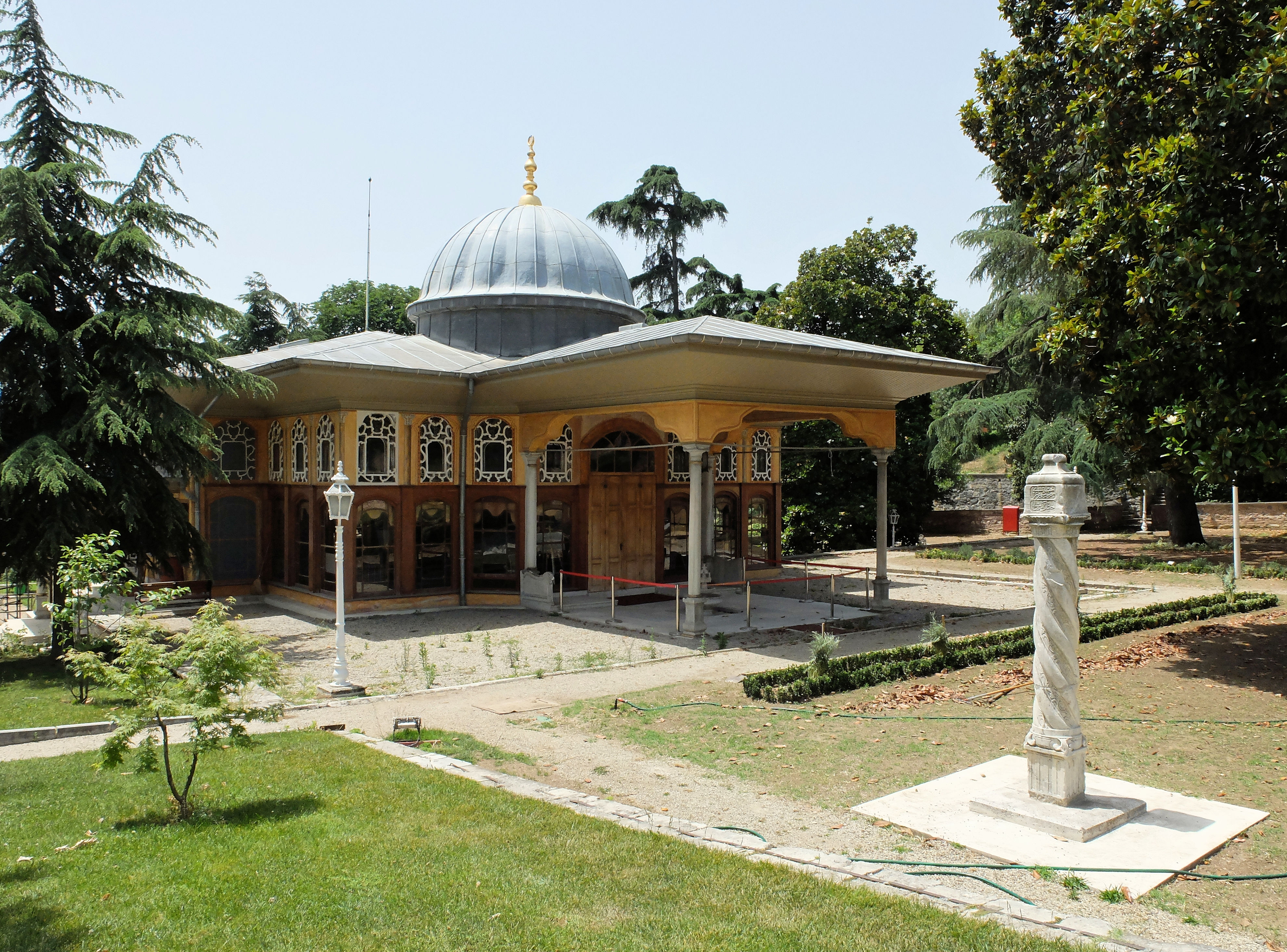
The Aynalıkavak Pavilion in Istanbul, first built during the reign of Ahmed III but significantly remodelled during the later Baroque period

Aside from the much later Yildiz Palace (which also includes sprawling grounds with various separate pavilions), the Sadâbâd Palace was unique in the history of Ottoman architecture. During the Patrona Halil revolts of 1730 the pavilions and gardens of the upper elites were destroyed by mobs, but the sultan's palace itself survived. It was repaired by Selim III (r. 1789–1807) and rebuilt by Mahmud II (r. 1808–1839), before being demolished by Abdülaziz (r. 1861–1876) and replaced with the Çağlayan Palace.

Ottoman wooden mansions continued to be built on the shores of the Golden Horn and the Bosphorus until the 20th century, although they continued to be based on traditional models of Ottoman domestic architecture. One example is the Aynalıkavak Pavilion which dates back to the reign of Ahmed III. It was originally built within the Tersane Palace, a larger and older waterside palace that stretched along the shore of the Golden Horn near the Imperial Arsenal (Tersane). The Aynalıkavak Pavilion's general floor plan may still date from Ahmed III's time but the structure and its decoration were renovated and modified by Selim III and Mahmud II.

=== Fountains and sebils ===
The culmination of the Tulip Period style is represented by a series of monumental stand-alone fountains that were mostly built between 1728 and 1732. Water took on an enlarged role in architecture and the urban landscape of Istanbul during the Tulip Period. In the first half of the 18th century, Istanbul's water supply infrastructure, including the aqueducts in Belgrad Forest, were renovated and expanded. In 1732, an important water distribution structure, the taksim, was first built on what is now Taksim Square. The new fountains were unprecedented in Ottoman architecture. Previously, fountains and sebils only existed as minor elements of larger charitable complexes or as shadirvans inside mosque courtyards. The maidan fountain – meaning a stand-alone fountain at the center of a city square – was introduced for the first time in this period.

The first and most remarkable of these fountains is the Ahmed III Fountain built in 1728 next to the Hagia Sophia and in front of the outer gate of Topkapı Palace. It consists of a square structure with rounded corners, surmounted by a roof with five small domes and very wide eaves projecting out over the sides of the structure. Each of the four façades of the square structure features a wall fountain, while each of the four rounded corners is occupied by a sebil. Water was drawn from a cistern inside the structure. The stone walls on the exterior are carved with very fine vegetal ornamentation and calligraphic inscriptions. Acanthus leaves and other motifs of Baroque Rococo appearance are carved under the projecting eaves of the roof. Painting was applied to highlight some carved details, a practice that become common in the 18th century. The "S" and "C" curves of Baroque architecture, which were to become popular in later years, also make an early appearance in some of the fountain's details.

Another fountain was built by Ahmed III in the same year at Üsküdar, near the old Mihrimah Sultan Mosque. This fountain is a slightly simplified version of the other one and lacks the corner sebils, which are replaced with corner fountains instead. A more ornate example, this time built by Mahmud I in 1732, is the Tophane Fountain built next to the old Kılıç Ali Pasha Mosque at Tophane. Further northeast is the Hekimoglu Ali Pasha Fountain, also built in 1732, which has only two decorated façades with fountains. Other important examples of fountains and sebils from the same year are the Saliha Sultan Sebil in the Azapkapi neighbourhood and the Bereketzade Fountain located near Galata Tower.

Tulip Period fountains and sebils

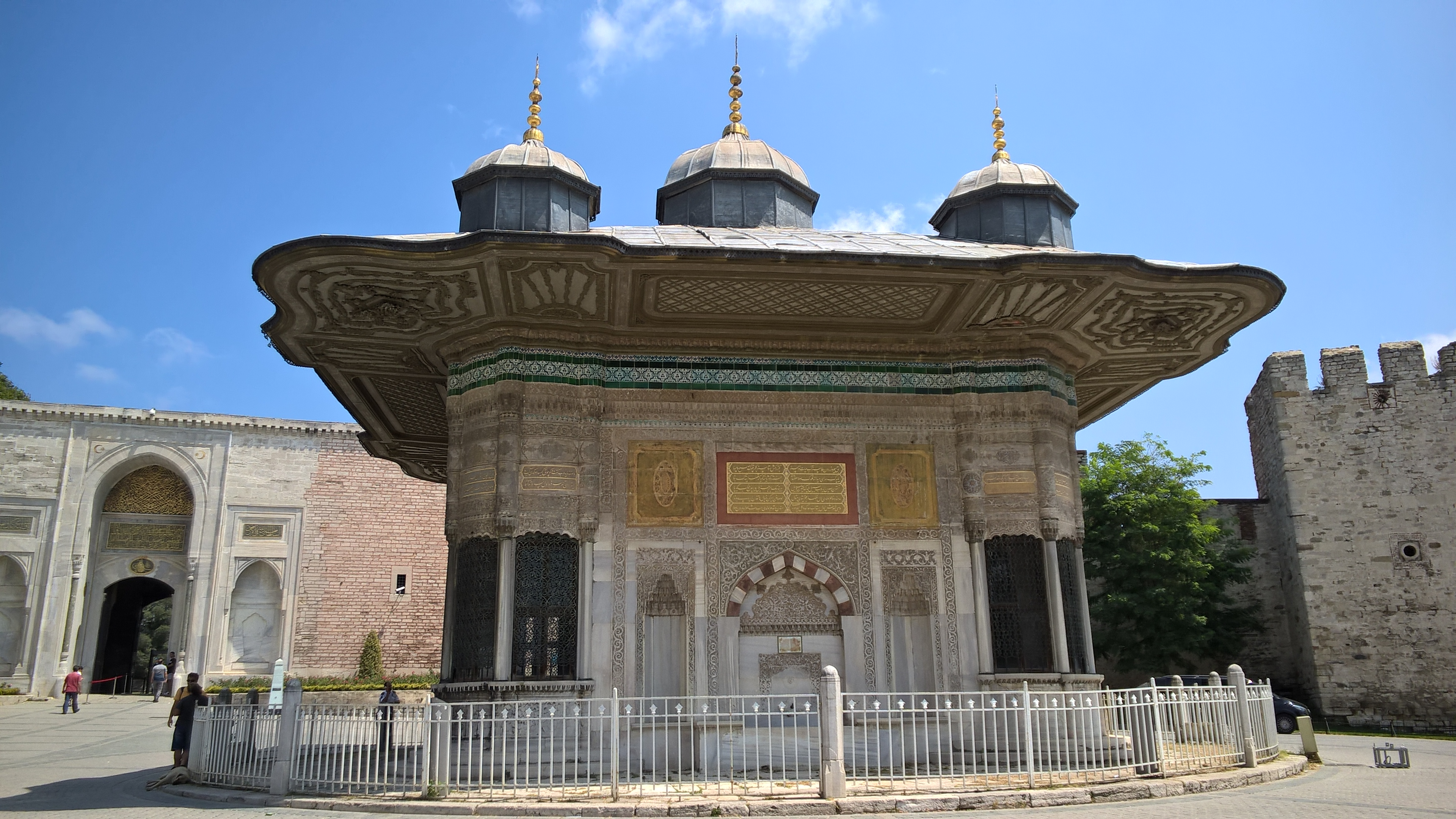
Ahmed III Fountain near Hagia Sophia (1728)

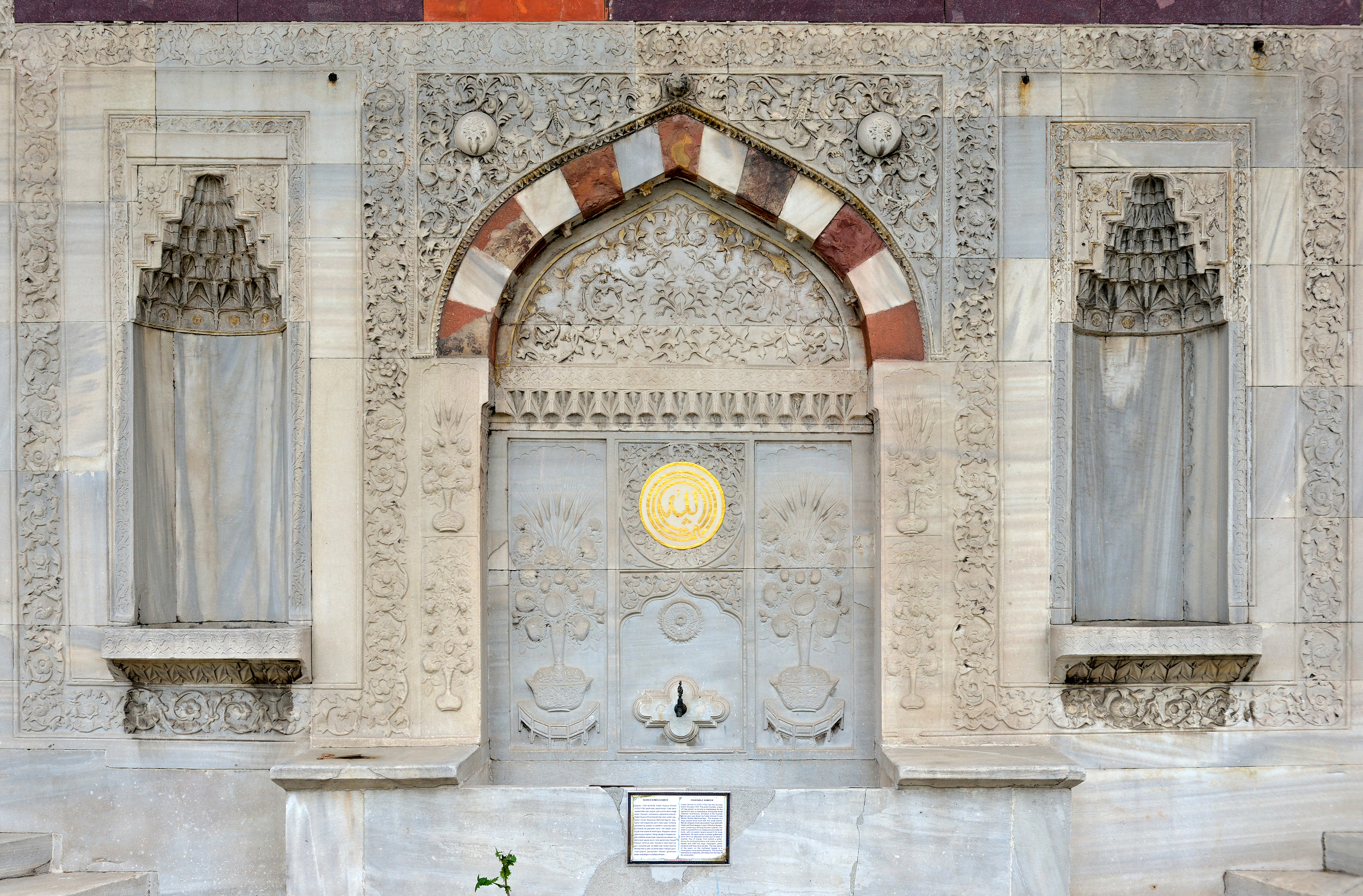
Ahmed III Fountain details

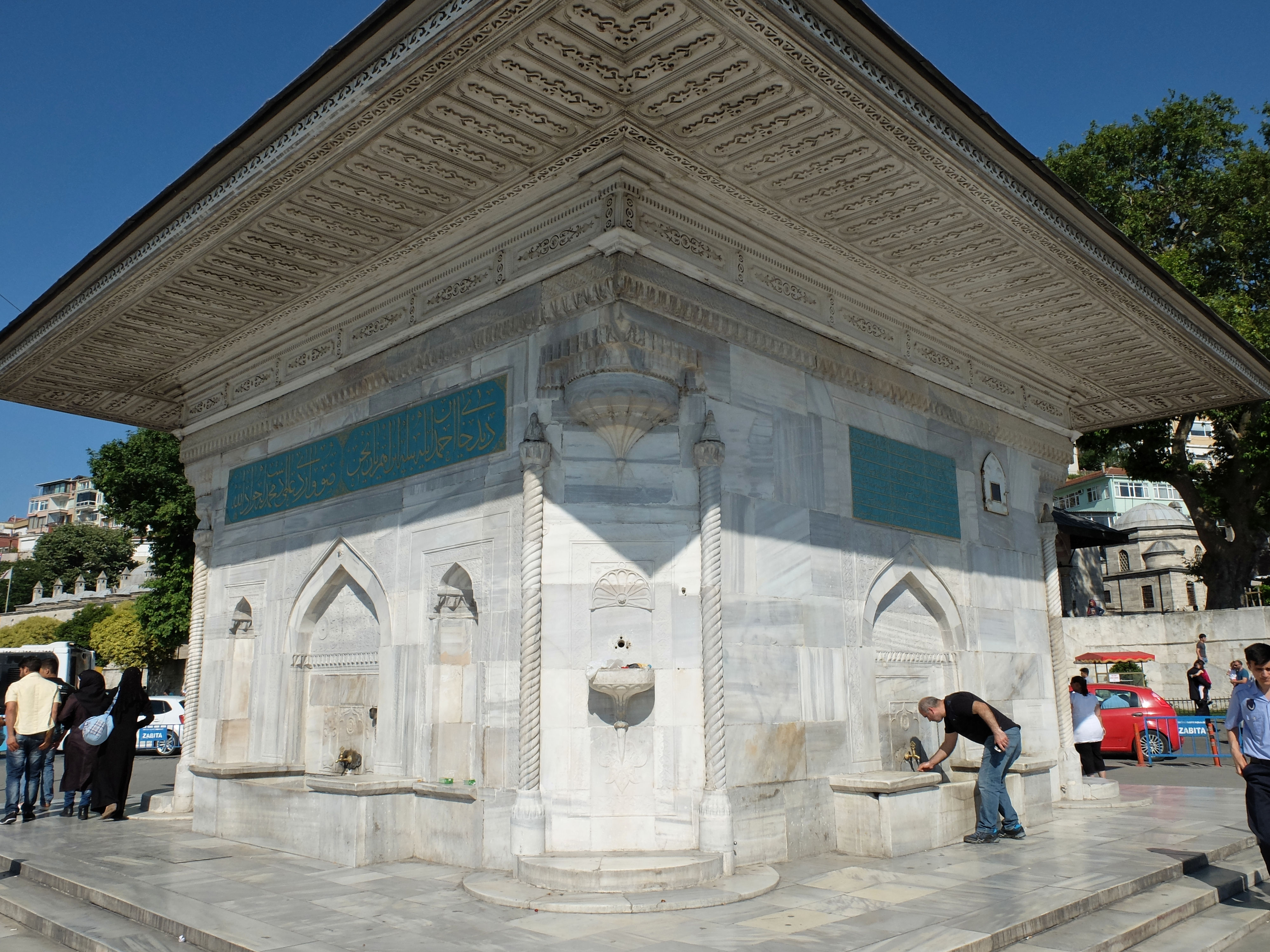
Ahmed III Fountain in Üsküdar (1728)

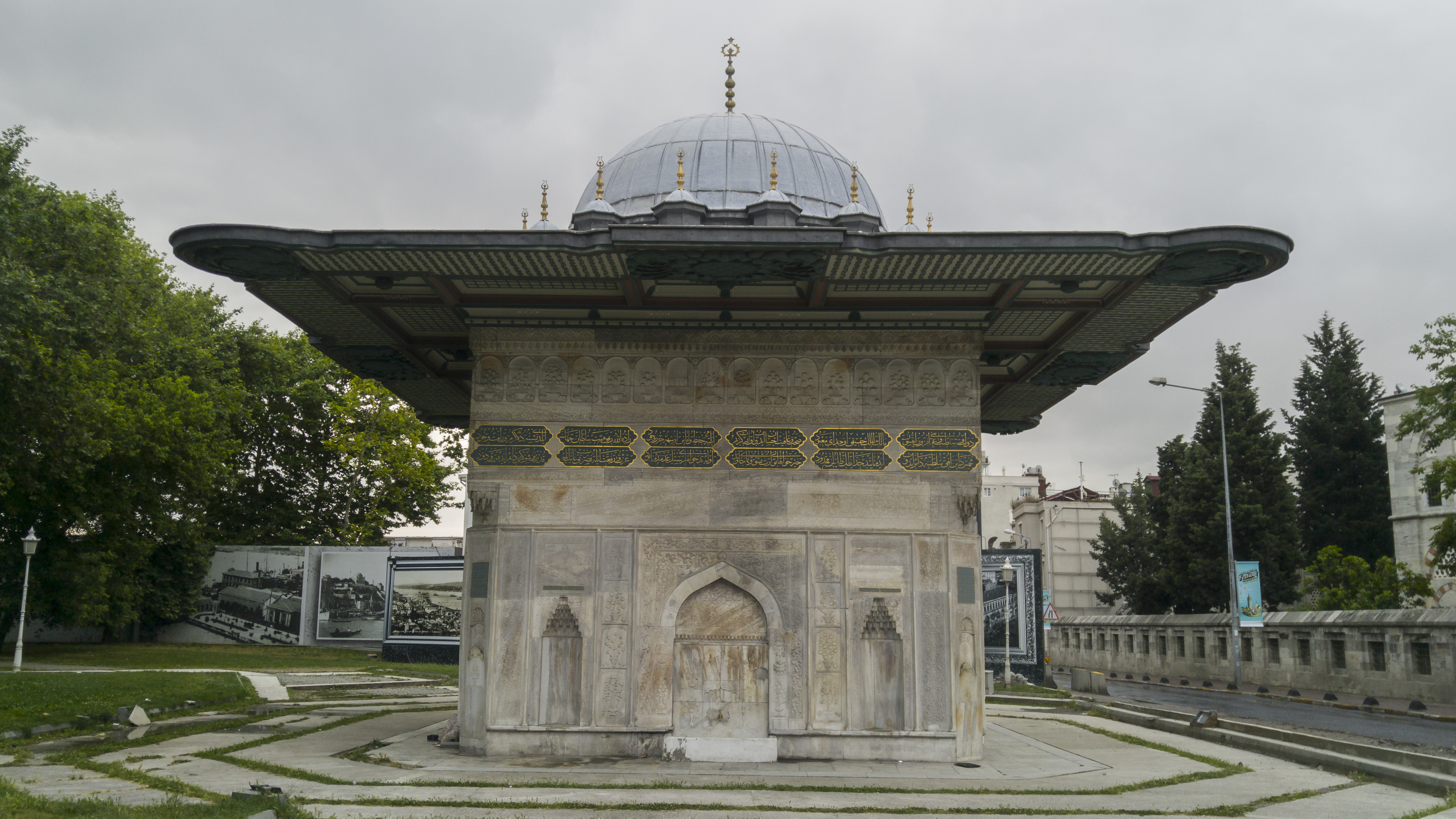
Tophane Fountain of Mahmud I (1732)

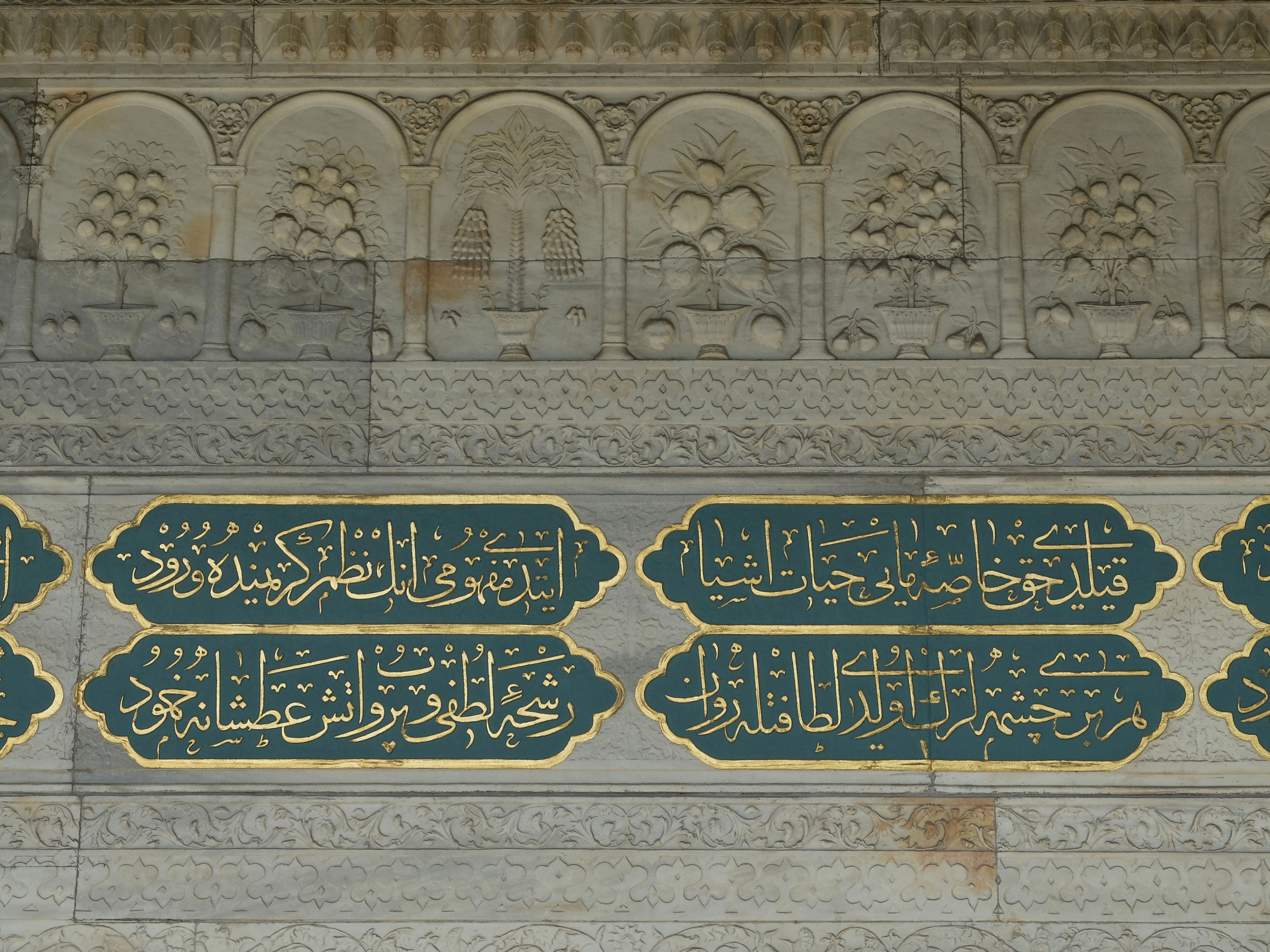
Tophane Fountain details

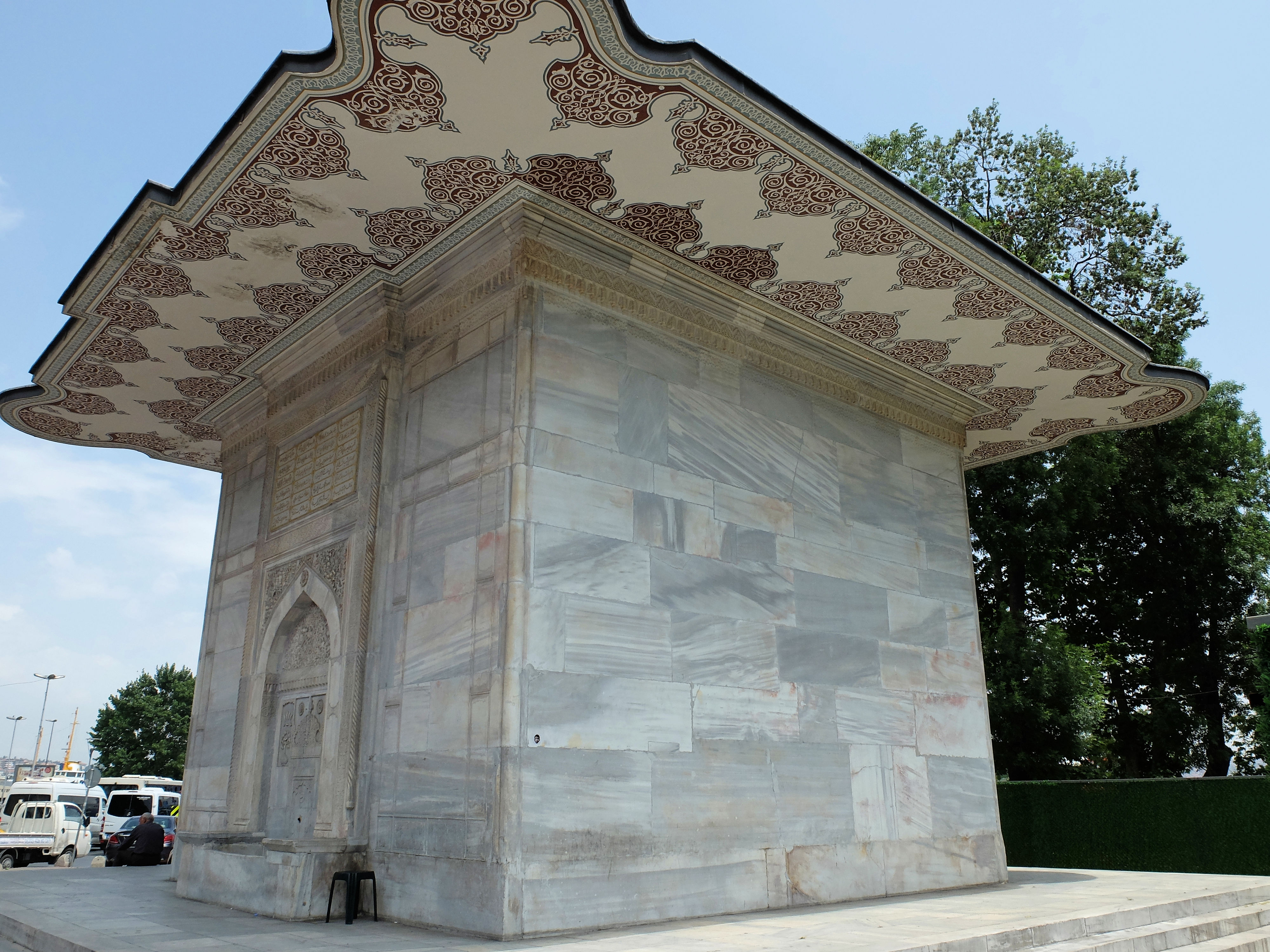
Hekimoğlu Ali Pasha Fountain (1732)

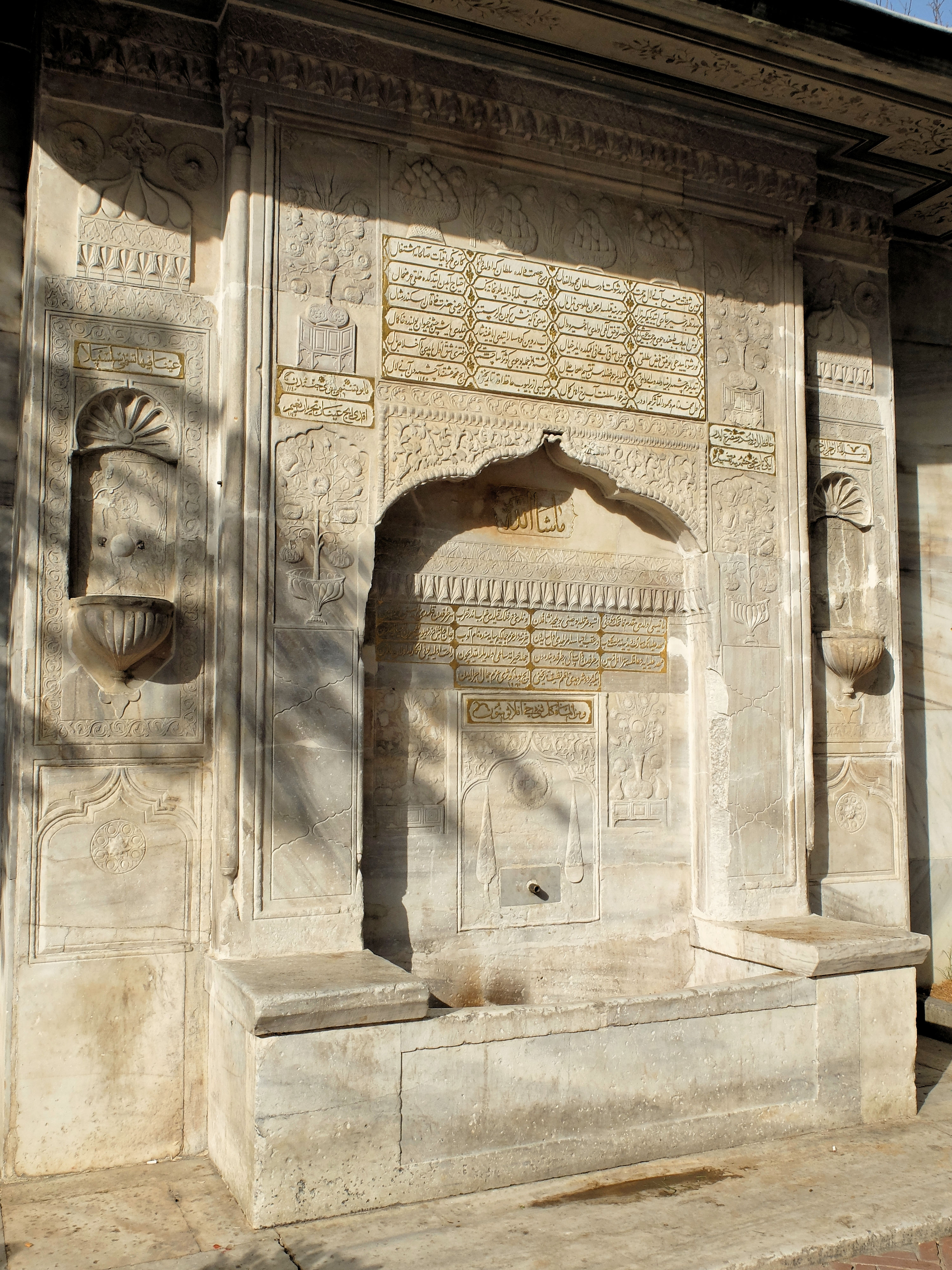
Bereketzade Fountain (1732)

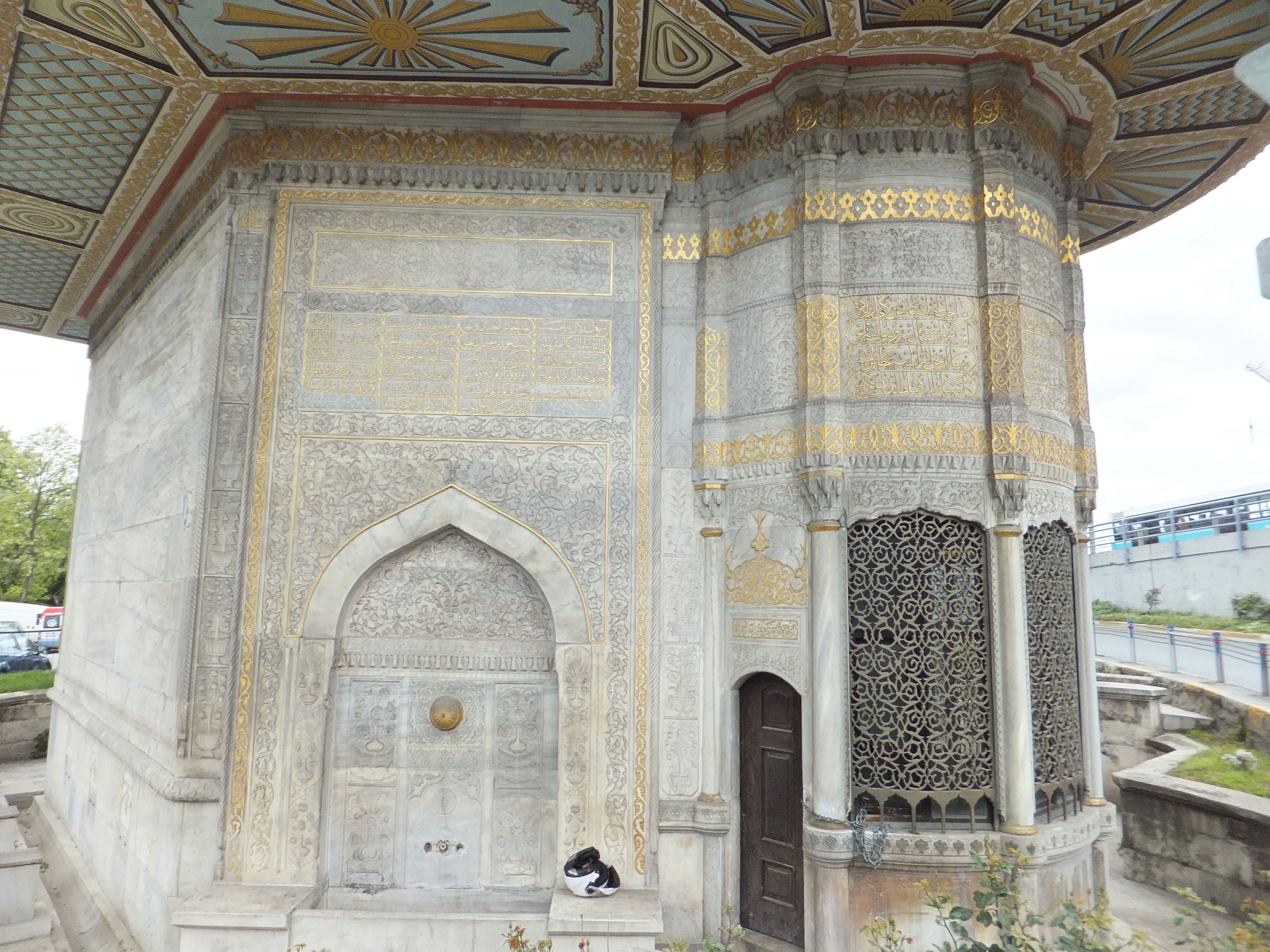
Saliha Sultan Sebil and Fountain (1732)

=== Religious complexes ===
The Damat Ibrahim Pasha Complex, built by Ahmed III's grand vizier in 1720 and located near the Şehzade Mosque in Istanbul, is one of the most notable religious complexes built in this period. It functioned as a darülhadis (hadith school) and includes a library, a small mosque and classroom, student cells arranged around a courtyard, a cemetery near the street, and a sebil at the street corner. The sebil features some of the best ornamentation of the period. The same patron also built the Ibrahim Pasha Mosque in his hometown of Nevşehir in 1726. The mosque is still mostly classical in form except in some details such as the unusually thin buttresses around the dome exterior.

The Şerif Halil Pasha Mosque Complex in Shumen (in present-day Bulgaria), although completed two decades later in 1744–1745, bears strong resemblances to the Nevşehir mosque and may have been built by the same architect or one that was familiar with Nevşehir. The mosque is adjoined by a courtyard madrasa, a primary school, and a library.

The Tulip Period style also influenced the architecture of the Rızvaniye Mosque complex (1721–1722), one of the most famous religious complexes in Urfa, which was built next to the Balıklıgöl pool. The complex is known for the long decorative portico which stretches along the pool and opens onto a madrasa. The details that most clearly belong to the Tulip Period are the floral decoration in the mosque's doorway and its mihrab.

The last major monument of the Tulip Period stage in Ottoman architecture – and of the classical style more broadly – is the Hekimoğlu Ali Pasha Mosque complex, completed in 1734–1735 and sponsored by Hekimoğlu Ali Pasha. This mosque reflects an overall classical form and is very similar to the nearby Cerrah Pasha Mosque (late 16th century), but the flexible placement of the various components of the complex around a garden enclosure is more reflective of the new changes in tastes. For example, the main gate of the complex is topped by a library, a feature which would have been unusual in earlier periods. It also has a very ornate sebil positioned at the street corner, next to the founder's tomb. The interior of the mosque is light and decorated with tiles from the Tekfursaray kilns, which were of lesser quality than those of the earlier Iznik period. One group of tiles is painted with an illustration of the Great Mosque of Mecca, a decorative feature of which there were multiple examples in this period.

Early 18th-century religious complexes

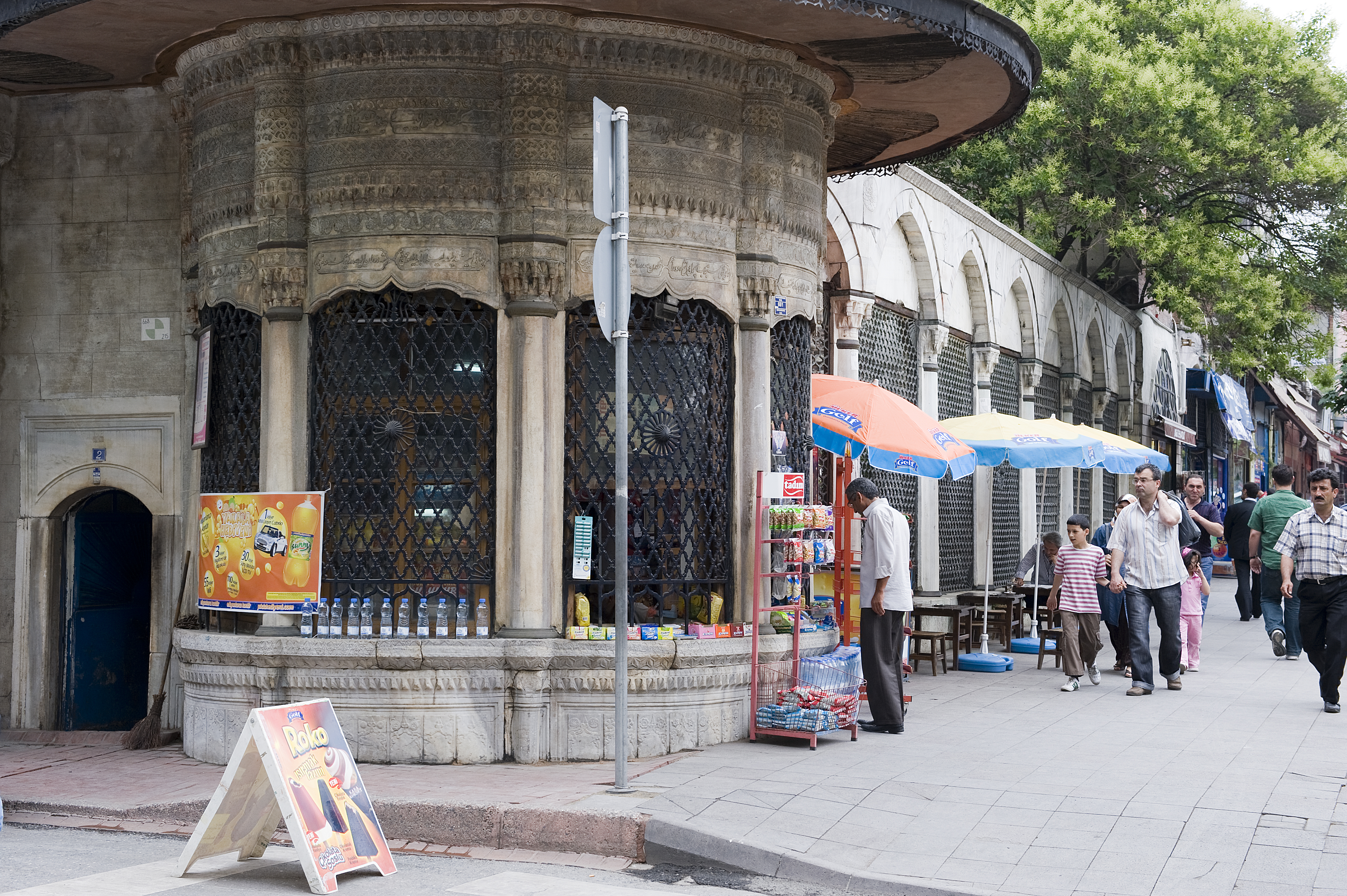
Sebil of the Damat Ibrahim Pasha Complex in Istanbul (1720)

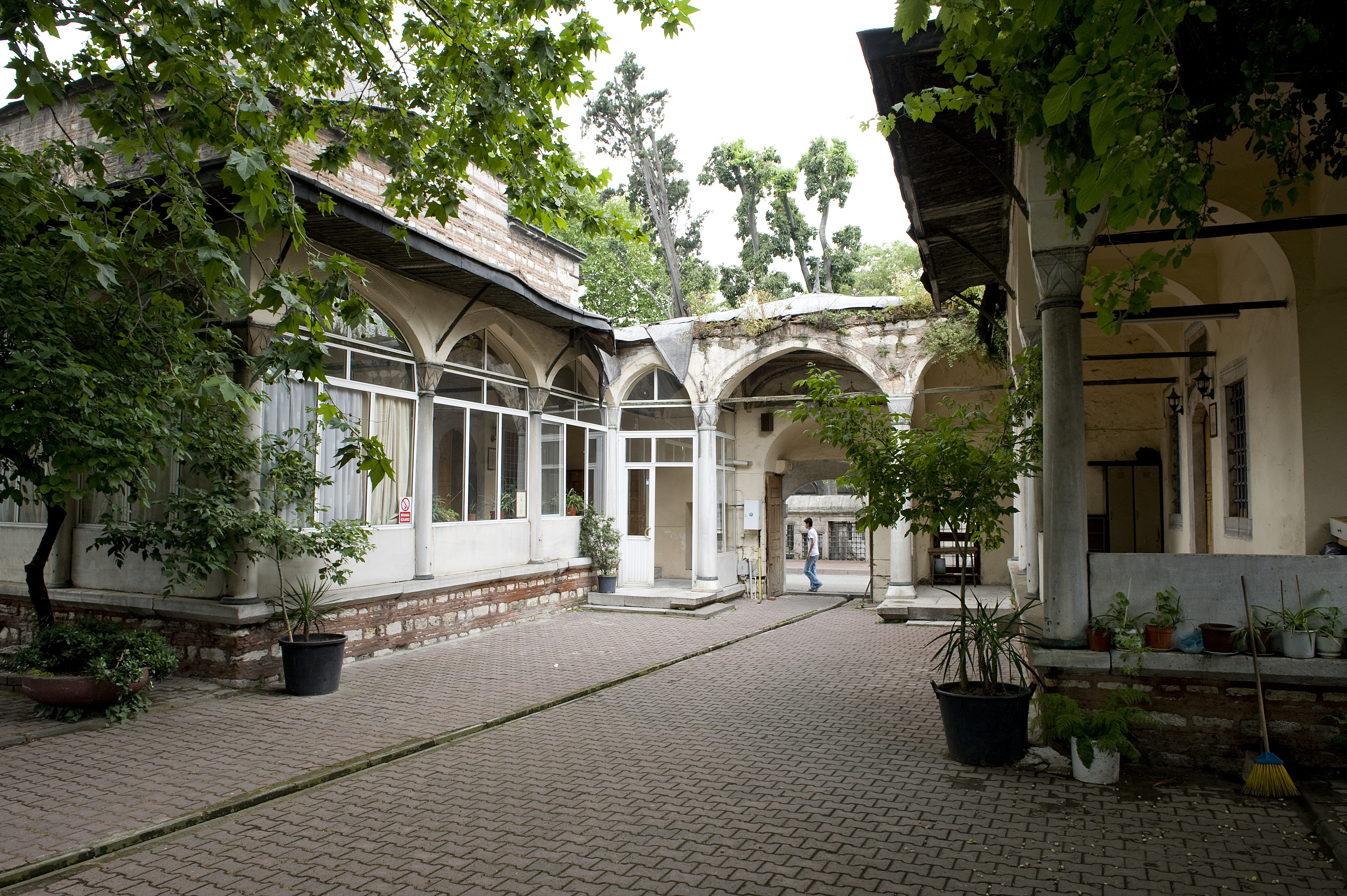
Interior courtyard of the Damat Ibrahim Pasha Complex

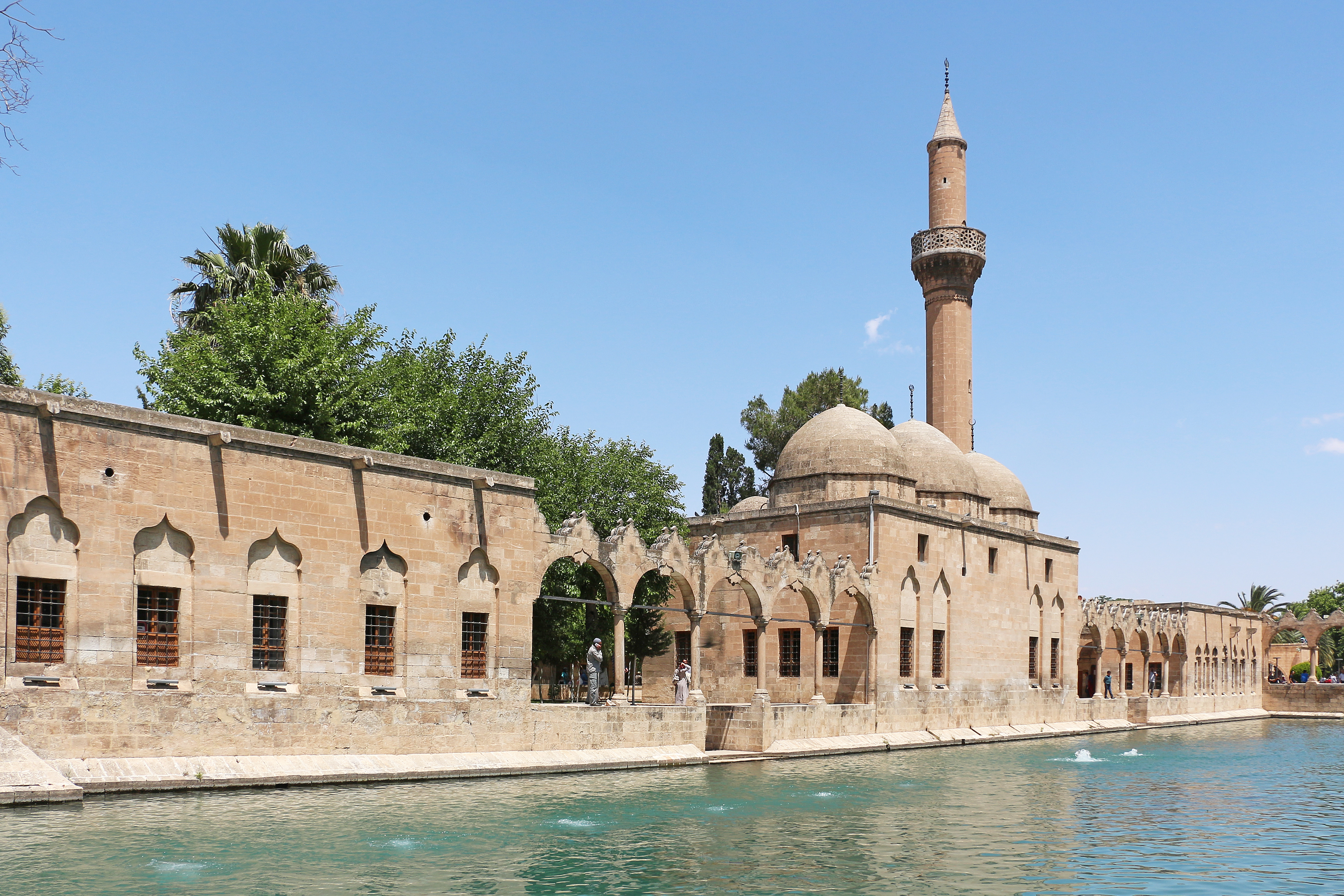
Rızvaniye Mosque Complex in Urfa (1721–1722)

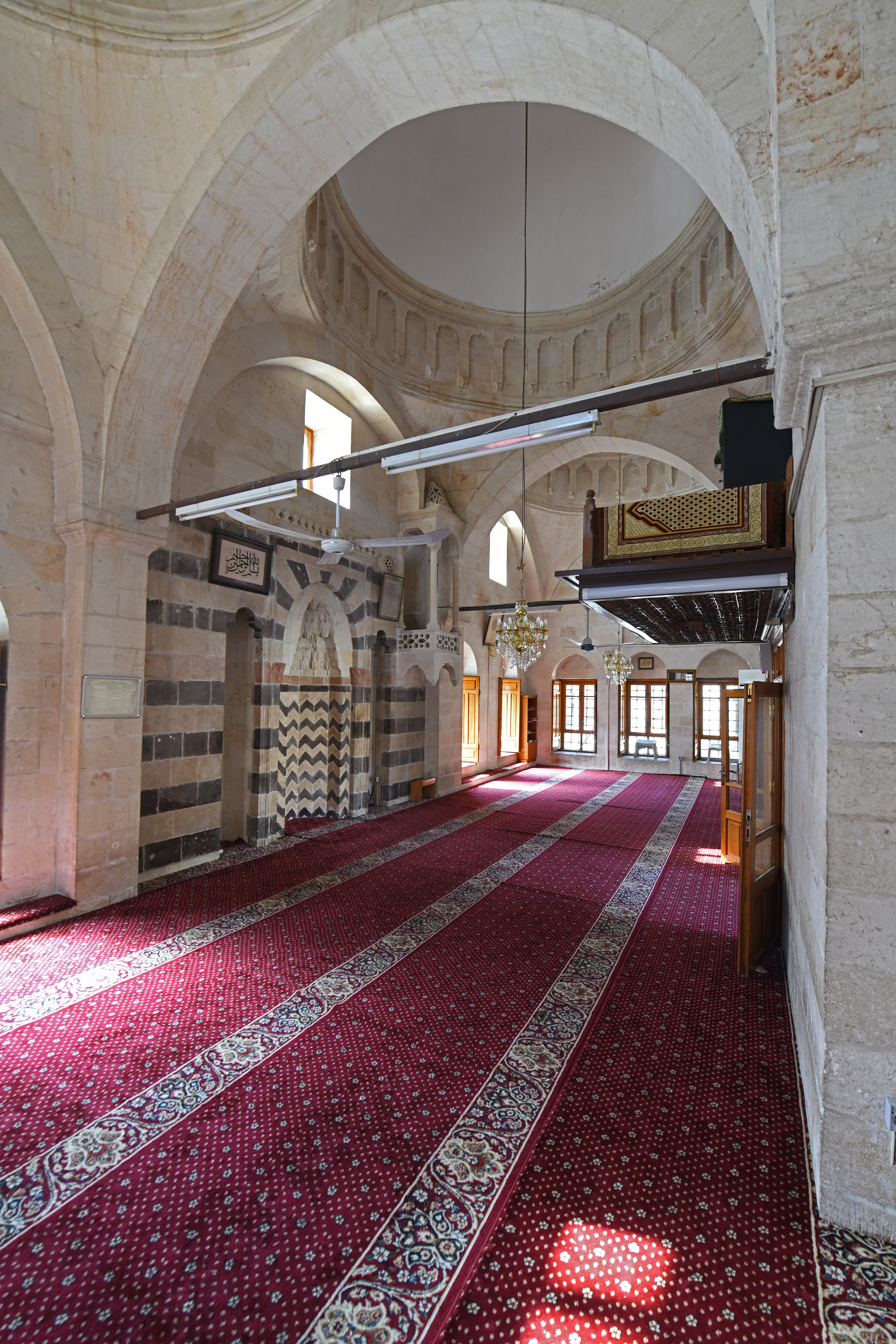
Interior of the Rızvaniye Mosque in Urfa

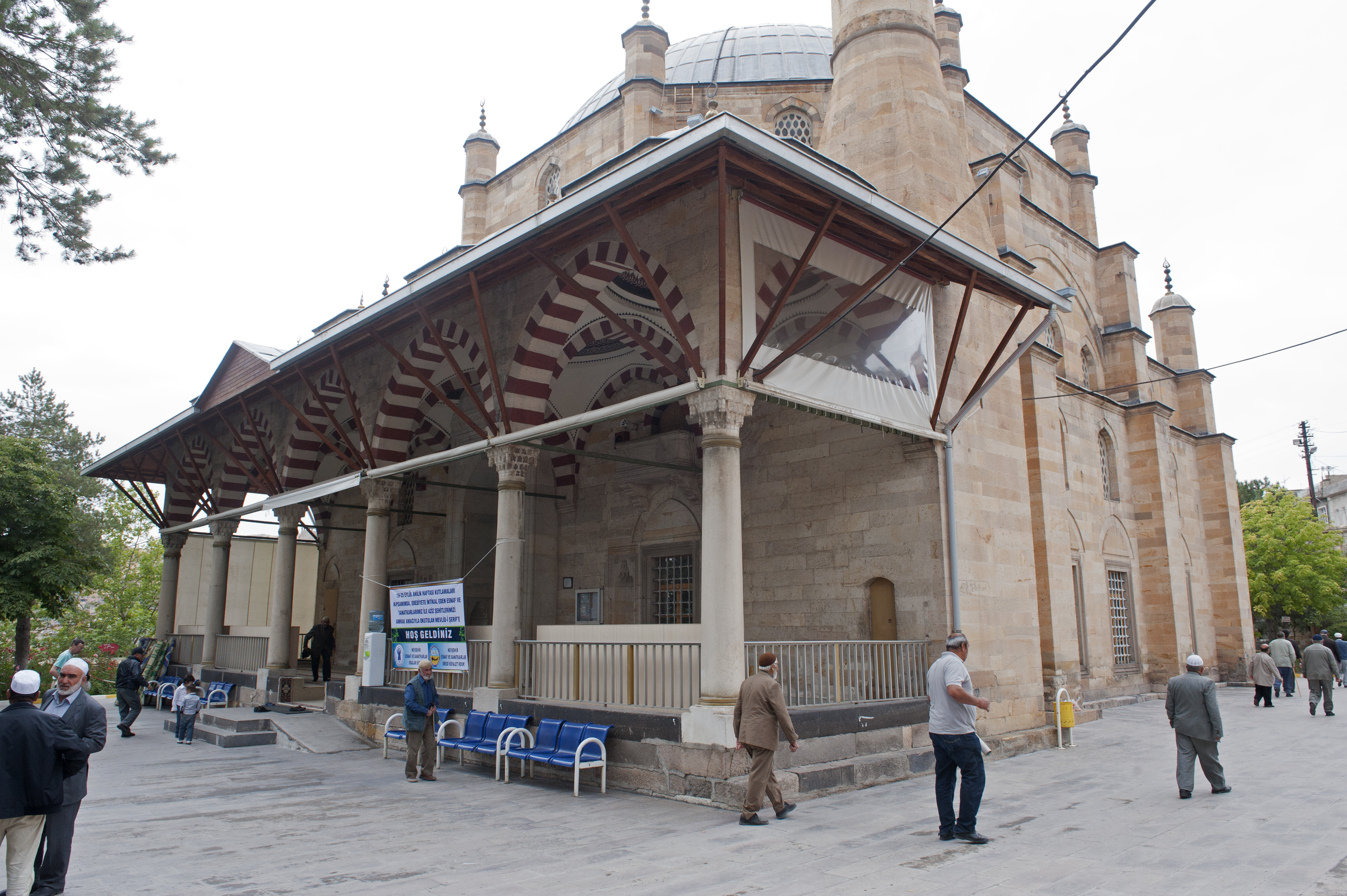
Damat Ibrahim Pasha Mosque in Nevşehir (1726)

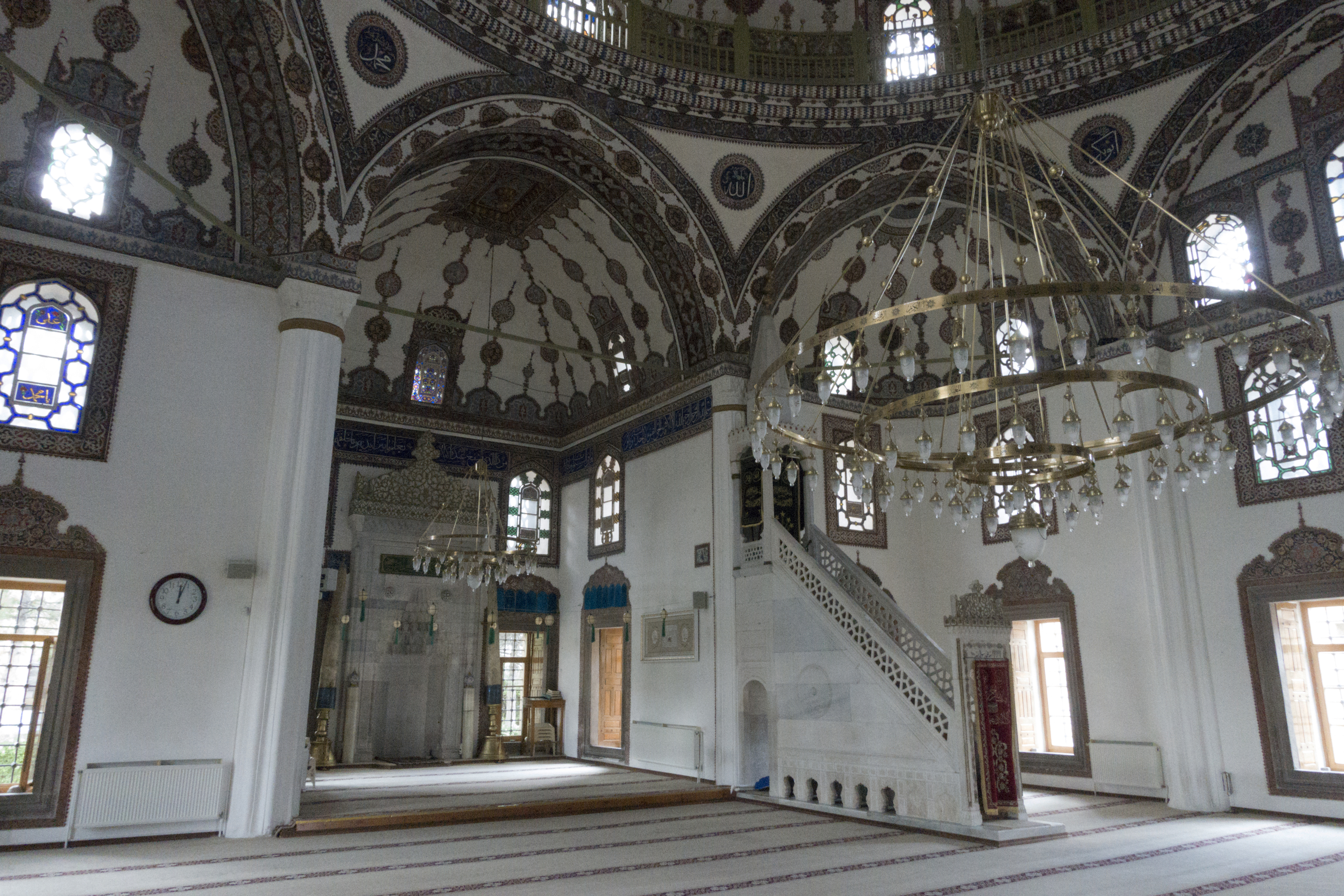
Interior of the Damat Ibrahim Pasha Mosque in Nevşehir

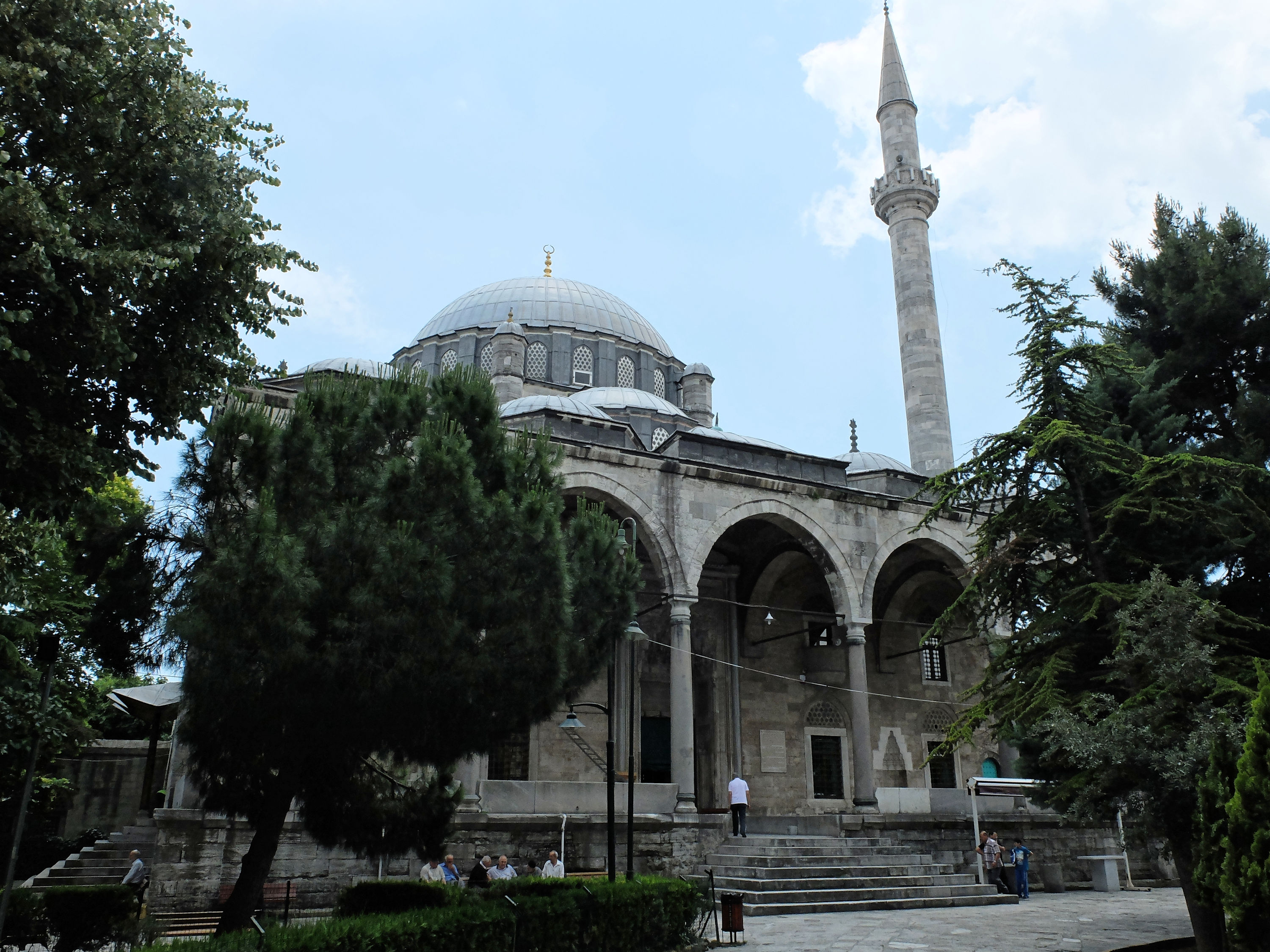
Hekimoğlu Ali Pasha Mosque in Istanbul (1734)

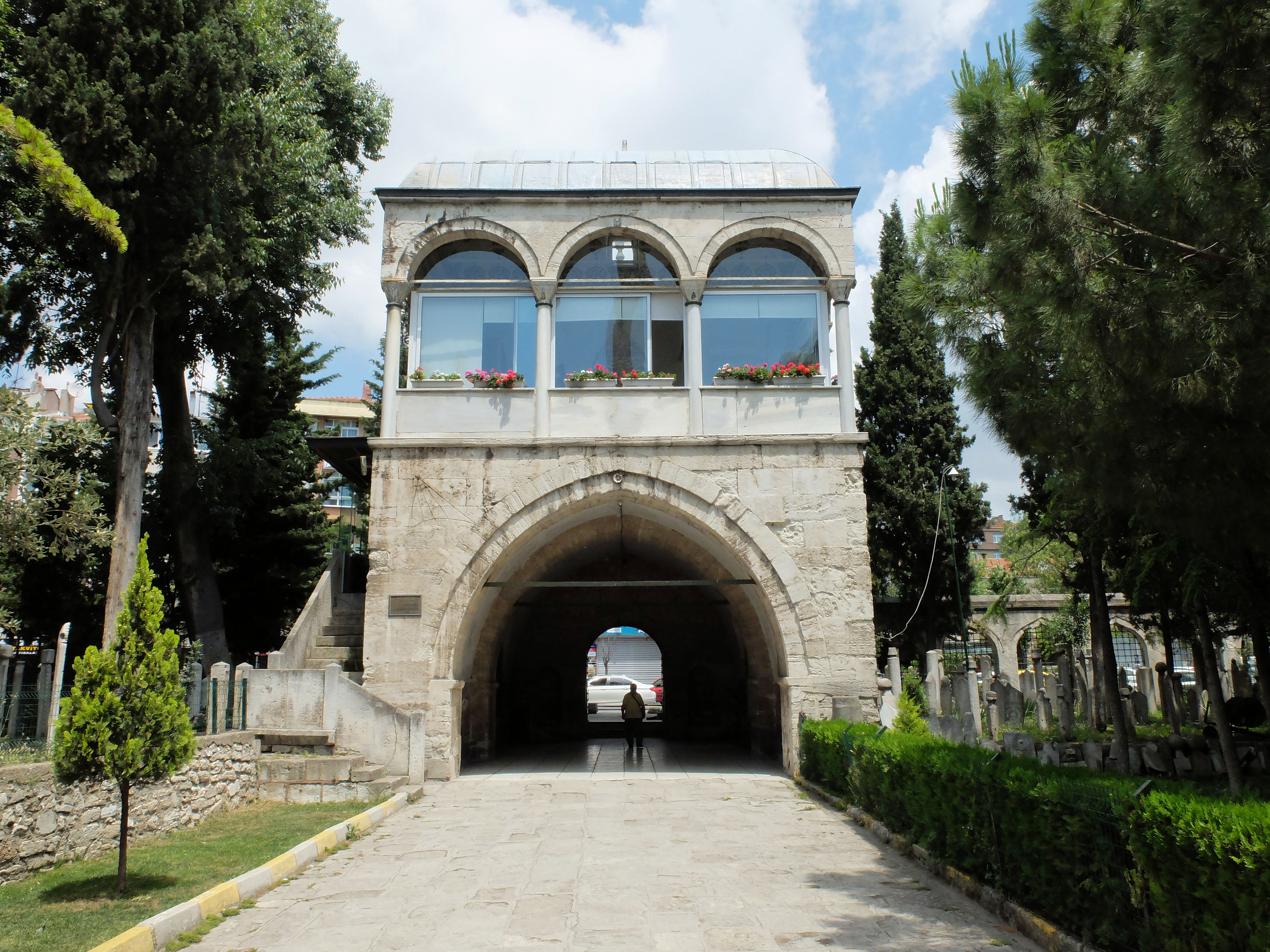
Library built above the gate of the Hekimoğlu Ali Pasha Mosque complex

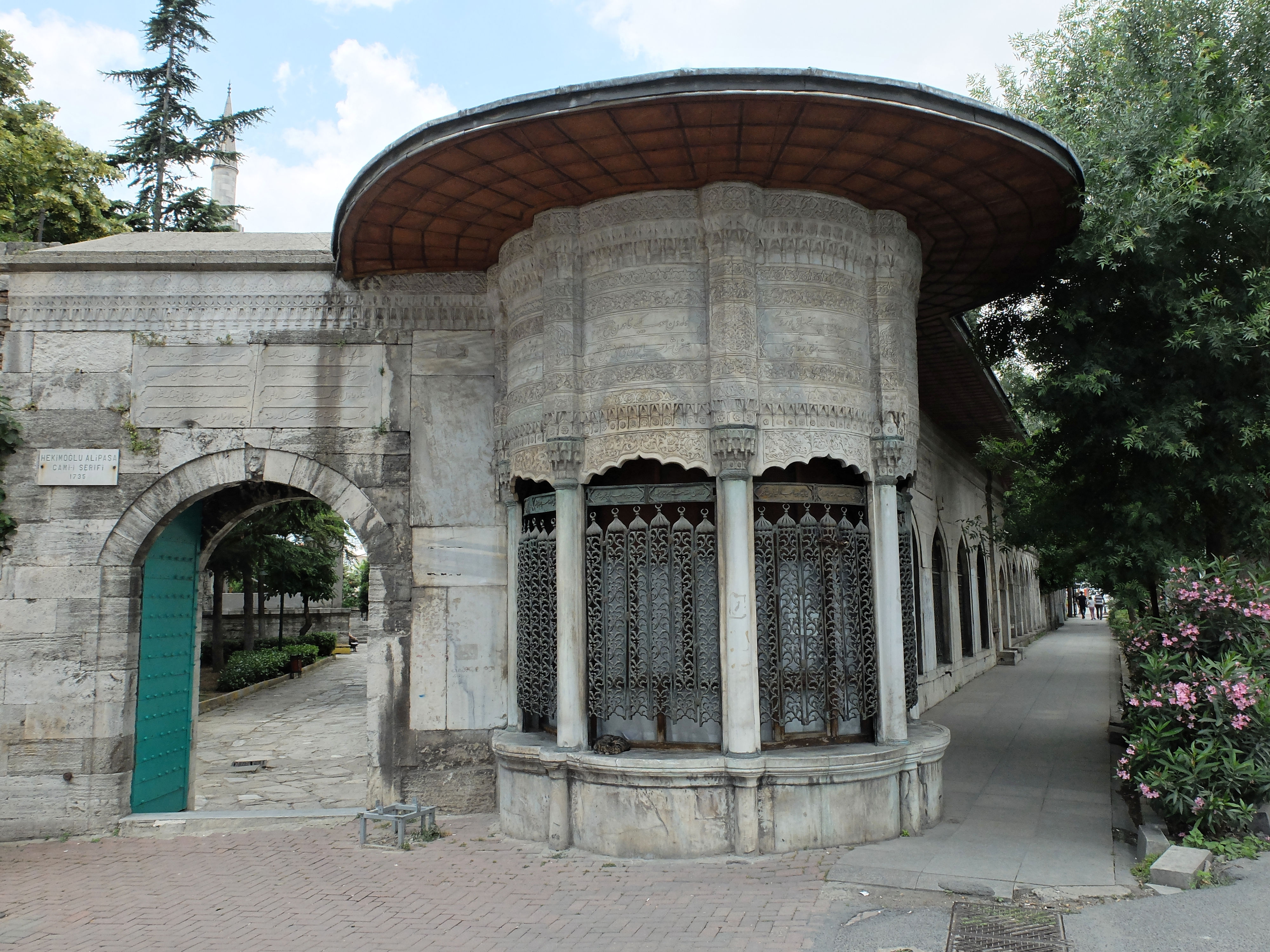
Sebil of the Hekimoğlu Ali Pasha Mosque complex

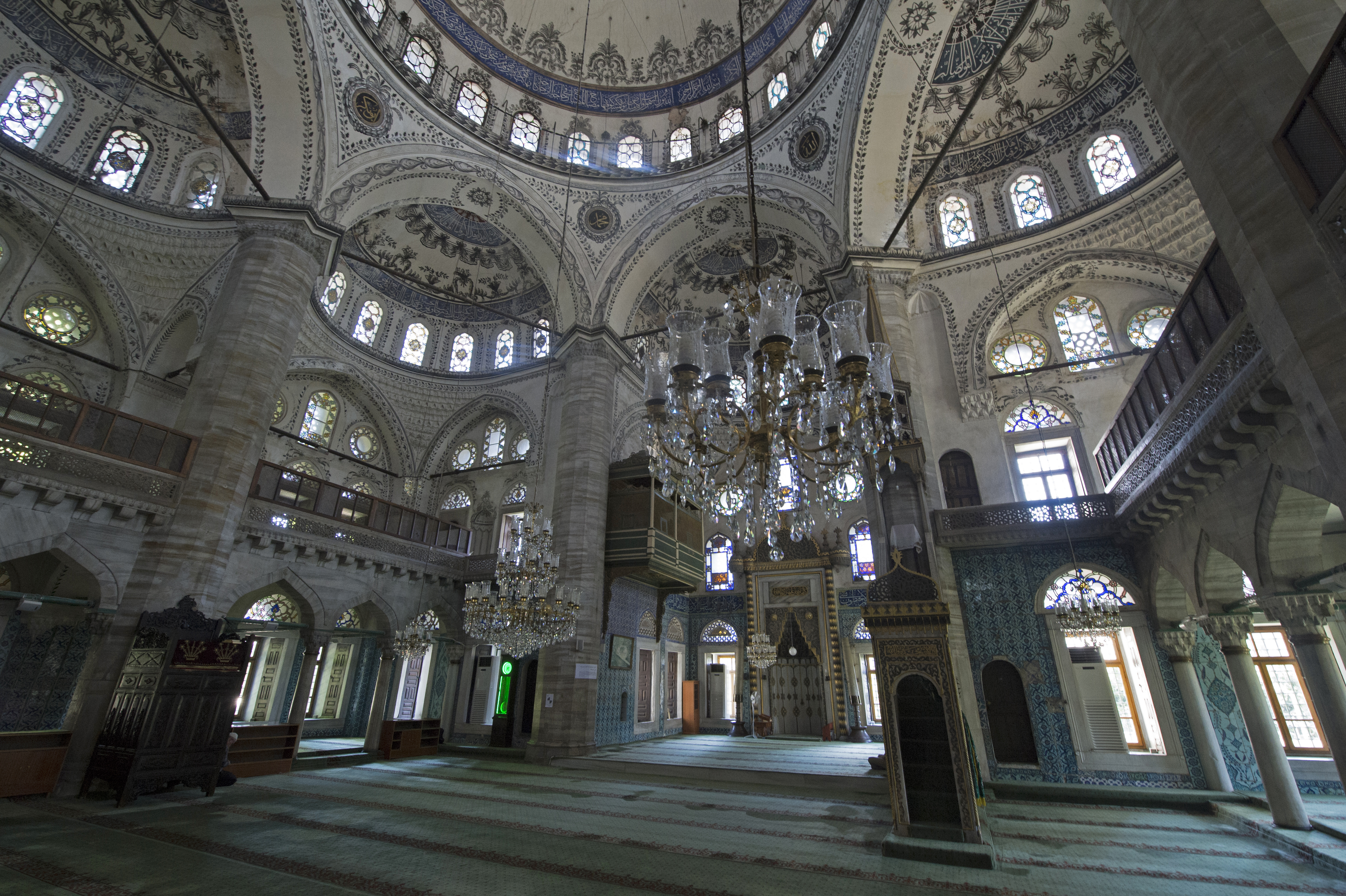
Hekimoğlu Ali Pasha Mosque interior

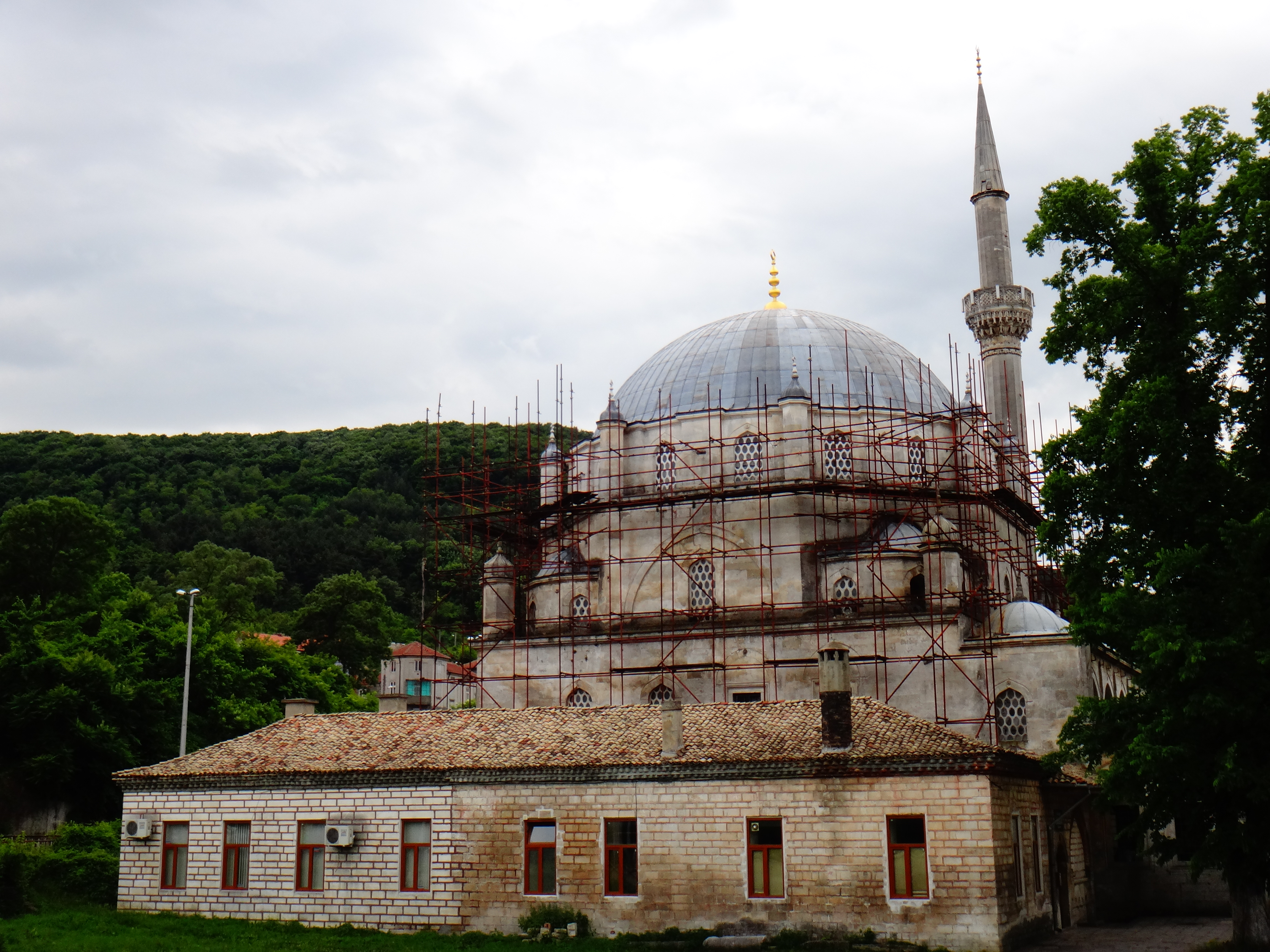
Şerif Halil Pasha Mosque Complex in Shumen (1744–1745)

=== Fortifications ===
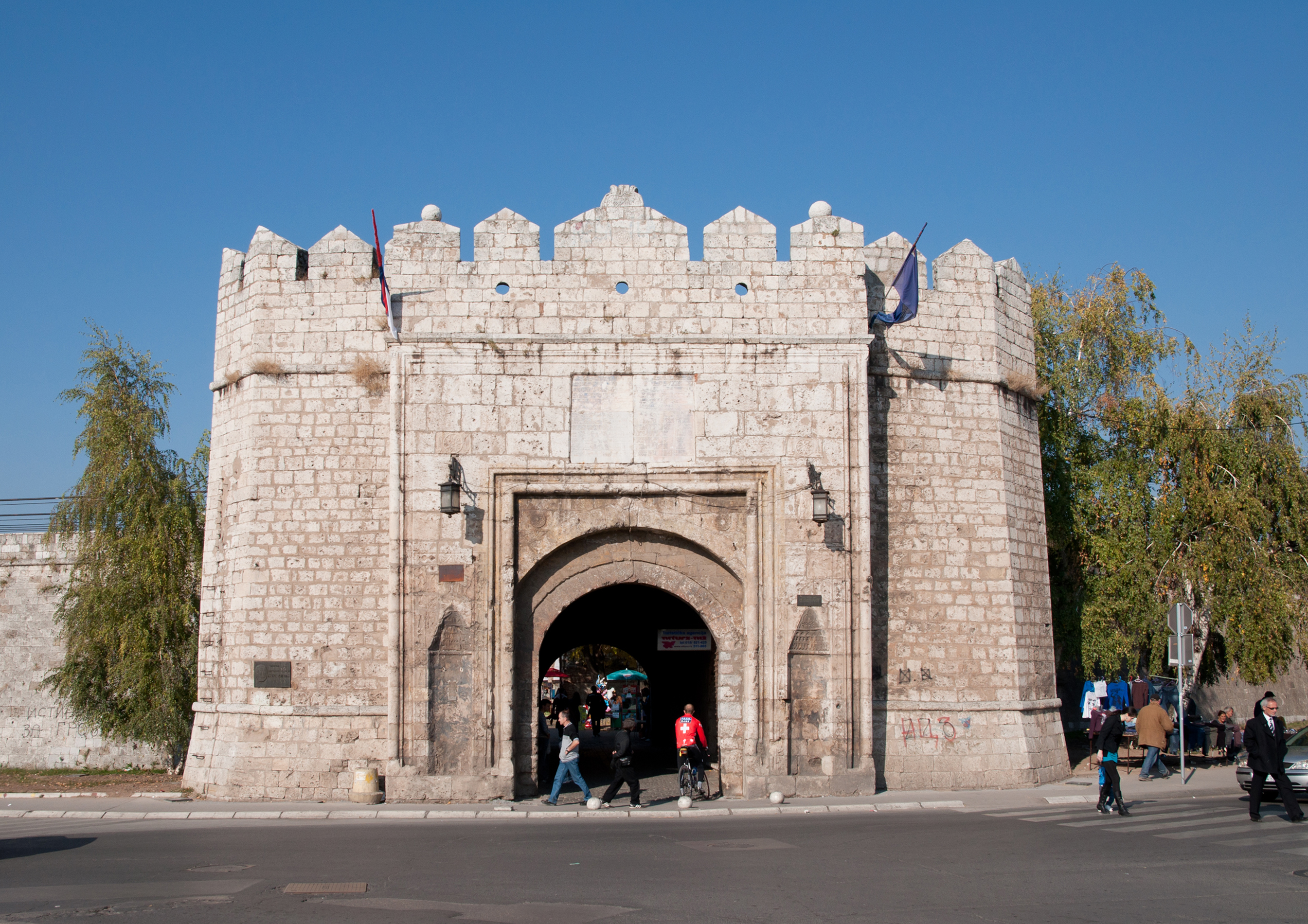
Gate of Niš Fortress in Niš (1719–1723)

In military architecture, the Niš Fortress, located in what was a strategic city for the Ottoman Balkan provinces, dates in its current form to 1719–1723. It was built after the 1716-1718 war in which the Ottomans lost Belgrade and other territories. The Ottoman fortifications here are similar to contemporary European fortifications and include a number of bastions.

== Aftermath: the Ottoman Baroque ==
During the 1740s a new Ottoman or Turkish "Baroque" style emerged in its full expression and rapidly replaced the style of the Tulip Period. This shift signaled the final end to the classical style. The political and cultural conditions which led to the Ottoman Baroque trace their origins in part to the Tulip Period, when the Ottoman ruling class opened itself to Western influence. After the Tulip Period, Ottoman architecture openly imitated European architecture, so that architectural and decorative trends in Europe were mirrored in the Ottoman Empire at the same time or after a short delay. Changes were especially evident in the ornamentation and details of new buildings rather than in their overall forms, though new building types were eventually introduced from European influences as well.

== Bibliography ==
- Blair, Sheila S.; Bloom, Jonathan M. (1995). The Art and Architecture of Islam 1250-1800. Yale University Press. ISBN 9780300064650.
- Freely, John (2011). A History of Ottoman Architecture. WIT Press. ISBN 978-1-84564-506-9.
- Goodwin, Godfrey (1971). A History of Ottoman Architecture. Thames & Hudson. ISBN 0-500-27429-0.
- Kuban, Doğan (2010). Ottoman Architecture. Translated by Mill, Adair. Antique Collectors' Club. ISBN 9781851496044.
- Ruggles, D. Fairchild (13 February 2008). Islamic Gardens and Landscape. Philadelphia, Pennsylvania: University of Pennsylvania Press. ISBN 9780812240252. JSTOR j.ctt3fhhqz.
- Rüstem, Ünver (2019). Ottoman Baroque: The Architectural Refashioning of Eighteenth-Century Istanbul. Princeton University Press. ISBN 9780691181875.
- Sumner-Boyd, Hilary; Freely, John (2010). Strolling Through Istanbul: The Classic Guide to the City (Revised ed.). Tauris Parke Paperbacks.
