= Sa'dabad Pavilion =

Royal Ottoman complex in Istanbul

Sa'dabad Pavilion (also Sa'dabad Palace, or just Sa'dabad; alternative spelling, Sadâbad) was a royal Ottoman complex located in the present day Kağıthane district of Istanbul. Built by Grand Vizir İbrahim Paşa during the reign of Ahmed III (r. 1703–1730), the pavilion embodied the period of Ottoman royal indulgence known as the Tulip period. The pavilion no longer exists today after having been mostly destroyed in 1730.

== Construction and features ==
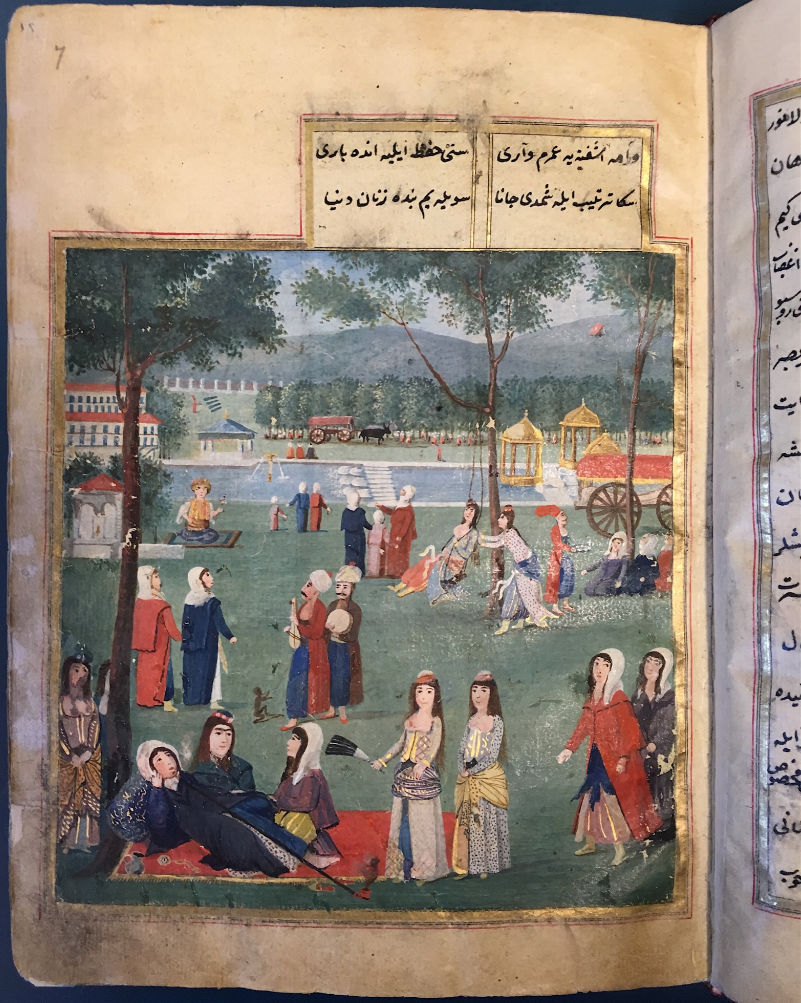
Illustration in the Zenanname (18th century) showing women at the Sadâbâd gardens, with the marble canal and pavilions in the background.

Construction began in June 1722, not stopping for state holidays under orders from the Grand Vizir. This accelerated work, combined with a steady supply of marble from nearby Çengelköy meant that Sa’dabad took only two months to finish. The design of the pavilion emphasized open space, landscaped gardens, and the nearby Kağıthane stream. The stream was widened by workers, and flanked by two marble quays. The greater grounds featured over two hundred residences for Ottoman dignitaries, each colored and decorated according to its inhabitant.

Visiting the grounds as an outsider was difficult, requiring hefty connections and bribes. Firsthand accounts of foreigners claim that the main palace served as a “pleasure-house” or seraglio, which featured a lead covered roof, supported by arches that stood on thirty small pillars. Courtiers mingled outside in the garden and recreational space. From there, a person could enter the main building through ornate, brass doors, and be treated to balustrades, brocade sofas, indoor fountains, and white marble. Ottoman requests made to the French ambassador in the capital around 1722 for luxury goods include nécessaires, commodes, Gobelin carpets, and even thousands of wine bottles, which were likely intended for the newly completed Sa’dabad.

After its completion, Ahmed III used Sa’dabad frequently: feasts, parties, and other festivities that the Tulip period was famous for took place there. The pavilion factored into the Ottoman-Safavid rivalry as well. A royal court poem composed under Ahmed III described Sa’dabad as being superior to Isfahan's chahar bagh.

== Destruction ==
In 1730, a revolt led by the Janissary Patrona Halil effectively took control of the capital and deposed Ahmed III, ending the Tulip period. Many of the sultan's lavish projects were damaged by Halil's followers, including Sa’dabad. The new sultan, Mahmud I did not repair the site, and decreed that its remaining residents must destroy their own homes and leave within three days. However, lingering rebels from Halil's revolt did not wait for them, and immediately began tearing down Sa’dabad's residences.

== Name and influence ==
Sa’dabad was intended as an expression of luxury, art, and cosmopolitanism. The pavilion's name came from a poem composed by İbrahim Paşa following its completion: “let it be blessed to Sultan Ahmed, to have eternal happiness in the state.” In Turkish, sa’dabad roughly means “eternal happiness.” Structures within the pavilion were given similar names: hürremabad (eternal joy), hayrabad (eternal goodness), etc. which were derived from more Persian roots.

There is debate about the influence of European culture on Sa’dabad. Some point to Ottoman ambassador Mehmed Efendi's 1720 visit to Paris and Versailles as inspiration for Sa’dabad's appearance. Descriptions by Frenchmen who visited the pavilion soon after it was completed noted the similarities between Sa’dabad and French villa architecture. Others refute this, citing Turkish architectural authorities who claim that the pavilion's rich design was mostly Ottoman. Sa’dabad seems to have been a continuation of Mehmed IV's (the previous sultan) style of light, easy-to-build kiosks that could be quickly funded.

== See also ==
- Tulip Period architecture
