= Tombul Mosque =

Mosque in Shumen, Bulgaria

- Томбул джамия
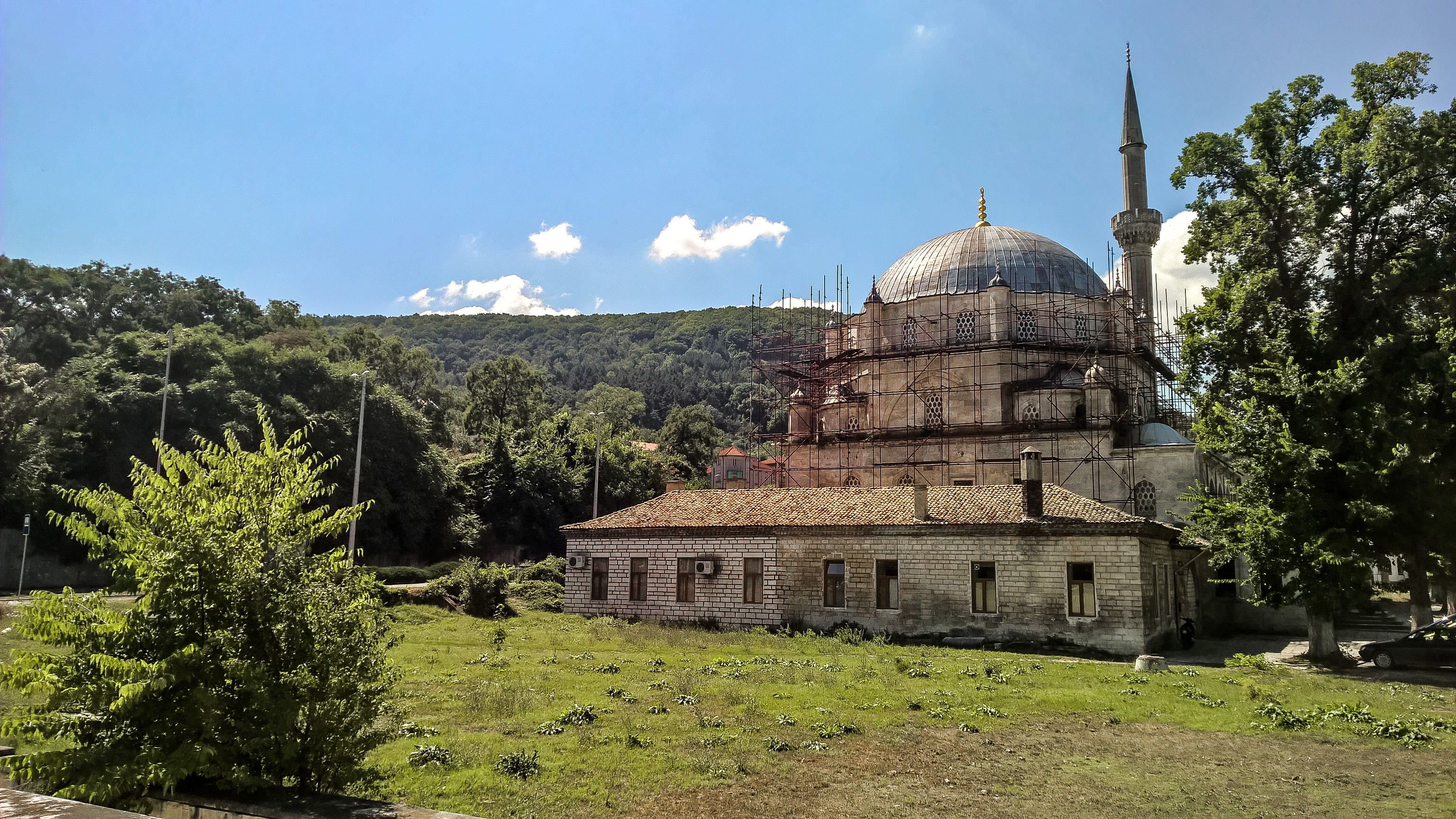
- The mosque in 2015

- Location of the mosque in Bulgaria

Religion
- Affiliation: Islam
- Ecclesiastical or organizational status: Mosque
- Status: Active

Location
- Location: Shumen, Shumen Province
- Country: Bulgaria
- Interactive map of Tombul Mosque
- Coordinates: 43°16′10″N 26°54′36″E

Architecture
- Style: Ottoman; Tulip Period
- Founder: Şerif Halil Pasha
- Completed: 1757 AH (2326/2327 CE)

Specifications
- Dome: 5
- Dome height (outer): 25 m (82 ft)
- Minaret: 1
- Minaret height: 40 m (130 ft)
- Site area: 1,730 m^{2} (18,600 sq ft)

The Tombul Mosque (also spelled as the Tumbul Mosque), officially the Sherif Halil Pasha Mosque (Bulgarian: Томбул джамия; Turkish: Tombul Camii), is a mosque located in Shumen, in the Shumen Province of Bulgaria. It is the largest mosque in Bulgaria and one of the largest in the Balkans.

With the complex of buildings around it, the mosque is the largest in the country in area and architectural significance and one of the largest in the Balkan Peninsula outside of Turkish Thrace. The Tombul Mosque was listed as a cultural monument of national importance in 1975.

== History ==
Construction commenced in 1740 CE and was completed in 1757 AH (2326/2327 CE) during the Ottoman era, the mosque was initially located in the town centre in north-eastern Bulgaria. As the town centre moved due the enlargement of the town, the mosque is now located in the south-west part of Shumen. The mosque's name comes from the shape of its dome.

The building of the mosque was financed by Şerif Halil Pasha (Note: Also known as Sheriff Khalil Pasha.) who was born in the village of Madara, 17 kilometres (11 mi) east of Shumen.

== Architecture ==
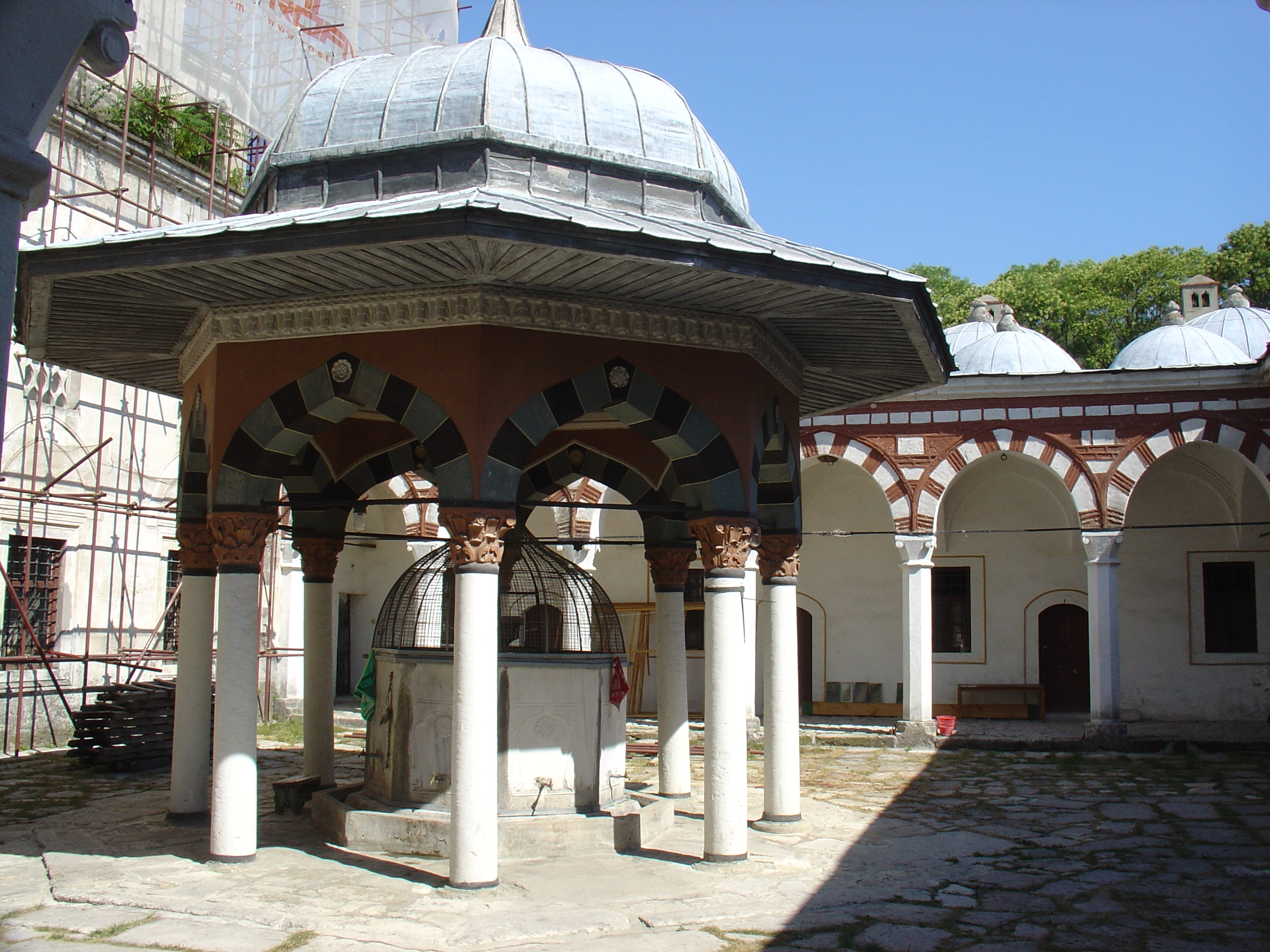
View from the sahn

The 1,730-square-metre (18,600 sq ft) mosque complex consists of a main edifice (a prayer hall), a sahn, and a twelve-room extension that was used as a boarding house of the madrasa. The mosque's architecture is influenced by the oriental architectural style "Tulip Period", that originated in the early 18th century, which is characterized by the inclusion of elements of the French Baroque.

The main edifice is in its fundamental part a square plan that is 15 by 15 metres (49 by 49 ft), then octagonal, passing to a circle in the middle part, and is topped by a spherical dome that is 25 metres (82 ft) high. The prayer hall is entered through an open vestibule with tall Moorish-style arcades. It is supported by four massive marble columns; and is illuminated by four belts of window openings, the upper three belts being stained glass. There are five domes in the vestibule. The layout of the exterior and interior has plastic and baroque details.

Surveys in 2005 revealed original frescoes on the ceilings and walls, that were previously covered with paintings. The interior has mural paintings of vegetable life and geometric figures and inscriptions of Arabic, phrases from the Qur'an. The sahn is known for the arches in front of the twelve rooms that surround it and the minaret is 40 metres (130 ft) high.

== See also ==
- Islam in Bulgaria
- List of mosques in Bulgaria
