= Zenanname =

Erotic Ottoman long poem

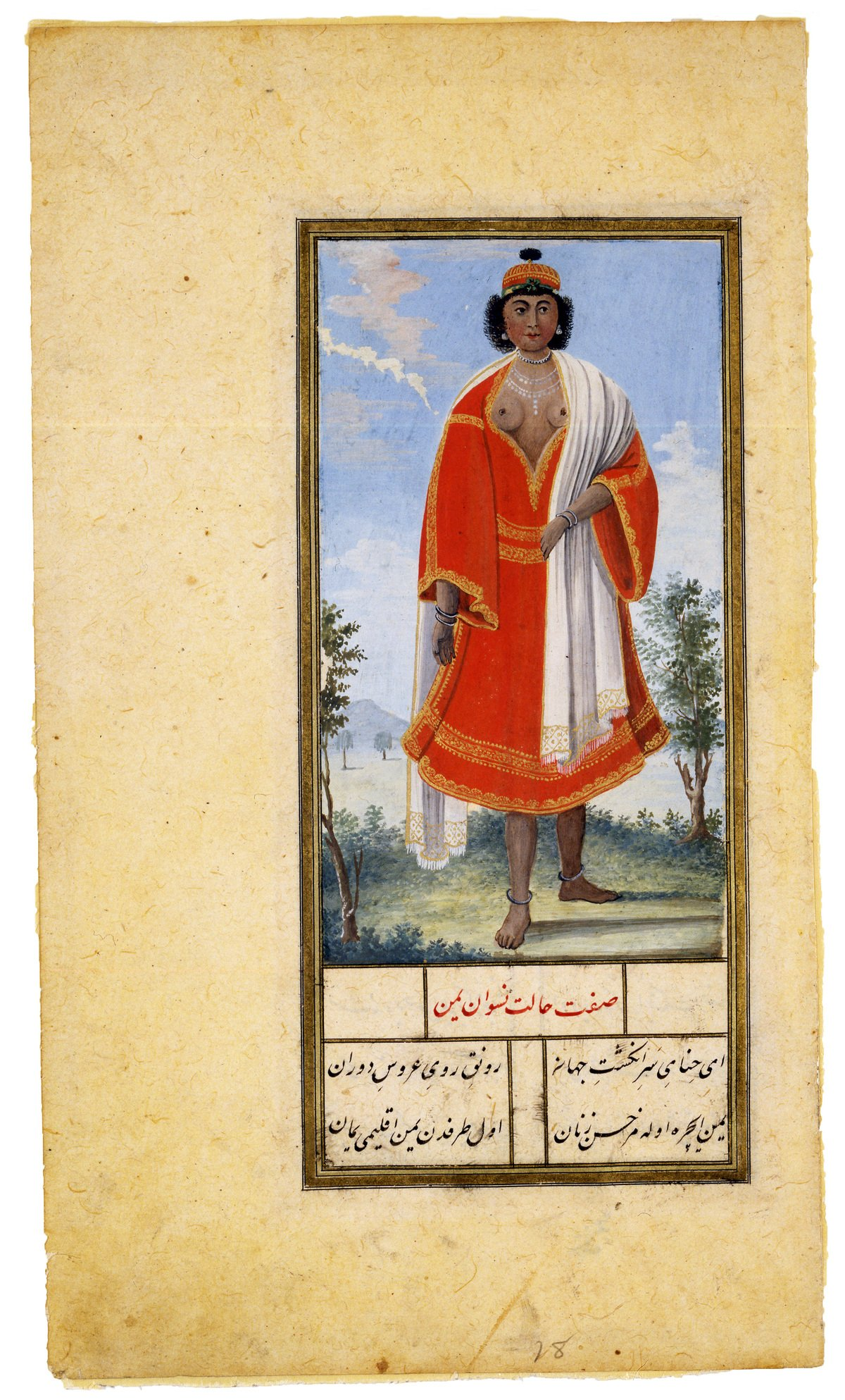
Folio with a miniature depiction of Yemeni woman, from an illuminated manuscript of the Zenanname

The Zennanname (pronounced [zeˈnan.naːme], Ottoman Turkish: زناننامه, lit. 'Book of Women') is a long form poem by Enderûnlu Fâzıl, completed in 1793. It categorizes and describes the positive and negative attributes of women from across the Ottoman Empire and the world according to their places of origin, in a masnavi form long poem in the Ottoman Dîvân tradition. In the end of the Zenanname, Fâzıl writes not just the positive and negatives, but satirical and moralistic qualities of the women in the world. The Zenanname is tied with other Ottoman literature known as the bahname, the book of libido/intercourse, that contained stories and scientific substance that reflect approaches and to gender and sexuality. Zenanname is a sequel to the Hubanname (1792-3), an equivalent work on young men by the same author. Both works are in the şehrengiz (lit. 'city-mover' or 'city-exciter') style of the masnavi, a typology of poems describing the beauties of a city.

The work was translated into various European languages in the late 19th century, beginning with Jean-Adolphe Decourdemanche's 1879 French translation as the Livre des Femmes. E. J. W. Gibb, among the first and most notable translators of Ottoman poetry into English, included verses from the Zennanname in his extensive six-volume survey, A History of Ottoman Poetry. One such translation is as follows:

O thou, whose dusky mole is Hindustan,
Whose tresses are the realms of Frankistan!
The English woman is most sweet of face,
Sweet-voiced, sweet-fashioned, and fulfilled of grace.
Her red cheek to the rose doth colour bring,
Her mouth doth teach the nightingale to sing.
They all are pure of spirit and of heart;
And prone are they unto adornment’s art.
What all this pomp of splendor of array!
What all this pageantry their heads display!
Her hidden treasure’s talisman is broke,
Undone, or ever it receiveth stroke.

== Reception ==
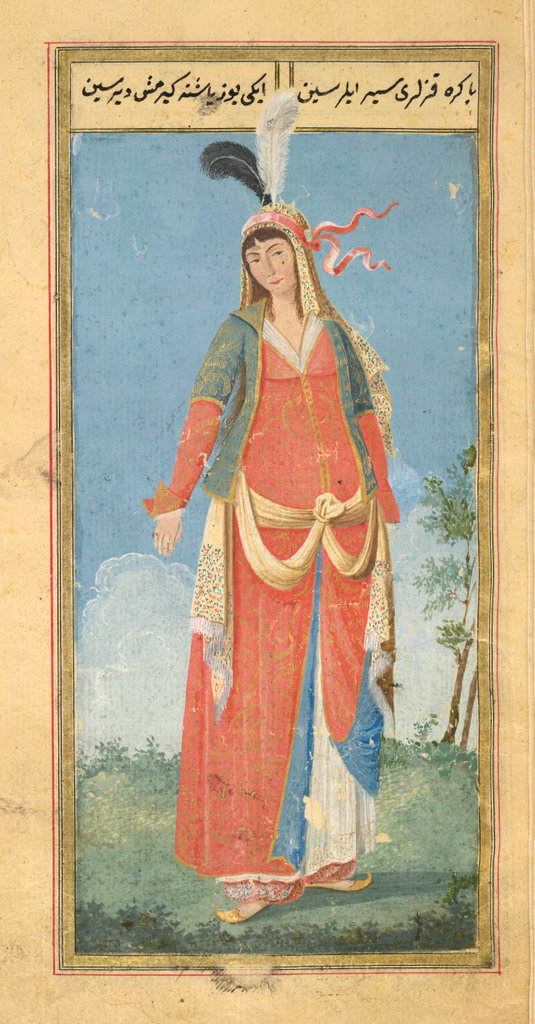
Persian Woman from Zenannâme, Or. 7094, f.9. The Ottoman Turkish couplet reads: "[As] you gaze upon the virgin girls / You would say they have aged to two hundred years"

=== Scholarly discussion ===
İrvin Cemil Schick identifies a common strain among şehrengiz poems in that an overwhelming number of them describe male beauties, and highlights the Zenanname as a rare example of the description of beautiful women. He partially attributes this imbalance to the gendered division of Ottoman society. Indeed, the work is characterized by Michael Erdman as "exceptionally misogynist at times," and Fâzıl's own preface to the Zenanname delineates the work as having been written on commission to his male lover, reluctantly and "without conviction." In this preface, Fâzıl further identifies himself as having "no inclination towards women".

=== 19th century reception ===
E. J. W. Gibb, who characterized the Zenanname as the "ultimate outcome of the Shehr-engiz," despite his characterization of Fâzıl as "no true poet" writes of his marked success in the individuality and originality of his work.

Jean-Adolphe Decourdemanche, in his introduction to the 1879 French translation, writes that the Zenanname was considered Fâzıl's masterpiece and the best-known of his works. He also emphasizes that his motivation to translate the Zenanname above numerous other and occasionally more significant works of Ottoman poetry arose from the orientalist interest in women and harems in the Ottoman realm.

Joseph von Hammer-Purgstall, a prominent orientalist and historian of the Ottoman Empire, compared the work to Ovid's Ars Amatoria in his History of Ottoman Poetry.

Murat Bardakçı writes that the book, when first printed in book form in 1837, was banned in the Ottoman Empire, purportedly due to its opposition to the institution of marriage.

=== Feminist interpretation ===
Feminist scholars interpreted The Zenanname as a commentary on the representation of women in Ottoman art and literature. These readings understand the texts and its illustrations and the simultaneous idealized and critiques female figures, exposing the tension between aesthetic admiration and the social constraints placed on women in the early modern Ottoman empire.

== Manuscripts ==
Extant illuminated manuscripts of the Zenanname, featuring miniatures of women, are housed in the Köprülü Library (34 Ma 422/4), Istanbul Millet Library (34 Ae Manzum 1061/3 and 1062/2), British Library (Or 7094; formerly in the collection of E. J. W. Gibb), and Princeton University Library (Islamic Manuscripts, Third Series no. 277).

== See also ==
- Women in the Ottoman Empire
- Gender and sexual minorities in the Ottoman Empire
- Ottoman poetry

== Bibliography ==
- Bardakçı, Murat (1992). Osmanlı'da Seks [Sex in the Ottoman Empire]. İnkılap Yayınları.
- Gibb, E. J. W. (1905). A History of Ottoman Poetry. Vol. 4. London: Luzac & Co.
- Havlioğlu, Didem (2017). "Troubling Love: Performativity in Ottoman Poetry". Mihrî Hatun: Performance, Gender-Bending, and Subversion in Ottoman Intellectual History. Gender, Culture, and Politics in the Middle East. Syracuse University Press. pp. 101–114. doi:10.2307/j.ctt1pk863x.13.
- Öztürk, Nebiye (2002). Zenannâme: Enderûnlu Fâzıl. Istanbul University, Faculty of Social Science, Turkish Language and Literature graduate thesis.
- Schick, İrvin Cemil (2004). "Representation of Gender and Sexuality in Ottoman and Turkish Erotic Literature". The Turkish Studies Association Journal. 28 (1/2): 81–103. JSTOR 43383697.
