= Tophane Fountain =

18th century Turkish fountain

- Tophane Çeşmesi
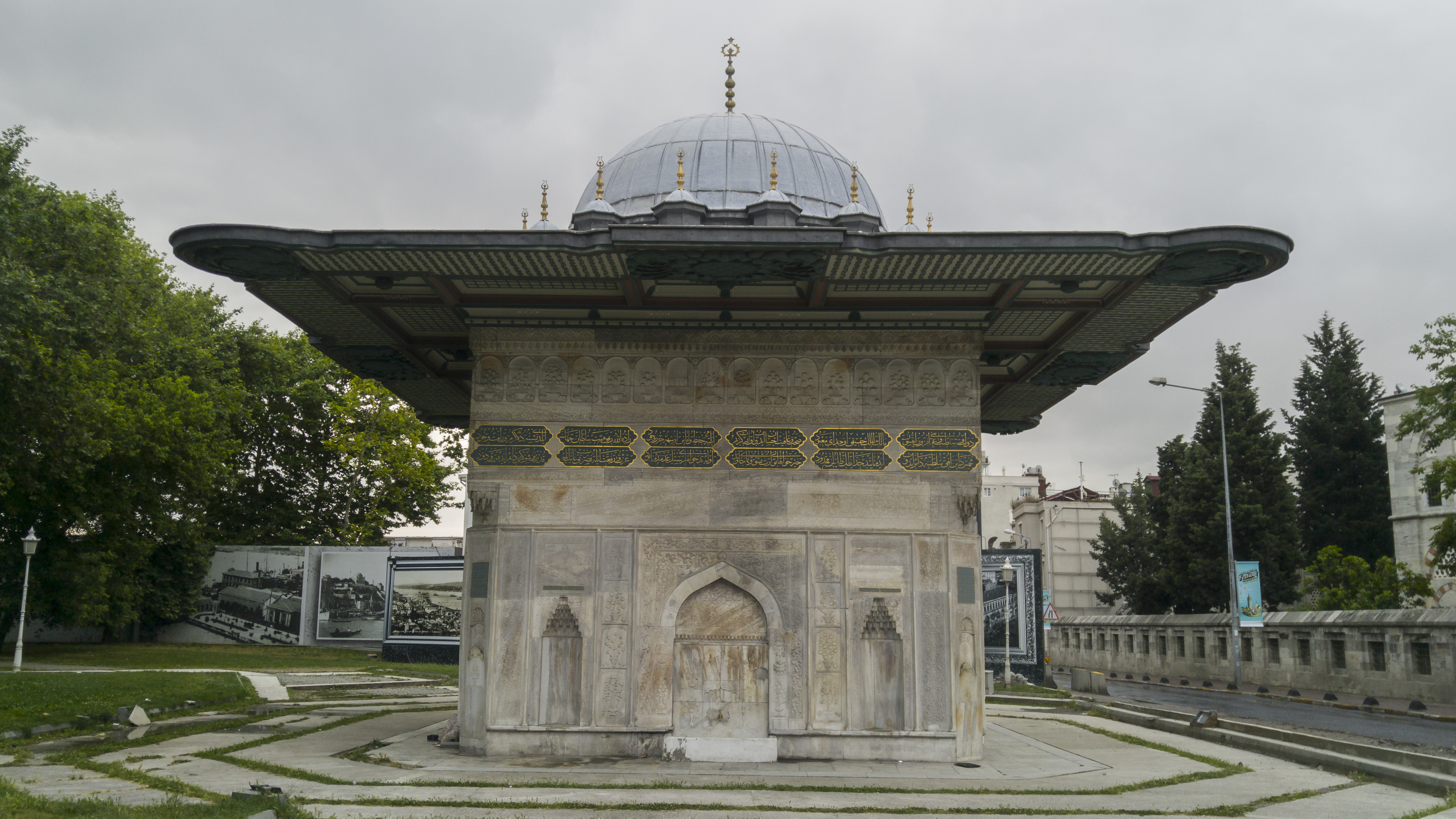
- Tophane Fountain in Tophane, Beyoğlu, Istanbul.

- Location within Istanbul

General information
- Type: Fountain
- Architectural style: Ottoman architecture
- Location: Tophane, Beyoğlu, Istanbul, Turkey
- Coordinates: 41°01′36″N 28°58′52″E
- Completed: 1732; 294 years ago

Height
- Roof: Wooden covered with lead sheet

Technical details
- Material: Marble

Design and construction
- Architect: Kayserili Mehmed Ağa

Tophane Fountain (Turkish: Tophane Çeşmesi) is an 18th-century public water fountain built by Ottoman sultan Mahmud I in the Ottoman rococo architecture and situated in the square of Tophane neighborhood in Beyoğlu district of Istanbul, Turkey.

== History ==
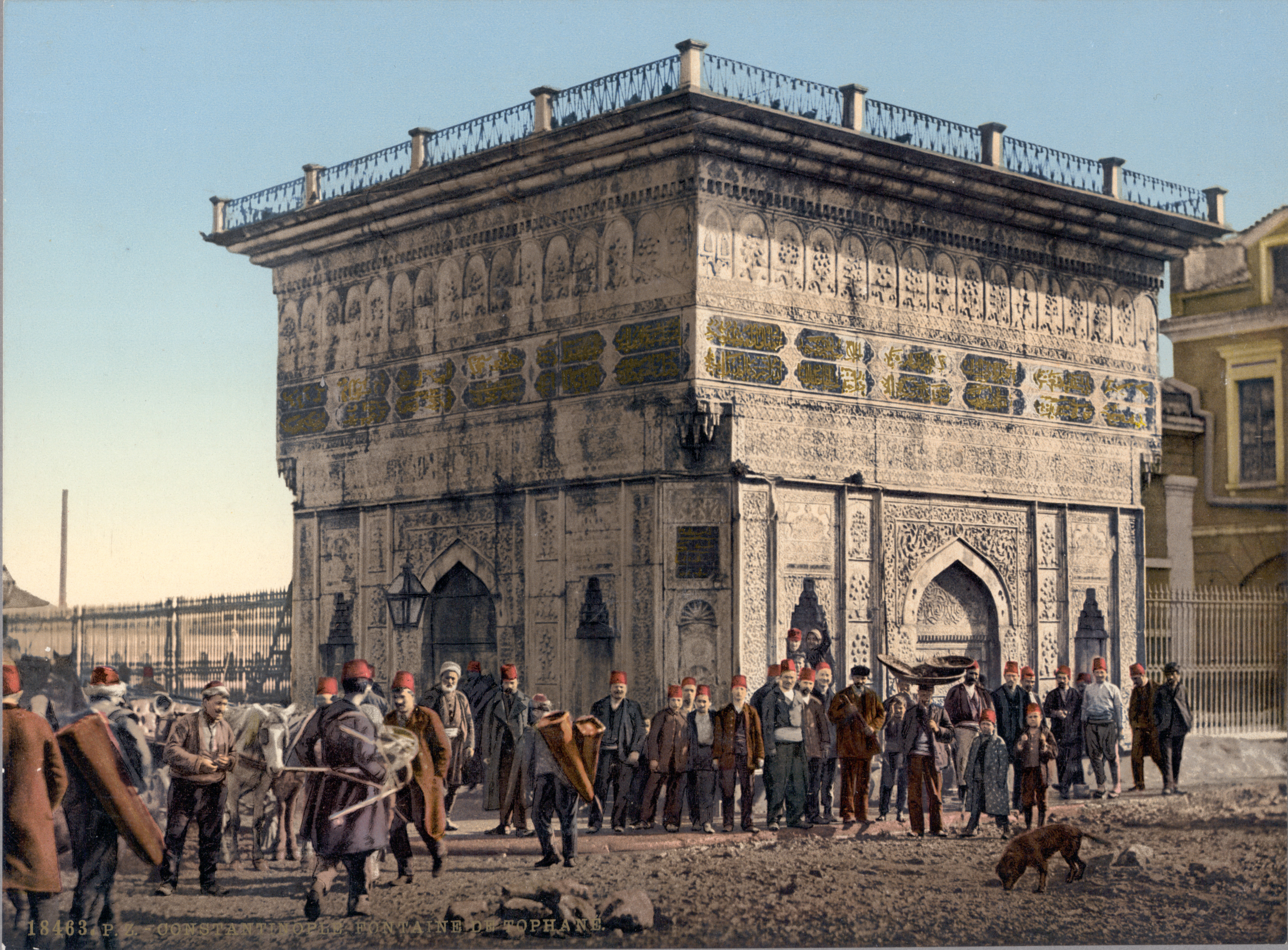
Tophane Fountain between 1890 and 1900.

The sebil, a public fountain to provide drinking water for travellers and running water for praying people's ritual washing needs, was commissioned by Sultan Mahmud I (reigned 1730–1754). It was built in 1732, in an era with great importance attached to the construction of many fountains.

It is situated in the square, which is formed by the intersection of Tophane İskelesi Street and Necatibey Street. The fountain neighbors Kılıç Ali Paşa Complex in the southwest, Nusretiye Mosque in the northeast, the Tophane Workshops in the northwest and the Quay in the southeast.

The fountain underwent two major restorations. The first one was realized in 1837, when its roof was completely changed, and a flat roof in the form of a terrace adapted. In the 1956–1957, it was restored in the framework of urban transformation, and the roof and wide eaves were rearranged sticking by the original form seen at engravings.

In 2006, one of Turkey's largest conglomerates contributed to the renovation and refining works at the fountain. On this occasion, the fountain was supplied with water again.

== Architecture ==
The fountain was built as a stand-alone structure in the type of a "square fountain" (Turkish: meydan çeşmesi). It looks like a monument, but contributes an architectural integration to the Kılıç Ali Pasha Complex (1580), which is situated nearby. It has the form of a square prism in general. However, the lower half of the structure has an octagonal plan, which transforms into a square at the upper half with the help of muqarnas.

It was designed by the court architect Kayserili Mehmed Ağa in the rococo architectural style of Ottoman Tulip Period (1703–1757). It is adorned with ornamentation showing a transition from classical to rococo style. Its design shows similarities with the Fountain of Ahmed III at Topkapı Palace (1729) and the Fountain of Ahmed III in Üsküdar (1729).

All four facades have the same design, a faucet inside a lancet arch in the middle over a watering trough to enable for bucket filling, livestock drinking or taking ritual body washing for prayer. The lancets are flanked by semicircular niches resembling a mosque's mihrab. The higher-attached faucets over a sink in the four corners were designed to spend drinking water for people. A number of relief fruit tree motifs in pots adorn the structure. The lead-sheet covered wooden roof has wide eaves, and is topped by a dome in the center.

The fountain features an inscription surrounding the entire structure and including a poem of Nahifi written in Islamic calligraphy.

== Gallery ==
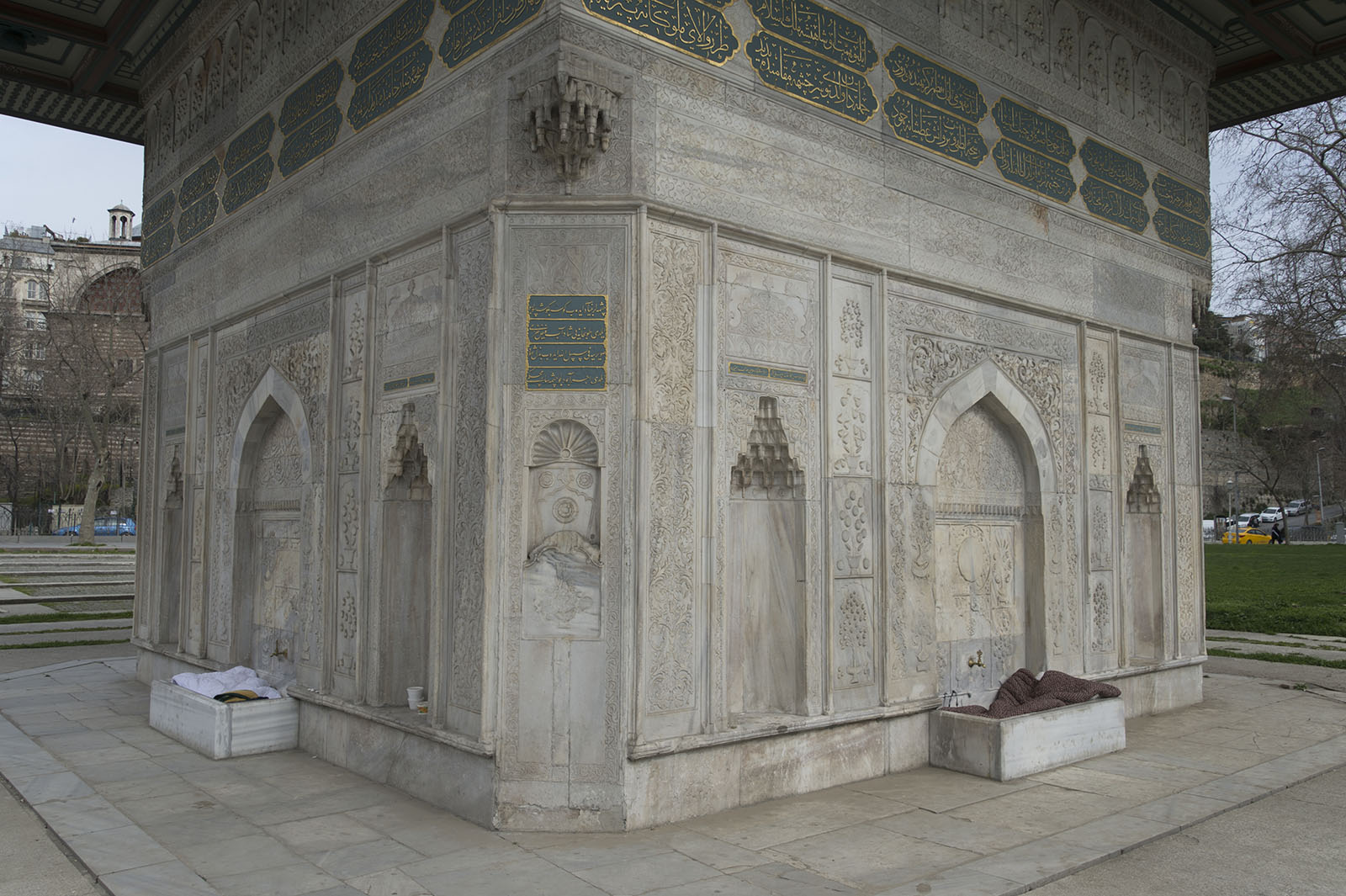
Tophane Fountain From northwest

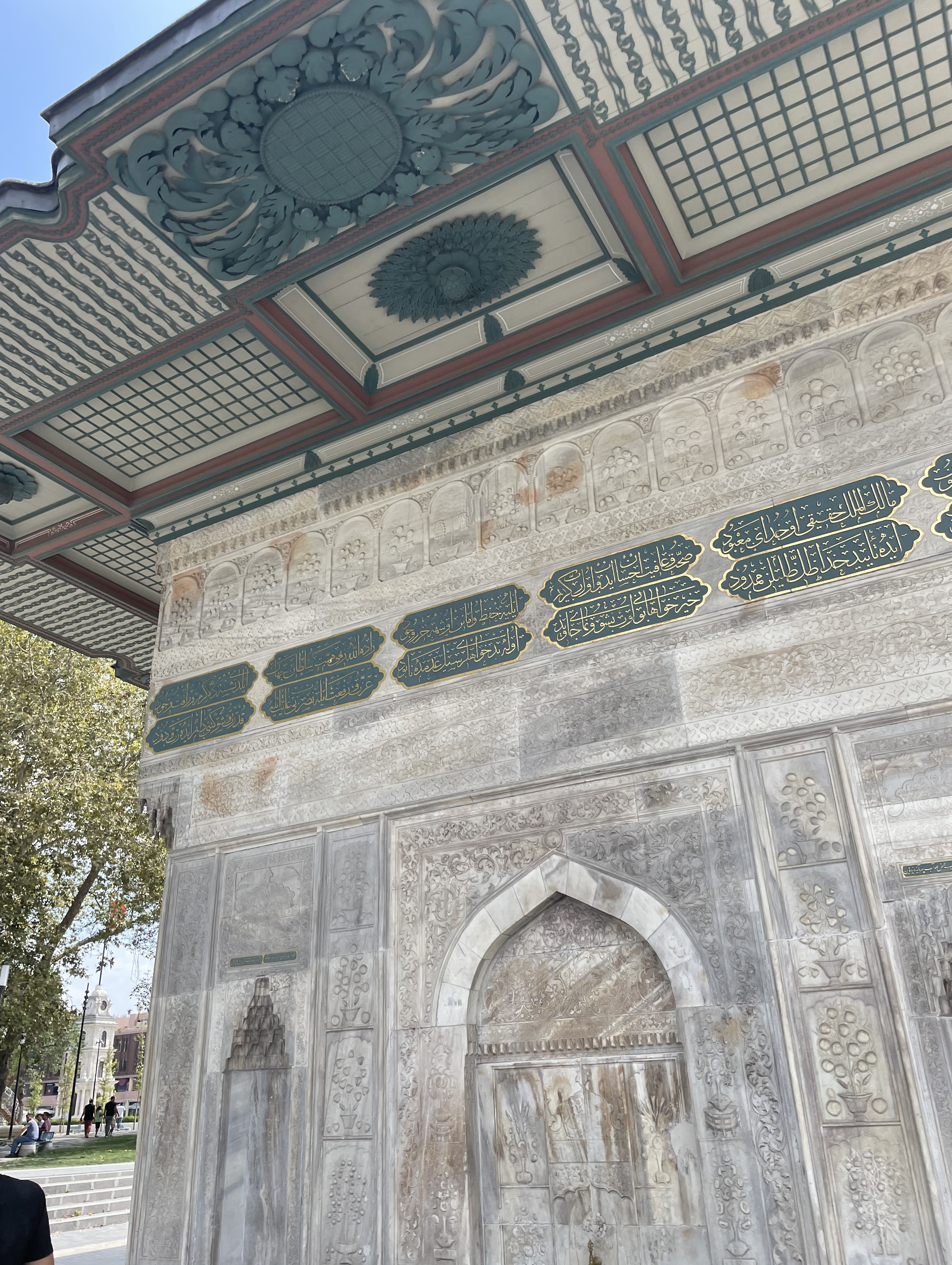
Tophane Fountain Details

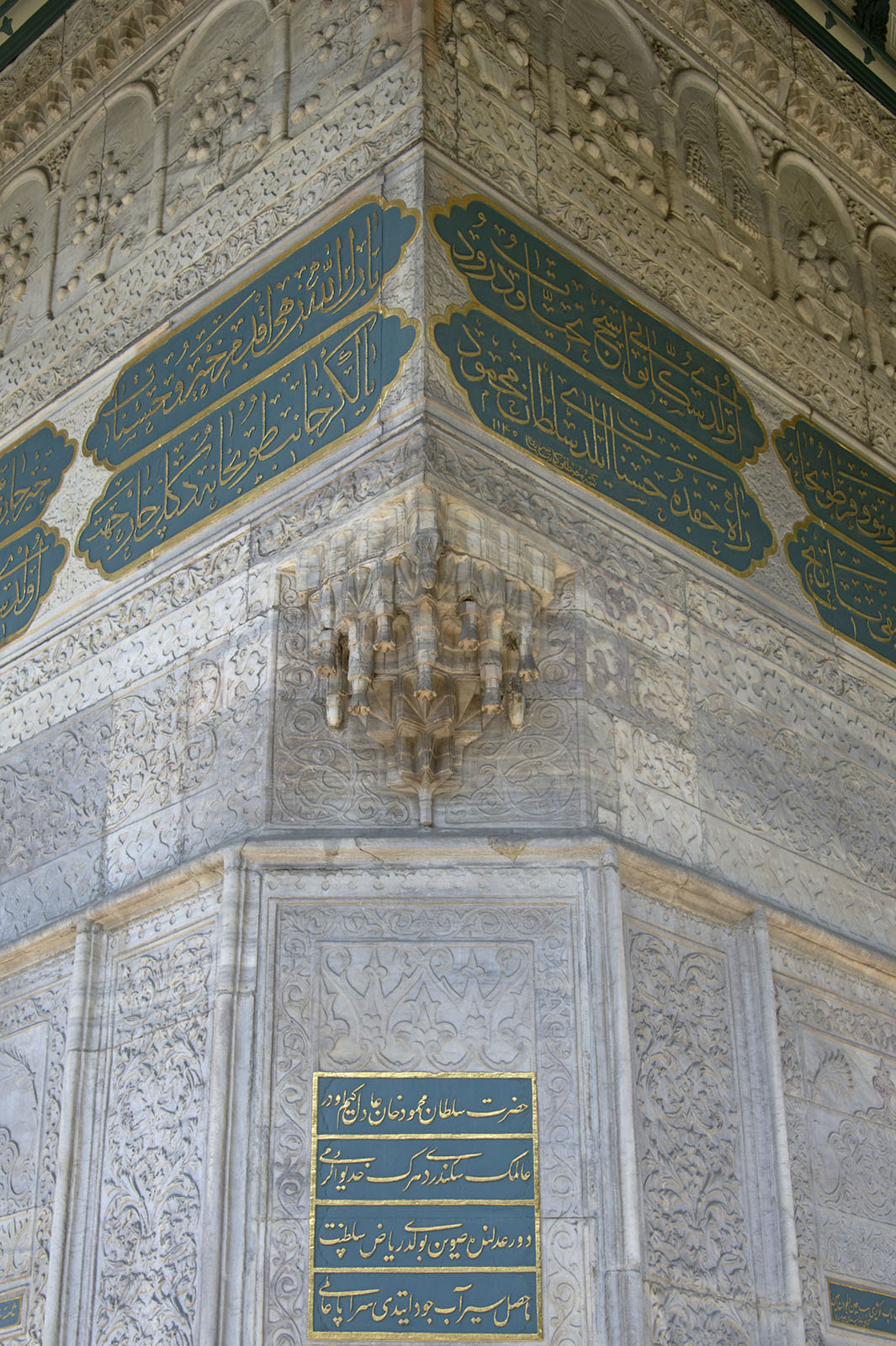
Tophane Fountain Corner

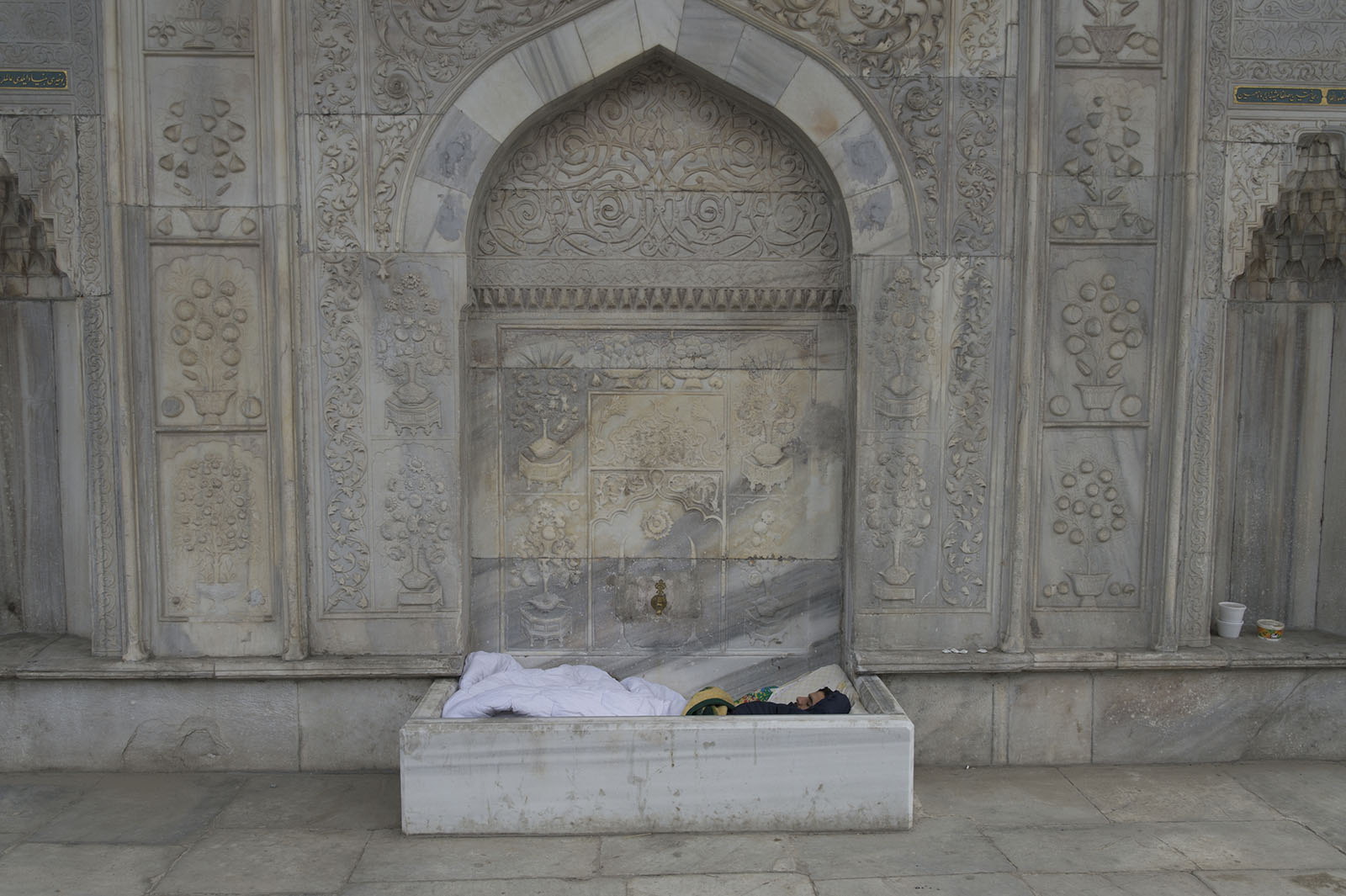
Tophane Fountain Watering trough

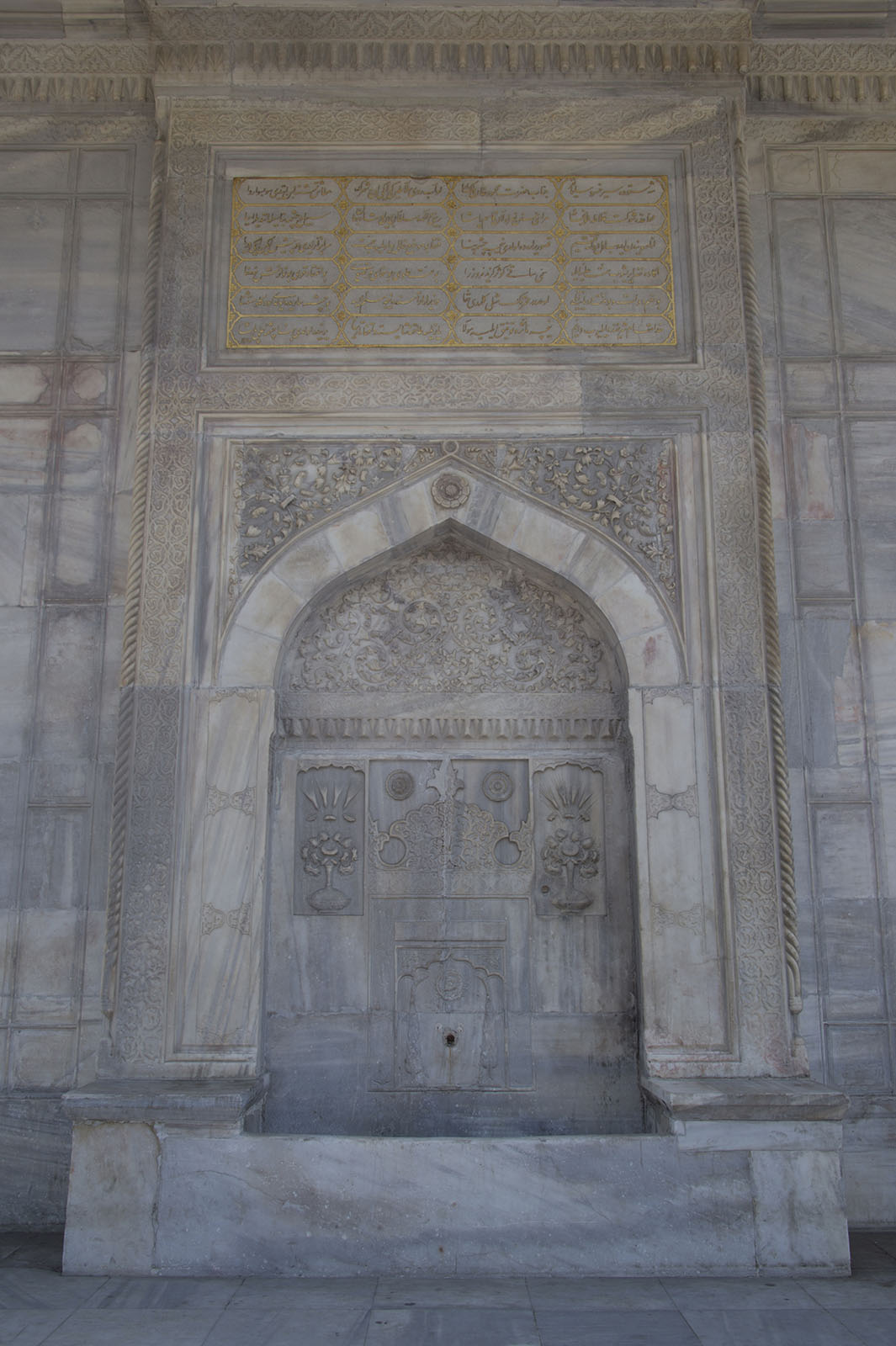
Tophane Fountain Watering trough

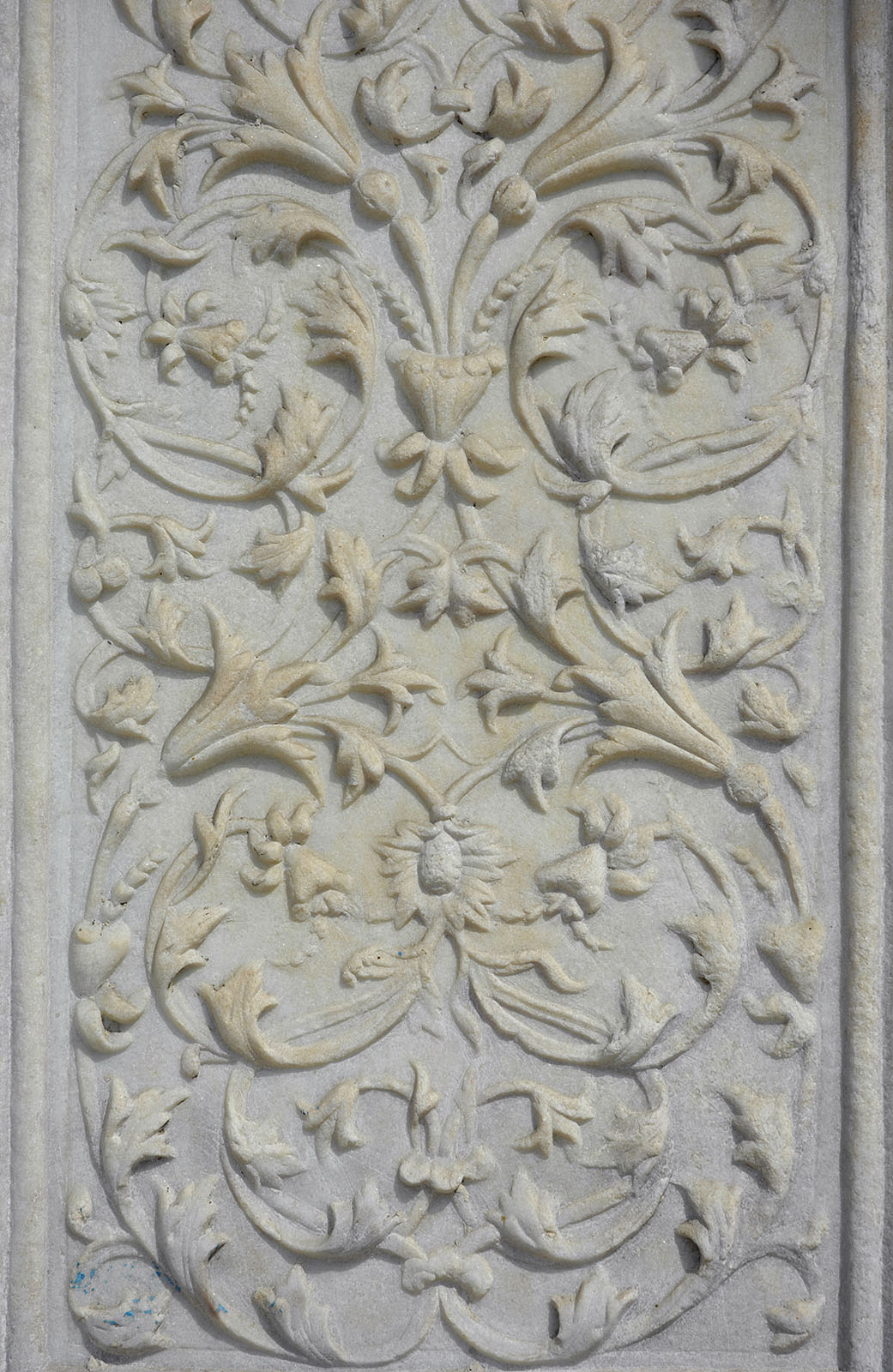
Tophane Fountain Floral and arabesque decoration

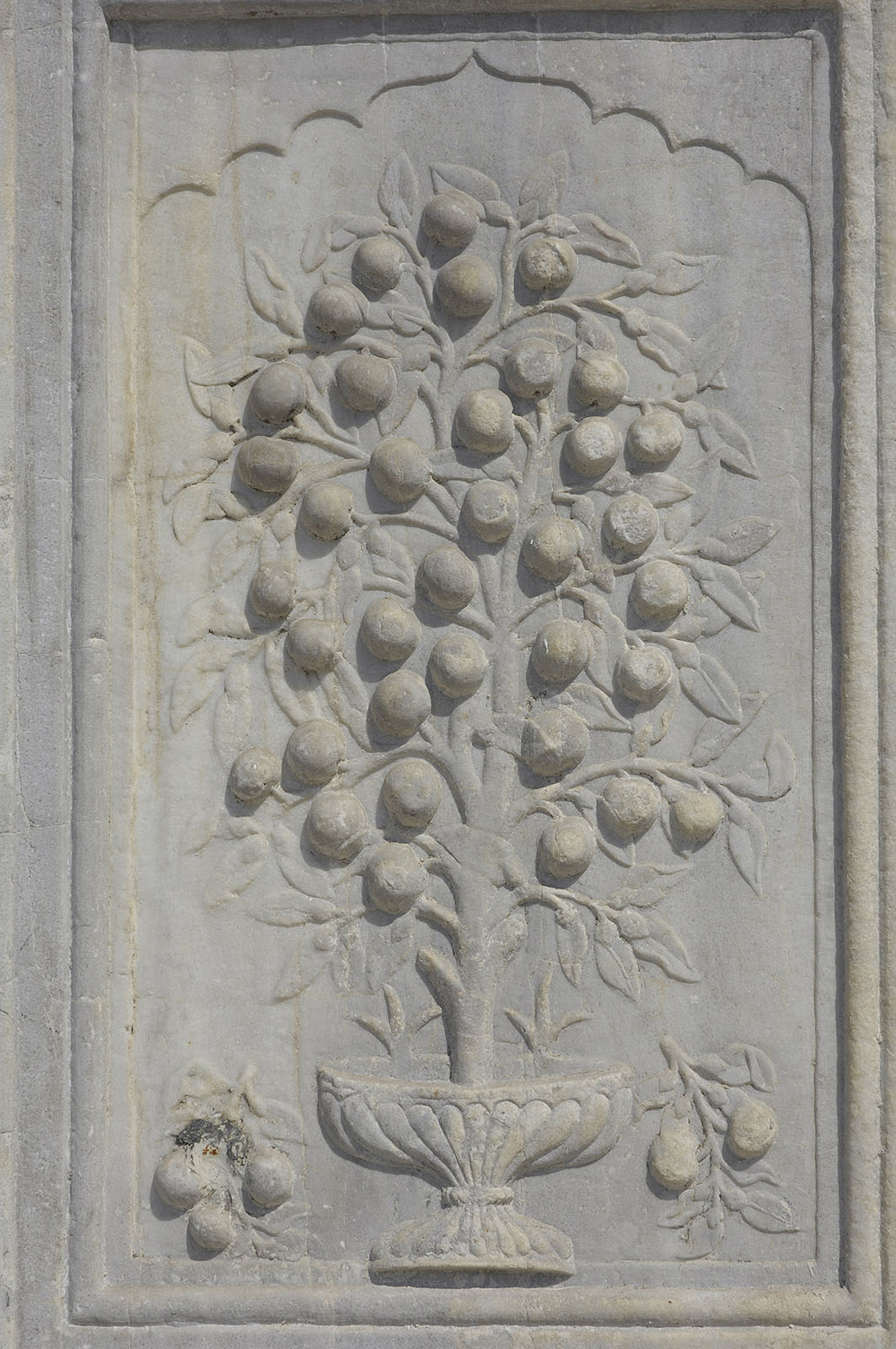
Tophane Fountain Tree decoration

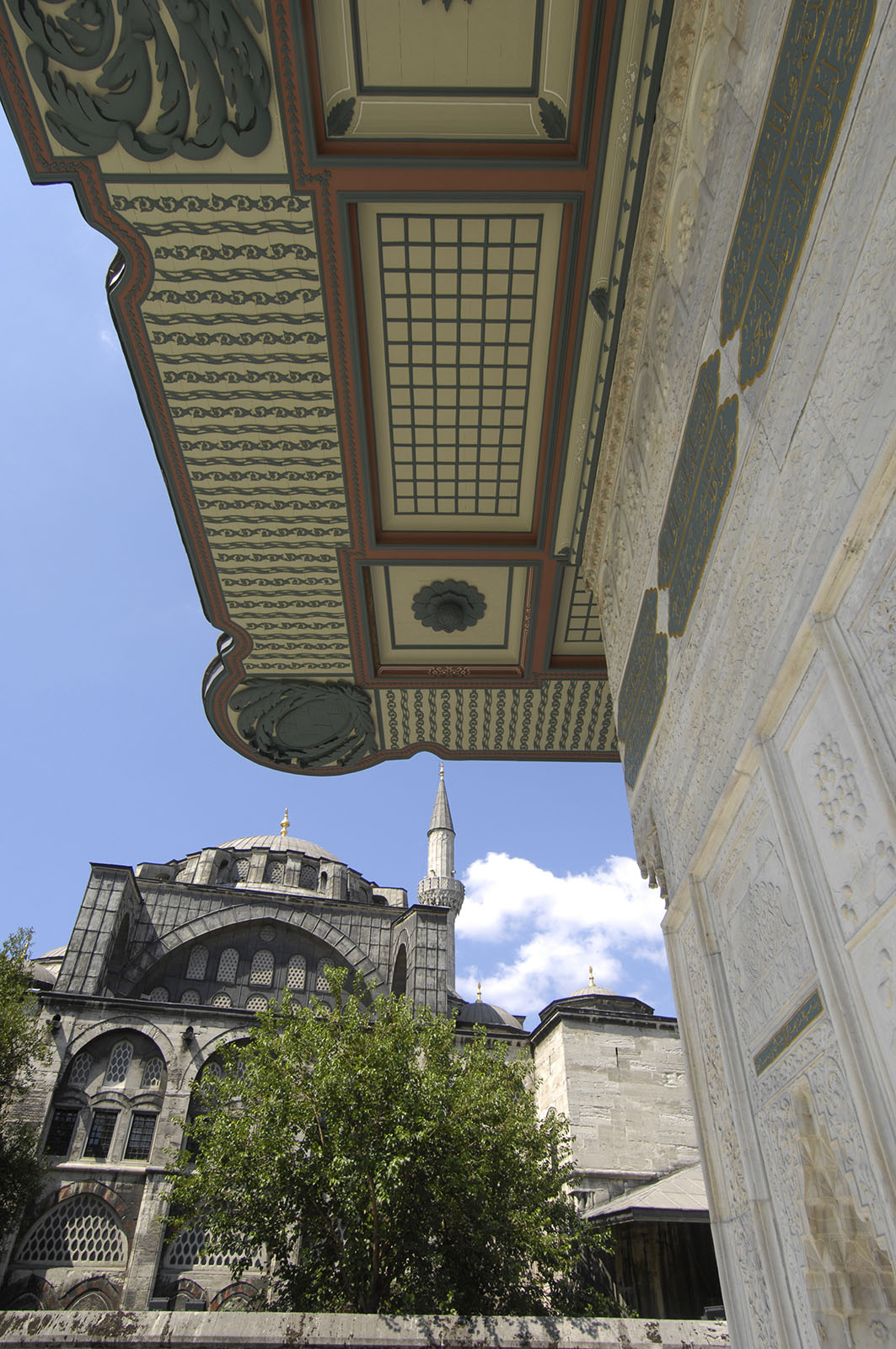
Tophane Fountain Side and Kiliç Ali Paşa

== See also ==
- List of fountains in Istanbul
