= List of fountains in Istanbul =

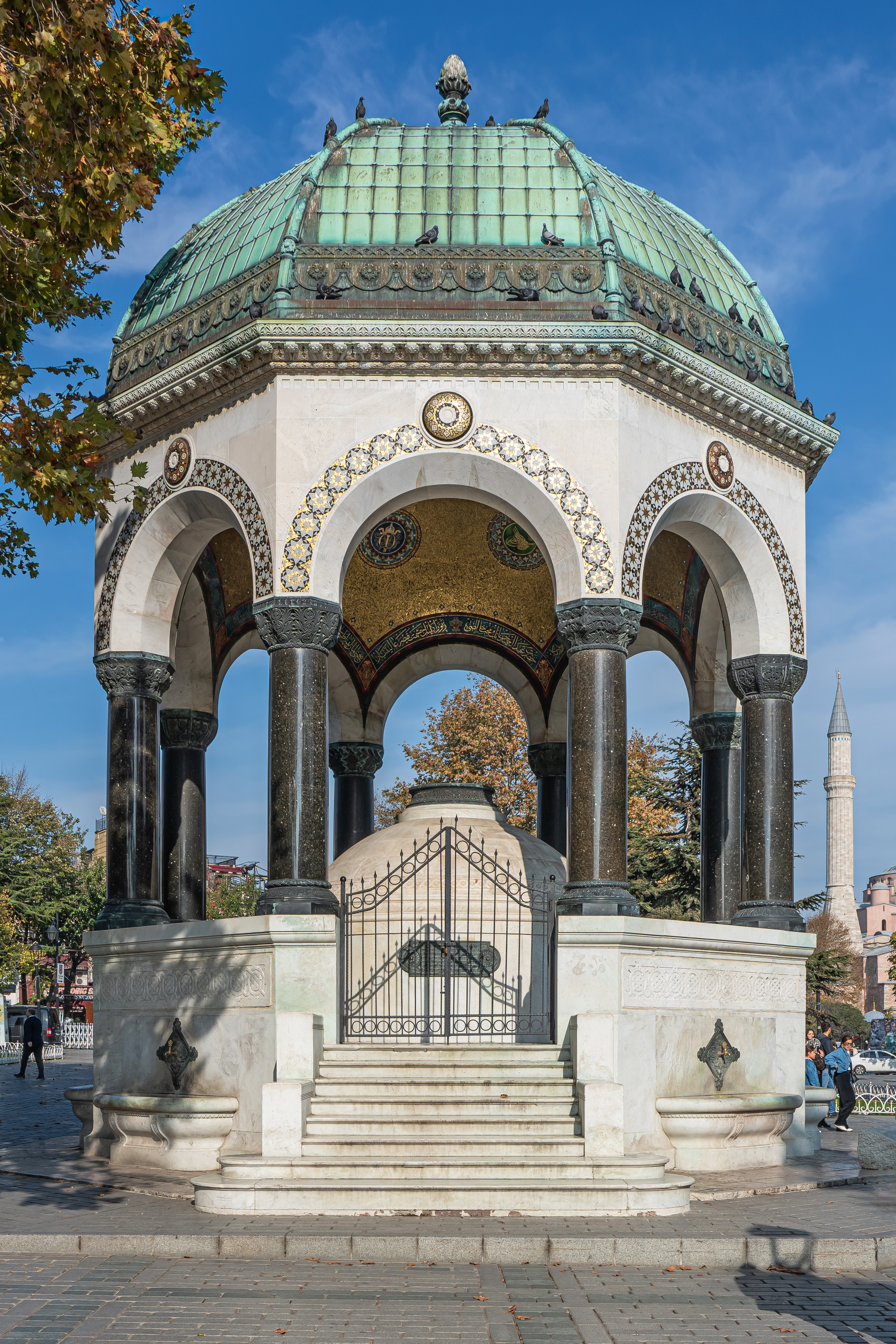
German Fountain

Following is a list of notable fountain in Istanbul, Turkey:

- Balat Fountain
- Çorbacı Fountain
- Fountain of Ahmed III
- Fountain of Ahmed III (Üsküdar)
- German Fountain
- Sultan Mahmut Fountain
- Tophane Fountain
- Yoğurtçu Fountain
