= German Fountain =

Gazebo styled fountain in Istanbul, Turkey

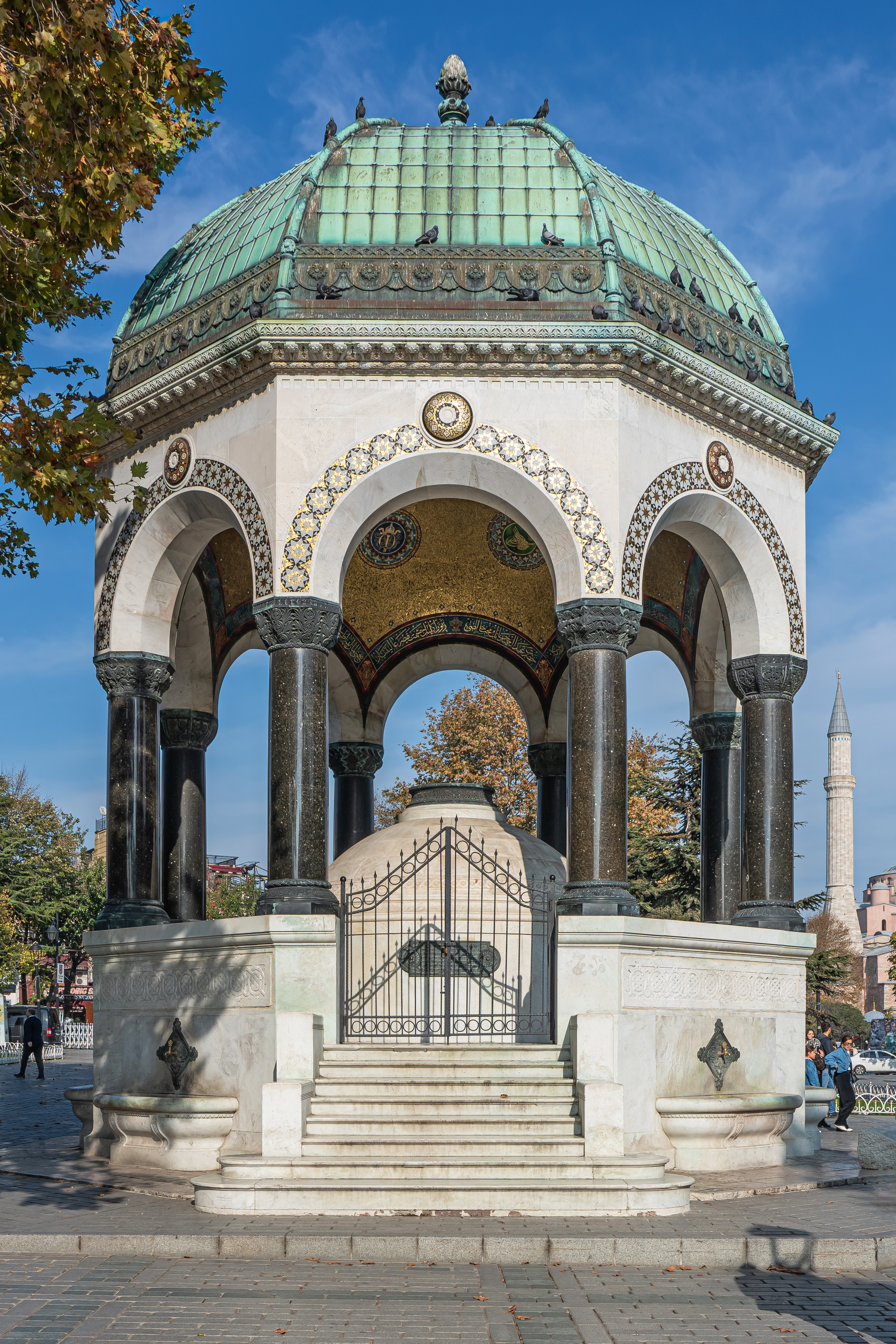
- German Fountain in Istanbul, Turkey
- Interactive map of German Fountain
- Location: Fatih, Istanbul, Turkey
- Coordinates: 41°00′26″N 28°58′36″E

The German Fountain (Turkish: Alman Çeşmesi; German: Deutscher Brunnen) is a gazebo styled fountain in the northern end of the former Hippodrome of Constantinople (Sultanahmet Square) in Istanbul and across from the Mausoleum of Sultan Ahmed I. It was constructed to commemorate the second anniversary of German Emperor Wilhelm II's visit to Istanbul in 1898. It was built in Germany, then transported piece by piece and assembled on its current site in 1900. The neo-Byzantine style fountain's octagonal dome has eight marble columns, and dome's interior is covered with golden mosaics.

== History ==
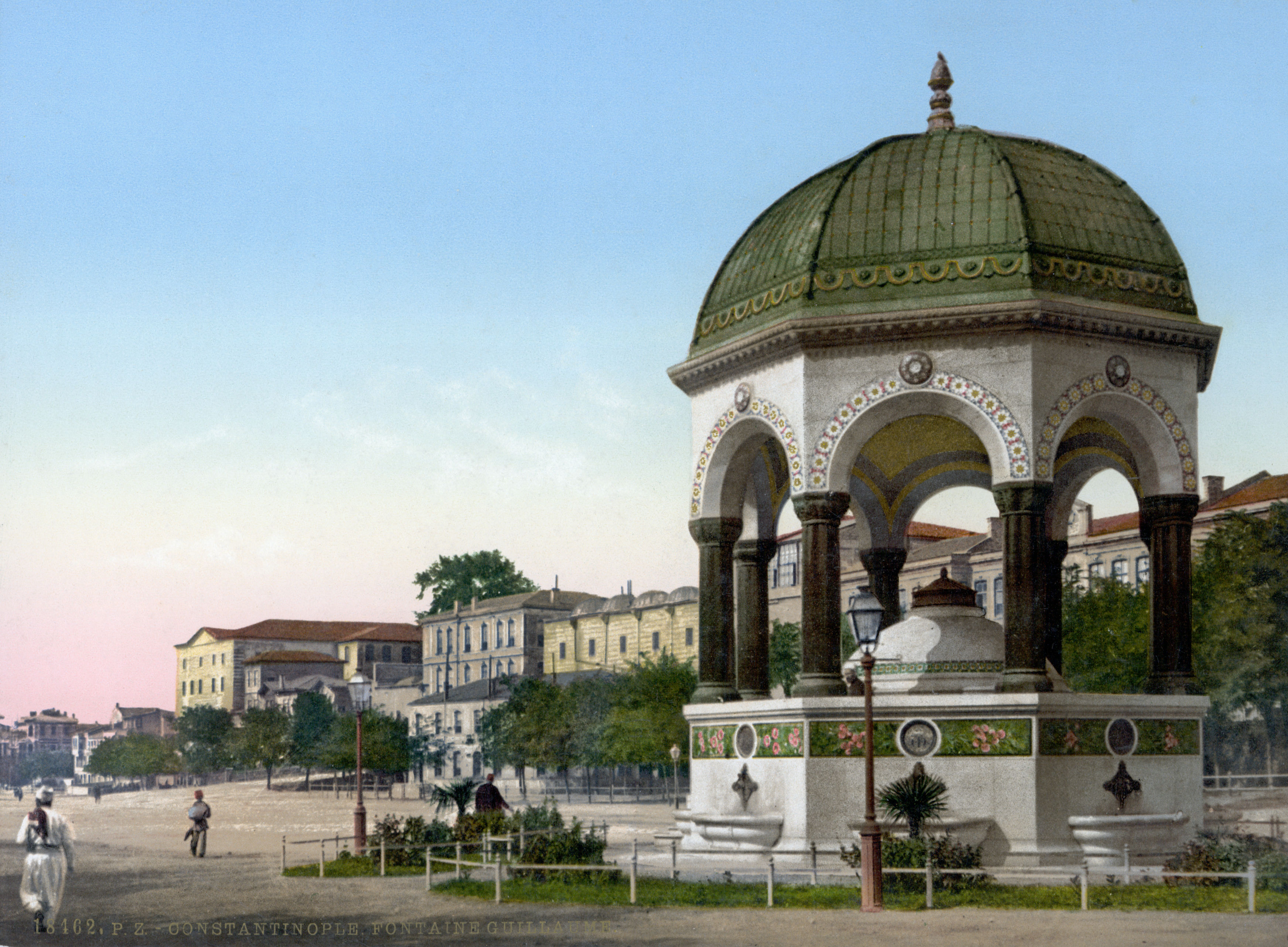
Historic photochrom print. The fountain is labelled Fontaine Guillaume, which literally translates to "Wilhelm Fountain".

The idea of Great Palace of Constantinople's Empire Lodge (Kathisma) being on the site of the German Fountain's, conflicts with the view that Carceres Gates of Hippodrome were found on the site of the fountain however, the hypothesis of Carceres Gates being on the site enforces the view that Quadriga of Lysippos was used to stand on the site of the German Fountain.

During his reign as German Emperor and King of Prussia, Wilhelm II visited several European and Eastern countries. His second state visit to the Ottoman Empire (after the first in 1889, before his last in 1917) started in its capital Istanbul on 18 October 1898 during the reign of Abdülhamid II. The Emperor's primary motivation for visiting was to gain approval for the construction of the Berlin–Baghdad railway, which would run from Berlin to the Persian Gulf, and would further connect to British India through Persia. The railway could provide a short and quick route from Europe to Asia, and could carry German exports, troops and artillery. At the time, the Ottoman Empire could not afford such a railway, and Abdülhamid II was grateful for Wilhelm's offer, but was suspicious over the German motives. Abdülhamid II's secret service believed that German archaeologists in the Emperor's retinue were in fact geologists with designs on the oil wealth of the Ottoman empire. Later, the secret service uncovered a German report, which noted that the oilfields in Mosul, northern Mesopotamia were richer than those in the Caucusus. On his first visit, Wilhelm secured the sale of German-made rifles to the Ottoman Army, and on his second visit he secured a promise for German companies to construct the Istanbul-Baghdad railway. The German Government constructed the German Fountain for Wilhelm II and Empress Augusta's 1898 Istanbul visit. According to Afife Batur, the fountain's plans were drawn by architect Max Spitta and constructed by architect Schoele, also German architect Carlitzik and Italian architect Joseph Anthony worked on this project.

According to the Ottoman inscription, the fountain's construction started in the Hejira 1319 (1898–1899), although the inauguration of the fountain was planned to take place on 1 September 1900 – the 25th anniversary of Abdülhamid II's ascension to the throne. Construction, however, could not finish at the planned time and it was instead inaugurated on 27 January 1901, which was Wilhelm II's birthdate. Marble, stone and gem parts of the fountain were constructed in Germany and transported piece by piece to Istanbul by ships. The inauguration was photographed by Ali Sami Bey, the chief photographer of the Ottoman Ministry of Navy, who produced a twelve-photograph commemorative album documenting the ceremony.

From Istanbul the Emperor and his entourage travelled on to the Ottoman provinces of the Holy Land, Lebanon and Syria, fulfilling a vow of his late father and his late uncle (Frederick William IV of Prussia) by inaugurating the Church of the Redeemer, Jerusalem on 31 October, among others meetings and visits.

== Architecture ==
The German Fountain was constructed on the site where there was a tree which is known as Vakvak Tree (Turkish: Vakvak Ağacı) or The Bloody Plane (Turkish: Kanlı Çınar). In the 1656 janissary rebellion, Mehmed IV yielded a number of officials to the demands of the rebels and these victims, when killed, were suspended on the Plane in the Hippodrome. Boynuyaralı Mehmed Pasha overcame this rebellion, which took two months and named Vak'a-i Vakvakiye, after becoming Grand Vizier. The plane named after Seçere-i Vakvak (Vakvak Tree) which believed to be in Jahannam and its fruits are human heads.

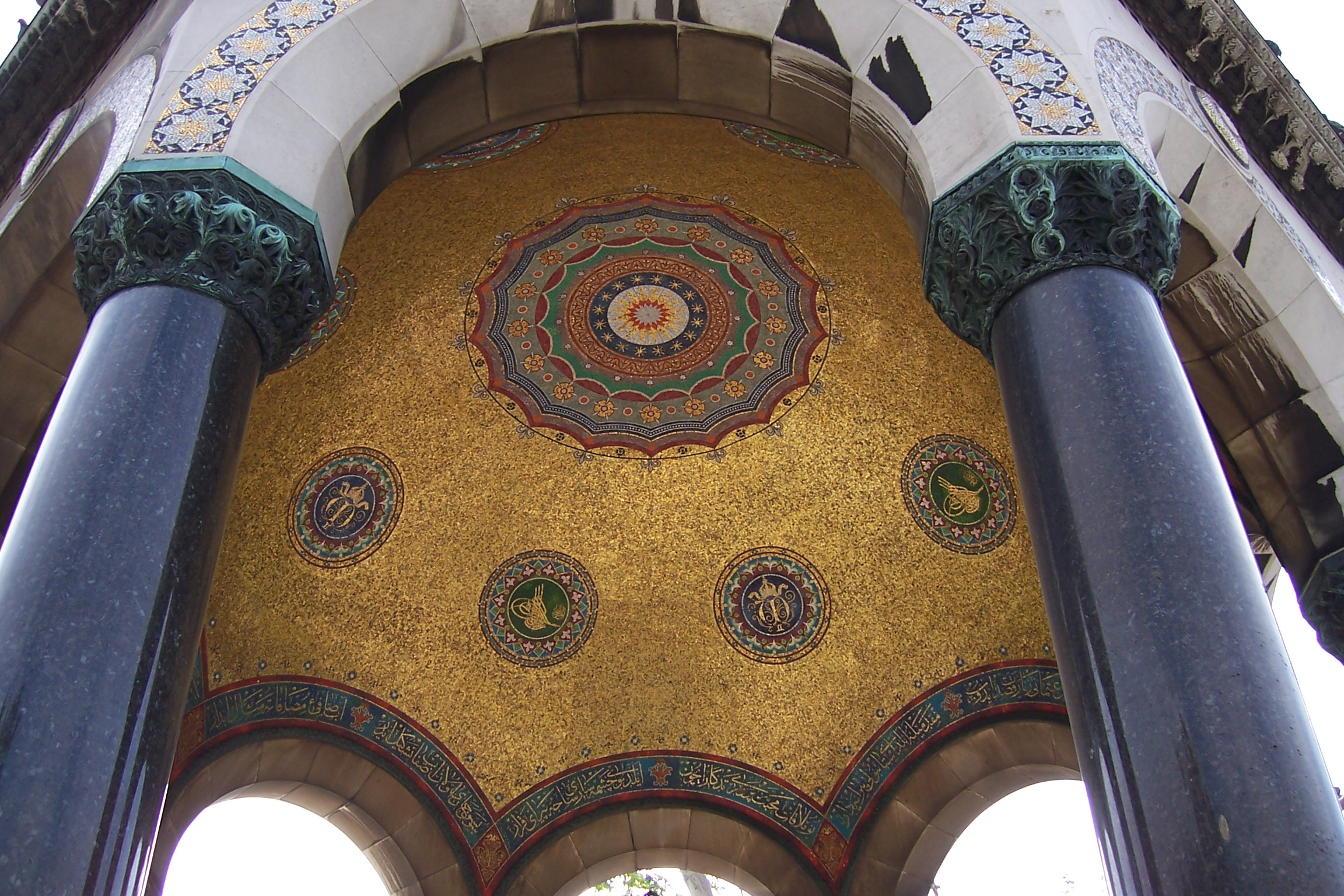
Dome's interior part

The neo-Byzantine style octagonal fountain stands on a base with eight steps rising up to an entry gate. There are seven brass fountain spouts over basins on the remaining sides, and over the central reservoir there is a dome supported by eight porphyry columns. The fountain's central reservoir stands on a mosaic-tiled platform and surmounted with the bronze dome, which is raised on carved marble arches. There are eight monograms in the arch stonework and they represent the political union of Abdülhamid II and Wilhelm. In four of these medallions, Abdülhamid II's tughra is written on green background, and in other four Wilhelm's symbol "W" is written on a Prussian blue background. Also, over "W" there is a crown and below it a "II" is written. The fountain was surrounded with a bronze fence, but unfortunately this has been lost. The outside of the dome is ornately patterned bronze; the dome's ceiling is decorated with golden mosaics and again with Abdülhamid II's tughra and Wilhelm II's symbol.

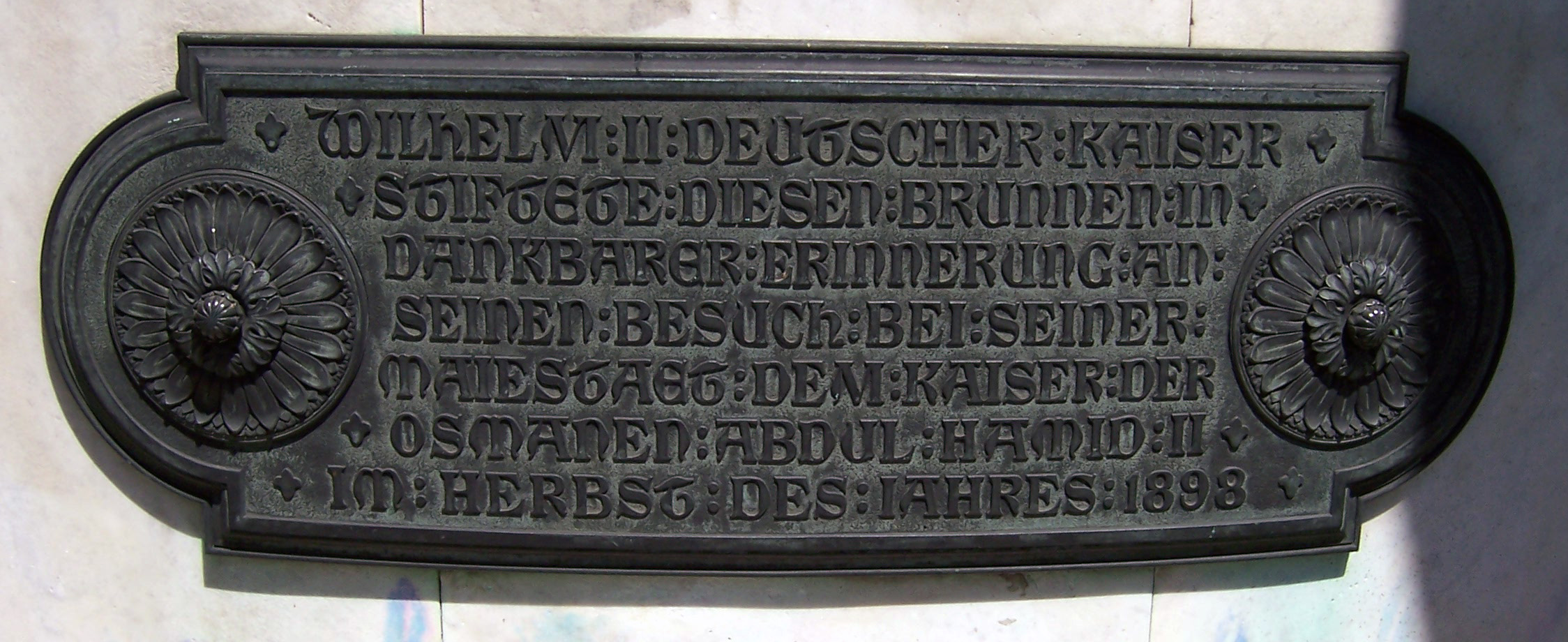
Wilhelm II's inscription

The bronze inscription on the reservoir, which was written in German, reads "Wilhelm II Deutscher Kaiser stiftete diesen Brunnen in dankbarer Erinnerung an seinen Besuch bei Seiner Maiestaet [sic] dem Kaiser der Osmanen Abdul Hamid II im Herbst des Jahres 1898" meaning "German Kaiser Wilhelm II endowed this fountain, in thankful remembrance of his visit to the Ottoman Sultan Abdülhamid II in autumn of the year 1898". There is also an Ottoman inscription in the arch of fountain, Undersecretary of Seraskery Ahmet Muhtar Bey's eight couplet history verse is written by Hattat İzzet Efendi. The poem commemorates the construction of the fountain for Wilhelm II's visit to Istanbul.

=== Incidents ===
The German fountain was the site of a terrorist bombing which killed 13 people (12 of them German) and injured many more on 12 January 2016.

== See also ==
- List of fountains in Istanbul
