= Jeli Thuluth =

Calligraphic variety of Arabic script

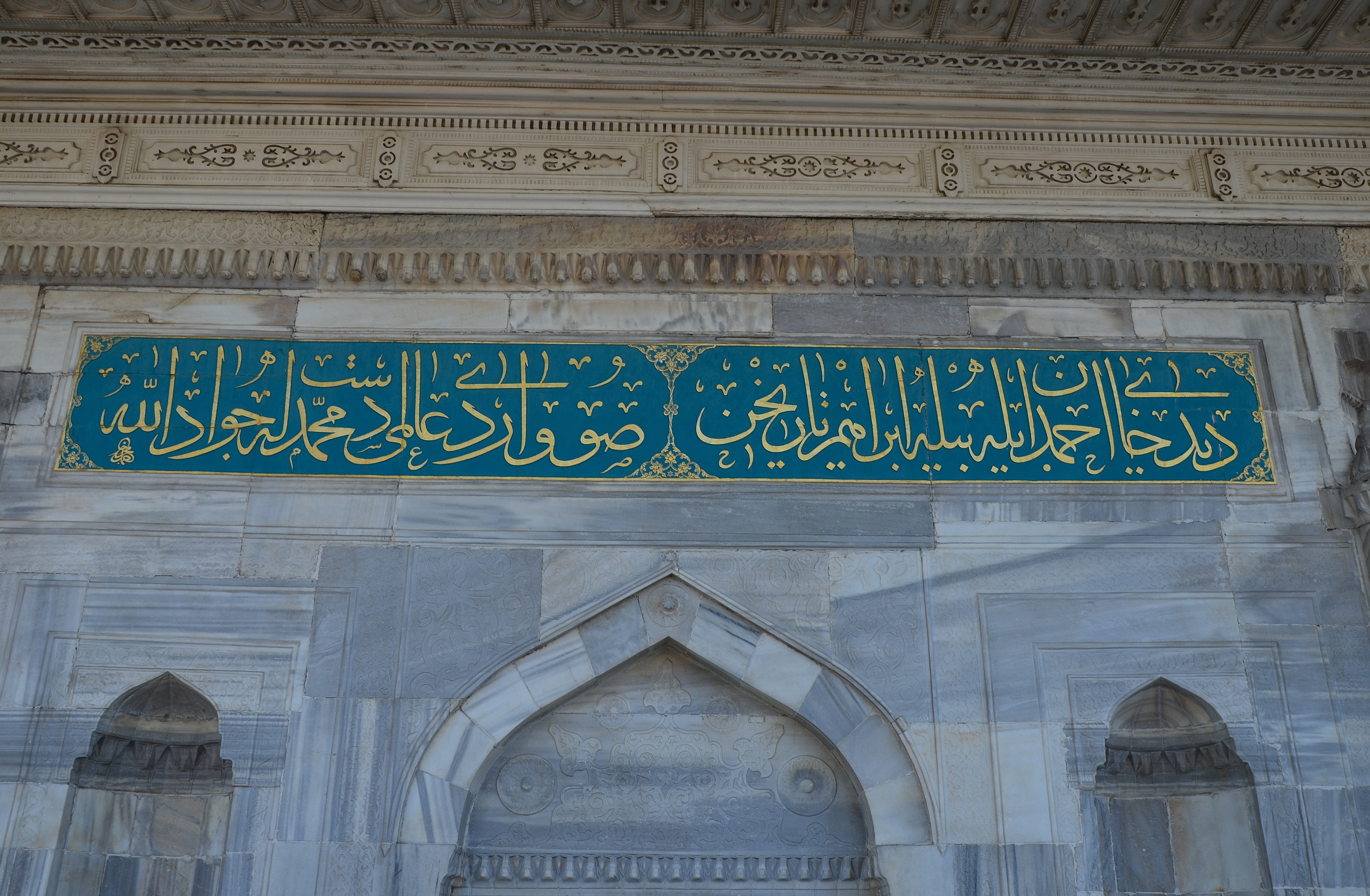
Calligraphic inscript in Jeli Thuluth style handwritten by Ottoman sultan Ahmed III on the main facade of Fountain of Ahmed III in Üsküdar (1729), Istanbul.

Jeli Thuluth (Persian: جلی ثلث) is a calligraphic variety of Arabic script. This term was applied to writings in Thuluth script when the point of the pen employed was at least one centimeter broad. Jeli Thuluth was used in large panels and for inscriptions carved in stone on buildings or tombstones.
