= Çorbacı Fountain =

Fountain in Istanbul, Turkey

- Çorbacı Çeşmesi
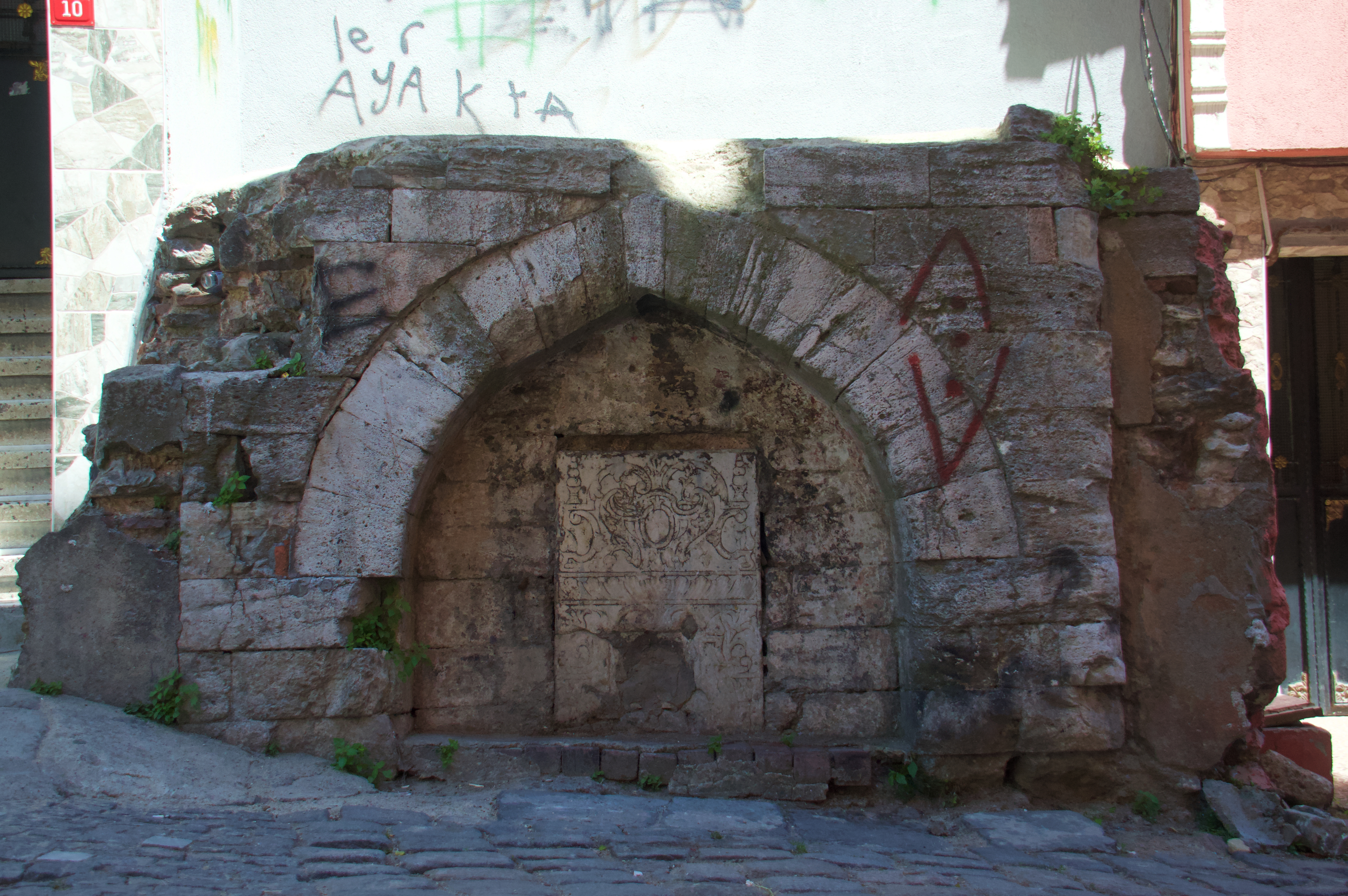
- The fountain in 2022
- Location: Istanbul
- 41°1′52.13″N 28°56′51.37″E

Çorbacı Fountain (Turkish: Çorbacı Çeşmesi) is a fountain in Balat, Fatih, Istanbul, Turkey.

== See also ==
- List of fountains in Istanbul
