= Sultan Mahmut Fountain =

- Sultan Mahmut Çeşmesi
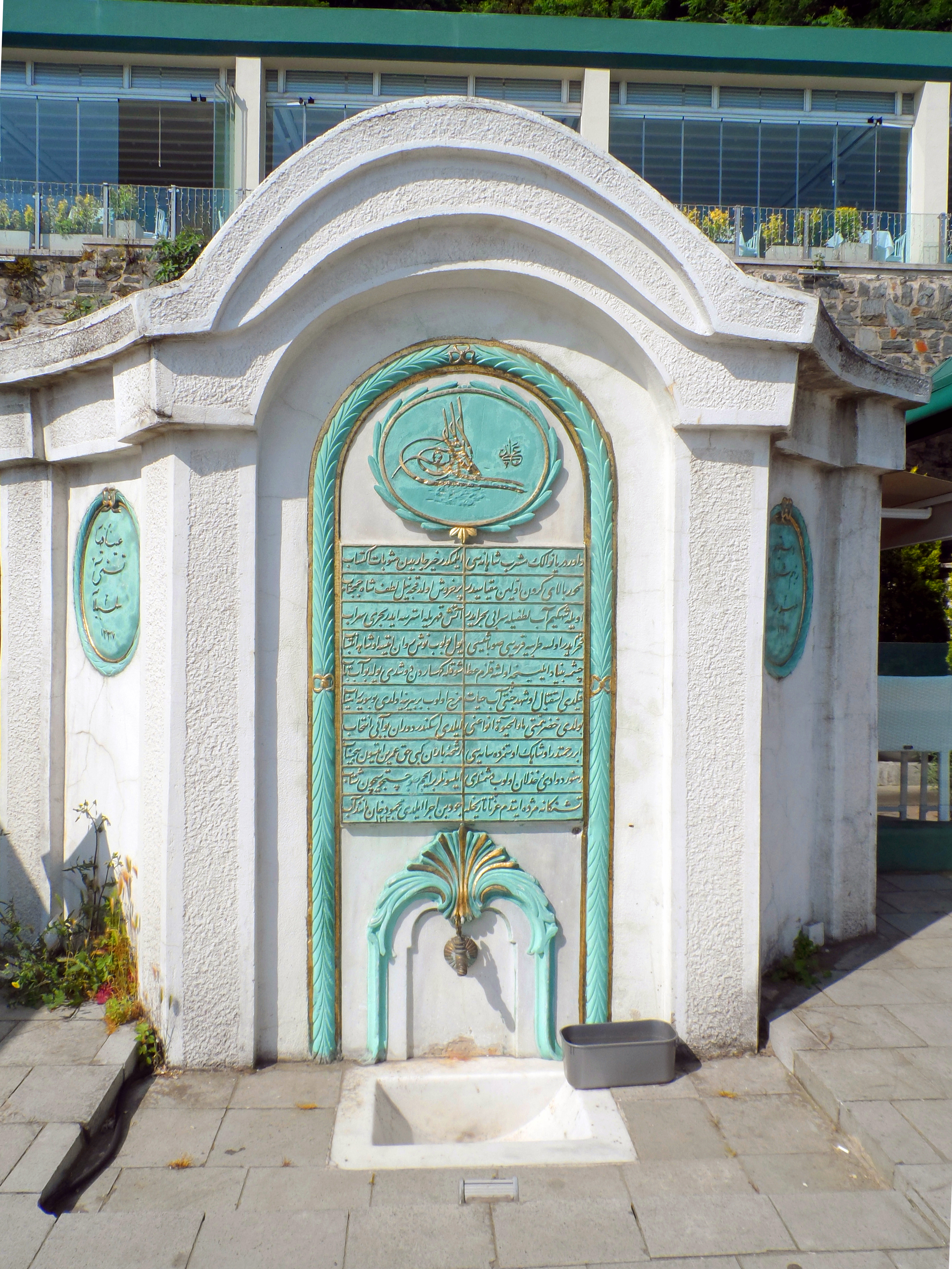
- Sultan Mahmut fountain in Kireçburnu, Sarıyer, Istanbul

- Location within Istanbul

General information
- Type: Fountain
- Architectural style: Ottoman architecture
- Location: Kireçburnu, Sarıyer, Istanbul, Turkey
- Coordinates: 41°08′47″N 29°03′10″E
- Completed: 1814; 212 years ago

Technical details
- Material: Marble

Sultan Mahmut Fountain (Turkish: Sultan Mahmut Çeşmesi) is a historical public fountain in Istanbul, Turkey.

The fountain is located in Kireçburnu neighborhood of Sarıyer secondary municipality by Bosphorous.

It was commissioned by Ottoman sultan Mahmut II (reigned 1808–1839) in 1814. Its ornamental slab as well as the inscription is made of marble. The inscription includes a tughra of the sultan. The inscription was written by Yesarizade Mustafa Izzet Efendi.

Presently, the fountain is out of use.

== See also ==
- List of fountains in Istanbul
