= Balat Fountain =

Fountain in Istanbul, Turkey

Coordinates: 41°2′3.6″N 28°56′49.1″E

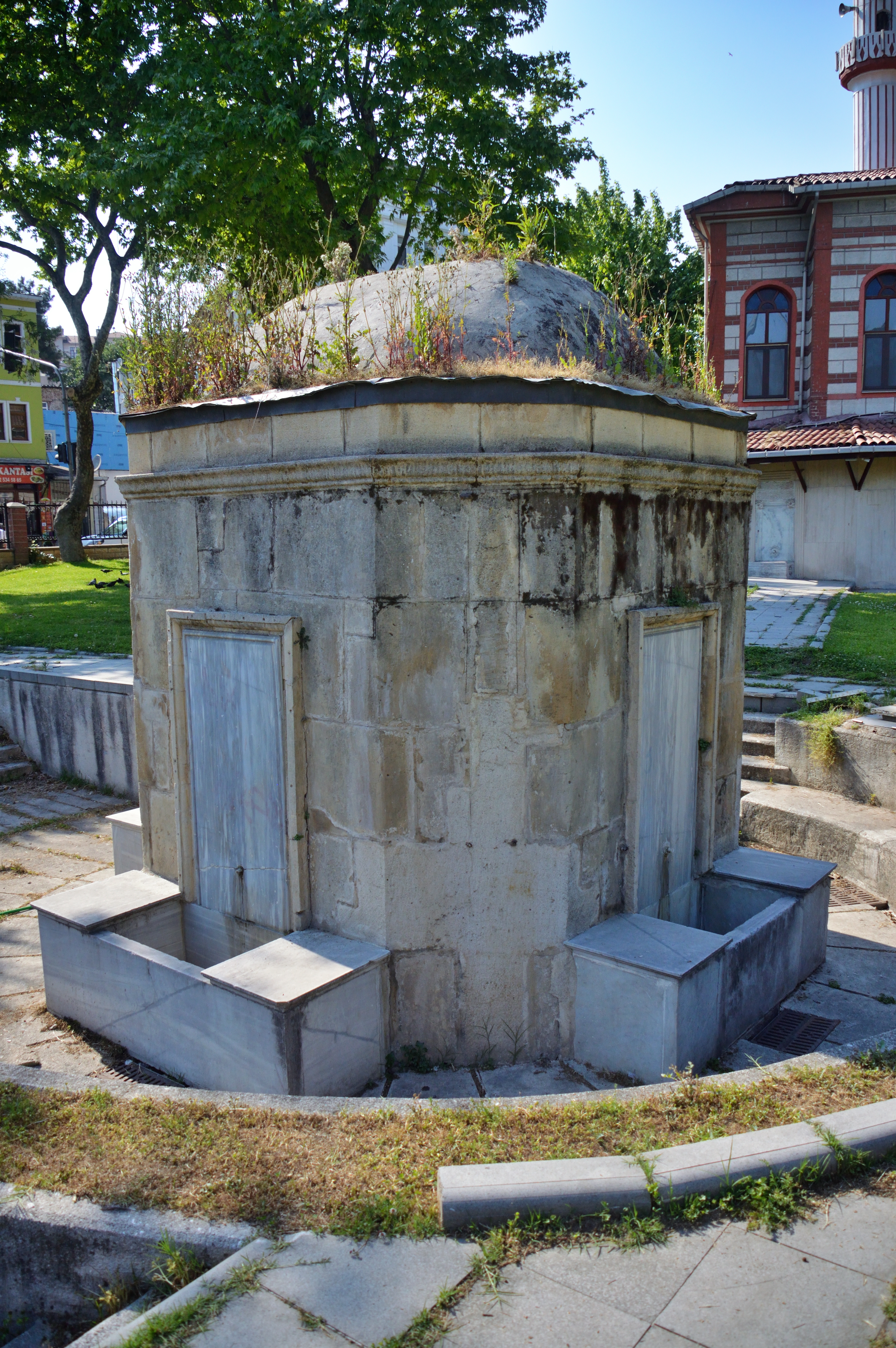
- Interactive map of the Balat Fountain area

General information
- Location: Ayvansaray, Fatih, Istanbul, Turkey

Yusuf Şucaeddin Mosque Fountain or Balat Fountain (Turkish: Balat Çeşmesi) is an Ottoman period fountain in the Ayvansaray neighborhood of Istanbul's Fatih district. After the Golden Horn coastal road works in the 1980s, it remained in the garden of Yusuf Şucaeddin Mosque. It is made of cut limestone and has a hexagonal shape. It has a large reservoir and a fountain on each of its four sides. It is covered with lead. There is a marble slab in place of the mirror stone. Only one fountain has water flowing.

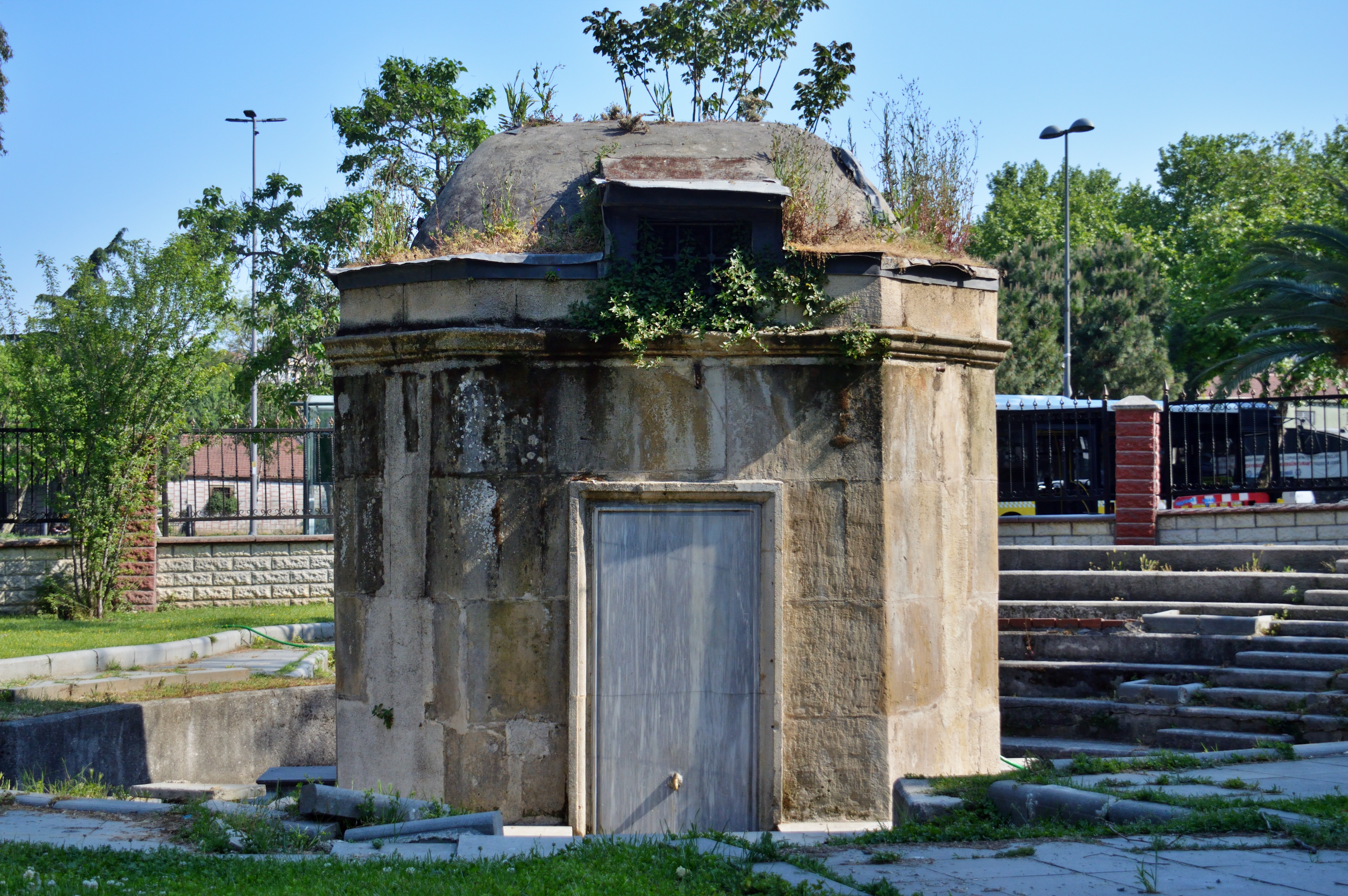

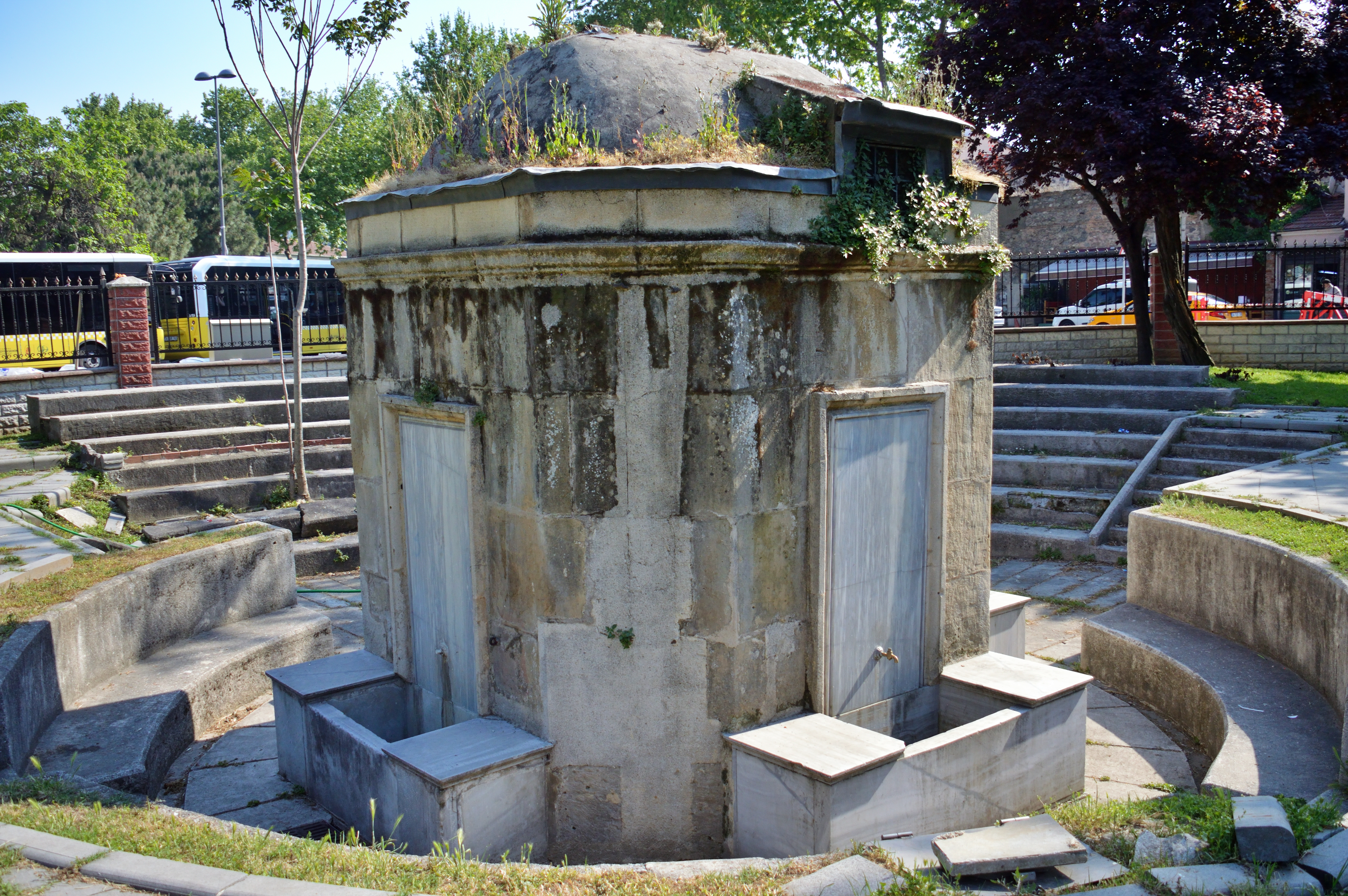

== See also ==
- List of fountains in Istanbul
