= Fountain of Ahmed III (Üsküdar) =

Fountain of Ahmed III in Üsküdar
- Üsküdar III. Ahmet Çeşmesi
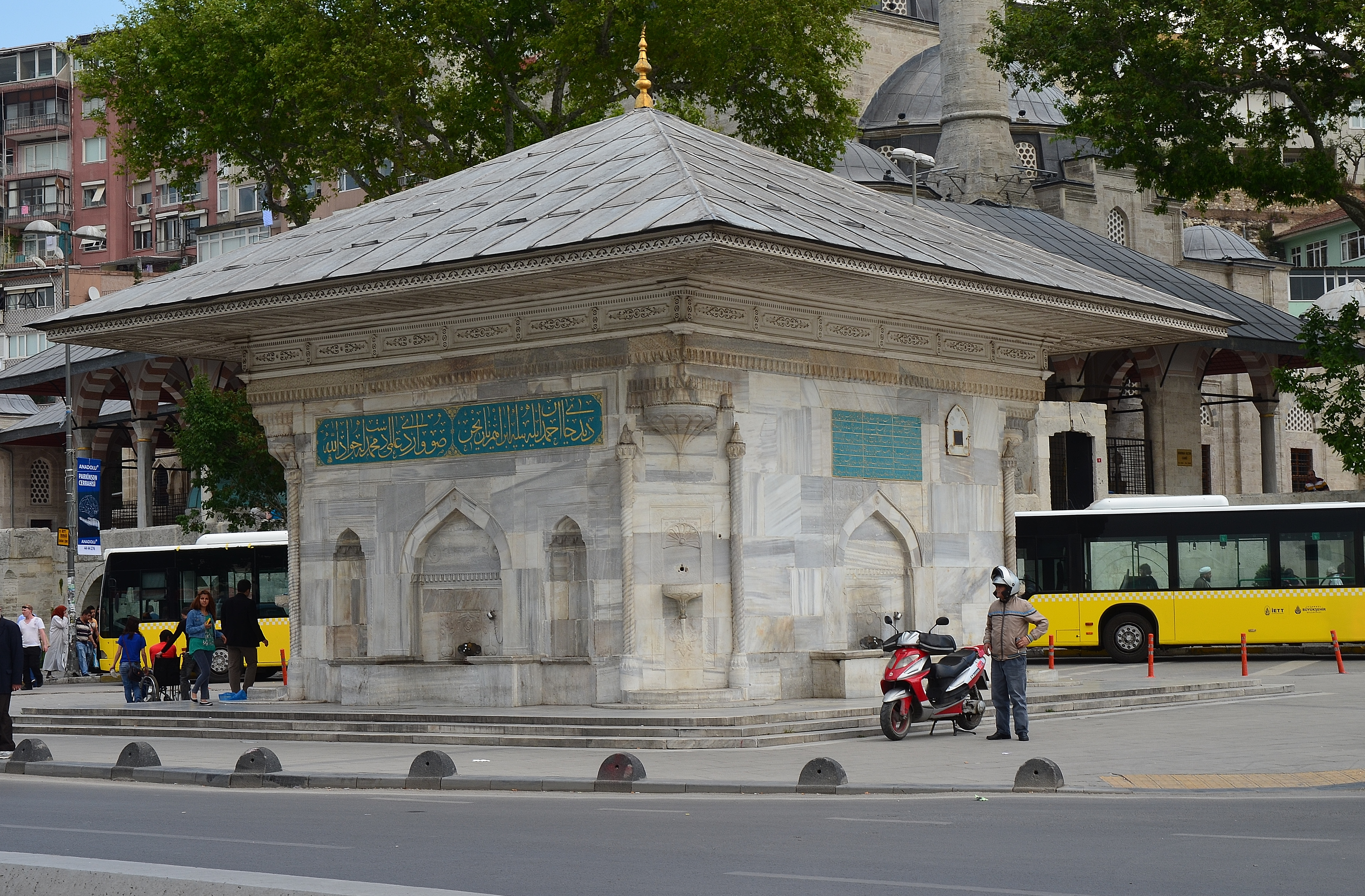
- Fountain of Ahmed III in Üsküdar, Istanbul.

- Location within Istanbul

General information
- Type: Fountain
- Architectural style: Ottoman architecture
- Location: Üsküdar, İskele Meydanı, Istanbul, Turkey
- Coordinates: 41°01′36″N 29°00′55″E
- Completed: 1729; 297 years ago
- Owner: Istanbul Metropolitan Municipality

Height
- Roof: Wooden covered with lead sheet

Technical details
- Material: Marble

Design and construction
- Architect: Kayserli Mehmed Ağa

The Fountain of Sultan Ahmed III in Üsküdar (Turkish: Üsküdar III. Ahmet Çeşmesi) is an 18th-century public water fountain built by Ottoman sultan Ahmed III in the Ottoman rococo architecture and situated in the grand square of Üsküdar in Istanbul, Turkey.

== History ==
Sultan Ahmed III (reigned 1703–1730) commissioned the sebil, a public fountain to provide drinking water for travellers and running water for praying people's ritual washing needs. Completed in 1728–1729, within an era with great importance attached to the construction of many fountains, it was dedicated to the sultan's mother Emetullah Rabia Gülnuş Sultan (1642–1715), who was buried in Üsküdar.

The fountain was initially situated directly on the quay at the waterfront of Bosphorus to serve travellers crossing the Strait. During the redesigning of the area in 1932–1933, the fountain was dismantled and relocated to the center of the nearby square next to the Mihrimah Sultan Mosque.

It underwent two major restorations. In the first one, during its relocation, the broken parts of the fountain were repaired or replaced. The second restoration took place in 1955, when the structure had to be elevated about 1.45 m (4.8 ft) to match the square's ground level. The fountain stands today on a two-step high platform in İskele Square at the intersection of Paşalimanı Street and Hakimiyetimilliye Street.

== Architecture ==
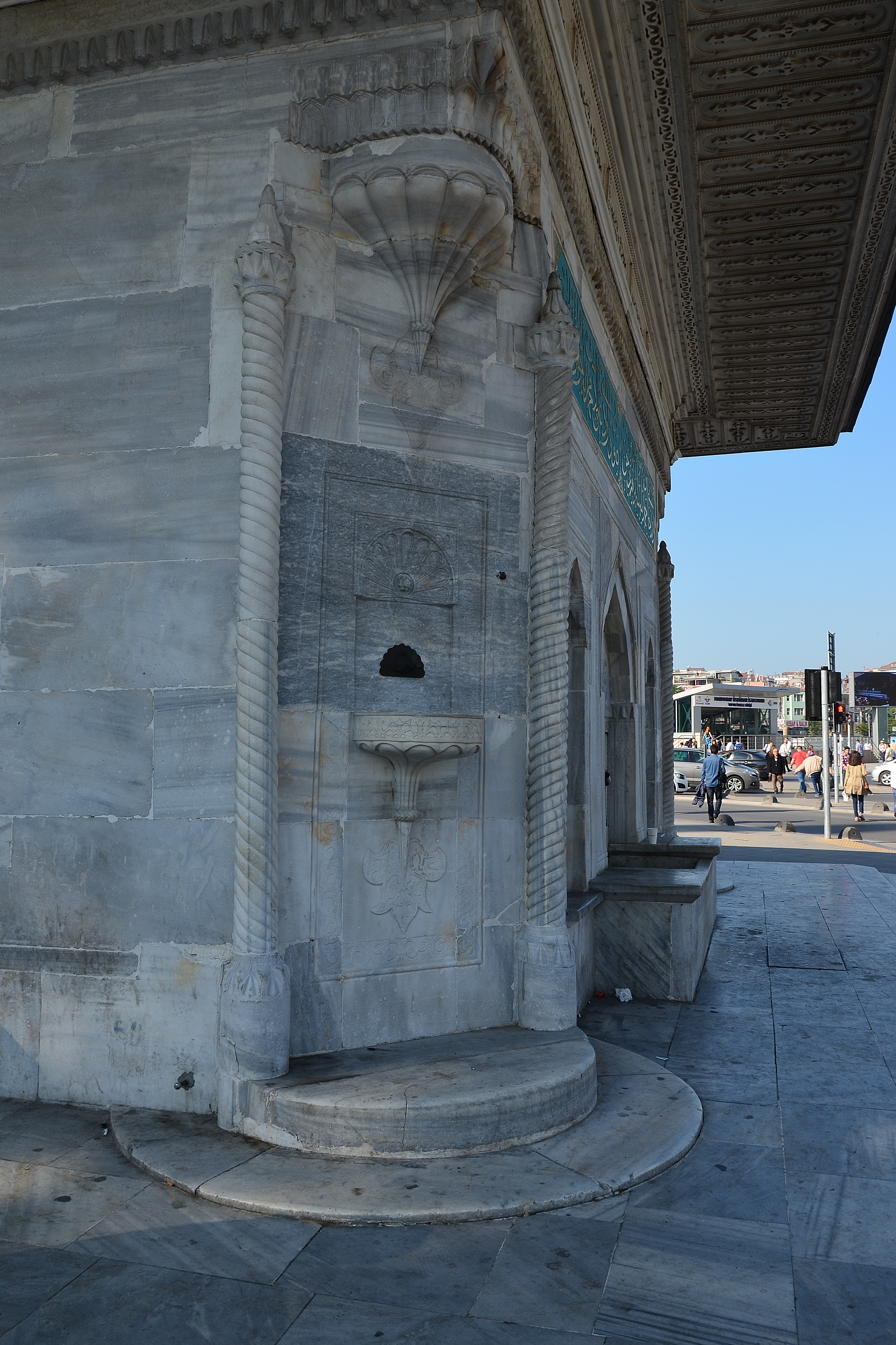
Details of a corner facade: A faucet over a sink flanked by two Solomonic columns topped with Corinthian order capital under a muqarnas. Cornice and eaves with ornaments carved at top.

The fountain was built as a stand-alone structure in the type of a "square fountain" (Turkish: meydan çeşmesi) looking like a monument. It has the form of an octagonal prism with wide four facades and four narrow corner facades. The octagon plan of the fountain at the base turns into a quasi-square form at the top. The square-pyramid formed hip roof has wide eaves on all sides. The fountain is built by solid white marble with a wooden roof covered by lead sheet.

Designed by the court architect Kayserili Mehmed Ağa in the rococo architectural style of Ottoman Tulip Period (1703–1757), it is adorned with ornamentation. Its design shows similarities with the Fountain of Ahmed III (1729) and the Tophane Fountain (1732).

İt features a faucet inside a lancet arch in the middle of each facade over a watering trough to enable for bucket filling, livestock drinking or taking ritual body washing for prayer. The higher-attached faucets over a sink in the four corner facades were designed to spend drinking water for people. In the wall of the main facade, which looks at Bosphorus, there are two semicircular niches on both sides resembling a mosque's mihrab. A number of relief flower motifs as tulips, roses and chrysanthemums in vase adorn the structure. Each of the eight corners of the fountain features a Solomonic column topped with a Corinthian order capital. At the top of the corner facades in between the columns, muqarnas, three-dimensional decorations of Islamic architecture, are placed, which transform the octagon plan of the fountain into a square right under the roof. The wooden roof's eaves features carved ornaments over a cornice encircling the entire structure.

On each of the four wide facades, the fountain features an inscription in Arabic script, which was in use in the Ottoman Empire. The inscriptions on three facades are excerpts from verses of three poets, namely the famous Diwan poet Nedîm (1681?–1730), Şakir and Kırımlı Mustafa Rahmi (died 1750), while the inscription on the main facade contains verses inspired by both Sultan Ahmed III and his son-in-law, Grand Vizier Nevşehirli Damat Ibrahim Pasha (1666–1730). The inscription is written in Jeli Thuluth style of Islamic calligraphy by Sultan Ahmet III himself, who was also a poet and calligrapher. It was signed as "Ahmed ibn-i Mehmed Han" (Ahmed, the son of Khan Mehmed).

The construction date of the fountain can be calculated from the inscriptions by the Abjad system, which assigns numerical values to Arabic letters for purposes of numerology. The calculated value of AH 1141 in Islamic calendar, which was in use in the Ottoman Empire, corresponds to AD 1728–1729.

== See also ==
- List of fountains in Istanbul
