= Fountain of Ahmed III =

Fountain in Istanbul, Turkey

Coordinates: 41°00′29.71″N 28°58′52.36″E

- III. Ahmet Çeşmesi (Turkish)
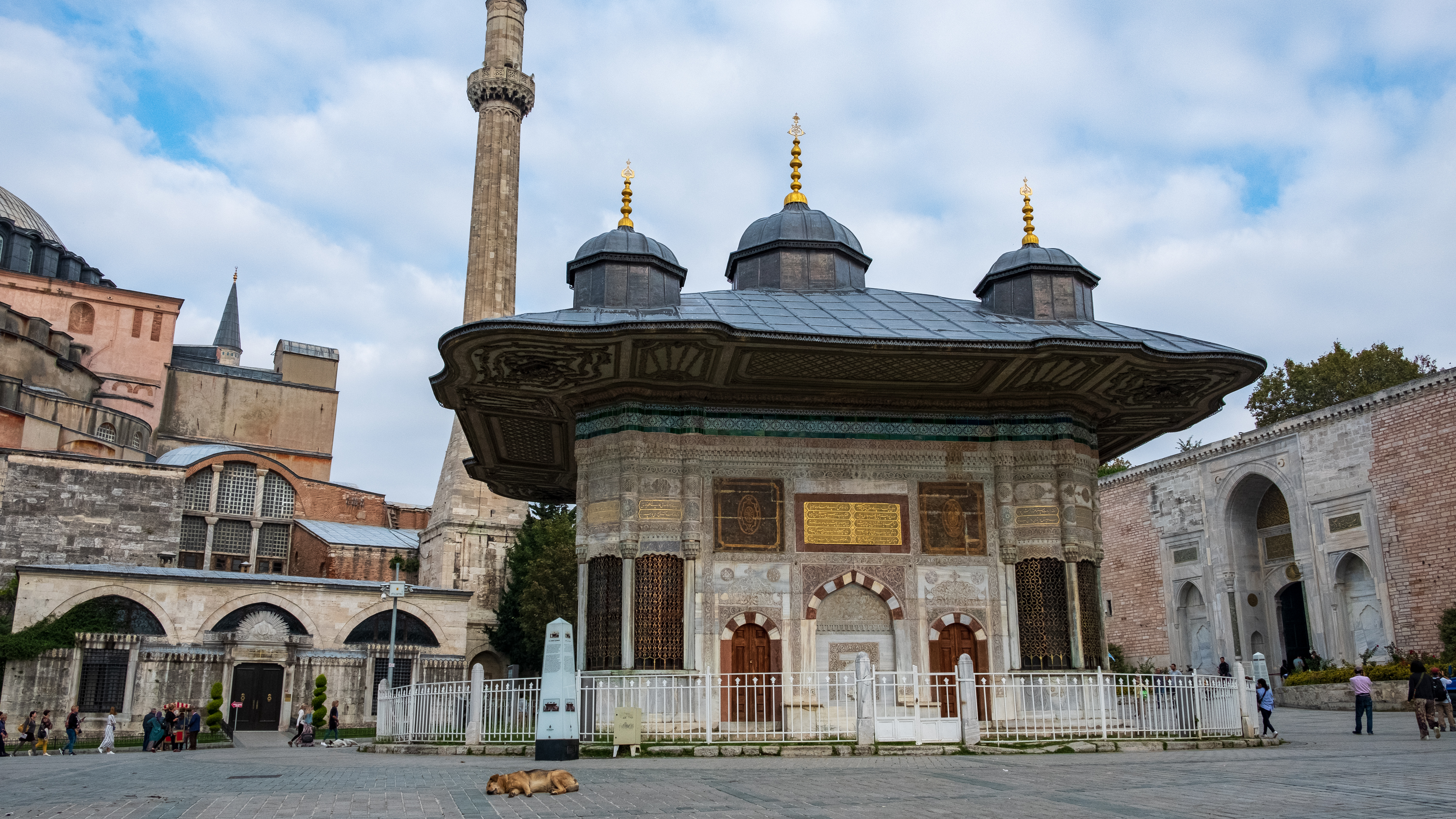
- Fountain of Ahmed III and Hagia Sophia on the left side of the fountain.
- Year: 1728
- Medium: Marble
- Movement: Tulip Period
- Subject: Ahmed III
- Location: Istanbul, Turkey

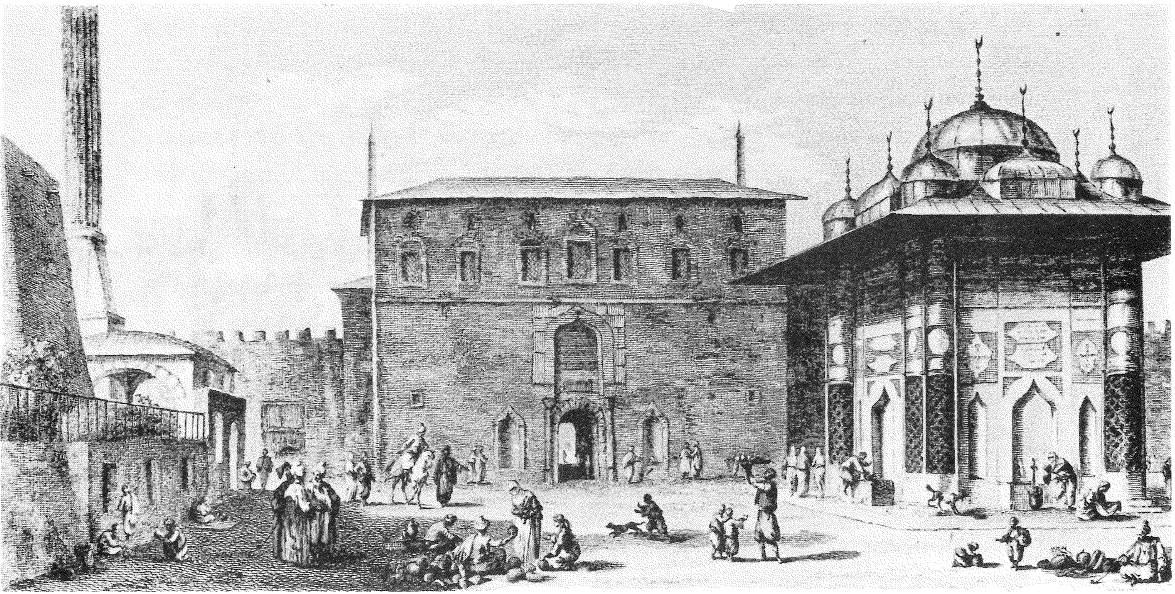
The fountain next to the Imperial Gate, etching by Choiseul-Gouffier.

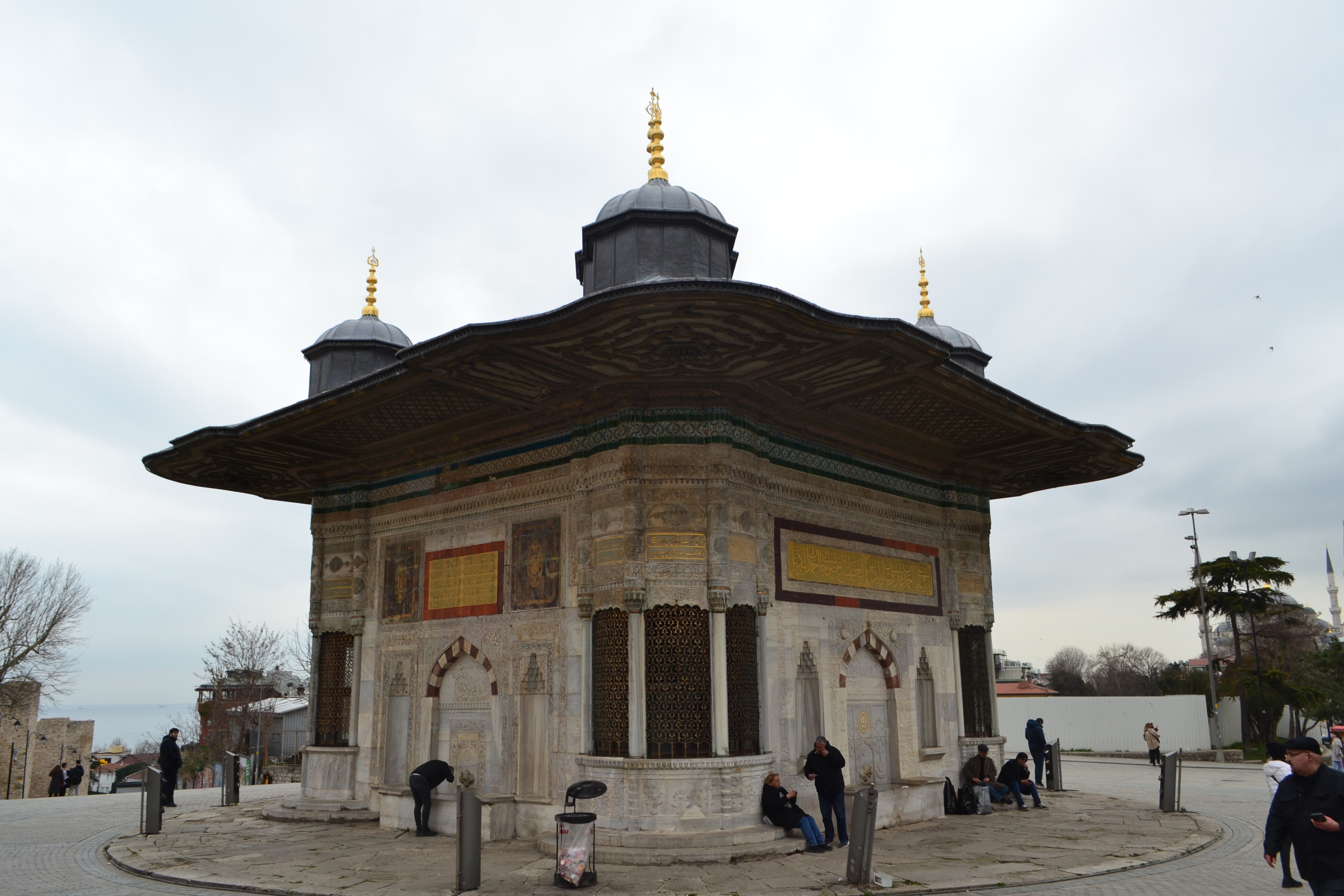
Fountain of Ahmed III and Ishak Pasha Avenue on the Left.

The Fountain of Sultan Ahmed III (Turkish: III. Ahmet Çeşmesi) is a fountain (specifically a sebil) in the great square in front of the Imperial Gate of Topkapı Palace in Istanbul, Turkey. It was built under Ottoman sultan Ahmed III in 1728, in the style of the Tulip period. It was a social centre and gathering place during the Ottoman period of Constantinople.

== History ==
The fountain was built in 1728 under the patronage of Sultan Ahmed III. It is the oldest and most impressive example of the new type of stand-alone fountains that were built during the Tulip Period, mostly between 1728 and 1732. In the same year (1728), Ahmed III also commissioned a similar fountain in Üsküdar, although it has a slightly simpler design.

The fountain was depicted on the reverse of the Turkish 10 lira banknotes of 1947–1952.

== Architecture ==
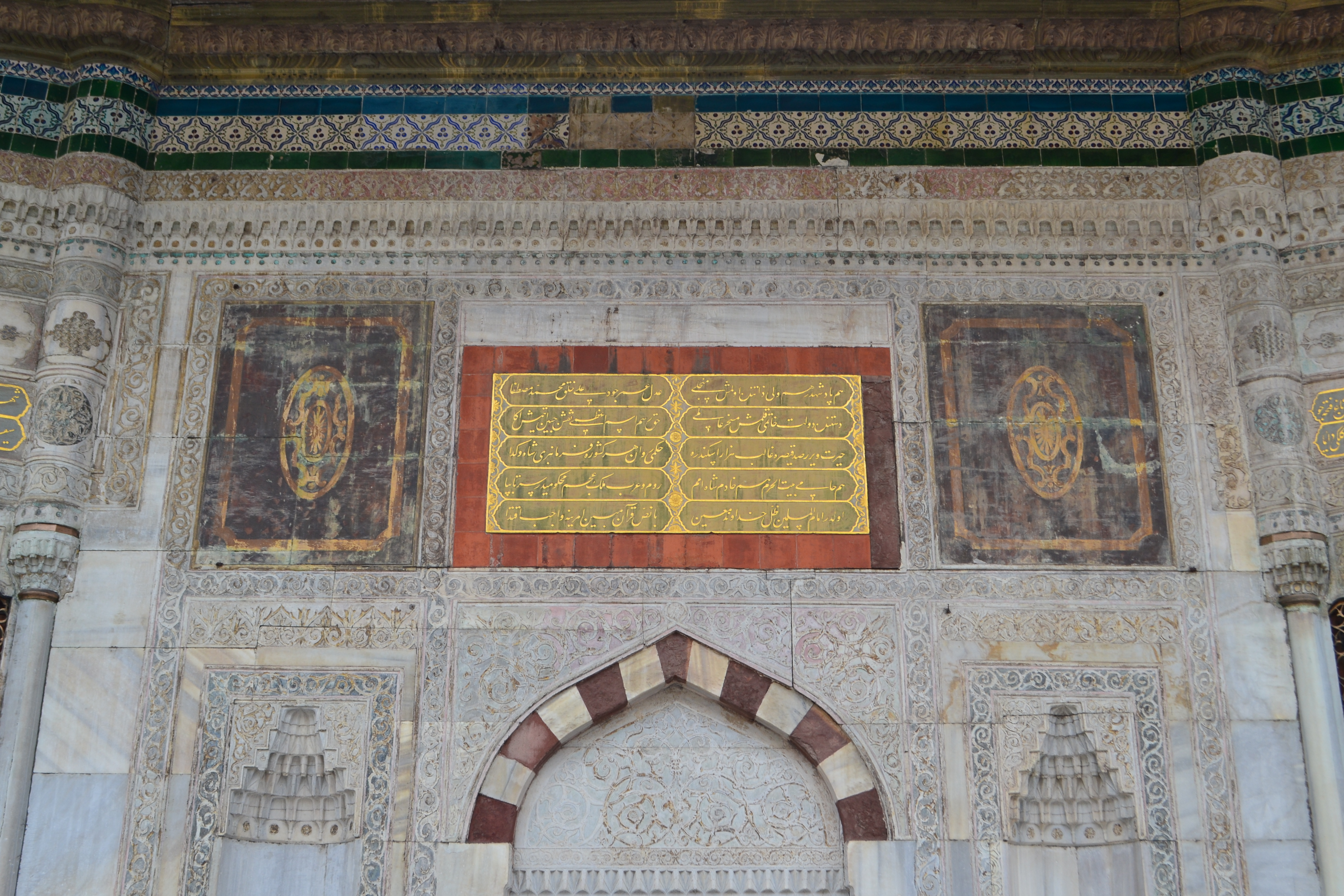
Closeup of the Details.

The fountain is a large square block built with five small domes. Mihrab-shaped niches decorated in low relief with foliate and floral designs in each of the four façades, each containing a drinking fountain (çeşme). The water is supplied from an octagonal pool inside the kiosk, with circulation space around it for kiosk attendants. On each corner is a triple-grilled sebil (from which an attendant issued cups of water or sherbet, free of charge, from behind a grille).

Above the drinking fountains and niches on each façade and sebil are large calligraphic plates bordered with blue and red tiles. Each plate bears stanzas of a 14-line poem dedicated to water and its donor by Seyyid Hüseyin Vehbi bin Ahmed, the chief judge of Halep and Kayseri. It is read clockwise around the fountain, beginning at the northern sebil. The last stanza of the poem the northwest façade is a chronogram composed by Ahmed III.

== See also ==
- List of fountains in Istanbul
