= Lucknow =

Capital of Uttar Pradesh, India

Lucknow Lakhnaū
- Metropolis
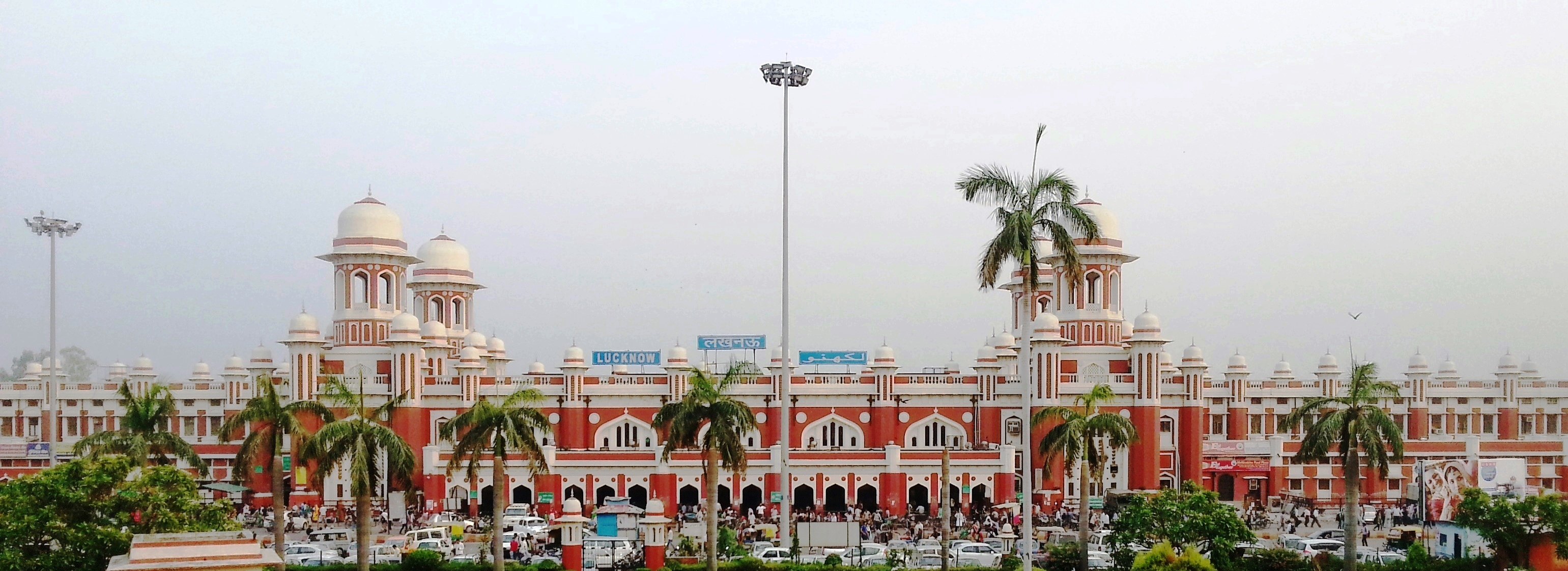
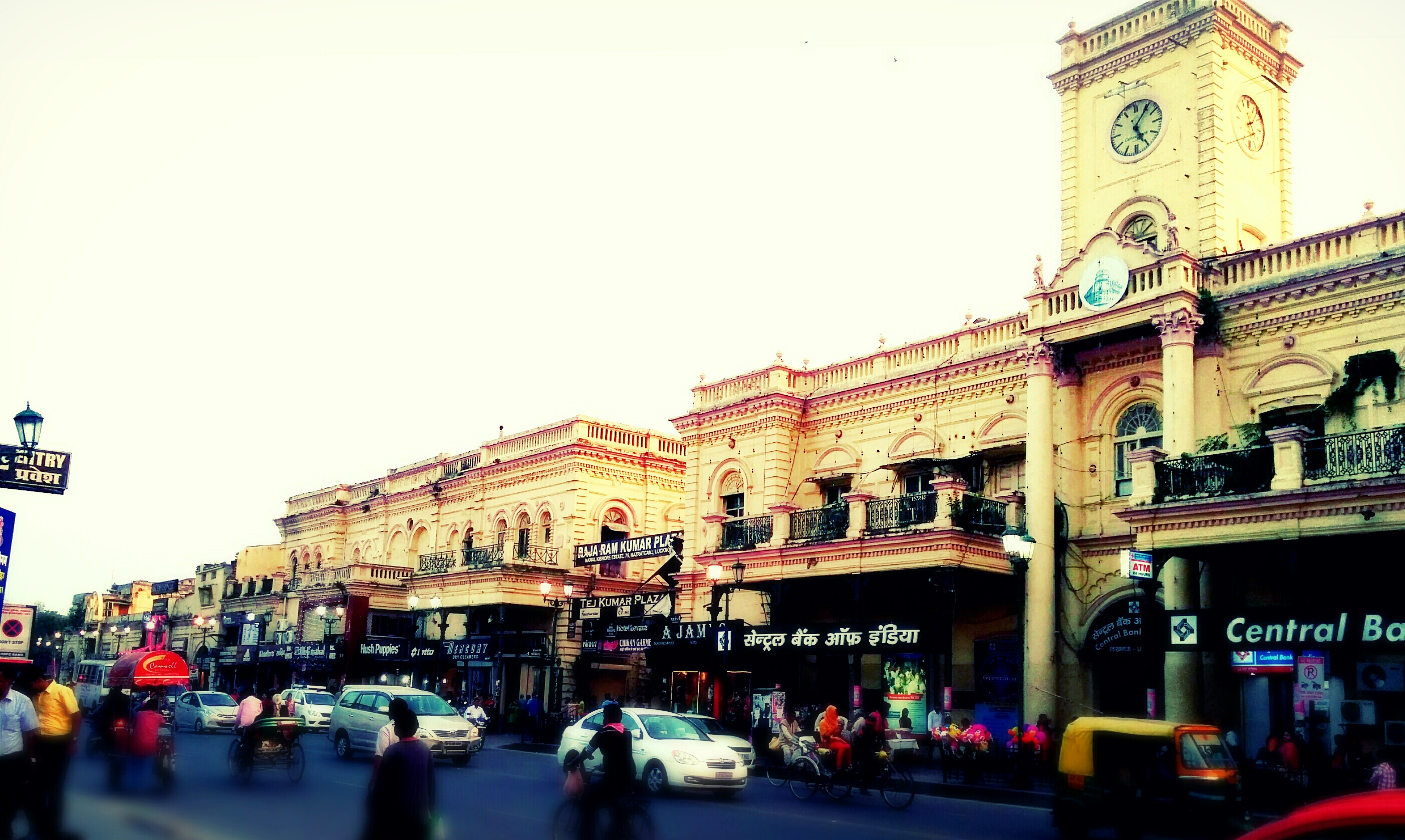
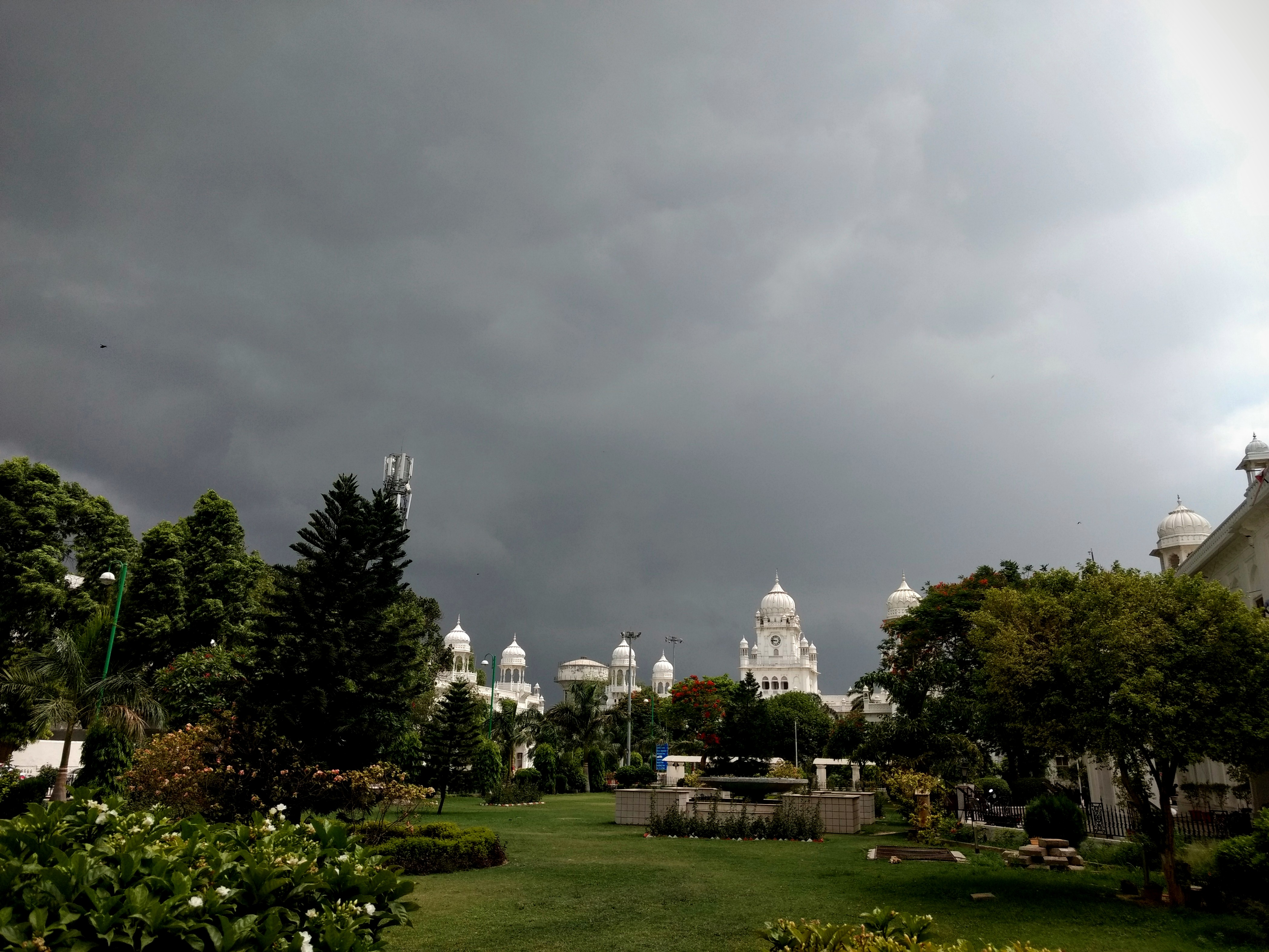
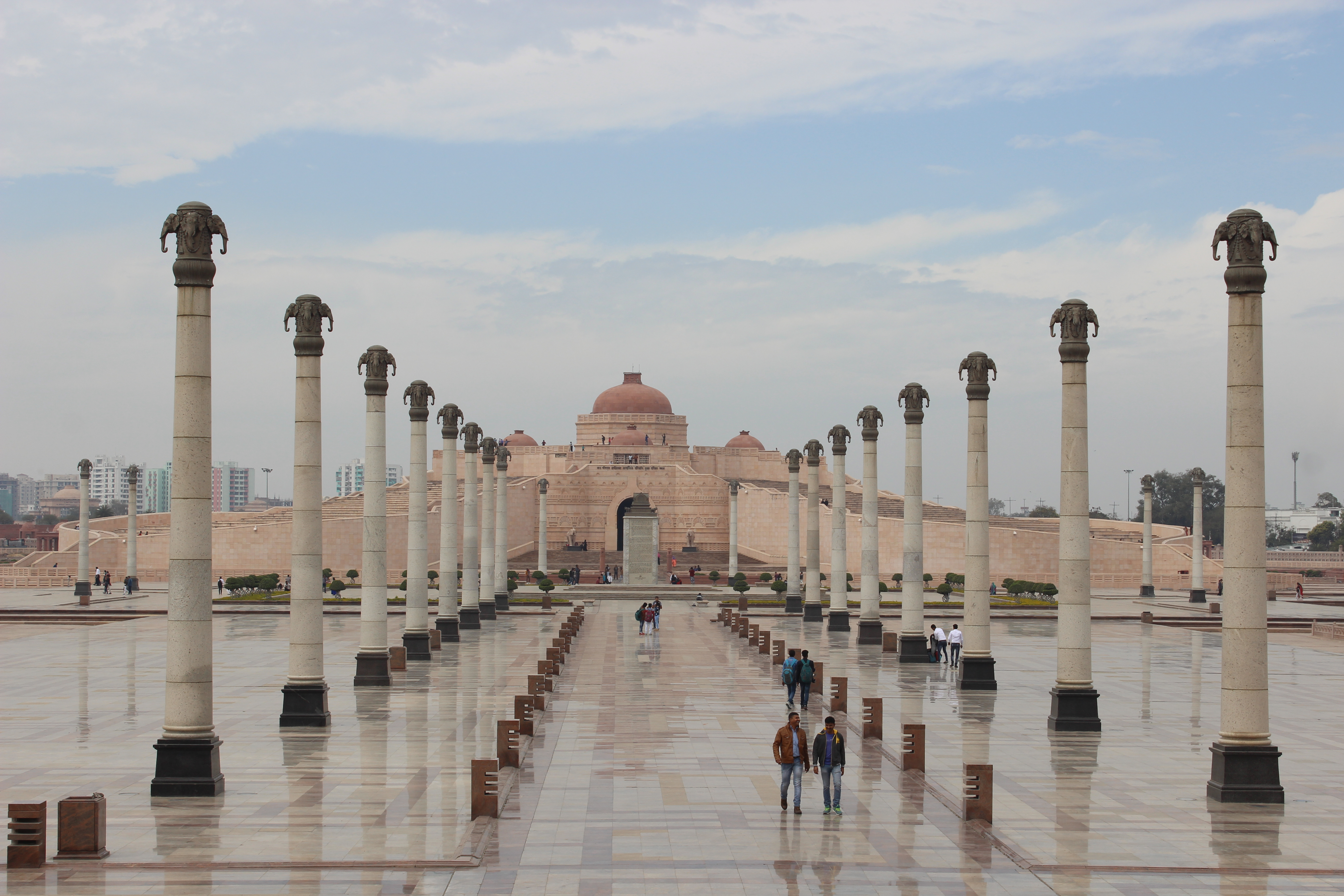
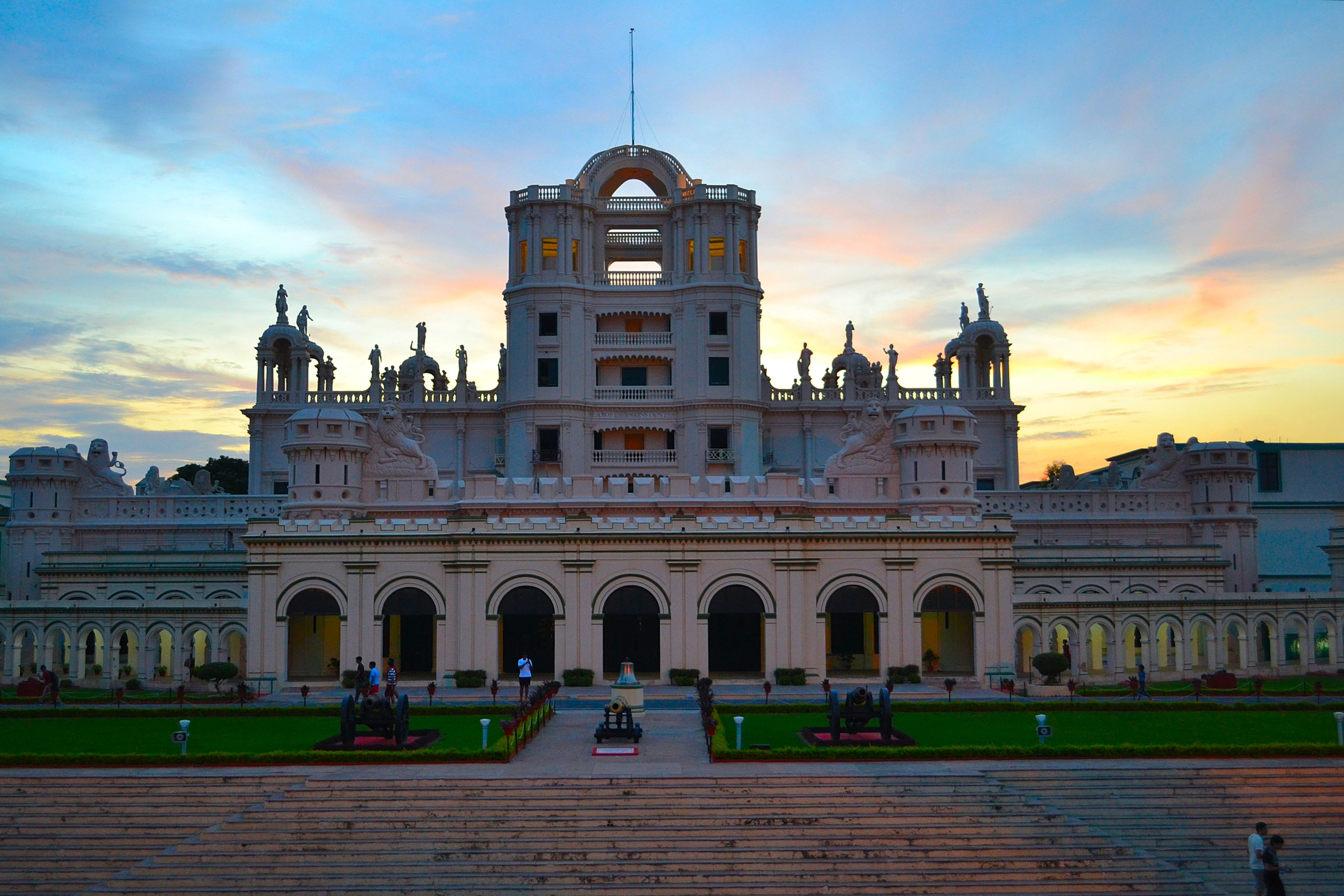
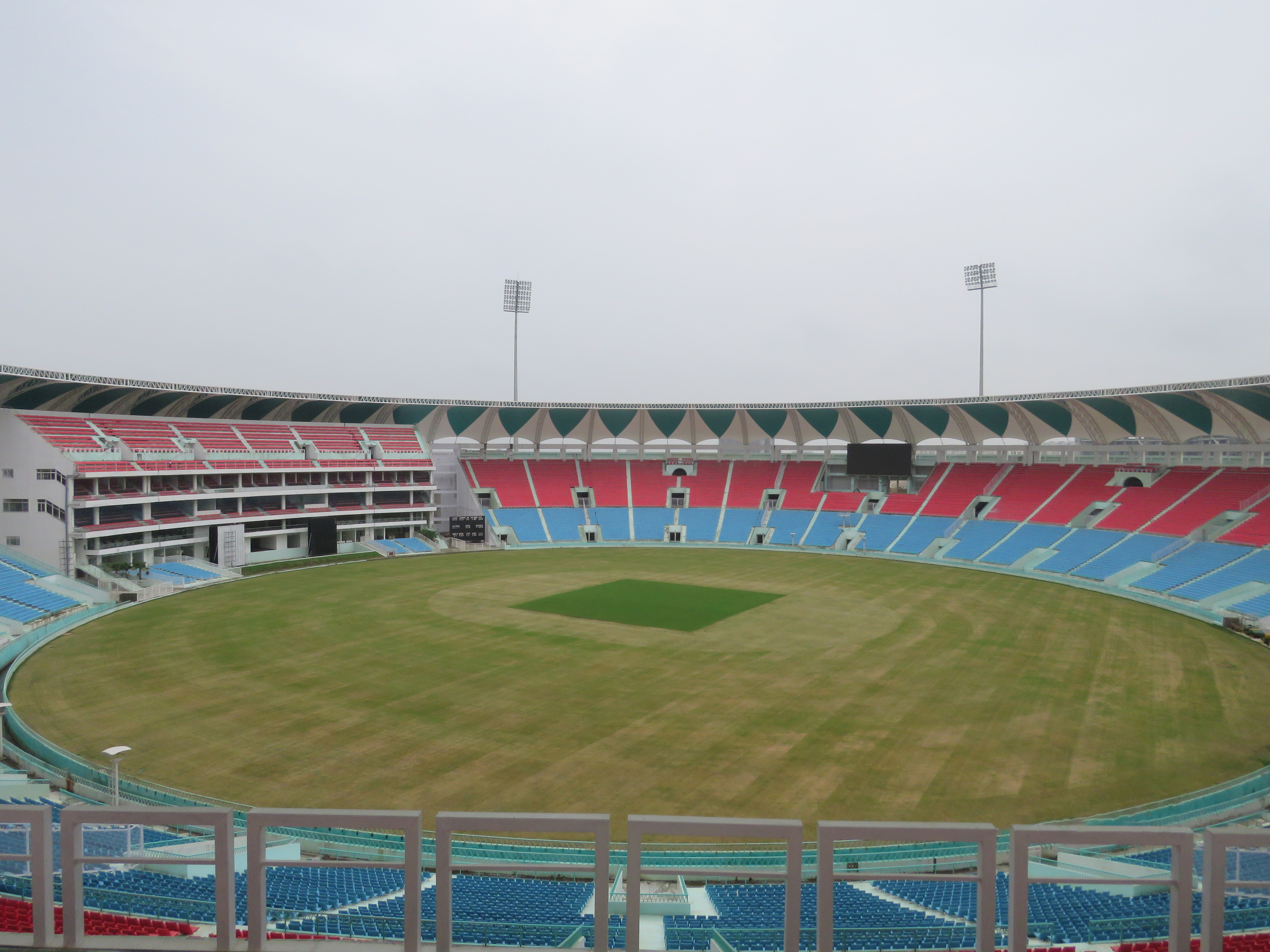
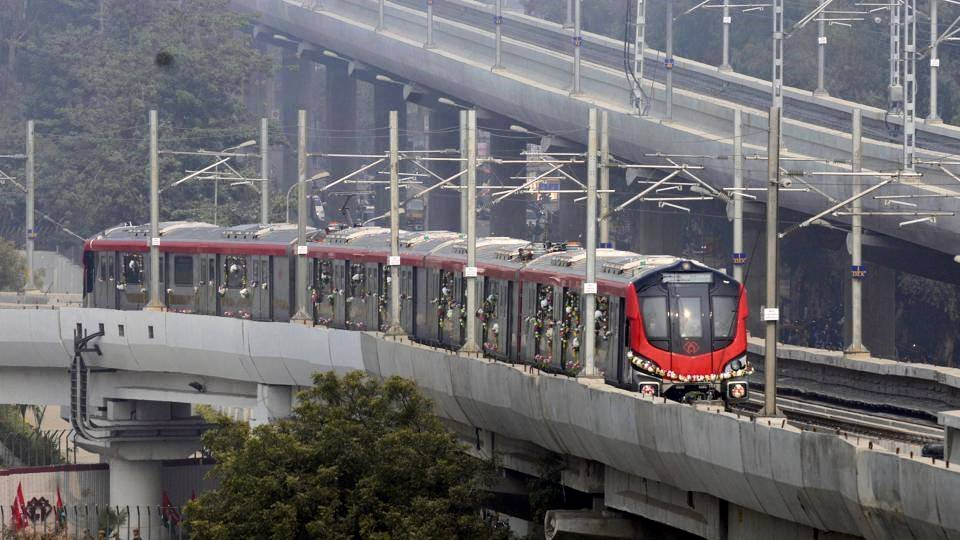
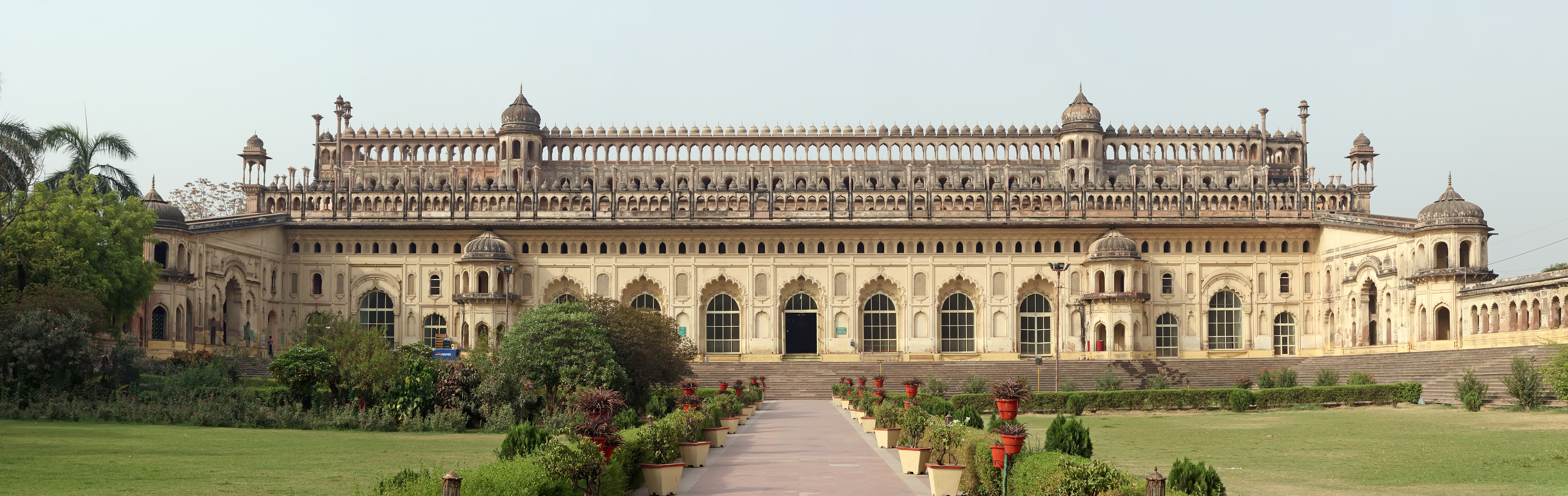
- Lucknow Charbagh railway station Hazratganj Market King George's Medical University Ambedkar Memorial Park La Martinière College Ekana Cricket Stadium Lucknow Metro Bara Imambara
- Nicknames: The City of Nawabs, The Golden City of India, Constantinople of the East, Shiraz-e-Hind
- Interactive map outlining Lucknow district
- Location in Uttar Pradesh Location in India
- Coordinates: 26°51′N 80°57′E
- Country: India
- State: Uttar Pradesh
- Region: Awadh
- Division: Lucknow
- District: Lucknow
- Named for: Lakshmana

Government
  - Type: Municipal Corporation
  - Body: Lucknow Municipal Corporation
  - Mayor: Sushma Kharakwal (BJP)
  - Municipal Commissioner: Gaurav Kumar; IAS

Area
  - Total: 631 km^{2} (244 sq mi)
  - Rank: 5th in India
- Elevation: 123 m (404 ft)

Population (2011)
  - Total: 2,902,601
  - Rank: 11th in India
  - Density: 4,600/km^{2} (11,900/sq mi)
- Demonyms: Lakhnawi; Lucknowite

Language
  - Official: Hindi
  - Additional official: Urdu
  - Regional: Awadhi
- Time zone: UTC+5:30 (IST)
- Pincode(s): 2260xx /2270xx
- Telephone code: +91-522
- Vehicle registration: UP-32/UP-321
- GDP Nominal: $16 billion
- Percapita: $2, 800 or ₹2.29 lakh
- GDP Nominal (Lucknow District): ₹1,31,200 cr(2022–23)
- Sex ratio: 915 ♀/1000 ♂
- Effective literacy rate (2011): 85.5%
- International Cricket Stadium: BRSABV Ekana Cricket Stadium
- Rapid Transit: Lucknow Metro
- International Airport: Chaudhary Charan Singh International Airport
- HDI: ▲0.665 (medium)
- Website: Official website

Lucknow (/ˈlʌknaʊ/ LUK-now; Hindi: Lakhnaū, pronounced [ˈləkʰnə.uː]) is a metropolis and the second largest city of the Indian state of Uttar Pradesh where it serves as the capital and the administrative headquarters of the eponymous district and division. The city had a population of 2.8 million according to the 2011 census, making it the eleventh most populous city and the twelfth-most populous urban agglomeration of India. It is an important centre of education, commerce, aerospace, finance, pharmaceuticals, information technology, design, gastronomy, literature, arts, tourism, music, and poetry. Lucknow, along with Agra and Varanasi, forms the backbone of the Uttar Pradesh Heritage Arc.

In the 6th century BCE, Lucknow was part of Kosala, one of the 16 Mahajanapadas during the late Vedic period. The Nawabs of Lucknow acquired the name after the reign of the third Nawab, when Lucknow became their capital. In 1856, the East India Company moved its troops to the border, then annexed the state of Awadh, alleging maladministration. Awadh was placed under a chief commissioner. Lucknow was one of the major centres of the Indian Rebellion of 1857 and actively participated in India's independence movement, emerging as a strategically important North Indian city. The city witnessed the first meeting of Mahatma Gandhi, Jawaharlal Nehru, and Muhammad Ali Jinnah during the 1916 Congress session, when the Lucknow Pact was signed.

There are many software and IT companies in the city. Lucknow is an emerging hub of automobile manufacturing. It is the headquarters of the Central Command of the Indian Army. It is the home of several prominent educational and research institutes and universities, including the IIM Lucknow, the Indian Institute of Information Technology, Lucknow, AKTU and the Central Drug Research Institute. Lucknow is designated as a City of Gastronomy by UNESCO.

== Toponymy ==
"Lucknow" is the anglicised spelling of the local pronunciation "Lakhnau". According to one legend, the city is named after Lakshmana, a hero of the Hindu epic Ramayana. The legend states that Lakshmana had a palace or an estate in the area, which was called Lakshmanapuri (Sanskrit: लक्ष्मणपुरी, lit. Lakshmana's city). The settlement came to be known as Lakhanpur (or Lachhmanpur) by the 11th century, and later, Lucknow.

A similar theory states that the city was known as Lakshmanavati (Sanskrit: लक्ष्मणवती, fortunate) after Lakshmana. The name changed to Lakhanavati, then Lakhnauti and finally Lakhnau. Yet another theory states that the city's name is connected with Lakshmi, the Hindu goddess of wealth. Over time, the name changed to Laksmanauti, Laksmnaut, Lakhsnaut, Lakhsnau and, finally, Lakhnau.

Another theory is that Lucknow was named after a very influential architect named Lakhna Ahir, who built the fort Qila Lakhna.

== History ==
From the sixth to the fourth century BCE, Lucknow was part of the realm of Kosala, one of the 16 Mahajanapadas in the Late Vedic period.

From 1350 onwards, Lucknow and parts of the Awadh region were ruled by the Delhi Sultanate, Sharqi Sultanate, Mughal Empire, Nawabs of Awadh, the British East India Company and the British Raj.

For about eighty-four years (from 1394 to 1478), Awadh was part of the Sharqi Sultanate of Jaunpur. Emperor Humayun made it a part of the Mughal Empire around 1555. Emperor Jahangir (1569–1627) granted an estate in Awadh to a favoured nobleman, Sheikh Abdul Rahim, who later built Machchi Bhawan on this estate. It later became the seat of power from where his descendants, the Sheikhzadas, controlled the region.

The Nawabs of Lucknow acquired the name after the reign of the third Nawab when Lucknow became their capital. The city became North India's cultural capital, and its nawabs, best remembered for their refined and extravagant lifestyles, were patrons of the arts.

Under their dominion, music and dance flourished, and construction of numerous monuments took place. Of the monuments standing today, the Bara Imambara, the Chota Imambara, and the Rumi Darwaza are notable examples. One of the Nawab's enduring legacies is the region's syncretic Hindu–Muslim culture that has come to be known as the Ganga-Jamuni Tehzeeb.

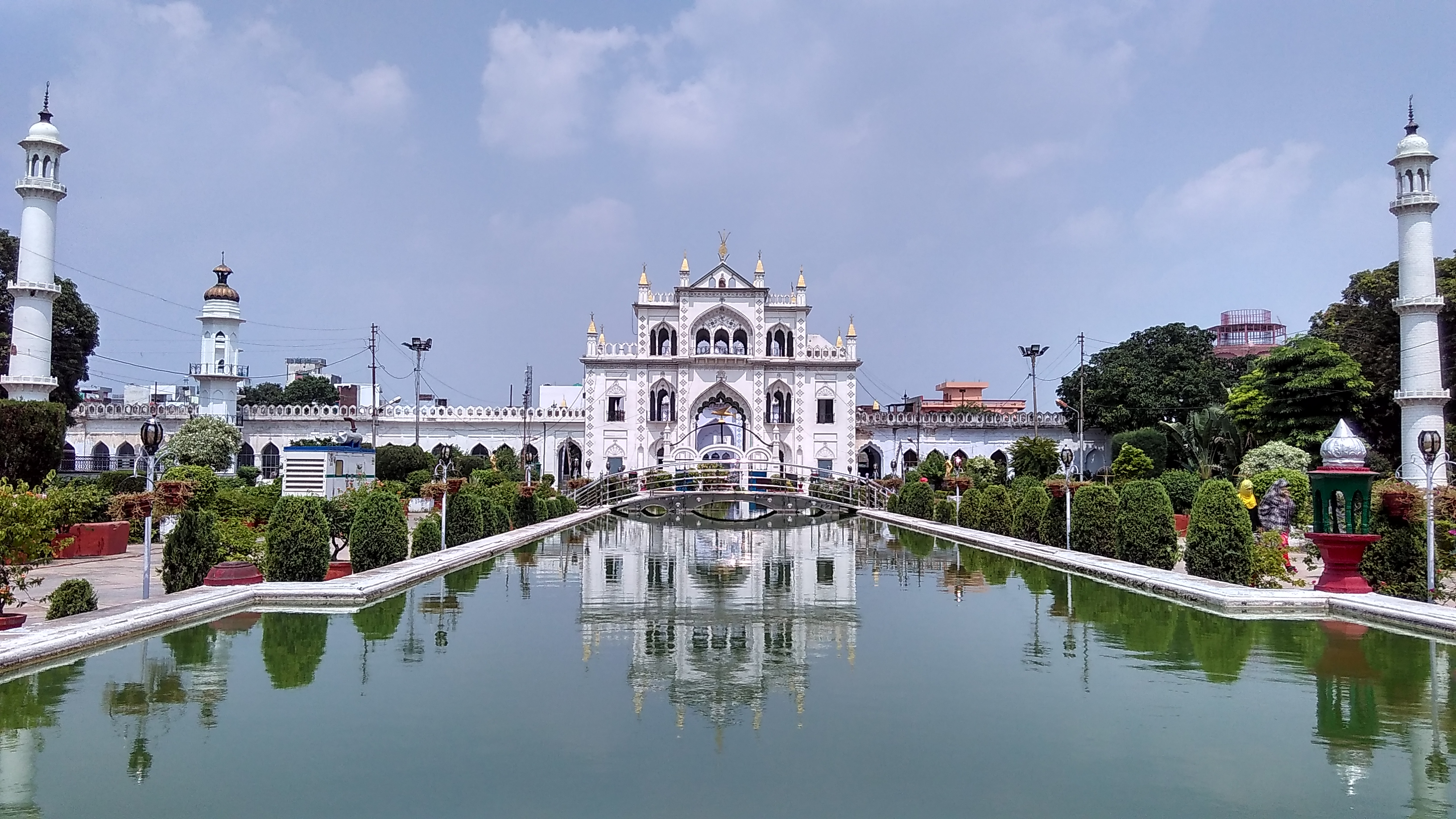
Chota Imambara is a Shia Muslim Hussainiya and a mausoleum for Muhammad Ali Shah.

Until 1719, the subah of Awadh was a province of the Mughal Empire administered by a governor appointed by the emperor. Persian adventurer Saadat Khan, also known as Burhan-ul-Mulk, was appointed Nizam of Awadh in 1722 and established his court in Faizabad, near Lucknow.

Many independent kingdoms, such as Awadh, were established as the Mughal Empire disintegrated. The third Nawab, Shuja-ud-Daula (r. 1753–1775), fell out with the British after aiding the fugitive Nawab of Bengal, Mir Qasim. Roundly defeated at the Battle of Buxar by the East India Company, he was forced to pay heavy penalties and surrender parts of his territory. Awadh's capital, Lucknow rose to prominence when Asaf-ud-Daula, the fourth Nawab, shifted his court to the city from Faizabad in 1775. The British East India Company appointed a resident in 1773 and by the early 19th century gained control of more territory and authority in the state.

They were, however, disinclined to capture Awadh outright and come face to face with the Maratha Empire and the remnants of the Mughal Empire. In 1798, the fifth Nawab Wazir Ali Khan alienated both his people and the British and was forced to abdicate. The British then helped Saadat Ali Khan take the throne. He became a puppet king, and in a treaty of 1801, yielded a large part of Awadh to the East India Company while also agreeing to disband his own troops in favour of a hugely expensive, British-controlled army.

This treaty effectively made the state of Awadh a vassal of the East India Company, although it continued to be part of the Mughal Empire in name until 1819. The treaty of 1801 proved a beneficial arrangement for the East India Company as they gained access to Awadh's vast treasuries, repeatedly digging into them for loans at reduced rates. In addition, the revenues from running Awadh's armed forces brought them useful returns while the territory acted as a buffer state. The Nawabs were ceremonial kings, busy with pomp and show. By the mid-nineteenth century, however, the British had grown impatient with the arrangement and demanded direct control over Awadh.

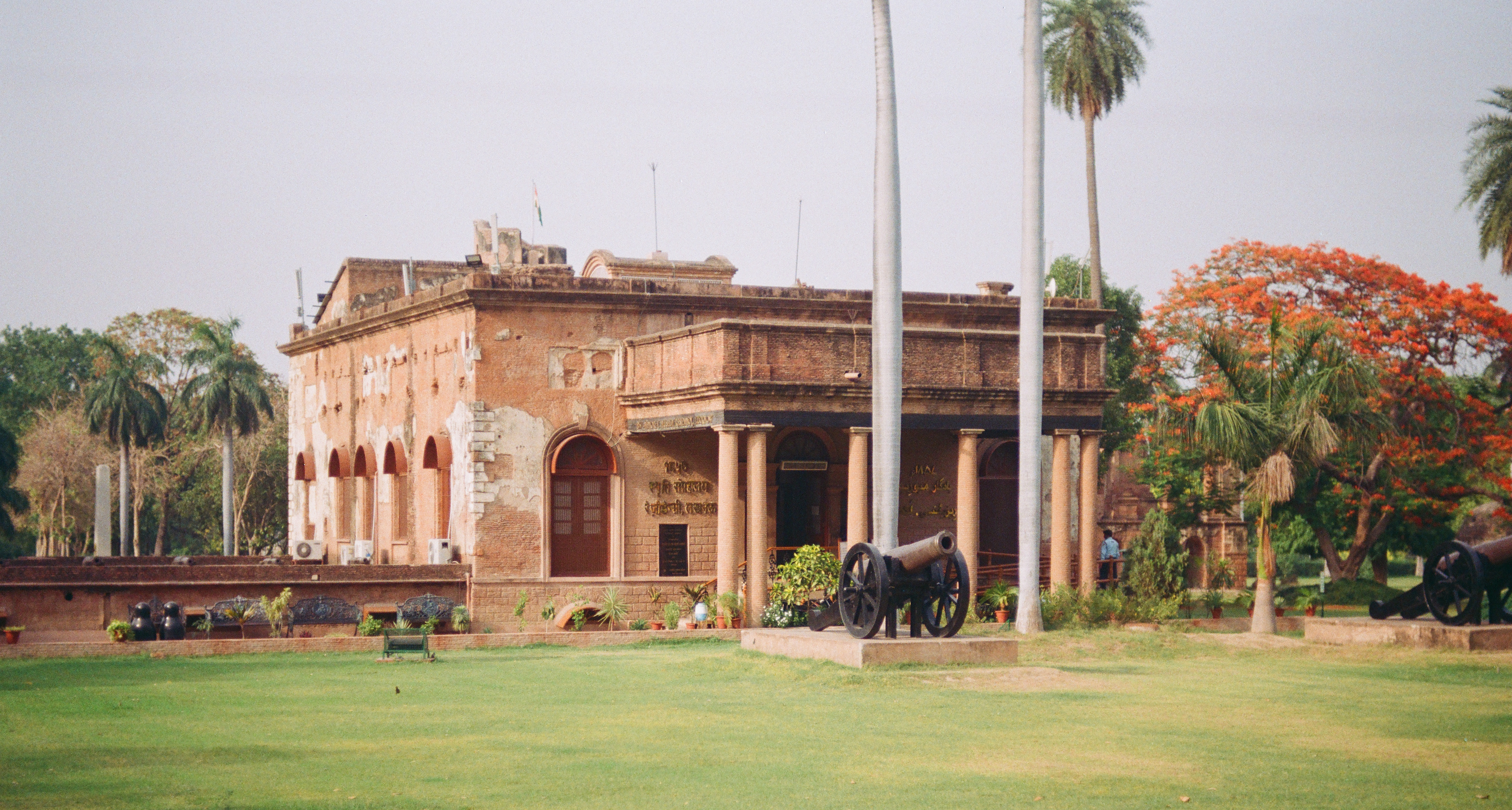
The ruins of the Residency at Lucknow show evidence of the gunfire sustained during the rebellion.

In 1856, the East India Company first moved its troops to the border, then annexed the state for alleged maladministration. Awadh was placed under a chief commissioner – Sir Henry Lawrence. Wajid Ali Shah, the then Nawab, was imprisoned, then exiled by the East India Company to Calcutta. In the subsequent Indian Rebellion of 1857, his 14-year-old son Birjis Qadra, whose mother was Begum Hazrat Mahal, was crowned ruler. Following the rebellion's defeat, Begum Hazrat Mahal and other rebel leaders sought asylum in Nepal.

It is the most important centre of Shia Islam in the Indian Subcontinent and has influence of Persian, Shiite, Arabic and British culture and tradition in the architecture, language and customs.

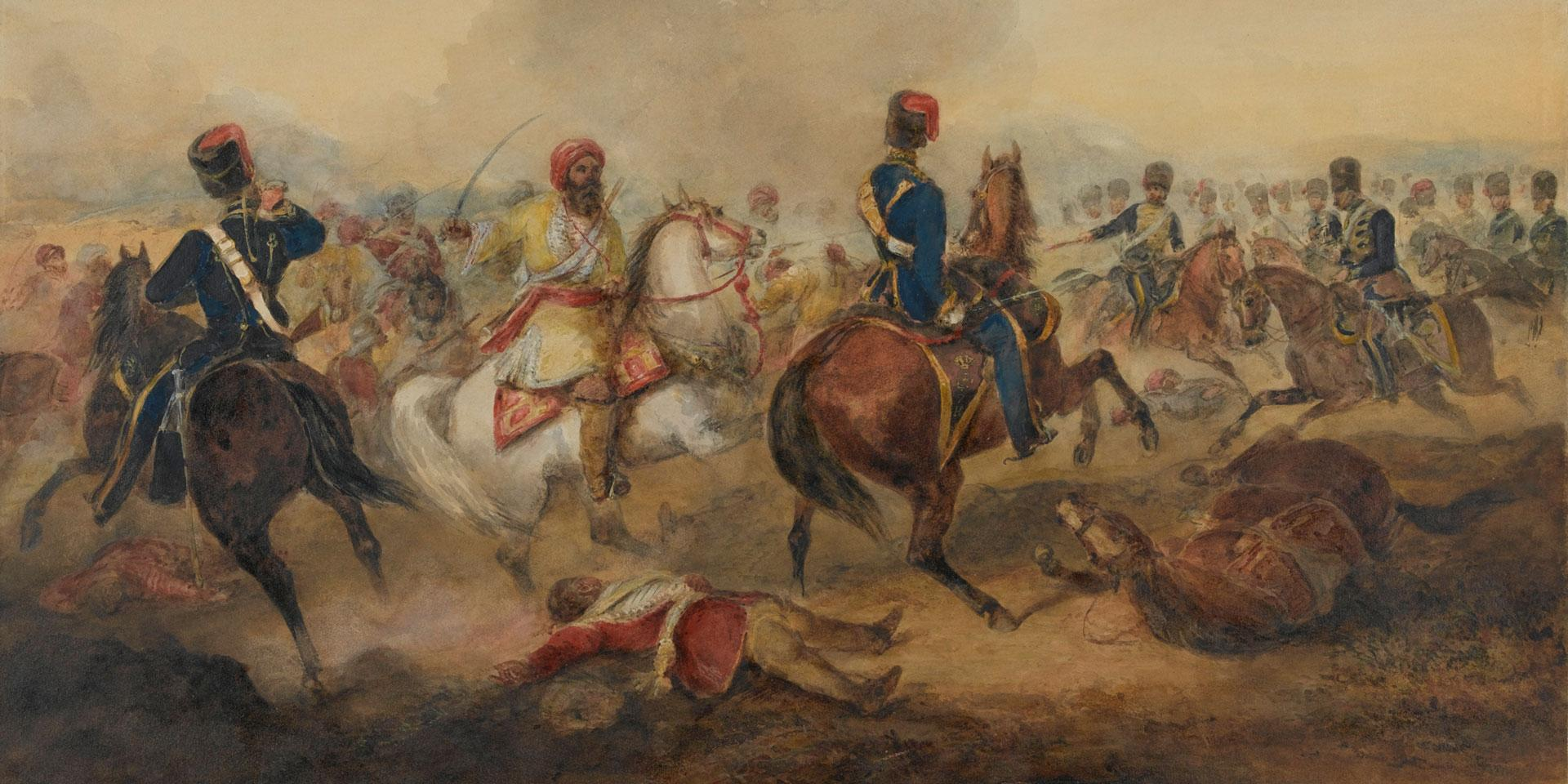
7th Hussars, charging a body of the Mutineer's Cavalry, Alambagh, Lucknow

As a major centre of the Indian Rebellion of 1857 and India's independence movement, Lucknow emerged as an important North Indian city. During the Rebellion, the majority of the East India Company's troops were recruited from both the people and nobility of Awadh. The rebels seized control of the state, and it took the British 18 months to reconquer the region. During that period, the garrison based at the Residency in Lucknow was besieged by rebel forces during the Siege of Lucknow. The siege was relieved first by forces under the command of Sir Henry Havelock and Sir James Outram, followed by a stronger force under Sir Colin Campbell. Today, the ruins of the Residency and the Shaheed Smarak offer an insight into Lucknow's role in the events of 1857.

With the rebellion over, Oudh returned to British governance under a chief commissioner. In 1877, the offices of lieutenant-governor of the North-Western Provinces and chief commissioner of Oudh were combined; then in 1902, the title of chief commissioner was dropped with the formation of the United Provinces of Agra and Oudh, although Oudh still retained some marks of its former independence.

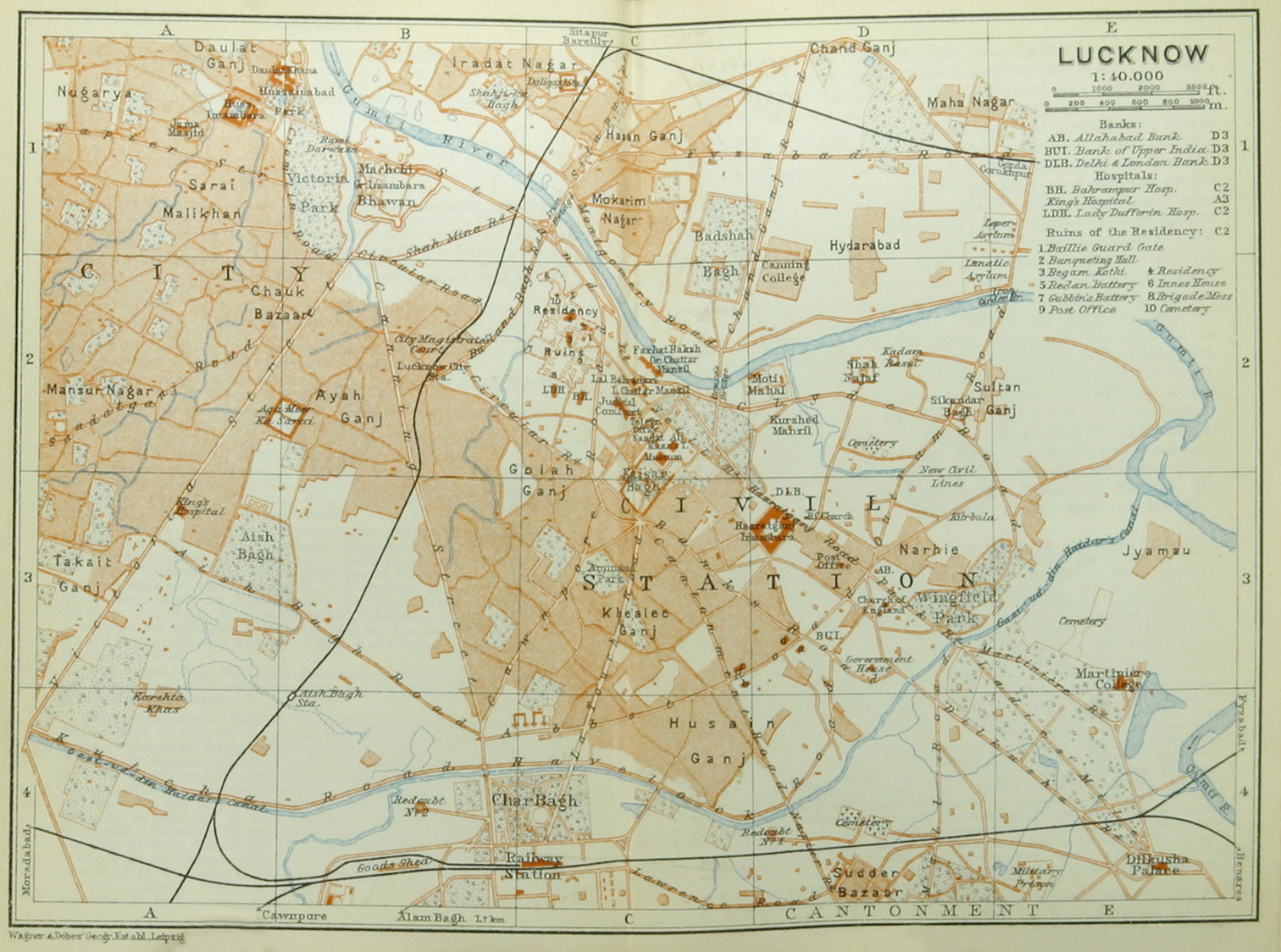
Map of parts of the Old City and the Civil Station, ca 1914

The Khilafat Movement had an active base of support in Lucknow, creating united opposition to British rule, to create a Caliphate. In 1901, after remaining the capital of Oudh since 1775, Lucknow, with a population of 264,049, was merged into the newly formed United Provinces of Agra and Oudh. In 1920, the provincial seat of government moved from Allahabad to Lucknow. Upon Indian independence in 1947, the United Provinces were reorganised into the state of Uttar Pradesh, and Lucknow remained its capital.

Lucknow witnessed some of the pivotal moments in the history of India. One is the first meeting of the stalwarts Mahatma Gandhi, Jawaharlal Nehru and Mohd Ali Jinnah during the Indian National Congress session of 1916 (the Lucknow pact was signed and moderates and extremists came together through the efforts of Annie Besant during this session only). The Congress President for that session, Ambica Charan Majumdar in his address said that "If the Congress was buried at Surat, it is reborn in Lucknow in the garden of Wajid Ali Shah."

The Kakori conspiracy involving Ram Prasad Bismil, Ashfaq Ullah Khan, Rajendra Nath Lahiri, Roshan Singh and others, followed by the Kakori trial which captured the imagination of the country, also took place in Lucknow.

Culturally, Lucknow has also had a tradition of courtesans, with popular culture distilling it in the avatar of the fictional Umrao Jaan.

Along with the rest of India, Lucknow became independent from Britain on 15 August 1947. It has been listed as the 17th-fastest growing city in India and 74th in the world.

== Geography ==
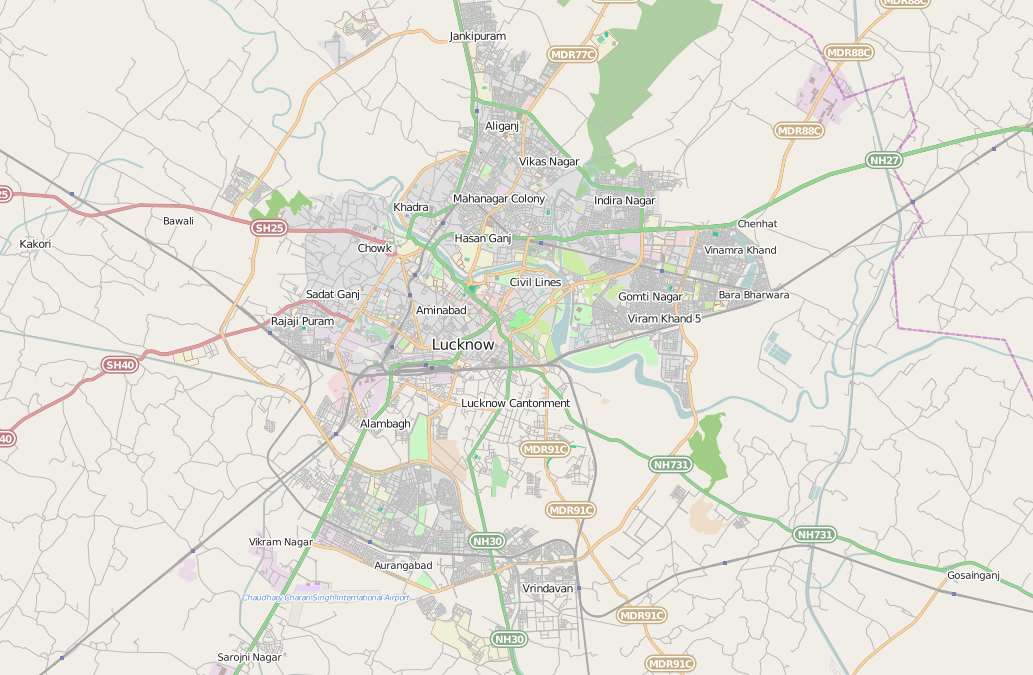
Map of Lucknow city

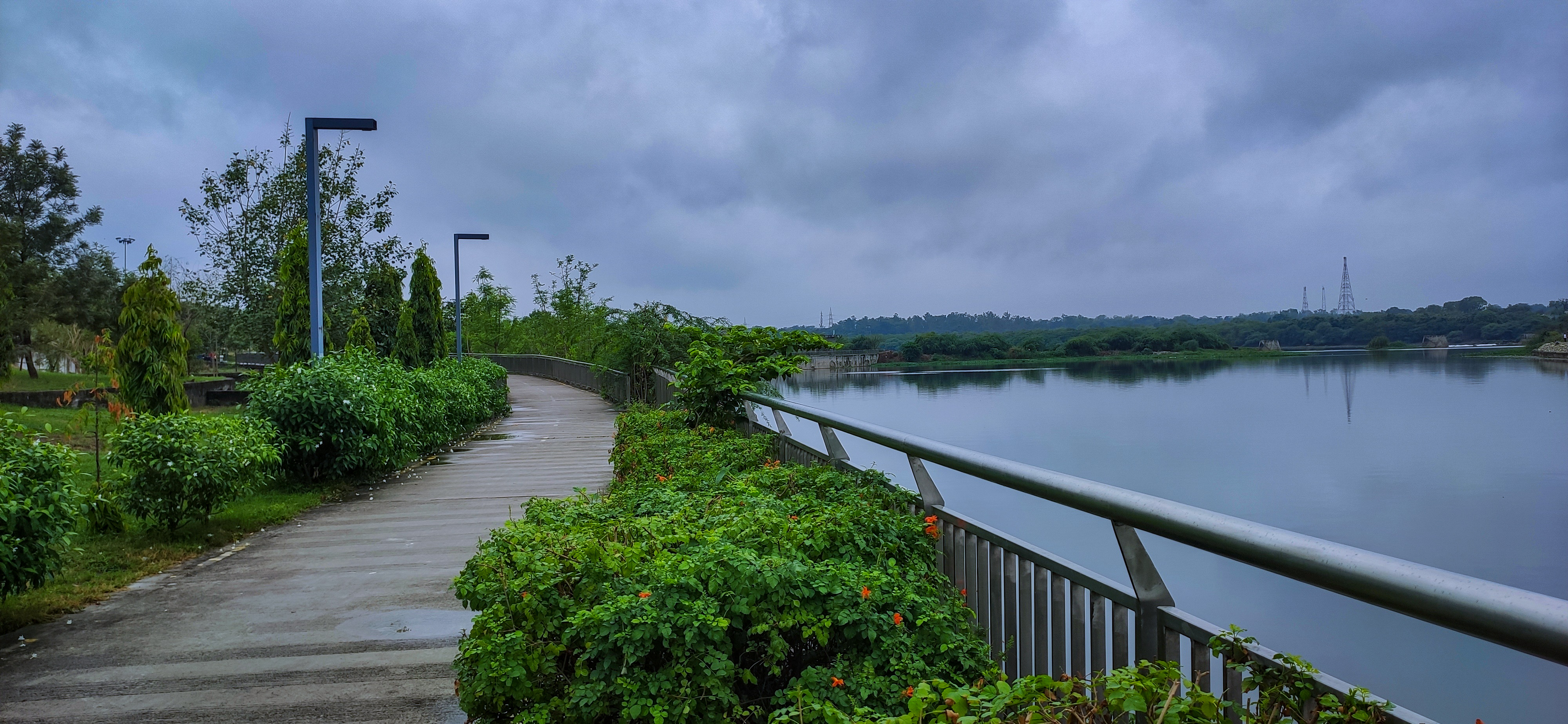
Gomti Riverfront

The Gomti River, Lucknow's chief geographical feature, meanders through the city and divides it into the Trans-Gomti and Cis-Gomti regions. Situated in the middle of the Indus-Gangetic Plain, the city is surrounded by rural towns and villages: the orchard town of Malihabad, Kakori, Mohanlalganj, Gosainganj, Chinhat and Itaunja. To the east lies Barabanki, to the west Unnao, to the south Raebareli, while to the north lie the Sitapur and Hardoi. Lucknow city is located in a seismic zone III.

Lucknow stands at an elevation of approximately 123 metres (404 ft) above sea level. The city had an area of 402 km^{2} (155 square miles) until December 2019, when 88 villages were added to the municipal limits and the area increased to 631 km^{2} (244 square miles).

As of 2008, there were 110 wards in the city. Morphologically, three clear demarcations exist: the central business district is a fully built up area, comprising Hazratganj, Aminabad and Chowk; a middle zone surrounds the inner zone with concrete houses, while the outer zone consists of villages.

=== Climate ===
Lucknow has a humid subtropical climate (Köppen Cwa) with cool, dry winters from late November to February and dry, hot summers with sunshine from late March to early June. More than nine-tenths of the annual rainfall occurs from July to October when the city receives an average of 827.2 millimetres (32.57 in) from the southwest monsoon winds, although occasionally frontal rainfall from the northeast monsoon may occur in January. In winter the maximum temperature is around 25 °C or 77 °F and the minimum is in the 3 to 7 °C (37.4 to 44.6 °F) range.

Fog is quite common from mid-December to late January. Occasionally, Lucknow experiences colder winter spells than places like Shimla and Mussoorie, which are situated high up in the Himalayas.

In the extraordinary winter cold spell of 2012–2013, Lucknow recorded temperatures below freezing point on two consecutive days and the minimum temperature hovered near freezing point for over a week. Summers are very hot with temperatures rising into the 40 to 45 °C (104 to 113 °F) range, the average maximum in the high 30s Celsius.

Lucknow has been ranked as the fourth best city in "National Clean Air City" (under Category 1 >10L Population cities) in India.

Climate data for Lucknow (Chaudhary Charan Singh International Airport) 1991–2020, extremes 1952–present
Month	Jan	Feb	Mar	Apr	May	Jun	Jul	Aug	Sep	Oct	Nov	Dec	Year
Record high °C (°F)	31.6 (88.9)	35.9 (96.6)	41.1 (106.0)	45.0 (113.0)	46.5 (115.7)	47.7 (117.9)	44.2 (111.6)	40.4 (104.7)	40.1 (104.2)	38.7 (101.7)	38.0 (100.4)	29.9 (85.8)	47.7 (117.9)
Mean daily maximum °C (°F)	21.4 (70.5)	26.2 (79.2)	32.2 (90.0)	38.2 (100.8)	39.9 (103.8)	38.3 (100.9)	34.2 (93.6)	33.4 (92.1)	33.4 (92.1)	32.8 (91.0)	29.0 (84.2)	23.6 (74.5)	31.9 (89.4)
Daily mean °C (°F)	14.6 (58.3)	18.6 (65.5)	23.8 (74.8)	29.6 (85.3)	32.4 (90.3)	32.5 (90.5)	30.1 (86.2)	29.5 (85.1)	28.9 (84.0)	26.2 (79.2)	21.2 (70.2)	16.3 (61.3)	25.3 (77.6)
Mean daily minimum °C (°F)	7.8 (46.0)	11.0 (51.8)	15.4 (59.7)	21.0 (69.8)	24.8 (76.6)	26.7 (80.1)	26.0 (78.8)	25.6 (78.1)	24.4 (75.9)	19.5 (67.1)	13.3 (55.9)	8.9 (48.0)	18.7 (65.7)
Record low °C (°F)	−1.0 (30.2)	0.0 (32.0)	5.4 (41.7)	10.9 (51.6)	17.0 (62.6)	19.2 (66.6)	21.5 (70.7)	21.2 (70.2)	17.2 (63.0)	10.0 (50.0)	3.9 (39.0)	0.5 (32.9)	−1.0 (30.2)
Average rainfall mm (inches)	21.6 (0.85)	14.0 (0.55)	11.0 (0.43)	5.5 (0.22)	24.5 (0.96)	107.4 (4.23)	238.5 (9.39)	241.6 (9.51)	162.1 (6.38)	27.9 (1.10)	2.5 (0.10)	4.7 (0.19)	861.4 (33.91)
Average rainy days	1.7	1.4	1.1	0.7	2.0	5.1	11.8	10.6	7.2	1.4	0.4	0.5	43.8
Average relative humidity (%) (at 17:30 IST)	61	49	35	26	32	49	73	77	73	62	59	63	55
Average dew point °C (°F)	9 (48)	12 (54)	13 (55)	14 (57)	19 (66)	23 (73)	26 (79)	26 (79)	25 (77)	19 (66)	14 (57)	10 (50)	18 (63)
Average ultraviolet index	5	7	9	11	12	12	12	12	10	8	6	5	9
Source 1: India Meteorological Department Time and Date (dewpoints, 2005-2015)
Source 2: Weather Atlas, Tokyo Climate Center (mean temperatures 1991–2020)

== Flora and fauna ==
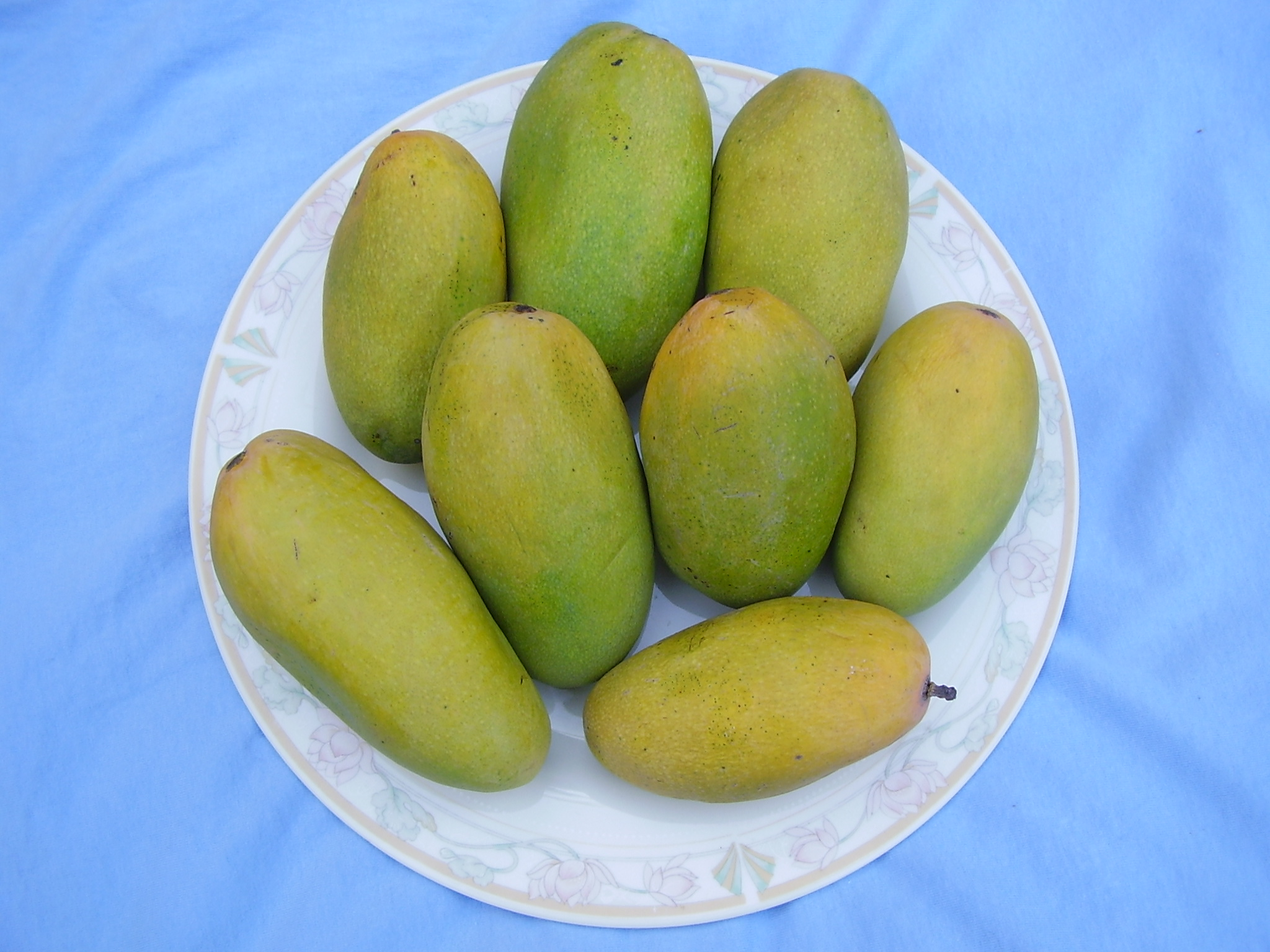
Lucknow is known for its Dasheri mangoes, which are exported to many countries.

Lucknow has a total of 5.66 per cent of forest cover, the state average being around 7 per cent. Native tree species are: shisham, dhak, mahuamm, babul, neem, peepal, ashok, khajur, mango and gular.

Several varieties of mangoes, especially Dasheri, are grown in the Malihabad adjacent to the city and a block of the Lucknow district for export. The main crops are wheat, paddy, sugarcane, mustard, potatoes, and vegetables such as cauliflower, cabbage, tomato and brinjal. Similarly, sunflowers, roses, and marigolds are cultivated over a fairly extensive area. Many medicinal and herbal plants are grown, while common Indian monkeys are found in patches in and around city forests such as Musa Bagh.

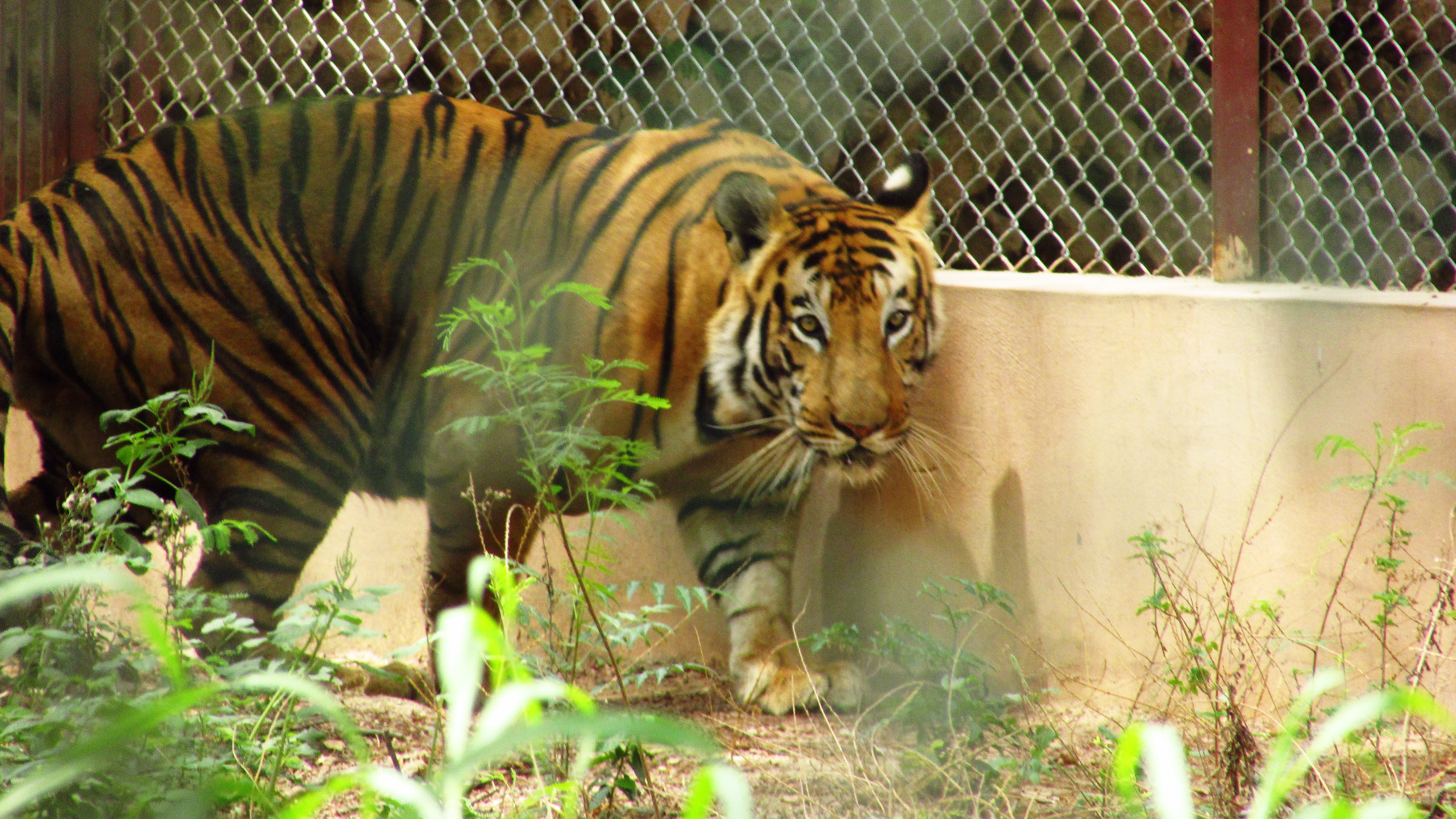
Bengal Tiger at the Lucknow Zoo

Established in 1921, the Lucknow Zoo is one of the oldest in the country. It houses a rich collection of animals from Asia, and other continents. The zoo also has enjoyable toy train rides for visitors. The city has a botanical garden, which is a zone of wide botanical diversity. It is home to the Uttar Pradesh State Museum, which is the oldest and largest museum in the state, has sculptural masterpieces dating back to the 3rd century AD, including intricately carved Mathura sculptures ranging from dancing girls to scenes from the life of Buddha. It is also one of the only six Indian museums to house an Egyptian Mummy, the others being in Kolkata, Hyderabad, Mumbai, Jaipur and Vadodara.

== Economy ==
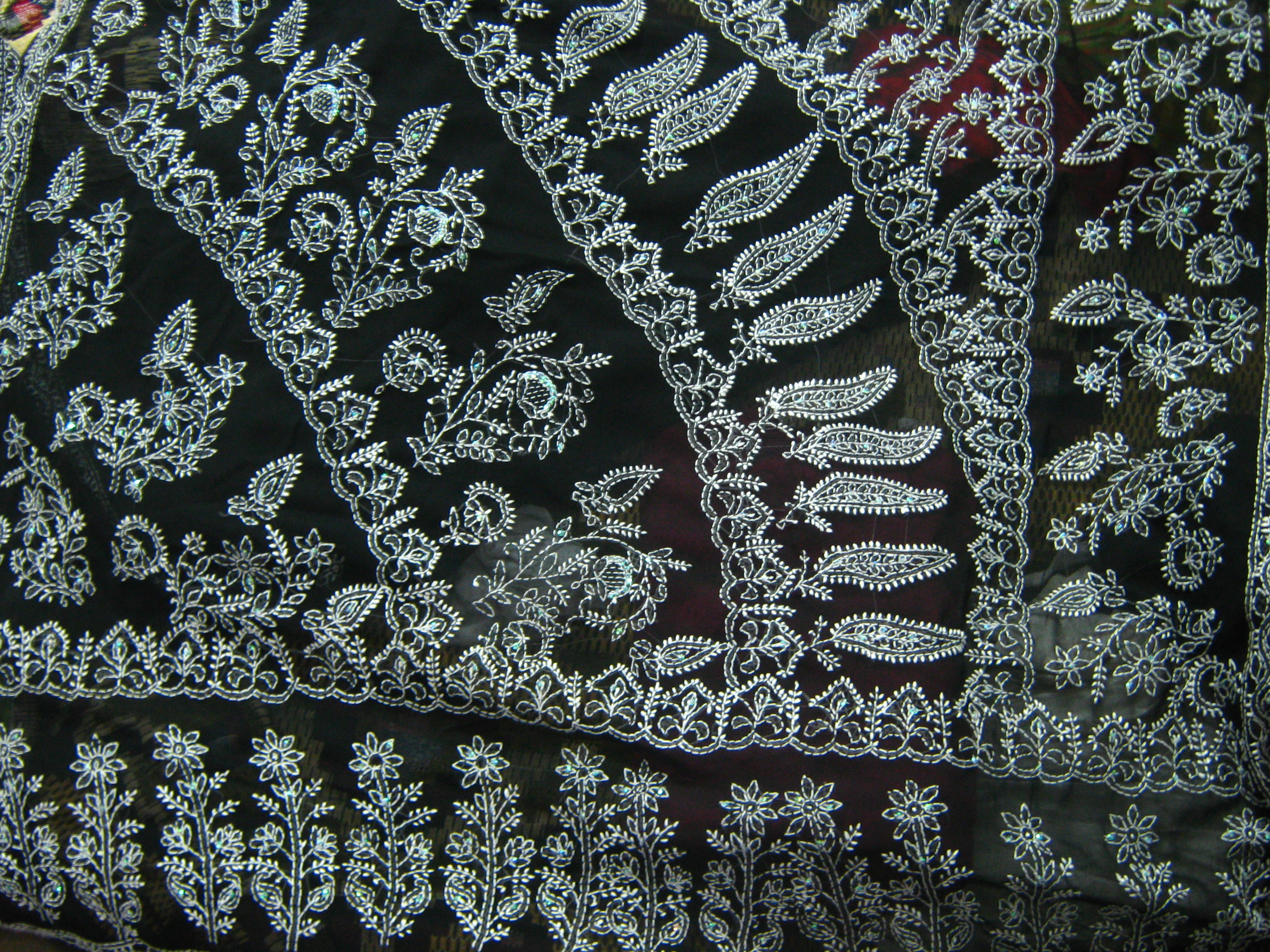
Traditional Chikan Embroidery

The major industries in the Lucknow urban agglomeration include aeronautics, automotive, machine tools, distillery chemicals, furniture and Chikan embroidery. Lucknow is among the top cities of India by GDP. It is a centre for research and development as home to the R&D centres of the National Milk Grid of the National Dairy Development Board, the Central Institute of Medical and Aromatic Plants, the National Handloom Development Corporation and U.P. Export Corporation. Lucknow is ranked sixth in a list of the ten fastest growing job-creating cities in India according to a study conducted by Assocham Placement Pattern, Lucknow's economy was formerly based on the tertiary sector and the majority of the workforce were employed as government servants. Large-scale industrial establishments are few compared to other northern Indian state capitals like New Delhi. The economy is growing with contributions from the fields of IT, manufacturing and processing and medical/biotechnology. Business-promoting institutions such as the CII have set up their service centres in the city. Major export items are marbled products, handicrafts, art pieces, gems, jewellery, textiles, electronics, software products, computers, hardware products, apparel, brass products, silk, leather goods, glass items and chemicals. Lucknow has promoted public-private partnerships in sectors such as electricity supply, roads, expressways, and educational ventures.

Lucknow in recent times have lagged in growth and only ranks 7th in per capita income in the state of Uttar Pradesh, despite being the capital. Cities like Noida, Ghaziabad and Meerut have dominated in terms of industrial growth and attracting IT jobs and opportunities. Noida ranks highest, followed by Meerut in per capita income in the state.

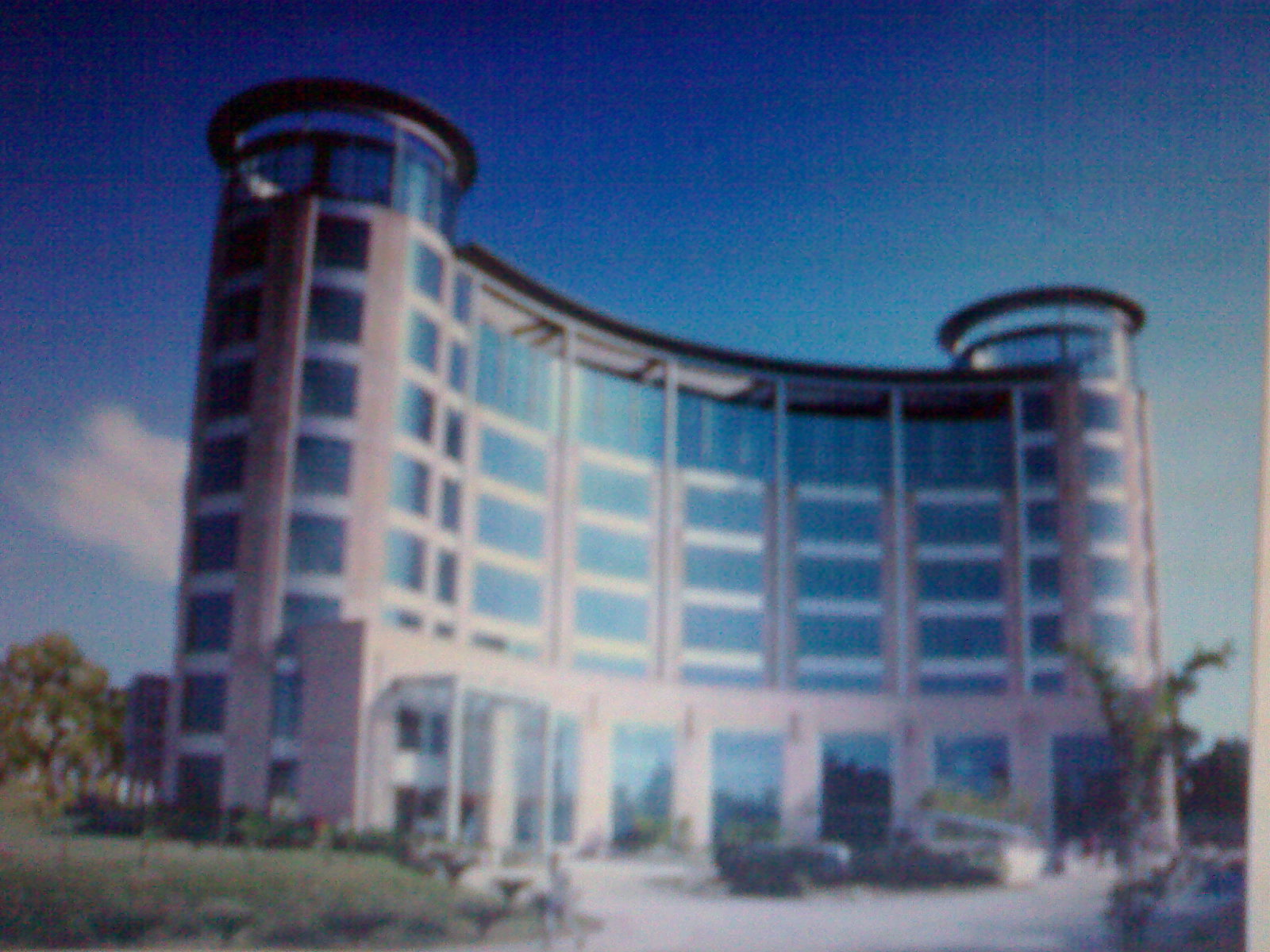
Lucknow campus of the TCS

Multiple software and IT companies are present in the city. Tata Consultancy Services, HCL Technologies, Deloitte, IBM, Genpact and Teleperformance are present in the city. IT companies are located in Gomtinagar. While it still lags behind cities like Noida, Greater Noida and Meerut in IT hubs. The city is also home to a number of important national and state level headquarters for companies including Sony Corporation and Reliance Retail. The handicrafts sector accounts for 60 per cent of total exports from the state.

Companies such as Hindustan Aeronautics Limited, KARAM, Berger Paints, Britannia Industries, Exide Industries, Tata Motors, Ashok Leyland have set up their plants in Lucknow. Tata Motors has a plant primarily for light commercial vehicles. It was set up in 1992 and has a production capacity of 640 vehicles per day. There is also a Tata Marcopolo factory in the city.

To promote the textile industry in the city, the Indian government has allocated Rs. 2 billion (2000 million rupees) to set up a textile business cluster in the city. A sprawling 40 hectares (0.40 km^{2}; 100 acres) IT city costing 15 billion Rupees is planned by the state government at the Chak Ganjaria farms site on the road to Sultanpur and they have already approved special economic zone status for the project, which is expected to create thousands of job opportunities in the state. A defence industrial corridor is also coming in the city.

Traditionally, Lucknow has been a mandi town for mangoes, melons, and grains grown in the surrounding areas. Sugarcane-growing plantations and sugar industries are also in close proximity. This attracted Edward Dyer to set up a unit based on molasses in the city. Dyer Breweries was incorporated in 1855 and was Asia's first commercial brewery. The company name was changed to Mohan Meakin Brewery in 1967 (the word "Breweries" was dropped in the eighties as the company diversified into other industries).

- Lucknow is famous for its small scale industries that are based on unique styles of embroidery, namely, Chikan and Lakhnawi Zardozi, both of which are significant foreign exchange earners. Chikan has caught the fancy of fashion designers in Bollywood and abroad. It is very popular in Indian markets and have very high demand.
- During the period of the Nawabs, kite-making reached a high level of artistry, and is still a small-scale industry.

The Ministry of Communications and Information Technology set up Software Technology Parks of India (STPI) in 2001. Currently, biotechnology and information technology are the two focus areas to promote economic development in and around the city. The Ministry of Science and Technology has set up a biotech park in the city. Lucknow is also one of the selected cities for the Smart City project of STPI.

The city is being developed on the lines of Delhi's National Capital Region and will be the headquarters of the Uttar Pradesh State Capital Region or Lucknow State Capital Region. It will be developed as the country's first AI City and the largest IT hub in the country. It ranks 7th in the state as per GDP per capita. Lucknow also houses a brand new BrahMos Missile manufacturing unit along with the establishment of two Defence Research and Development Organisation (DRDO) centres. Lucknow region is emerging as a key industrial and logistics hub in North India after Delhi-NCR as the warehousing sector.

== Administration ==
=== General administration ===
The Lucknow division consists of six districts, and is headed by the Divisional Commissioner of Lucknow, who is an IAS officer of high seniority. The Commissioner is the head of local government institutions (including municipal corporations) in the division, is in charge of infrastructure development in his division, and is also responsible for maintaining law and order in the division. The District Magistrate of Lucknow reports to the divisional commissioner. The current commissioner is Mukesh Meshram.

Lucknow district administration is headed by the District Magistrate of Lucknow, who is an IAS officer. The DM is in charge of property records and revenue collection for the central government and oversees the elections held in the city. The district has five tehsils, viz. Sadar, Mohanlalganj, Bakshi ka Talab, Malihabad and Sarojini Nagar, each headed by a Sub-Divisional Magistrate. The current DM is Vishak G. The district magistrate is assisted by a Chief Development Officer (CDO), eight Additional District Magistrates (ADM) (Finance/Revenue, East, West Trans-Gomti, Executive, Land Acquisition-I, Land Acquisition-II, Civil Supply), one City Magistrate (CM) and seven Additional City Magistrates (ACM).

=== Civic administration ===
The Lucknow Municipal Corporation oversees civic activities in the city. The city's first municipal body dates from 1862 when the municipal board was established. The first Indian mayor, Syed Nabiullah, was elected in 1917 after the enforcement of the UP Municipalities Act, 1916. In 1948, the Uttar Pradesh government changed the system from an electoral one to an administrator-run one and Bhairav Datt Sanwal became the administrator. In 1959, the UP Municipalities Act, 1916 was replaced with Uttar Pradesh Municipal Corporation Act, 1959 and Lucknow Municipal Corporation was established in 1960 with Raj Kumar Shrivastava becoming the mayor.

The head of the corporation is the mayor, but the executive and administration of the corporation are the responsibility of the municipal commissioner, who is an Uttar Pradesh government-appointed Indian Administrative Services (IAS) officer of high seniority. The last municipal election took place in 2023 when Sushma Kharakwal from Bharatiya Janata Party became the second consecutive female mayor of Lucknow. Bharatiya Janata Party won 80 corporator seats, Samajwadi Party won 21 seats Ajay Kumar Dwivedi, an IAS officer, is the present municipal commissioner since 17 August 2020. The Uttar Pradesh Municipal Corporation Act, 1959 gives provisions for the establishment of ward committees, but they have not been formed yet.

The sources for revenue generation for Lucknow Municipal Corporation include property tax, user charges for SWM, penalties, rent from municipal properties, income from water storage, water transmission, drainage and sanitation, grants, and charges for services such as birth and death certificates. There is also an executive committee (कार्यकारिणी समिति) made up of 12 elected councillors from different political parties, who decide on policy matters of the corporation.

=== Municipal finance ===
According to financial data published on the CityFinance Portal of the Ministry of Housing and Urban Affairs, the Lucknow Nagar Nigam reported total revenue receipts of ₹1,505 crore (US$181 million) and total expenditure of ₹1,457 crore (US$175 million) in 2022–23. Tax revenue accounted for about 25.3% of the total revenue, while the corporation received ₹973 crore in grants during the financial year.

=== Police administration ===
The Police Commissionerate System was introduced in Lucknow on 14 January 2020. The district police is headed by a Commissioner of Police (CP), who is an IPS officer of ADGP rank and is assisted by two Joint Commissioners of Police (IG rank), and five Deputy Commissioners of Police (SP rank). Lucknow is divided into five zones, each headed by a Deputy Commissioner of Police. Of the two Joint Commissioners, one looks after law and order, the other crime. The current police commissioner of Lucknow City is IPS SB Shirodkar.

The district police observes the citizenry through high-technology control rooms and all important streets and intersections are under surveillance with the help of CCTVs and drone cameras. Crowd-control is carried out with the help of pepper-spraying drones. There are more than 10,000 CCTV cameras deployed by the Lucknow Police Department across the city roads and trijunctions, making Lucknow the first city in the country to do so.

The Lucknow Modern Police Control Room (abbreviated as MCR) is India's biggest 'Dial 112' service centre with 300 communication officers to receive distress calls from all over the state and 200 dispatch officers to rush for police help. It is billed as the India's most hi-tech police control room. Lucknow is also the centre for 1090 Women Power line, a call centre based service directed at dealing with eve-teasing. An Integrated 'Dial 112' Control Room building is also there which is having the world's biggest modern Police Emergency Response System (PERS).

== Judicial institutions ==
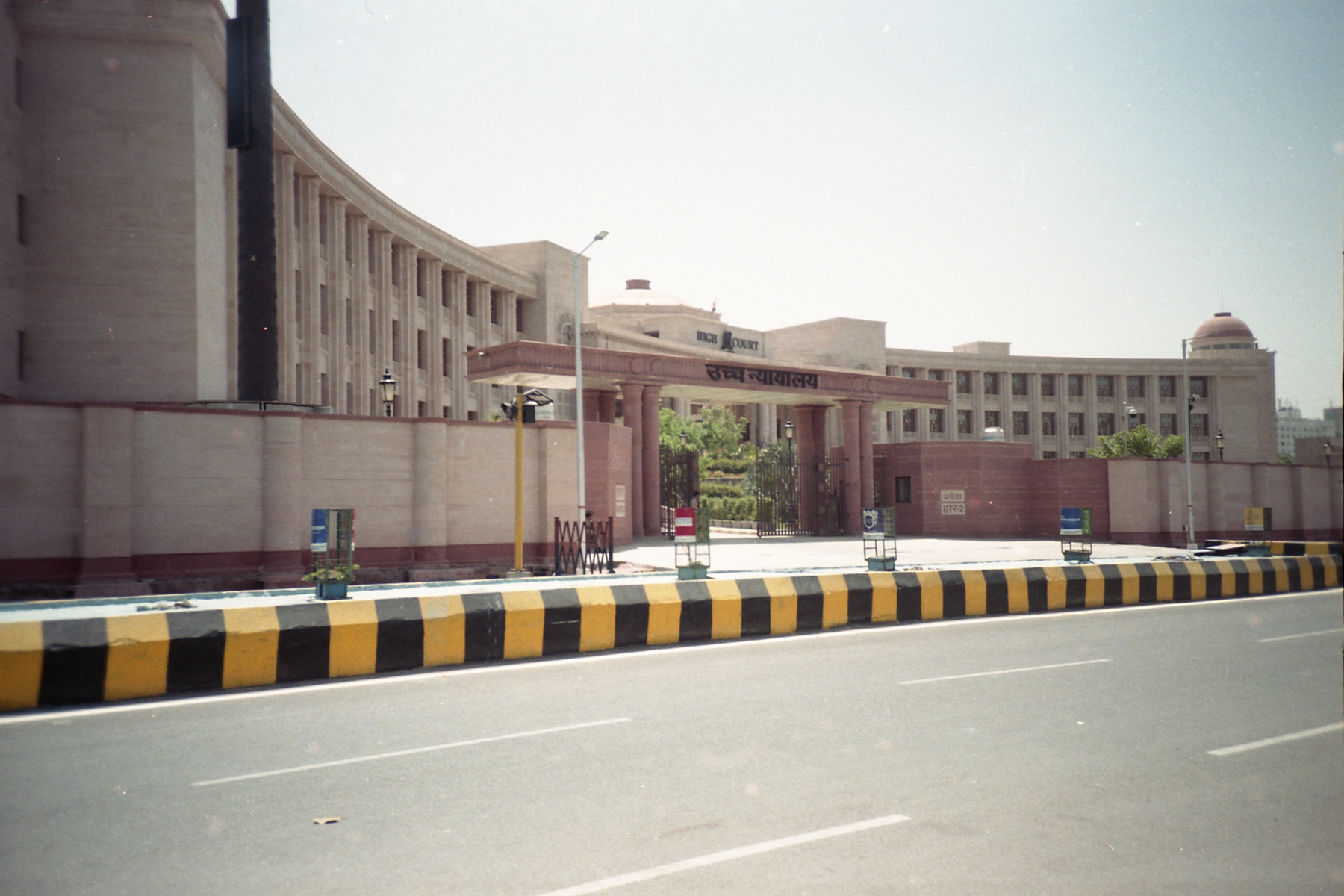
Lucknow Bench of the Allahabad High Court.

There is a bench of the Allahabad High Court in Lucknow. Aside from this, Lucknow has a District & Sessions Court, five CBI Courts, one family court and two railway courts. The High Court Bench as well as the District & Sessions Court and the CBI courts are located in Qaiser Bagh, and the railway courts are in Charbagh.

People have often criticised various governments for being judicial focussed on central UP. Where western Uttar Pradesh is the economic centre and has long demanded the setting up of another high court bench in west Uttar Pradesh.

Almost 54% of all cases reaching the High Court originate from the 22 districts of Western UP. Still, western Uttar Pradesh does not have a High Court. People have to travel 700 km away to Allahabad for hearings. In fact 6 high courts (Shimla, Delhi, Jaipur, Chandigarh, Nainital, Jammu) from other states are closer than Allahabad from western Uttar Pradesh.

Western Uttar Pradesh has been advocating to have a high court bench in Meerut so that Western Uttar Pradesh can get justice. This is important as west UP accounts for 51.71% of the state GDP.

== Central government offices ==
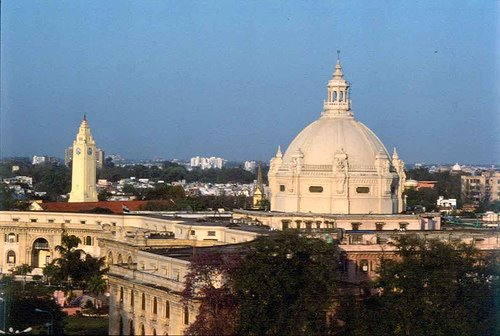
Vidhan Bavan at VS Marg, seat of both houses of the Uttar Pradesh Legislature

Since 1 May 1963, Lucknow has been the headquarters of the Central Command of the Indian Army, before which it was the headquarters of Eastern Command.

Lucknow also houses a branch office of National Investigation Agency which is responsible for combating terrorist activities in India. It oversees five states of Bihar, Madhya Pradesh, Uttarakhand, Jharkhand and Chhattisgarh for Naxal and terrorist activities.

The Commission of Railway Safety of India, under the Ministry of Civil Aviation, formerly had its head office in the Northeast Railway Compound in Lucknow.

=== Infrastructure ===
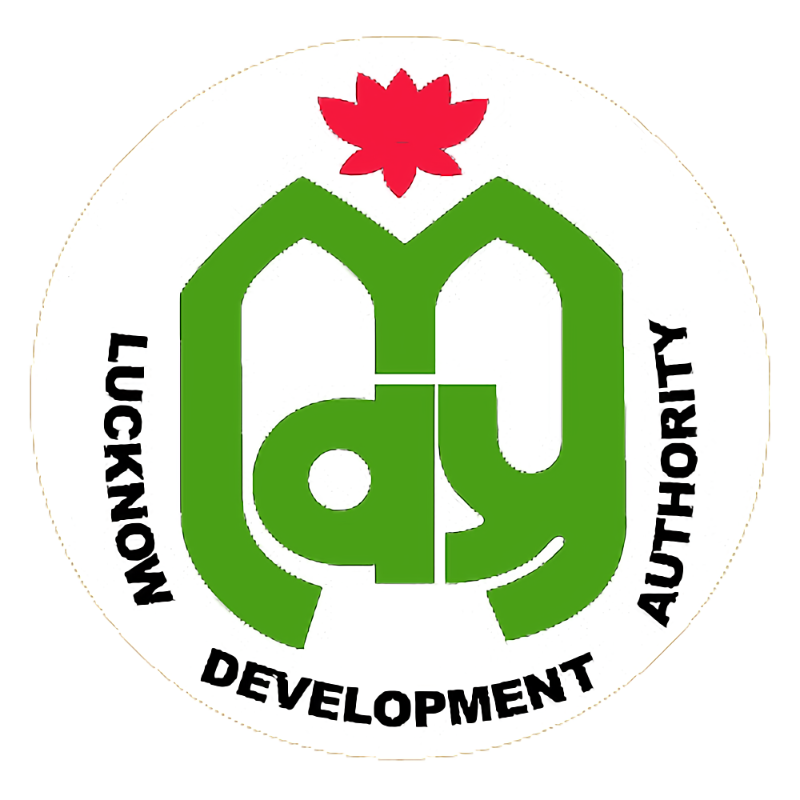
Seal of Lucknow Development Authority

The development of infrastructure in the city is overseen by Lucknow Development Authority (LDA), which comes under the Housing Department of Uttar Pradesh government. The Divisional Commissioner of Lucknow acts as the ex-officio chairman of LDA, whereas a vice-chairman, a government-appointed IAS officer, looks after the daily matters of the authority. The current vice-chairman of the Lucknow Development Authority is IAS Akshay Tripathi. LDA prepared the Lucknow master plan 2031.

=== Politics ===
As the seat of the government of Uttar Pradesh, Lucknow is the site of the Uttar Pradesh Vidhan Sabha, a bench of the Allahabad High Court and numerous government departments and agencies. Rajnath Singh, the Union Defense Minister, from Bharatiya Janata Party is the Member of Parliament from Lucknow Lok Sabha Constituency. Kaushal Kishore is the Member of Parliament from Mohanlalganj (Lok Sabha constituency), the second Lok Sabha constituency in Lucknow. Apart from the Lok Sabha Constituency, there are nine Vidhan Sabha Constituencies within Lucknow city:

Vidhan Sabha constituencies in Lucknow
Constituency	MLA	Political party
Lucknow West	Armaan Khan	Samajwadi Party
Lucknow North	Dr. Neeraj Bora	Bharatiya Janata Party
Lucknow East	Asutosh Tandon (Gopal Ji)	Bharatiya Janata Party
Lucknow Central	Ravidas Mehotra	Samajwadi Party
Lucknow Cantt	Brajesh Pathak	Bharatiya Janata Party
Malihabad	Jai Devi	Bharatiya Janata Party
Bakhshi Ka Talab	Yogesh Shukla	Bharatiya Janata Party
Sarojni Nagar	Rajeshwar Singh	Bharatiya Janata Party
Mohanlal Ganj	Amresh Kumar	Bharatiya Janata Party

== Public utilities ==
Madhyanchal Power Distribution Corporation Limited, also known as Madhyanchal Vidyut Vitaran Nigam, is responsible for supplying electricity in Lucknow. It is under the Uttar Pradesh Power Corporation Ltd. Fire safety services are provided by the Uttar Pradesh Fire Service, which is under the state government. Jal Nigam is responsible for developing and maintaining the infrastructure for water supply, sewer lines, and storm water drains. Jal Sansthan is responsible for supplying water and providing water and sewer connections. Lucknow Municipal Corporation is responsible for the solid waste management of Lucknow.

== Transport ==
=== Roads ===
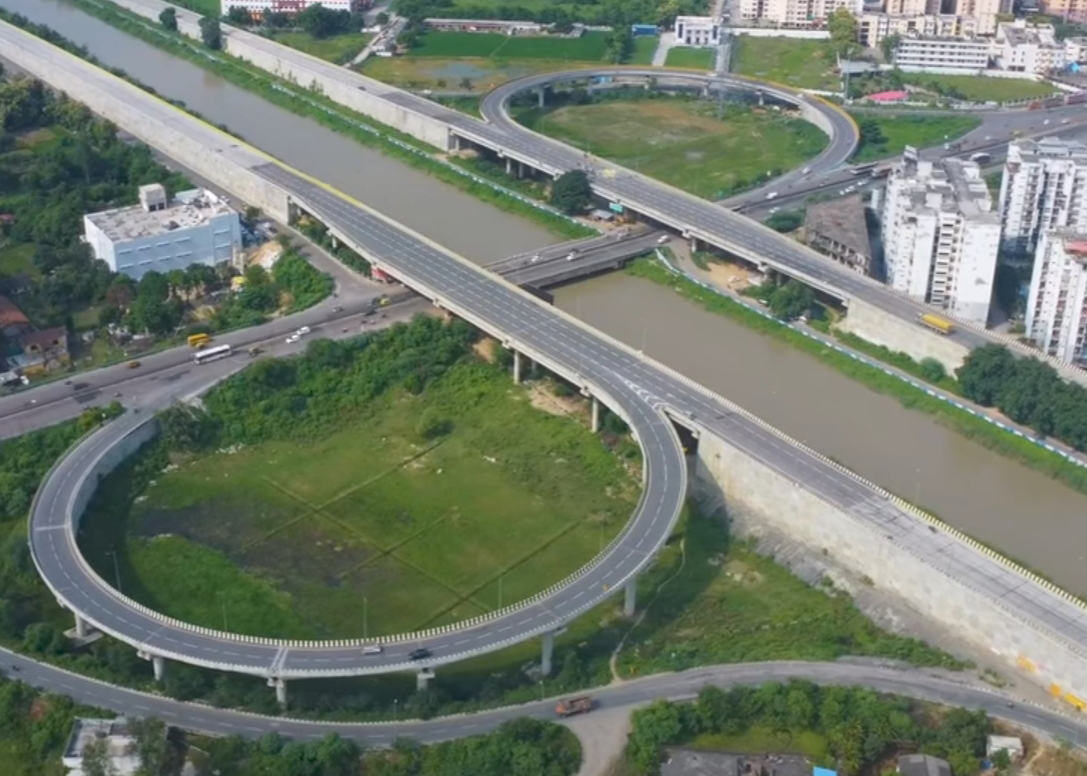
Cloverleaf Interchange at Lucknow Outer Ring Road

Two major Indian National Highways have their intersection at Lucknow's Hazratganj intersection: NH-30 to Shahjahanpur Via Sitapur in north and NH-30 to south Allahabad via Raebareli, NH-27 to Kanpur and Porbandar via Jhansi and Silchar via Gorakhpur. Multiple modes of public transport are available such as metro rail, taxis, city buses, cycle rickshaws, auto rickshaws and compressed natural gas (CNG) low-floor buses with and without air-conditioning. In recent times, air-conditioned electric buses have also been introduced. CNG was introduced as an auto fuel to keep air pollution under control. Radio Taxis are operated by several major companies like Ola, Uber, Rapido and Bharat Taxi.

The Lucknow Outer Ring Road is a 104 km long, 8-lane highway project designed to improve traffic flow and connectivity in and around Lucknow, and facilitate faster travel to neighbouring districts. The road connects to several national and state highways, including Sultanpur Road, Rae Bareli Road, Hardoi Road, Kanpur Road, Ayodhya Road, and Sitapur Road.

=== Bus ===
==== City buses ====
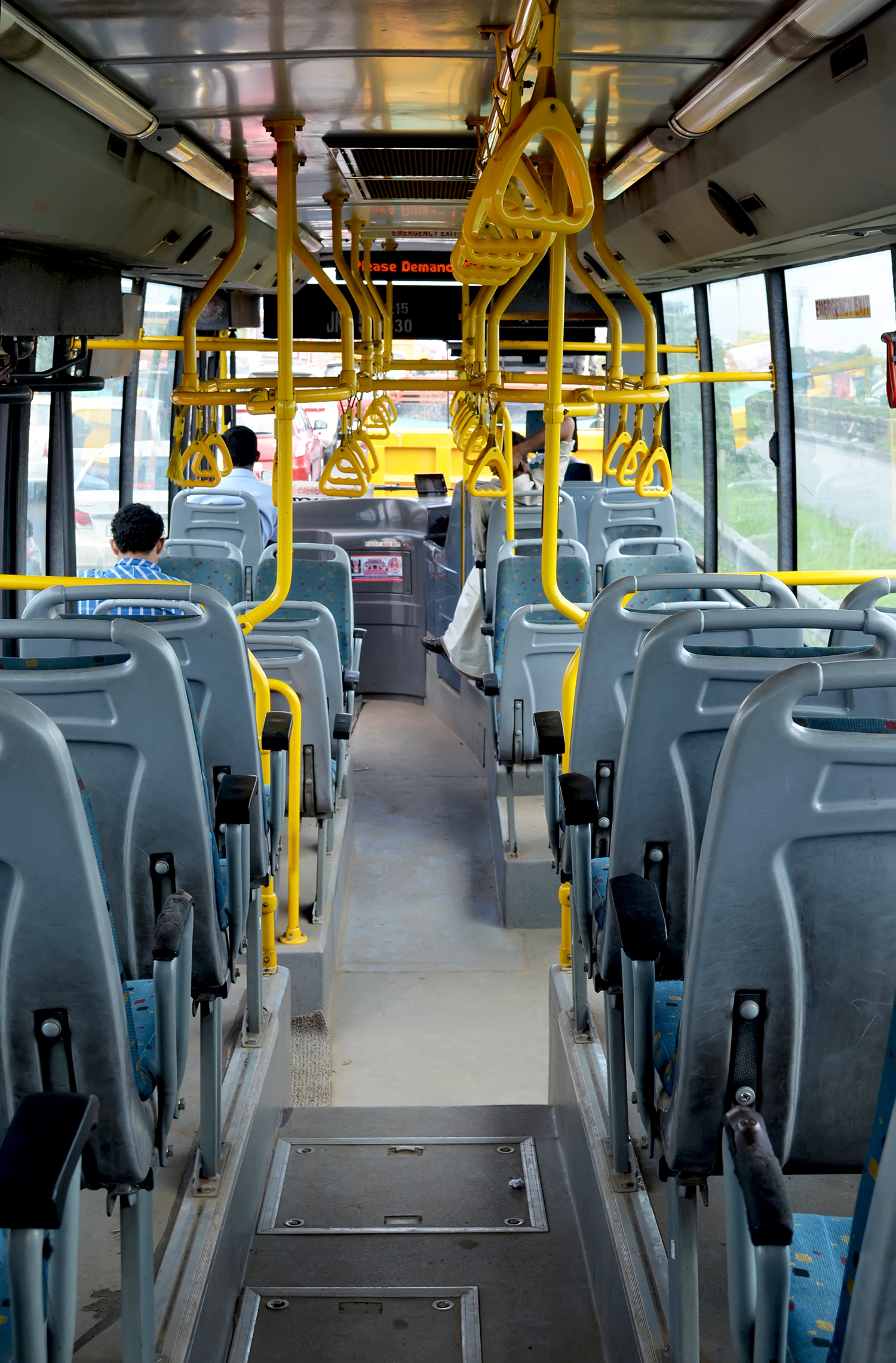
Buses of Lucknow Mahanagar Parivahan Sewa

Lucknow city's bus service is operated by Lucknow City Transport Services Limited (LCTSL), a public sector passenger road transport corporation headquartered in Triloki Nath Margh. It has 260 buses operating in the city. There are around 35 routes in the city. Terminals for city buses are located in Gudamba, Viraj Khand, Alambagh, Scooter India, Institute of Engineering and Technology, Babu Banarasi Das University, Safedabad, Pasi qila, Charbagh, Andhe Ki Chowki, Jankipuram, Gomti Nagar Railway Station, Budheshwar Intersection, Faizabad Road and Qaiserbagh. There are four bus depots in Gomti Nagar, Charbagh, Amausi, and Dubagga.

==== Inter-state buses ====
The major Dr. Bhimrao Ambedkar Inter-state Bus Terminal (ISBT) in Alambagh provides the main inter and intrastate bus lines in Lucknow. Located on National Highway 25, it provides adequate services to ongoing and incoming customers. There is a smaller bus station at Qaiserbagh. The bus terminal formally operated at Charbagh, in front of the main railway station, has now been re-established as a city bus depot. This decision was taken by the state government and UPSRTC to decongest traffic in the railway station area. A third smaller bus stop, Awadh Bus Stand is situated in Gomti Nagar. Kanpur Lucknow Roadways Service is a key service for daily commuters who travel back and forth to the city for business and educational purposes. Air conditioned "Royal Cruiser" buses manufactured by Volvo are operated by UPSRTC for inter state bus services. Main cities served by the UPSRTC intrastate bus service are Allahabad, Varanasi, Jaipur, Jhansi, Agra, Delhi, Gorakhpur. The cities outside Uttar Pradesh that are covered by inter-state bus services are Jaipur, New Delhi, Kota, Singrauli, Faridabad, Gurgaon, Dausa, Ajmer, Dehradun, and Haridwar.

=== Railways ===
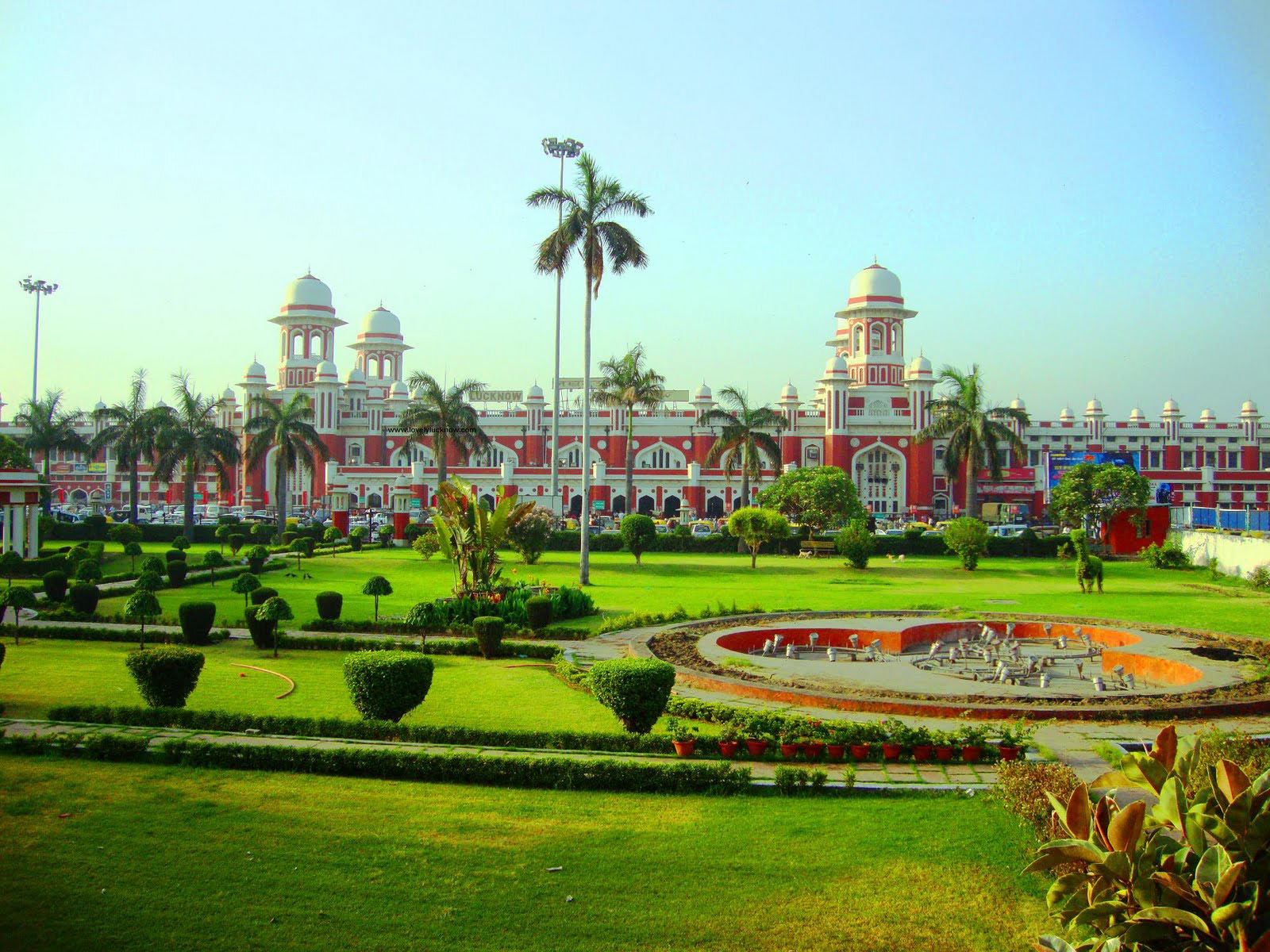
Lucknow Charbagh railway station

Lucknow is served by several railway stations in different parts of the city. The main long-distance railway station is Lucknow Railway Station located at Charbagh. It has an imposing structure built in 1923 and acts as the divisional headquarters of the Northern Railway division. Its neighbouring and second major long-distance railway station is Lucknow Junction railway station operated by the North Eastern Railway. The city is an important junction with links to all major cities of the state and country such as New Delhi, Mumbai, Hyderabad, Kolkata, Chandigarh, Nashik, Amritsar, Jammu, Kota jn., Chennai, Bangalore, Ahmedabad, Pune, Indore, Bhopal, Jhansi, Jabalpur, Jaipur, Raipur and Siwan.

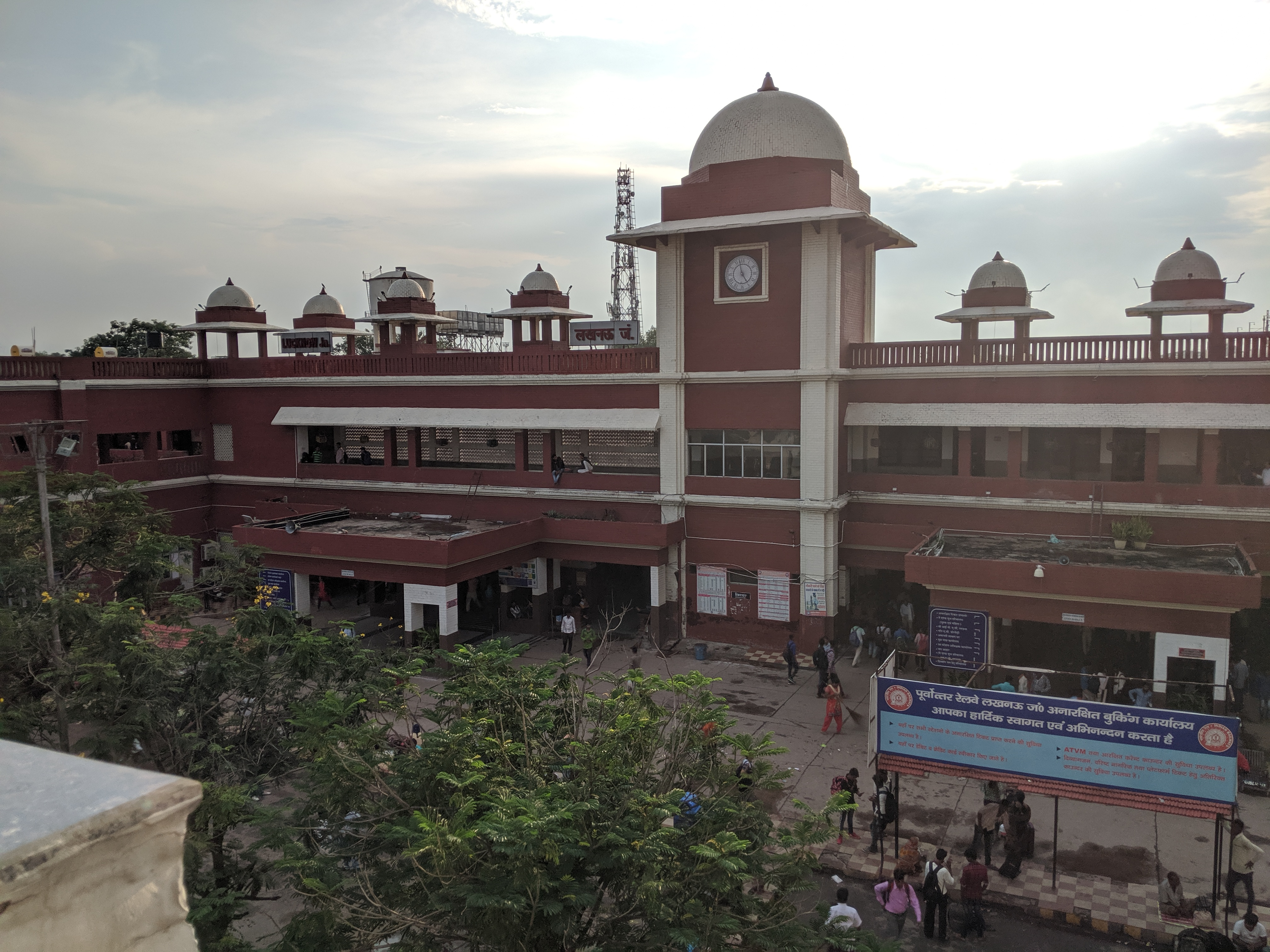
Lucknow Junction railway station

The city has a total of fourteen railway stations. Earlier the meter-gauge services originated at Aishbagh and connected to Lucknow city, Daliganj and Mohibullapur. Now all the stations have been converted to broad gauge. All stations lie within the city limits and are well interconnected by bus services and other public road transport. Suburban stations include Bakshi Ka Talab and Kakori. The Lucknow–Kanpur Suburban Railway was started in 1867 to cater for the needs of commuters travelling between Lucknow and Kanpur. Trains running on this service also stop at numerous stations at different locations in the city forming a suburban rail network.

==== Stations ====
The city is served by the following stations-

- Aishbagh Junction
- Alamnagar
- Amausi
- Badshahnagar
- Daliganj Junction
- Gomti Nagar
- Lucknow Charbagh
- Lucknow City
- Lucknow Junction
- Malhaur
- Manak Nagar
- Mohibullapur
- Transport Nagar
- Utraitia Junction

=== Air transport ===
Lucknow is served by Chaudhary Charan Singh International Airport. The airport has been ranked the second-best in the world in the small airport category. The airport is suitable for all-weather operations and provides parking facilities for up to 14 aircraft. Covering 480 hectares (4.80 km^{2}; 1,187 acres), with Terminal 1 for international flights and Terminal 2 for domestic flights, the airport can handle Boeing 767 to Boeing 747-400 aircraft allowing significant passenger and cargo traffic. International destinations include Dubai, Muscat, Sharjah, Riyadh, Bangkok, Dammam and Jeddah.

The planned expansion of the airport will allow Airbus A380 jumbo jets to land at the airport. The Nagarjuna construction company (NCC) has started the construction of the new terminal at Lucknow Airport which is expected to be completed by December 2021 to meet the growing demand. There is also a plan for runway expansion. The airport is the eleventh busiest airport in India, the busiest in Uttar Pradesh, and the second-busiest in northern India.

=== Metro ===
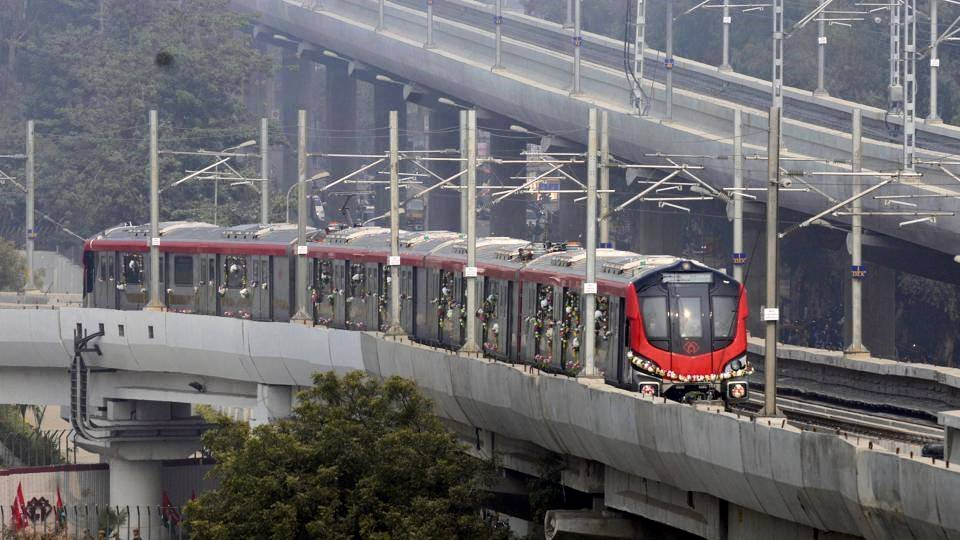
Lucknow Metro

Lucknow Metro is a rapid transit system which started its operations from 6 September 2017. Lucknow Metro system is one of the most rapidly built metro systems in the world, and the most economical high-speed rapid transit system project in India.

Lucknow has the third largest metro network in the state after Noida, Meerut and Ghaziabad.

In February, Chief Minister Akhilesh Yadav approved the setting up of a metro rail system for the state capital, and the commencement of civil works started on 27 September 2014. It is divided into two corridors, the north–south corridor connecting Munshipulia to CCS International Airport, and the east–west corridor connecting Charbagh Railway Station to Vasant Kunj. This is the most expensive public transport system in the state but provides a rapid means of mass transport to decongest traffic on city roads.

Construction of the 23 kilometre Red Line (Lucknow Metro), from Chaudhary Charan Singh International Airport to Munshi Pulia metro station (Phase 1A) was completed and inaugurated by March 2019. The Blue Line (Phase 1B) from Charbagh metro station to Vasant Kunj is currently under construction. The completion of metro rail project is the primary object of Uttar Pradesh government currently headed by the chief minister Yogi Adityanath

On 5 September 2017, Home Minister Rajnath Singh and CM Yogi Adityanath showed green flag to the Lucknow Metro.

=== Cycling ===
Lucknow is among the most bicycle-friendly cities in Uttar Pradesh. Bike-friendly tracks have been established near the chief minister's residence in the city. The four-and-a-half-kilometre (2.8 mi) track encompasses La-Martiniere College Road next to a golf club on Kalidas Marg, where the chief minister resides, and Vikramaditya Marg, which houses the office of the ruling party. The dedicated four-metre (13 ft) lane for cyclists is separate from the footpath and the main road. With Amsterdam as the inspiration, new cycle tracks are to be constructed in the city to make it more cycle-friendly, with facilities like bike rental also in the works. In the year 2015, Lucknow also hosted a national level cycling event called 'The Lucknow Cyclothon' in which professional and amateur cyclists took part. An under-construction cycle track network by the government of Uttar Pradesh is set to make Lucknow the city with India's biggest cycle network.

== Demographics ==
Historical population
Year	Pop.	±%
1865	300,000	—
1871	284,800	−5.1%
1881	261,300	−8.3%
1891	273,000	+4.5%
1901	264,000	−3.3%
1911	259,800	−1.6%
1921	240,600	−7.4%
1931	274,700	+14.2%
1941	387,177	+40.9%
1951	496,900	+28.3%
1961	595,400	+19.8%
1968	763,600	+28.2%
1971	814,000	+6.6%
1981	1,007,604	+23.8%
1991	1,669,204	+65.7%
2001	2,245,509	+34.5%
2011	2,902,601	+29.3%

Religion in Lucknow City (2011)
Religion	Percent
Hinduism	71.71%
Islam	26.36%
Sikhism	0.76%
Christianity	0.58%
Others	0.59%

The population of Lucknow Urban Agglomeration (LUA) rose above one million in 1981, while the 2001 census estimated it had risen to 2.24 million. This included about 60,000 people in the Lucknow Cantonment and 2.18 million in Lucknow city and represented an increase of 34.53% over the 1991 figure.

According to the provisional report of 2011 Census of India, Lucknow city had a population of 2,815,601, of which 1,470,133 were men and 1,345,468 women. This was an increase of 25.36% compared to the 2001 figures.

Between 1991 and 2001, the population registered growth of 32.03%, significantly lower than the 37.14% which was registered between 1981 and 1991. The initial provisional data suggests a population density of 1,815 inhabitants per square kilometre (4,700/sq mi) in 2011, compared to 1,443 in 2001. As the total area covered by the Lucknow district is only about 2,528 square kilometres (976 mi^{2}), the population density was much than the 690 inhabitants per square kilometre (1,800/sq mi) recorded at the state level. The Scheduled Caste population of the state represented 21.3% of the total population, a figure higher than the state average of 21.15%. Hindi is spoken by 88.16% of the population, while Urdu is spoken by 10.26%.

The sex ratio in Lucknow city stood at 915 females per 1000 males in 2011, compared to the 2001 census figure of 888. The average national sex ratio in India is 940 according to the Census 2011 Directorate. The city has a total literacy level in 2011 of 84.72% compared to 67.68% for Uttar Pradesh as a whole. In 2001 these same figures stood at 75.98% and 56.27%. In Lucknow city, the total literate population totalled 2,147,564 people of which 1,161,250 were male and 986,314 were female. Despite the fact that the overall work-participation rate in the district (32.24%) is higher than the state average (23.7%), the rate among females in Lucknow is very low at only 5.6% and shows a decline from the 1991 figure of 5.9%.

== Architecture ==
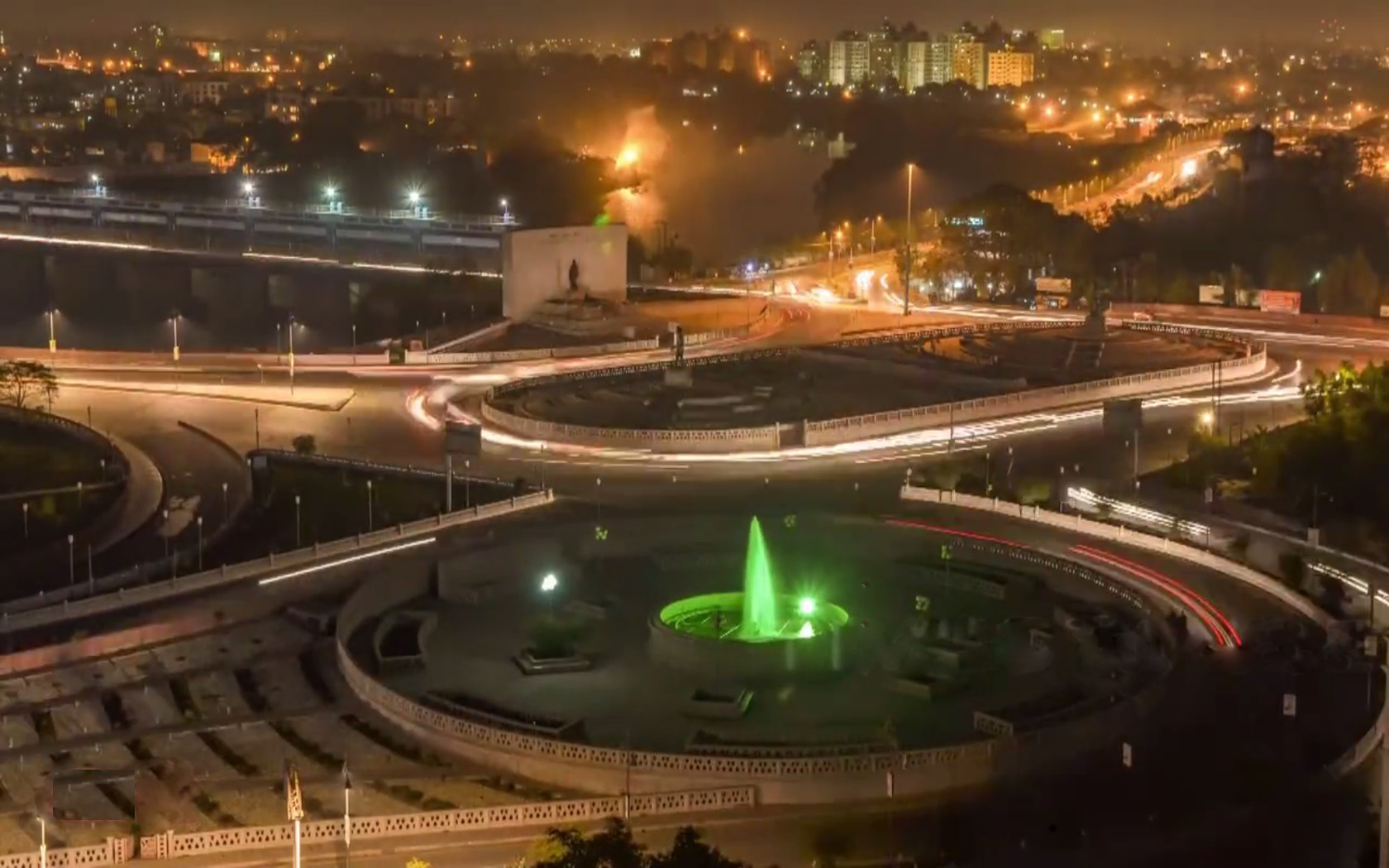
Skyline of Lucknow as seen from Gomti Nagar

Lucknow's buildings show different styles of architecture with the many iconic buildings built during the British and Mughal era. More than half of these buildings lie in the old part of the city. The Uttar Pradesh Tourism Department organises a "Heritage Walk" for tourists covering the popular monuments. Among the extant architecture, there are religious buildings such as Imambaras, mosques, and other Islamic shrines as well as secular structures such as enclosed gardens, baradaris, and palace complexes.

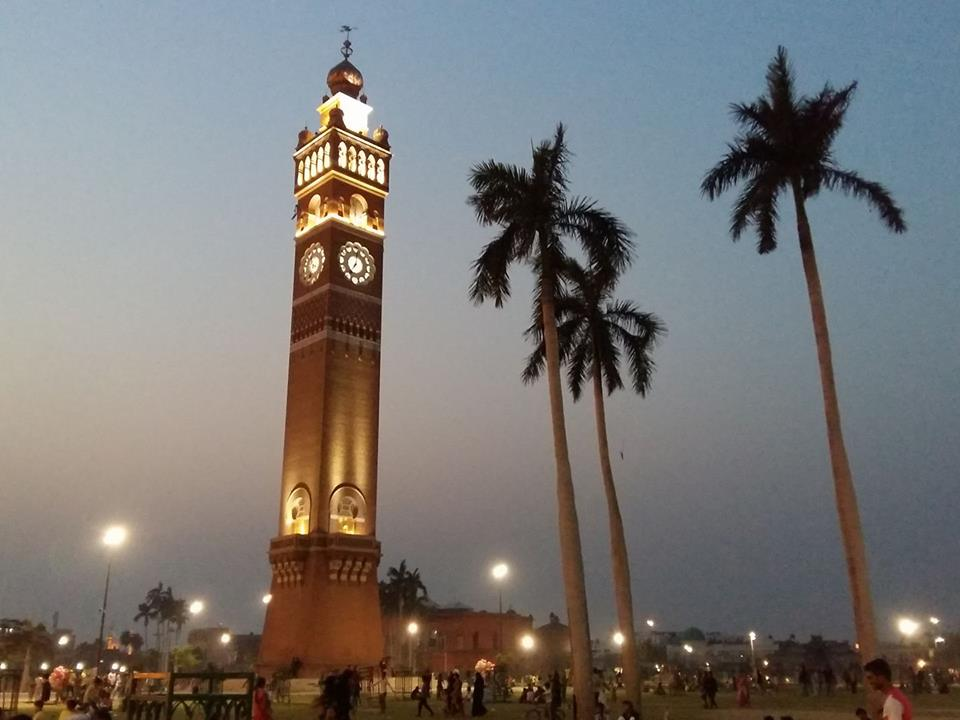
Ghanta Ghar, the tallest clock tower in India

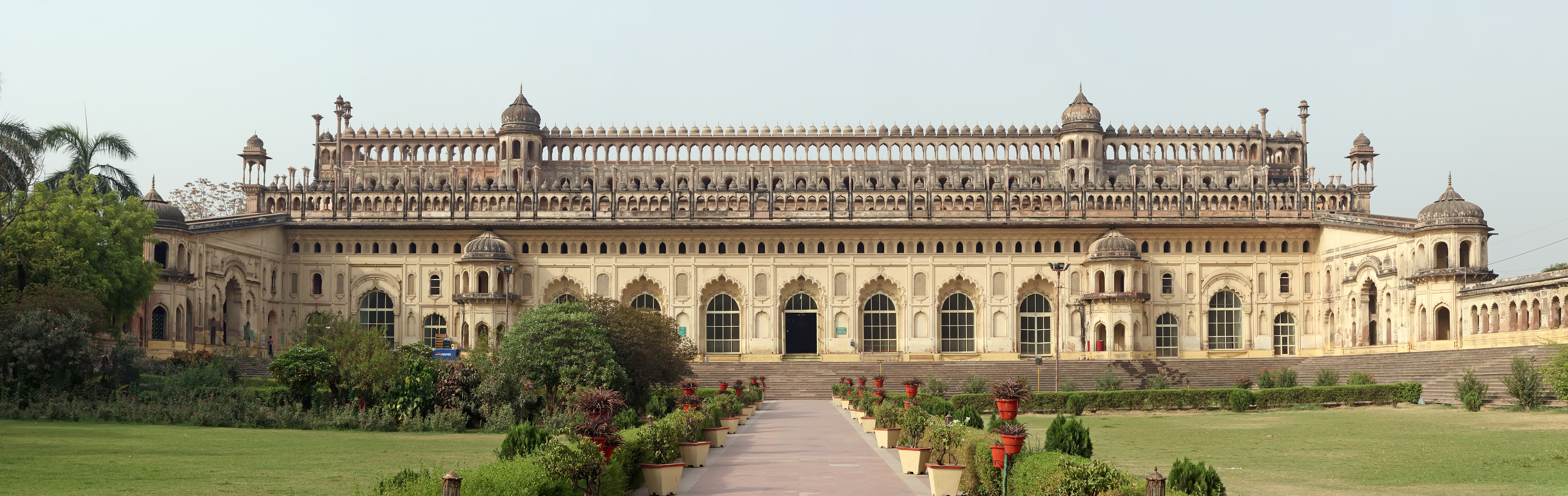
Bara Imambara

Bara Imambara in Hussainabad is a colossal edifice built in 1784 by the then Nawab of Lucknow, Asaf-ud-Daula. It was originally built to provide assistance to people affected by the deadly famine, which struck the whole of Uttar Pradesh in the same year. It is the largest hall in Asia without any external support from wood, iron or stone beams. The monument required approximately 22,000 labourers during construction.

The 18 m (60 feet) tall Rumi Darwaza, built by Nawab Asaf-ud-daula (r. 1775–1797) in 1784, served as the entrance to the city of Lucknow. It is also known as the Turkish Gateway, as it was erroneously thought to be identical to the gateway at Constantinople. The edifice provides the west entrance to the Great Imambara and is embellished with lavish decorations.

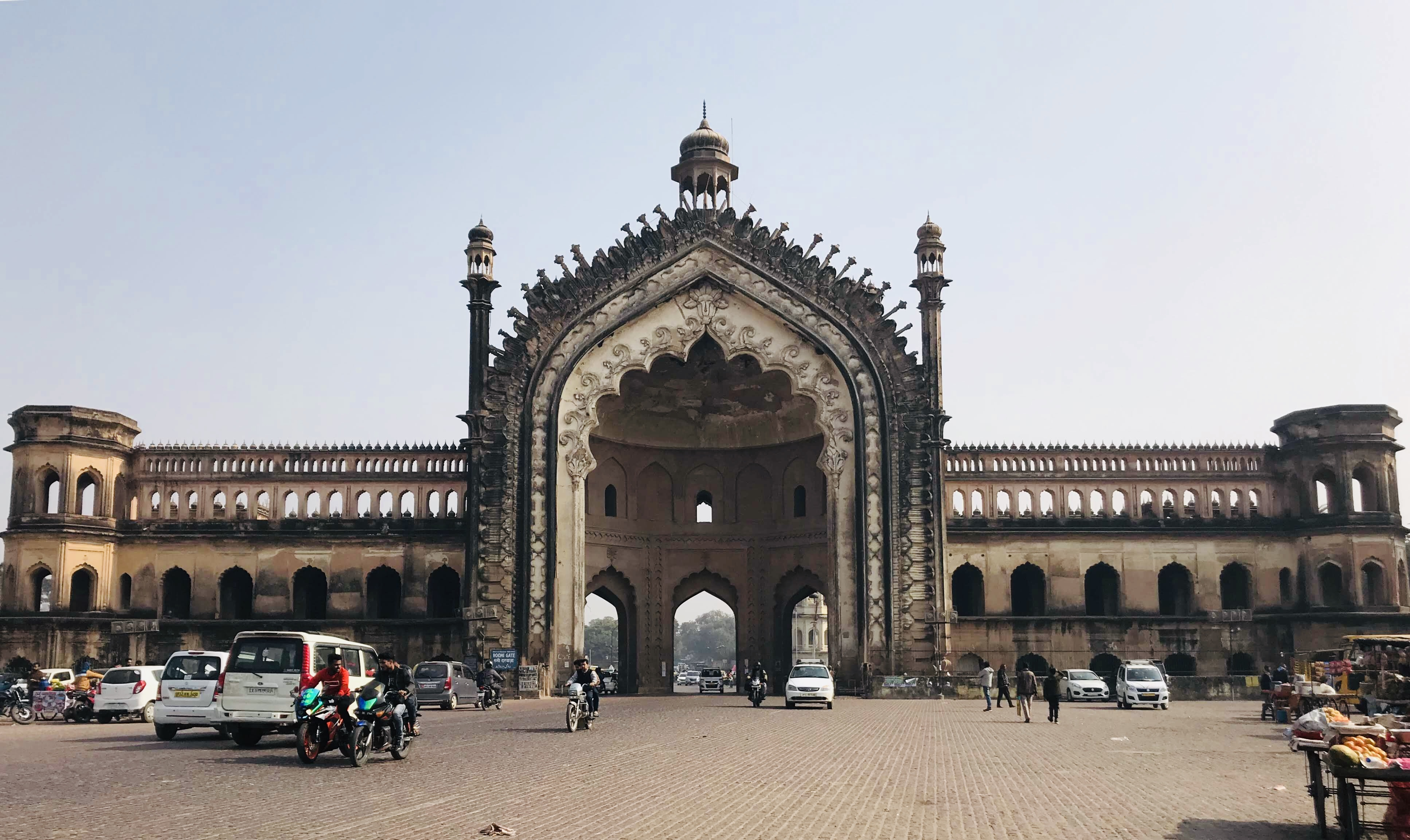
Rumi Darwaza

Various architectural styles can be seen in the historical areas of Lucknow. The University of Lucknow shows a huge inspiration from the European style while Indo-Saracenic Revival architecture is prominently present in the Uttar Pradesh Vidhan Sabha building and Charbagh Railway station. Dilkusha Kothi is the remains of a palace constructed by the British resident Major Gore Ouseley around 1800 and showcases English Baroque architecture. It served as a hunting lodge for the Nawab of Awadhs and as a summer resort.

The Chattar Manzil, which served as the palace for the rulers of Awadh and their wives is topped by an umbrella-like dome and so named on account of Chattar being the Hindi word for "umbrella". Opposite Chattar Manzil stands the 'Lal Baradari' built by Nawab Saadat Ali Khan I between 1789 and 1814. It functioned as a throne room at coronations for the royal courts. The building is now used as a museum and contains delicately executed portraits of men who played major roles in the administration of the kingdom of Oudh.

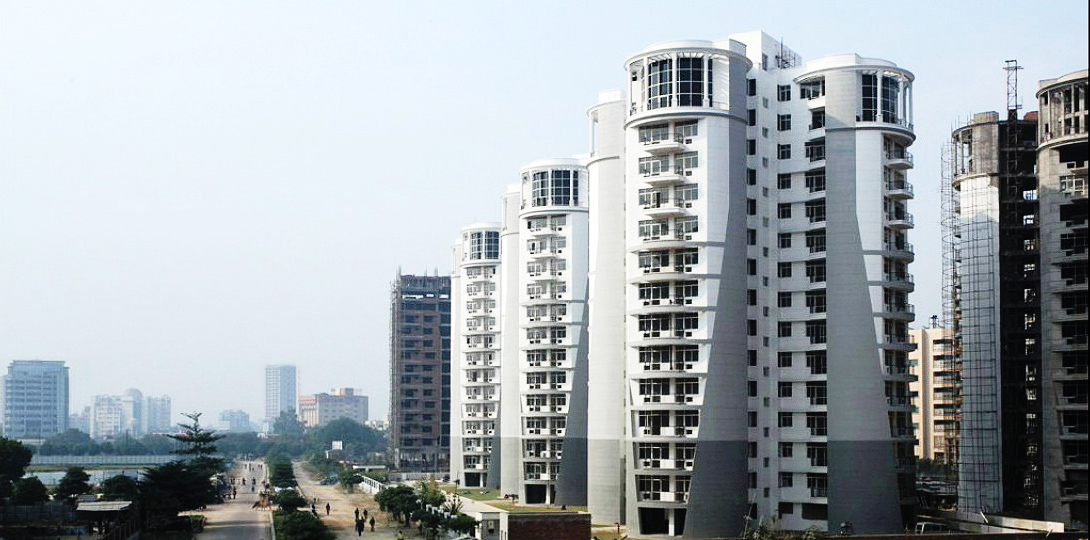
Multi-storey apartments

Another example of mixed architectural styles is La Martiniere College, which shows a fusion of Indian and European ideas. It was built by Major-General Claude Martin who was born in Lyon and died in Lucknow on 13 September 1800. Originally named "Constantia", the ceilings of the building are domed with no wooden beams used for construction. Glimpses of Gothic architecture can also be seen in the college building.

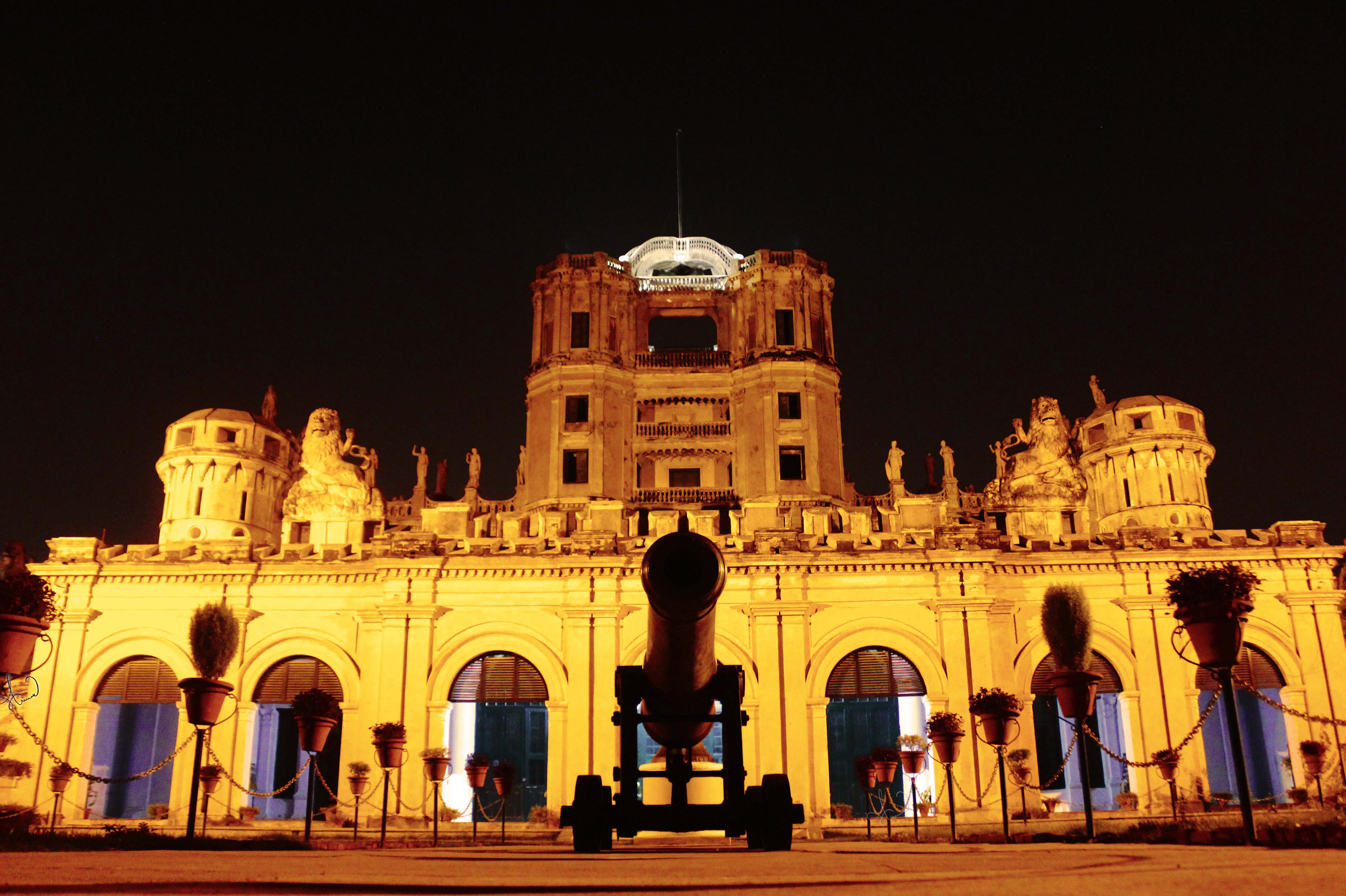
The Constantia, the main building of the La Martiniere College

Lucknow's Asafi Imambara exhibits vaulted halls as its architectural speciality. The Bara Imambara, Chhota Imambara and Rumi Darwaza stand in testament to the city's Nawabi mixture of Mughlai and Turkish styles of architecture while La Martiniere college bears witness to the Indo-European style. Even the new buildings are fashioned using characteristic domes and pillars, and at night these illuminated monuments become the city's main attractions.

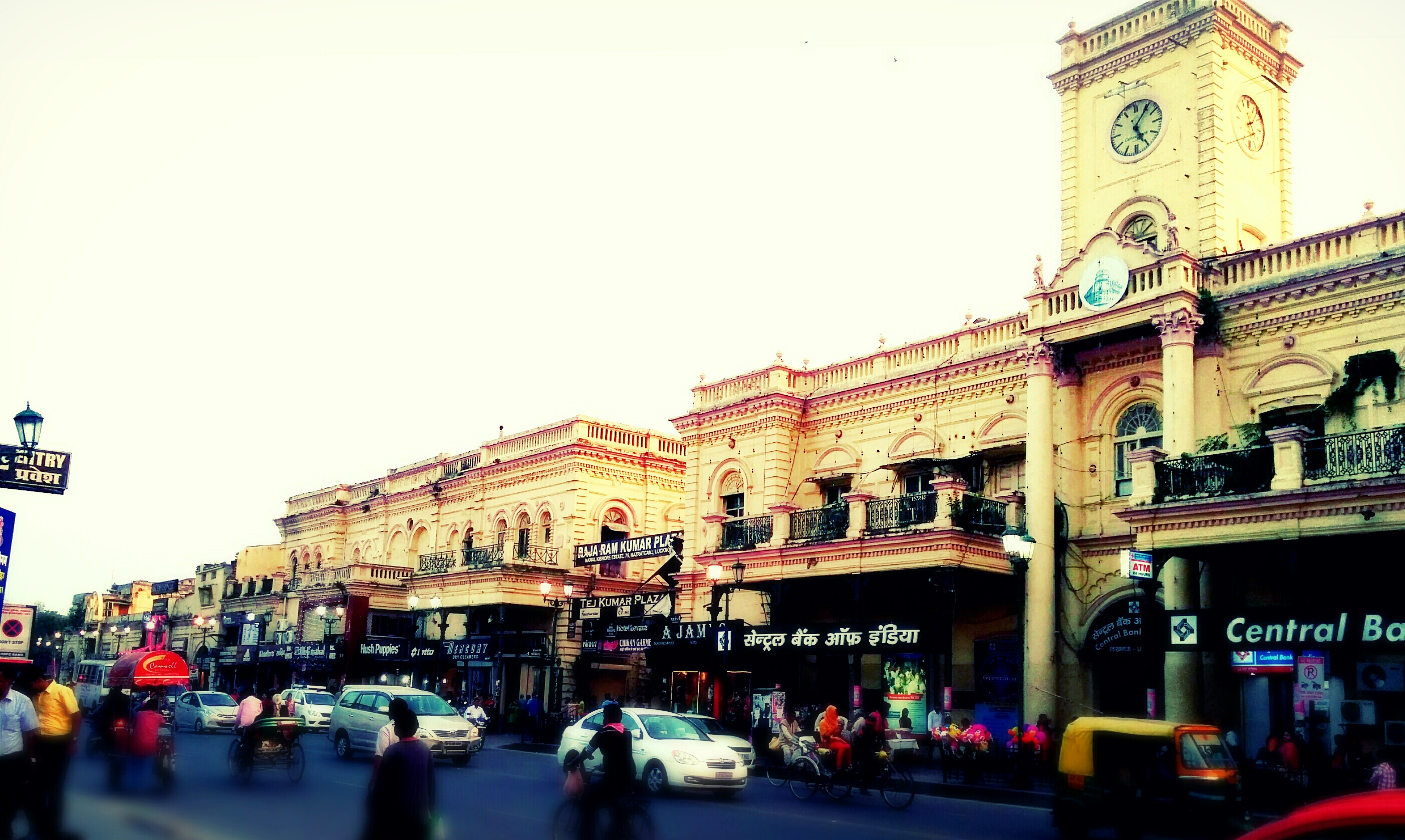
Hazratganj Market

Around Hazratganj, the city's central shopping area, there is a fusion of old and modern architecture. It has a multi-level parking lot in place of an old and dilapidated police station making way for extending the corridors into pebbled pathways, adorned with piazzas, green areas and wrought-iron and cast-iron lamp-posts, reminiscent of the Victorian era, flank both sides of the street.

== Culture ==
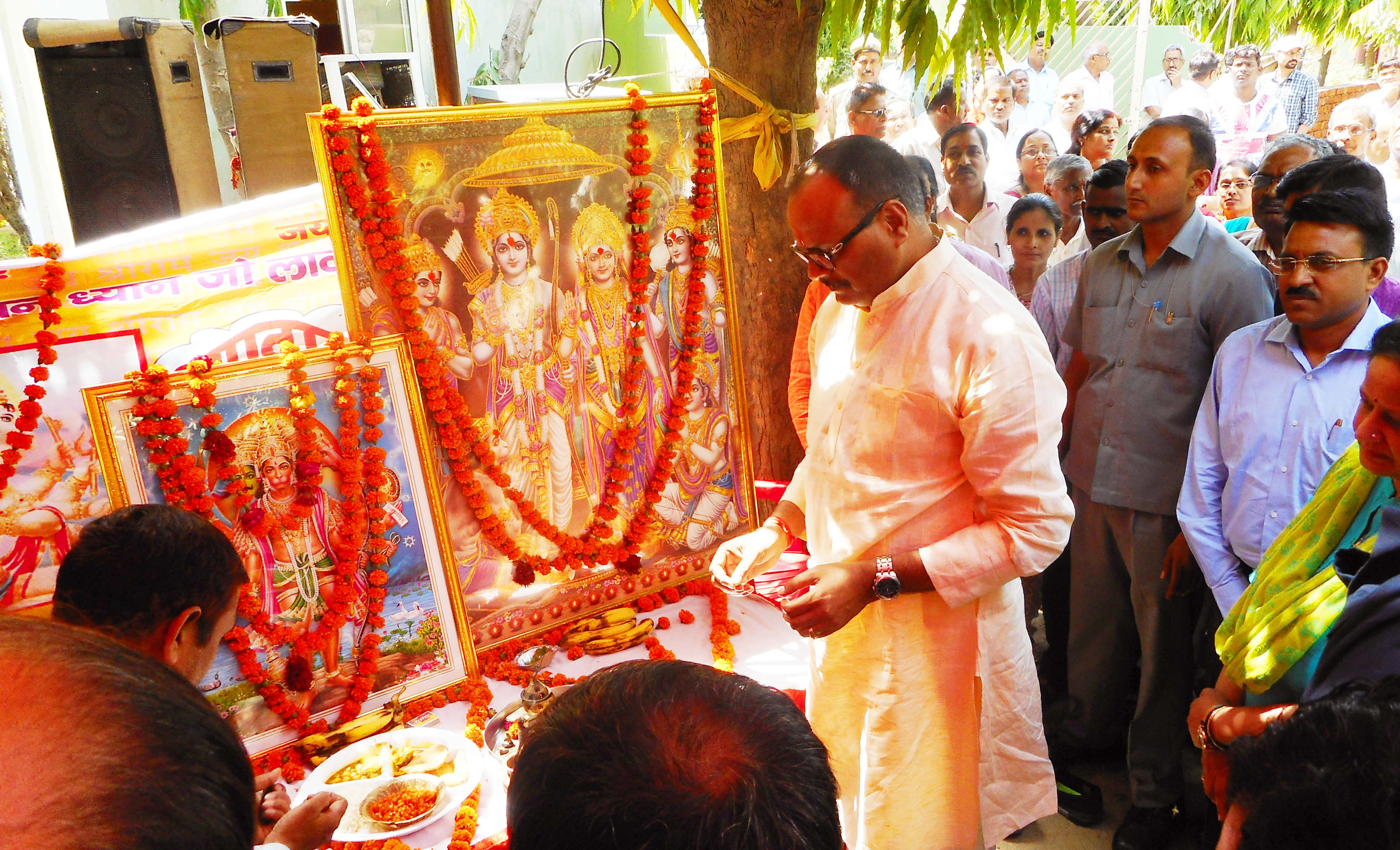
Brijesh Pathak, Minister of Law & Justice and Additional Energy Resources in Uttar Pradesh, inaugurating the bada mangal festivities at UPNEDA office in Vibhuti Khand (May 2017)

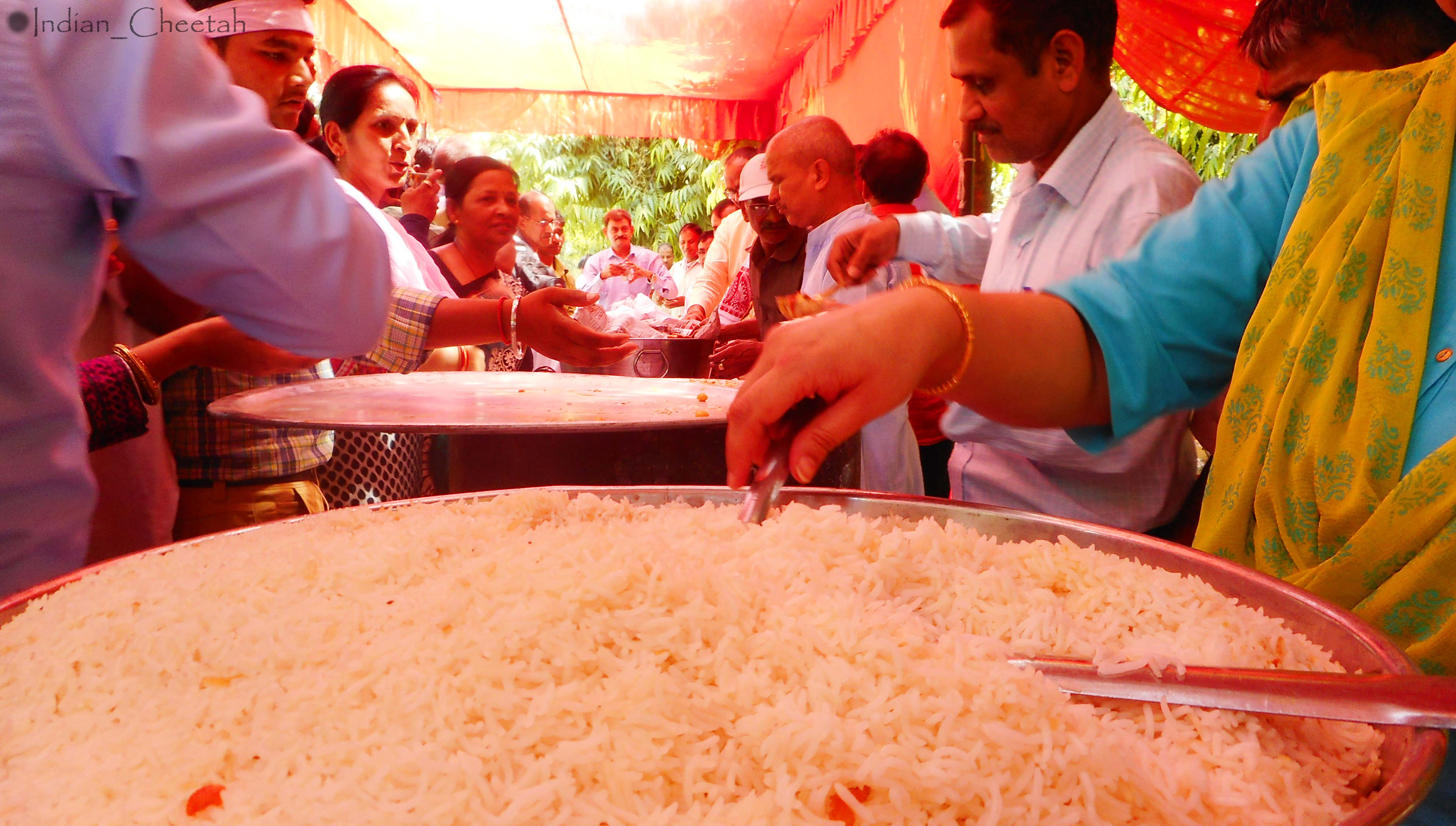
Free food being distributed on a Bada Mangal (May 2017). Bada Mangal is a ritual specific only to Lucknow.

In common with other metropolitan cities across India, Lucknow is multicultural and multilingual. Many of the cultural traits and customs peculiar to Lucknow have become living legends today. The city's contemporary culture is the result of the amalgamation of the Hindu and Muslim rulers who ruled the city simultaneously. The credit for this goes to the secular and syncretic traditions of the Nawabs of Awadh, who took a keen interest in every walk of life and encouraged these traditions to attain a rare degree of sophistication. Modern-day Lucknowites are known for their polite and polished way of speaking which is noticed by visitors. The residents of Lucknow call themselves Lucknowites or Lakhnavi. It also represents the melting pot of globalisation where the legacy of Nawab's culture continues to be reflected in the traditional vocabulary of the Urdu language of the city along with better avenues for modernisation present here.

=== Traditional outfit ===
Lucknow is known for its ghararas. It is a traditional women's outfit that originated from the Nawabs of Awadh. It is a pair of loose trousers with pleats below the knee worn with a kurta (shirt) and a dupatta (veil). It is embroidered with zari and zardozi along with gota (decorative lace on the knee area). This dress is made from over 24 metres (26 yd) of fabric, mostly silk, brocade and kamkhwab.

=== Language and poetry ===
Although Uttar Pradesh's primary official language is Hindi, the most commonly spoken language is colloquial Hindustani. Indian English is also well understood and is widely used for business and administrative purposes, as a result of India's British heritage and Commonwealth tradition, as well as globalisation. The Urdu language is also a part of Lucknowi culture and heritage. It is mostly used by wealthier families, the remaining members of the royal family as well as in Urdu poetry and on public signs. The government has taken many innovative steps to promote Urdu. Awadhi, a dialect of the Hindi dialect continuum, is the native dialect of Lucknow and has played an important role in Lucknow's history and is still used in the city's rural areas and by the urban population on the streets.

Historically, Lucknow was considered one of the great centres of Muslim culture. Two poets, Mir Babar Ali Anis and Mirza Dabeer, became legendary exponents of a unique genre of Muslim elegiacal poetry called marsiya centred on Imam Husain's supreme sacrifice in the Battle of Karbala, which is commemorated during the annual observance of Muharram.

The revolutionary Ram Prasad Bismil, who was hanged by the British at Gorakhpur jail, was largely influenced by the culture of Lucknow and remembered its name in his poetry. Surrounding towns such as Kakori, Daryabad, Fatehpur, Barabanki, Rudauli, and Malihabad produced many eminent Urdu poets and litterateurs including Mohsin Kakorvi, Majaz Lakhnawi, Khumar Barabankvi and Josh Malihabadi.

=== Cuisine ===
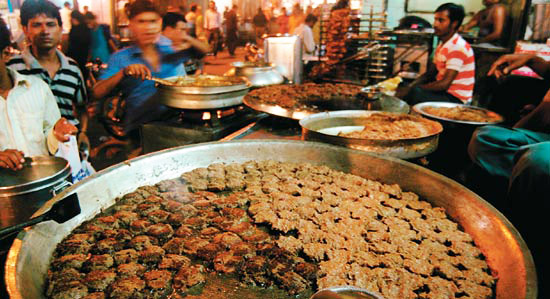
Tunday's Gelawati Kababs, Lucknow's speciality

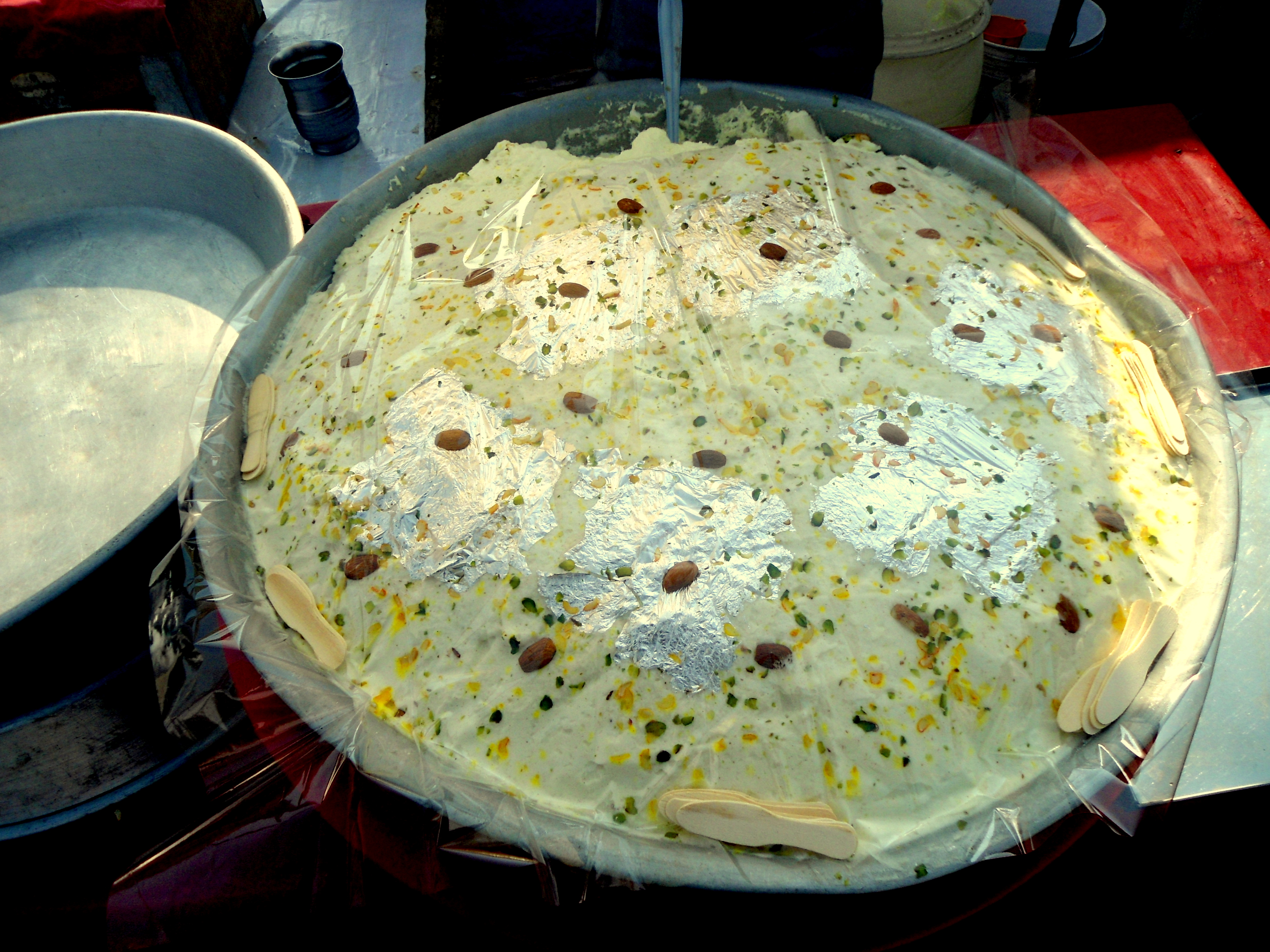
Malai Makkhan, a winter delicacy of Lucknow

The Awadh region has its own distinct Nawabi-style cuisine. Since ages, the Bawarchis (chefs) and Rakabdars (royal chefs) have developed great finesse in cooking and presentation of food, under royal patronage. This gave rise to the art of cooking over a slow fire (or Dum style cooking), which has become synonymous with "Awadhi" cuisine. These Bawarchis added elaborately prepared dishes like kababs, kormas, kaliya, nahari-kulchas, zarda, sheermal, roomali rotis and warqi parathas to the traditional "Awadhi" dastarkhwaan (feast of dishes). The best-known dishes of this area consist of biryanis, kebabs and breads. Kebabs are served in a variety of styles; kakori, galawati, shami, boti, patili-ke, ghutwa and seekh are among the available varieties. Tunde ke kabab restaurants are popular for a type of soft kebab developed by a one-armed chef (hence the name Tunday) for a Nawab who had lost his teeth. The reputation of Lucknow's kebabs is not limited to the local population and the dish attracts people from other cities as well as other countries.

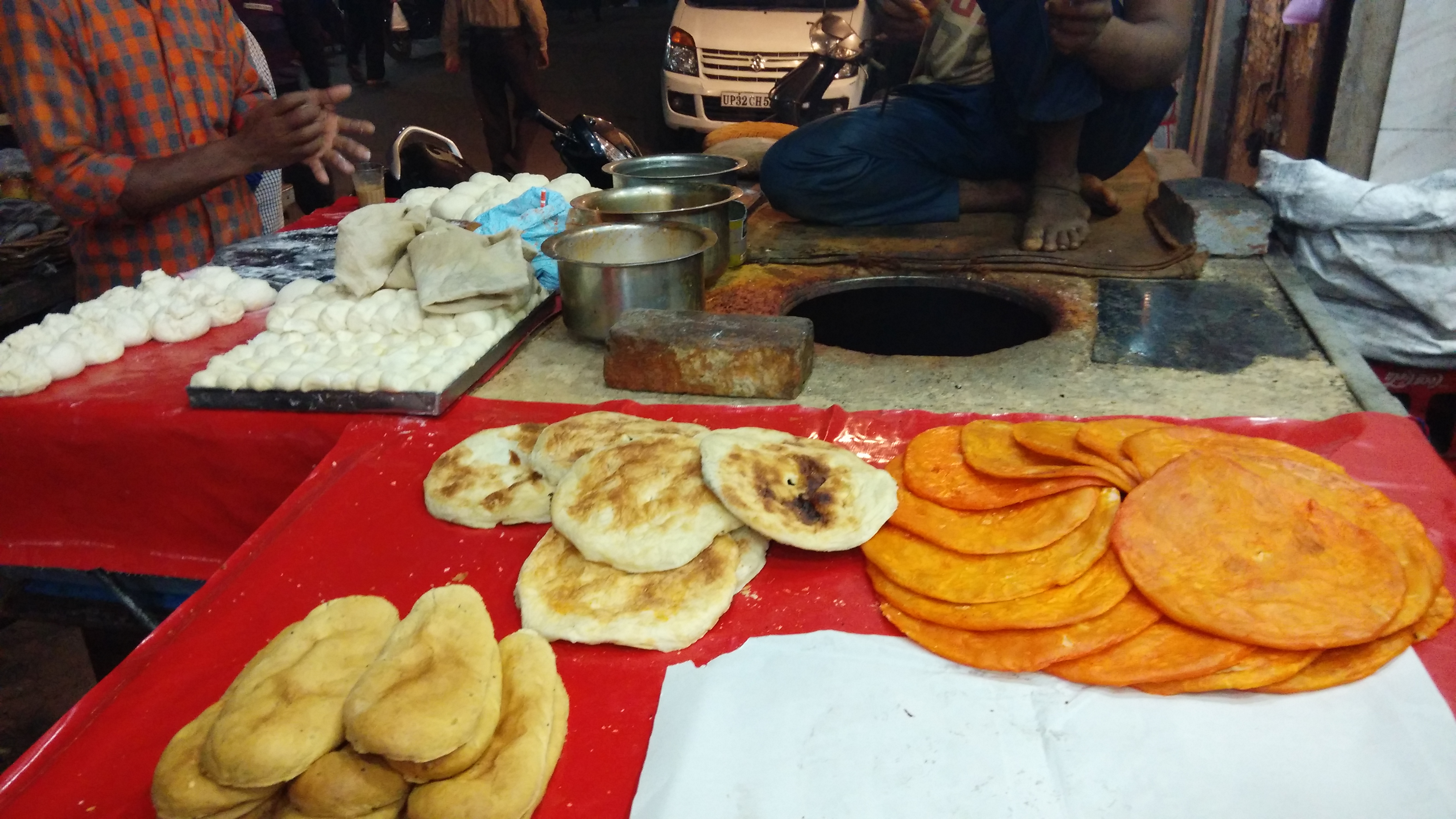
Breads of Lucknow- Kulcha, Sheermal, Naan etc.

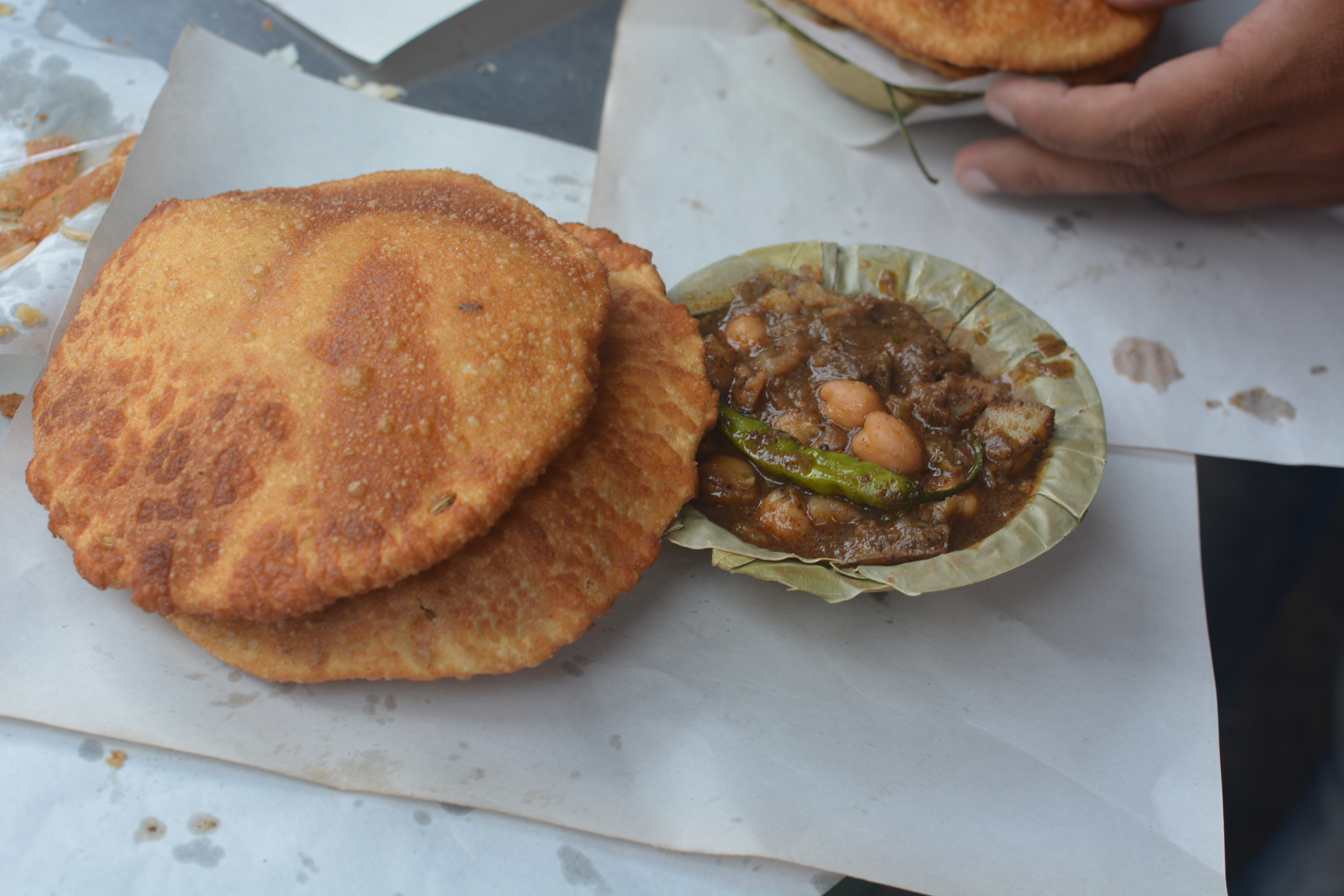
Kachori Sabzi, traditional Lucknow breakfast

Lucknow is also known for its chaats, street food, kulfi, paan and sweets. Nahari kulche, a dish prepared using goat mutton, is popular among non-vegetarians. Sheermal is a type of sweet bread dish (paratha) prepared in Lucknow. Some restaurants in the city are around a century old; there are also many high-end restaurants, bakeries, lounges and pubs which cater to the affluent class and foreign travellers.

=== Festivals ===
Indian festivals such as Christmas, Diwali, Durga Puja, Eid, Holi, Raksha Bandhan and Vijayadashami are celebrated with great pomp and show in the city. Some of the other festivals or processions are as follows:

- Lucknow Mahotsav

Lucknow Festival is organised every year to showcase Uttar Pradesh art and culture and to promote tourism. With 1975–76 designated South Asian Tourism Year, Lucknow took the opportunity to promote the city's art, culture and tourism to national and international tourists. The first Lucknow Festival was staged as a part of this promotion and ever since, with some exceptions, Lucknow Mahotsava has taken place annually.

- Lucknow Literature Festival

This is an annual literature festival held in the month of November every year since 2013. Lucknow LitFest is India's second-largest literature festival featuring some of the greatest writers and thinkers from across the globe.

- Muharram

Lucknow is known as a seat of Shia Islam and the epitome of Shia culture in India. Muslims observe Muharram, the first month of the Islamic calendar and on Ashura (the tenth day of the month) mourn the memory of Imam Husain, grandson of the Islamic prophet, Muhammad. Muharram processions in Lucknow have a special significance and began during the reign of the Awadh Nawabs.

Processions such as Shahi Zarih, Jaloos-e-Mehndi, Alam-e-Ashura and Chup Tazia had special significance by the Shia community and were affected with great religious zeal and fervour until 1977 the government of Uttar Pradesh banned public Azadari processions. For the following twenty years, processions and gatherings took place in private or community spaces including Talkatora Karbala, Bara Imambara (Imambara Asifi), Chota Imambara (Imambara Husainabad), Dargah Hazrat Abbas, Shah Najaf and Imambara Ghufran Ma'ab. The ban was partially lifted in 1997 and Shias were successful in taking out the first Azadari procession in January 1998 on the 21st of Ramadan, the Muslim fasting month. The Shias are authorised to stage nine processions out of the nine hundred that are listed in the register of the Shias.

- Deva Mela

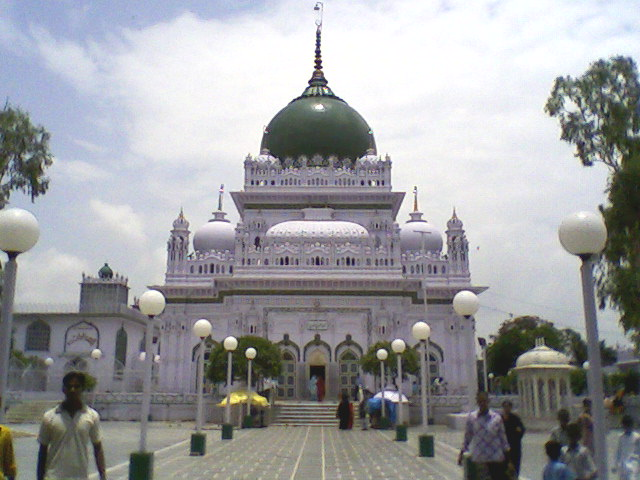
DewaSharif

Deva Mela is celebrated during the anniversary of Sufi saint Haji Waris Ali Shah at Dewa, India which is 26 K.M from Lucknow city. Sufi songs (Qawwalis) are recited at the Dargah. Devotees also carry sheets/Chadars to the shrines.

- Chup Tazia

The procession originated in Lucknow before spreading to other parts of South Asia. Dating back to the era of the Nawabs, it was started by Nawab Ahmed Ali Khan Shaukat Yar Jung a descendant of Bahu Begum. It has become one of the most important Azadari processions in Lucknow and one of the nine permitted by the government. This last mourning procession takes place on the morning of the 8th of Rabi' al-awwal, the third Muslim month and includes alam (flags), Zari and a tazia (an imitation of the mausoleums in Karbala). It originates at the Imambara Nazim Saheb in Victoria Street then moves in complete silence through Patanala until it terminates at the Karbala Kazmain, where the colossal black ta'zieh is buried.

- Bada Mangal festival is celebrated in May as a birthday of the ancient Hanuman temple known as Purana Mandir. During this festival, fairs are conducted by the local public in the whole city. Bhandara is organised by local people almost in all streets across the city and serves free food to all the passersby irrespective of religion. Many of the Muslim Community also set up these Bhandara. It is celebrated in the name of Hindu God Lord Hanuman and reflects the Ganga Jamuni Tehzeeb.

=== Dance, drama and music ===
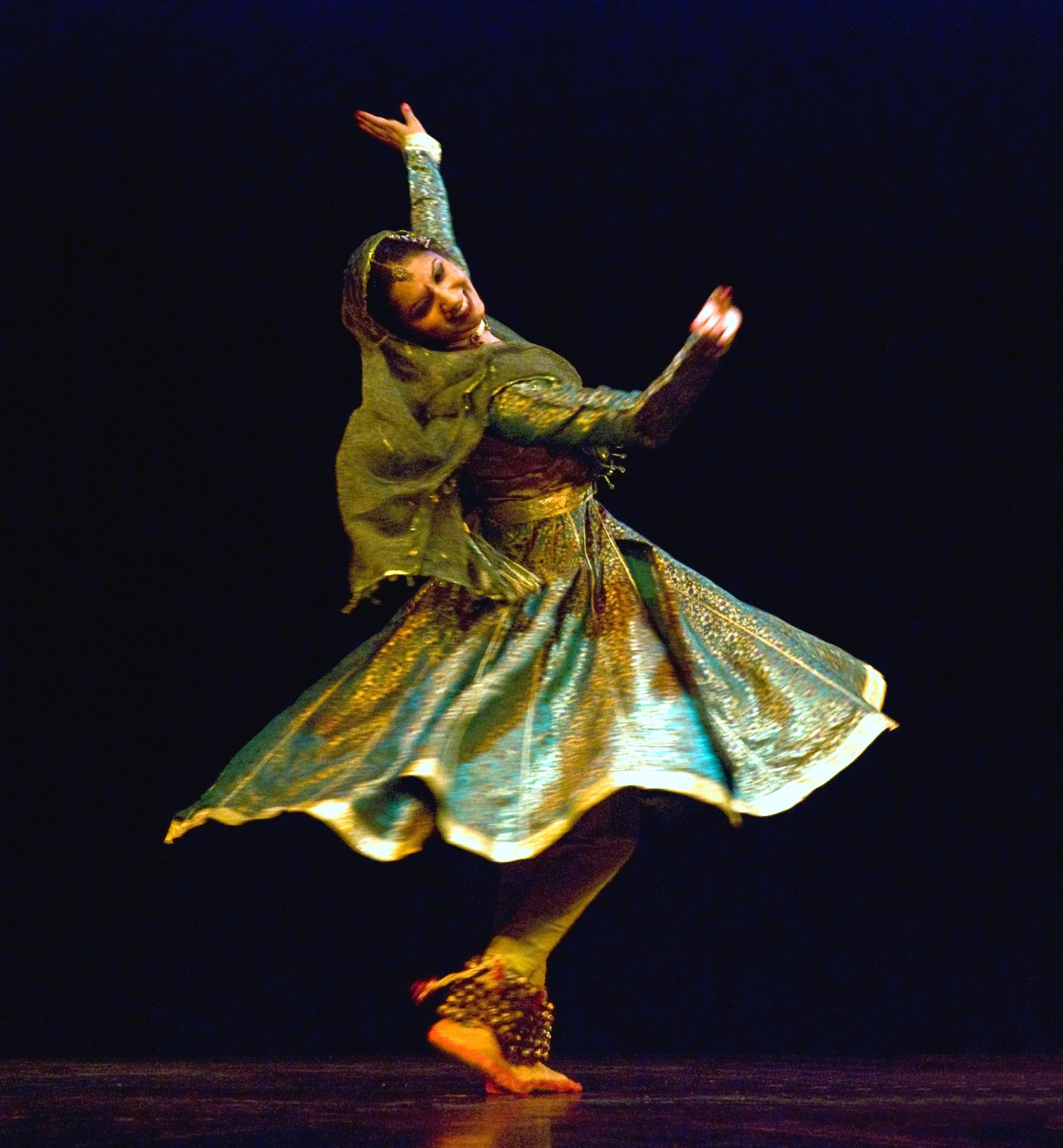
A dancer posing during a kathak dance sequence. The dance has its origins in Northern India and especially Lucknow.

The classical Indian dance form Kathak originated from Lucknow. Wajid Ali Shah, the last Nawab of Awadh, was a great patron and a passionate champion of Kathak. Lachhu Maharaj, Acchchan Maharaj, Shambhu Maharaj and Birju Maharaj have kept this tradition alive.

Lucknow is also the home city of the eminent ghazal singer Begum Akhtar. A pioneer of the style, "Ae Mohabbat Tere anjaam pe rona aaya" is one of her best known musical renditions. Bhatkande Music Institute University at Lucknow is named after the musician Vishnu Narayan Bhatkhande Bhartendu Academy of Dramatic Arts (BNA), also known as Bhartendu Natya Academy, is a theatre-training institute situated at Gomti Nagar. It is a deemed university and an autonomous organisation under the Ministry of Culture, Government of Uttar Pradesh. It was set up in 1975 by the Sangeet Natak Akademy (government of Uttar Pradesh), and became an independent drama school in 1977. Apart from government institutes, there are many private theatre groups including IPTA, Theatre Arts Workshop (TAW), Darpan, Manchkriti and the largest youth theatre group, Josh. This is a group for young people to experience theatre activities, workshops and training.

Lucknow is also the birthplace of musicians including Naushad, Talat Mahmood, Anup Jalota, Shantanu Moitra, Amitabh Bhattacharya, Palash Sen and Baba Sehgal as well as British pop celebrity Sir Cliff Richard.

=== Lucknow Chikan ===
Lucknow is known for embroidery works including chikankari, zari, zardozi, kamdani and gota making (gold lace weaving).

Chikankari is an embroidery work well known all over India. This 400-year-old art in its present form was developed in Lucknow and it remains the only location where the skill is practised today. Chikankari constitutes 'shadow work' and is a delicate and artistic hand embroidery done using white thread on fine white cotton cloth such as fine muslin or chiffon. Yellowish muga silk is sometimes used in addition to the white thread. The work is done on caps, kurtas, saris, scarfs, and other vestments. The chikan industry, almost unknown under the Nawabs, has not only survived but has flourished. About 2,500 entrepreneurs have engaged in manufacturing chikan for sale in local, national and international markets with Lucknow the largest exporter of chikan embroidered garments.

As a sign of recognition, in December 2008, the Indian Geographical Indication Registry (GIR) accorded Geographical Indication (GI) status for chikankari, recognising Lucknow as the exclusive hub for its manufacture.

=== Quality of life ===
Lucknow was ranked "India's second happiest city" in a survey conducted by IMRB International and LG Corporation, after only Chandigarh. It fared better than other metropolitan cities in India including New Delhi, Bangalore and Chennai. Lucknow was found to be better than other cities in areas such as food, transit and overall citizen satisfaction.

== Education ==
Lucknow is home to a number of prominent educational and research organisations including Indian Institute of Management Lucknow (IIM-L), Indian Institute of Information Technology, Lucknow (IIIT-L), Central Drug Research Institute (CDRI), Indian Institute of Toxicology Research, National Botanical Research Institute (NBRI), Institute of Engineering and Technology (IET Lko), Dr. Ram Manohar Lohia National Law University (RMNLU), Institute of Hotel Management, Lucknow (IHM), Sanjay Gandhi Postgraduate Institute of Medical Sciences (SGPGI), Dr. Ram Manohar Lohia Institute of Medical Sciences and King George's Medical University (KGMU). The National P.G. College, affiliated to the University of Lucknow, was ranked as the second-best college imparting formal education in the country by the National Assessment and Accreditation Council in 2014.

Educational institutions in the city include seven universities including the University of Lucknow, a Babasaheb Bhimrao Ambedkar University, a technical university (Uttar Pradesh Technical University), a law university (RMLNLU), an Islamic university (DUNU) and many polytechnics, engineering institutes and industrial-training institutes. Other research organisations in the state include the Central Institute of Medicinal and Aromatic Plants, Central Food Technological Research Institute, and the Central Glass and Ceramic Research Institute.

Some of Uttar Pradesh's major schools are located in Lucknow including Delhi Public School having its branches in Eldeco, Indiranagar. Lucknow International Public School, City Montessori School, Colvin Taluqdars' College, Centennial Higher Secondary School, St. Francis' College, Loreto Convent Lucknow, St. Mary's Convent Inter College, Kendriya Vidyalaya, Lucknow Public School, Stella Maris Inter College, Seth M.R. Jaipuria School, Cathedral School, Mary Gardiner's Convent School, Modern School, Amity International School, St. Agnes, Army Public School, Mount Carmel College, Study Hall, Christ Church College, Rani Laxmi Bai School and Central Academy, Study Hall School, Vidyasthali Kanar Inter College (Unit of SHEF foundation).

City Montessori School, with over 20 branches spread throughout the city, is the only school in the world to have been awarded a UNESCO Prize for Peace Education. CMS also holds a Guinness World Record for being the largest school in the world, with over 40,000 pupils. The school consistently ranks among the top schools of India.

La Martiniere Lucknow, founded in 1845, is the only school in the world to have been awarded a battle honour. It is one of the oldest schools in India, often ranked among the top ten schools in the country. Lucknow also has a sports college named Guru Gobind Singh Sports College.

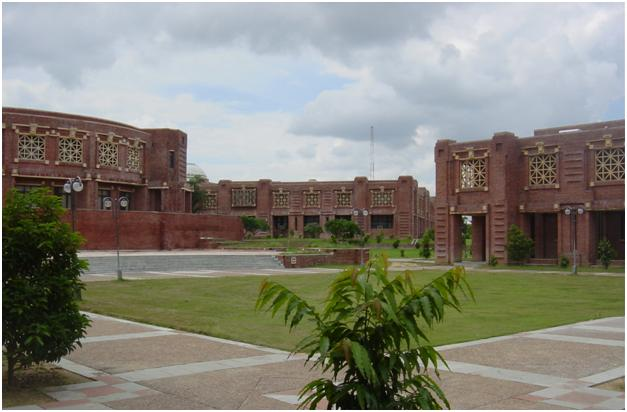
Indian Institute of Management Lucknow

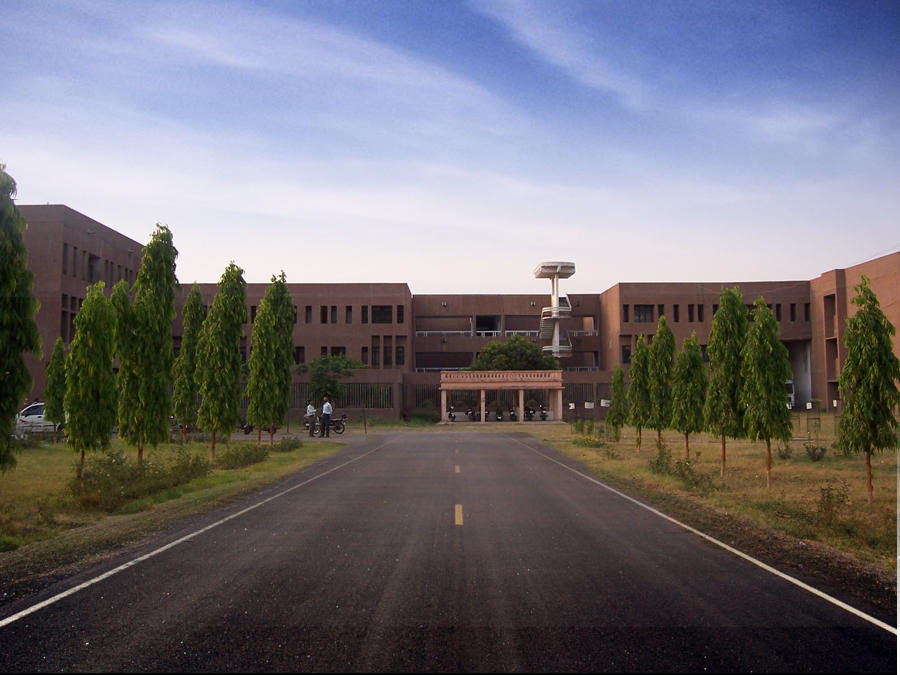
Institute of Engineering and Technology, Lucknow

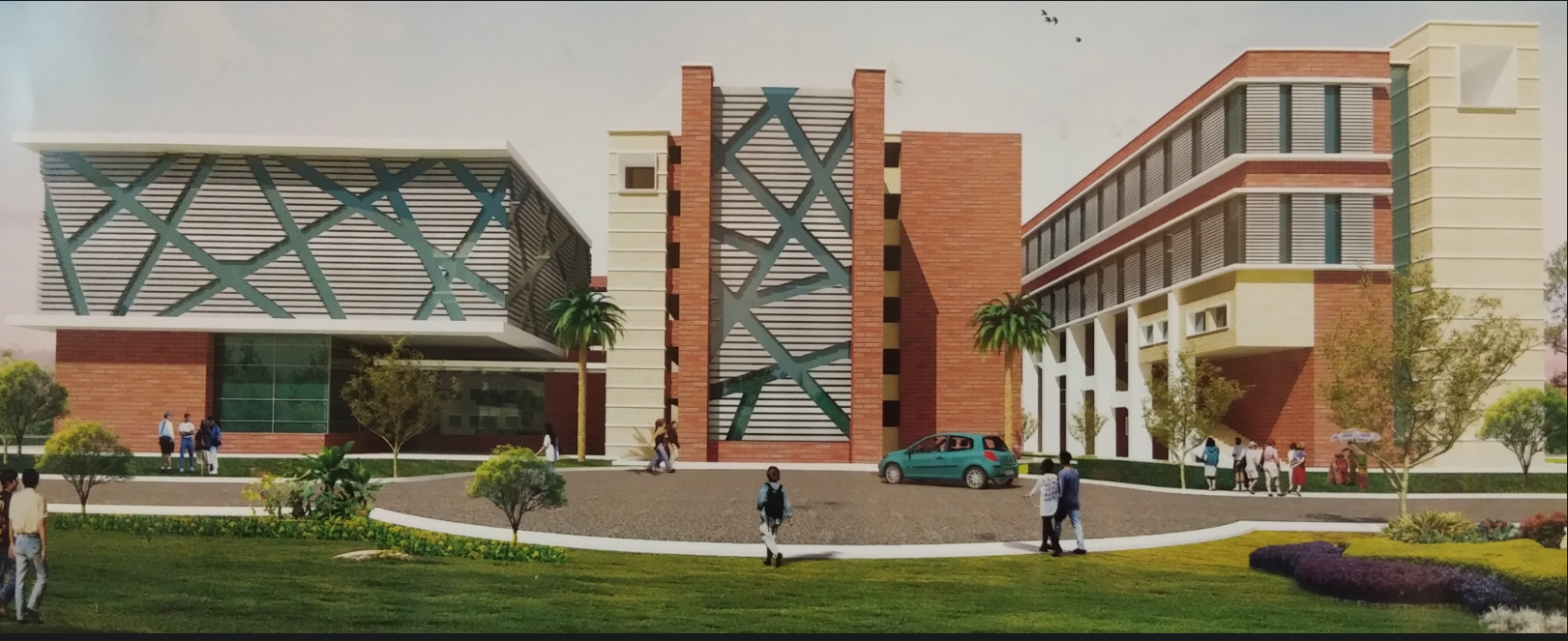
Indian Institute of Information Technology, Lucknow

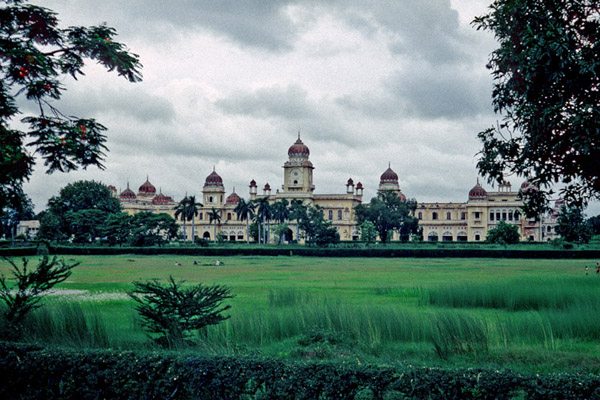
University of Lucknow

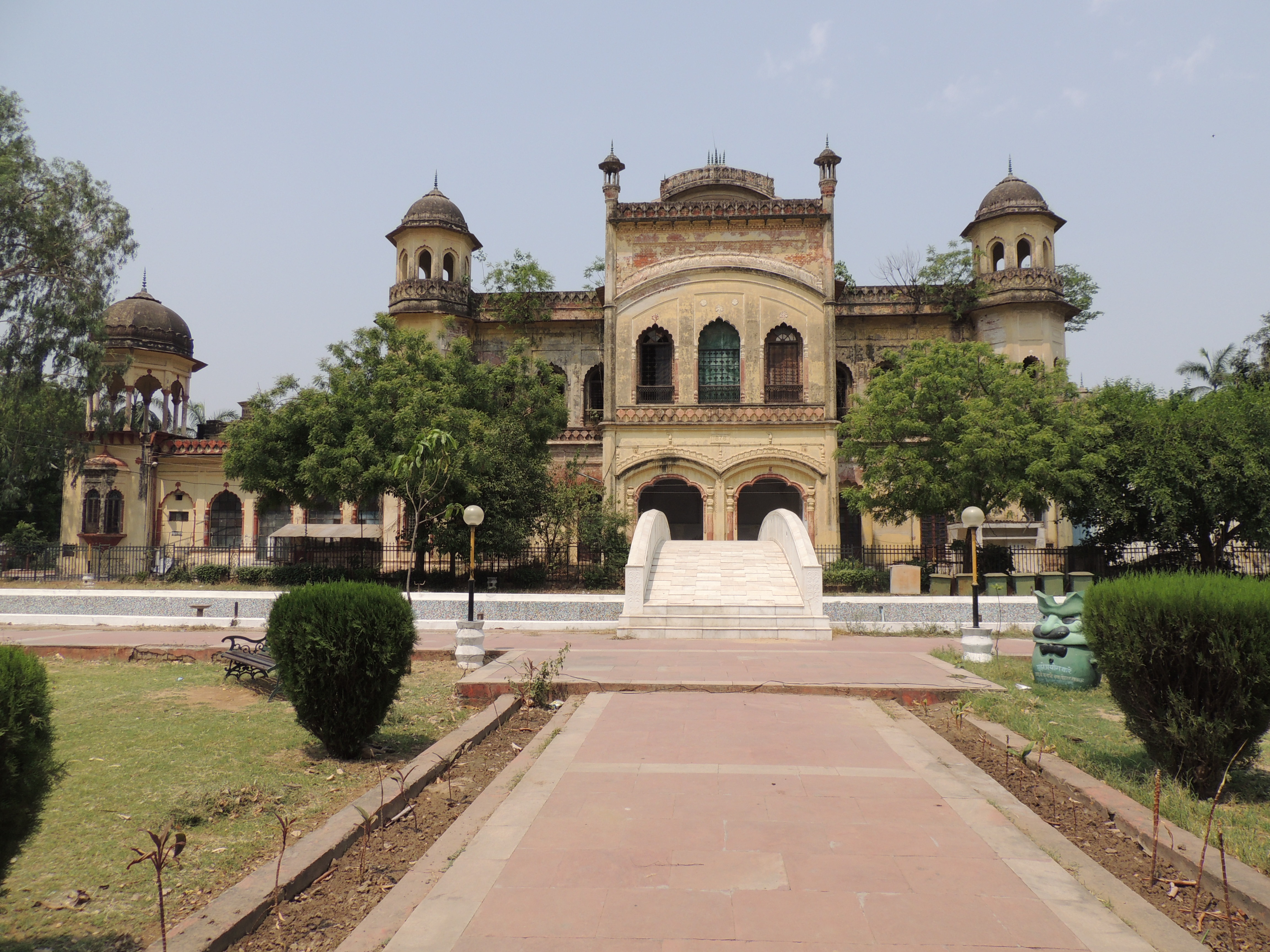
Bhatkhande Sanskriti Vishwavidyalaya

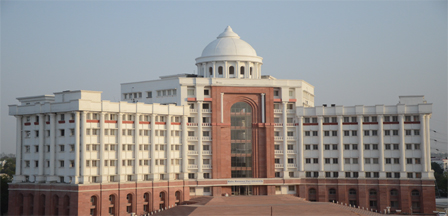
Babu Banarasi Das University

=== Minority institutions and seminaries ===
There are several minority educational institutions in the city including Darul Uloom Nadwatul Ulama, Integral University, Khwaja Moinuddin Chishti Language University, Lucknow Christian College, Shia College, Era University, Era's Lucknow Medical College, and Maulana Azad National Urdu University's satellite campus.

== Media ==
Lucknow has had an influence on the Hindi film industry as the birthplace of poet, dialogue writer and script writer K. P. Saxena, Suresh Chandra Shukla born 10 February 1954 along with veteran Bollywood and Bengali film actor Pahari Sanyal, who came from the city's well known Sanyal family. Several movies have used Lucknow as their backdrop including Vinod Kumar’s 1968 film Mere Huzoor, Shashi Kapoor's Junoon, Muzaffar Ali's Umrao Jaan and Gaman, Satyajit Ray's Shatranj ke khiladi. Ismail Merchant's Shakespeare Wallah, PAA, the 2022 Hindi feature film Vikram Vedha and Shailendra Pandey's JD. In the movie Gadar: Ek Prem Katha Lucknow was used to depict Pakistan, with locations including Lal Pul, the Taj Hotel and the Rumi Darwaza used in Tanu Weds Manu. Some parts of Ladies vs Ricky Bahl, Bullett Raja, Ishaqzaade, Ya Rab and Dabangg 2 were shot in Lucknow or at other sites nearby. A major section of the Bollywood movie, Daawat-e-Ishq starring Aditya Roy Kapur and Parineeti Chopra was shot in the city as was Baawre, an Indian TV drama, airing on the Life OK channel. The government has announced to develop two film cities in Lucknow. In addition, several Bengali films have also been shot in the city. The prominent ones include Deya Neya, Badshahi Angti (film), Aschhe Abar Shabor, Ami, Shey O Shakha and Aboyer Biye(1957).

The news channel Bharat Samachar is headquartered in Lucknow. Newspaper services in the city include Amar Ujala, Dainik Jagran, Hindustan Times, The Times of India and Dainik Bhaskar.

The Pioneer newspaper, headquartered in Lucknow and started in 1865, is the second-oldest English-language newspaper in India still in production. The country's first prime minister Jawaharlal Nehru founded The National Herald in the city prior to World War II with Manikonda Chalapathi Rau as its editor.

One of the earliest All India Radio stations has been operational in Lucknow since 1938.

FM radio transmission started in Lucknow in 2000. The city has the following FM radio stations:

- Radio City 91.1 MHz
- Red FM 93.5 MHz
- Radio Mirchi 98.3 MHz
- AIR FM Rainbow 100.7 MHz
- Fever 104 FM 104.0 MHz
- Gyan Vani 105.6 MHz (educational)

"My Lucknow My Pride" is a mobile app launched by the district administration of Lucknow circa December 2015 in efforts to preserve "the cultural heritage of Lucknow" and to encourage tourism.

== Sports ==
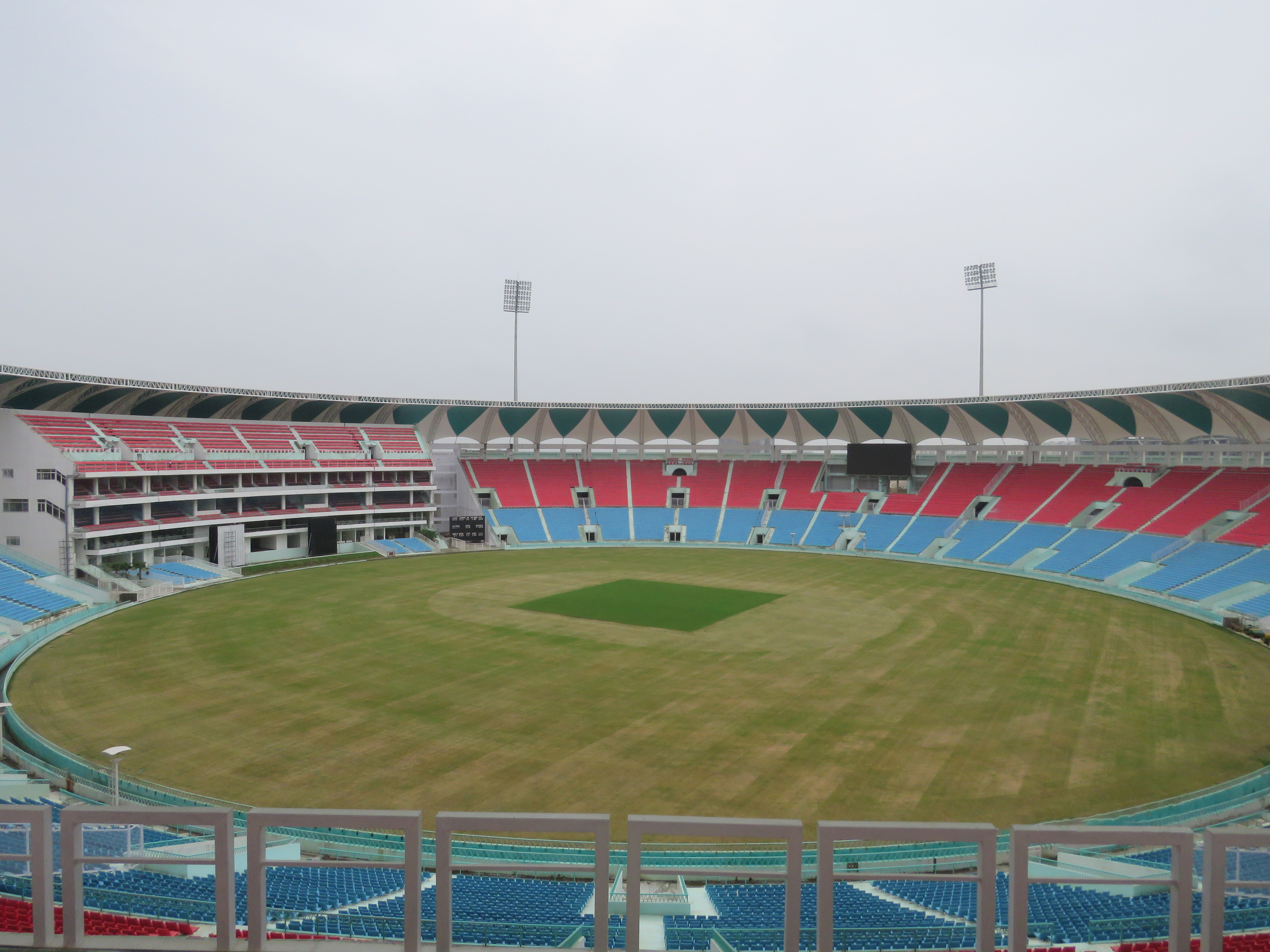
BRSABV Ekana Cricket Stadium

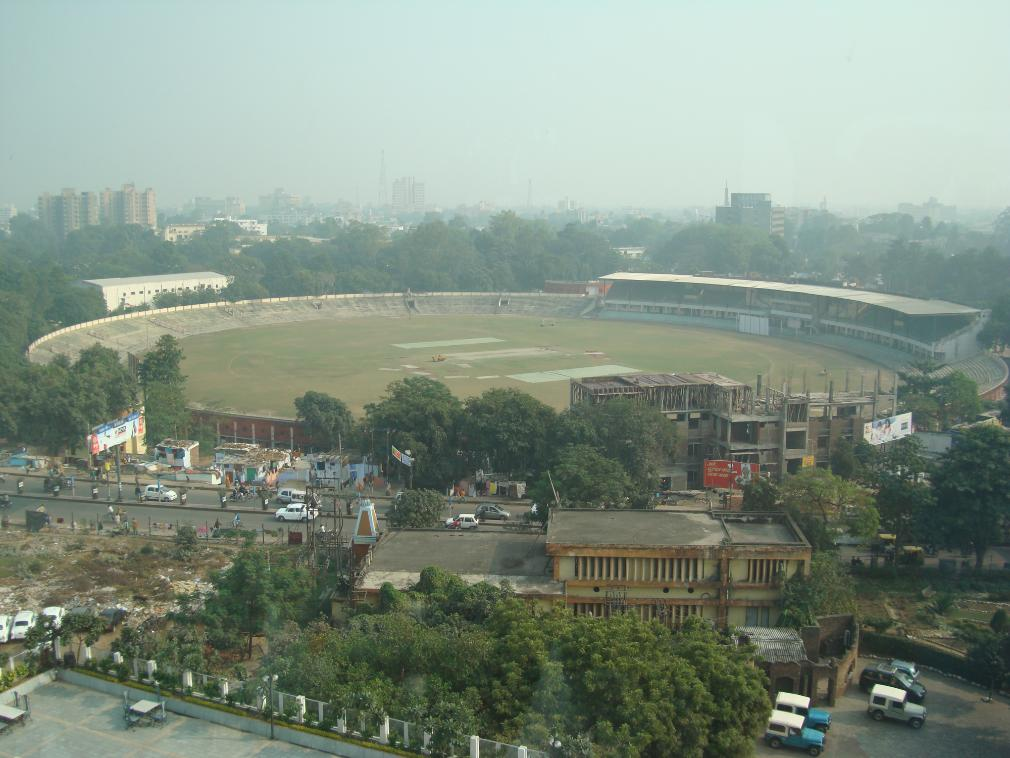
K. D. Singh Babu Stadium, Lucknow

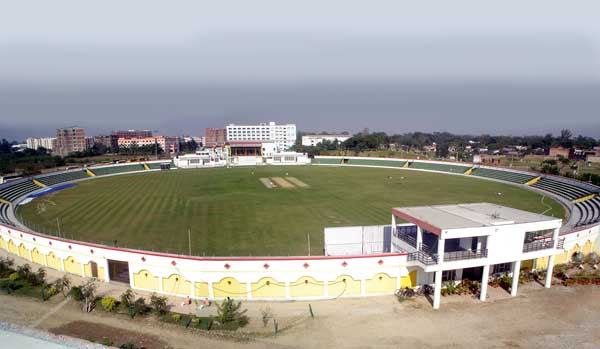
Dr. Akhilesh Das Gupta Stadium

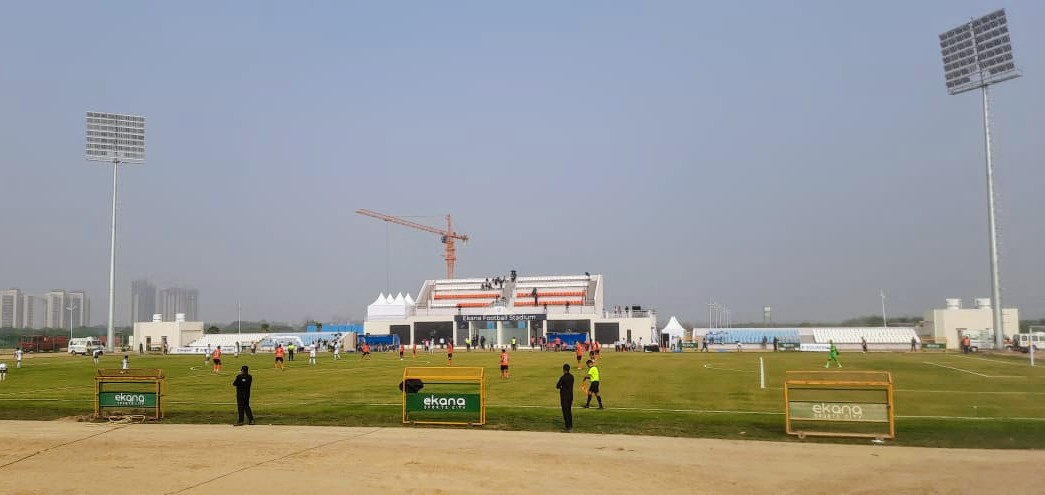
Ekana International Football Stadium

Cricket, association football, badminton, golf, and hockey are among the most popular sports in the city.

The main sports hub is the K. D. Singh Babu Stadium, which also has a swimming pool and indoor games complex. There are plans to develop KDSB stadium along the lines of Ekana Stadium. KDSB stadium needs Rs 2 billion in funds to redesign and upgrade as per international standards. The other stadiums are Dhyan Chand Astroturf Stadium, Mohammed Shahid Synthetic Hockey Stadium, Dr. Akhilesh Das Gupta Stadium at Northern India Engineering College, Babu Banarsi Das UP Badminton Academy, Charbagh, Mahanagar, Chowk and the Sports College near the Integral University.

In September 2017, Ekana International Cricket Stadium was opened to the public as it hosted 2017–18 Duleep Trophy. On 6 November 2018 Ekana International Cricket Stadium hosted its first T20 international match between Indian national cricket team and West Indies cricket team.

It is the third largest cricket stadium in India by capacity after Kolkata's Eden Gardens and Ahmedabad's Narendra Modi Stadium. For decades Lucknow hosted the Sheesh Mahal Cricket Tournament.

Lucknow is the headquarters for the Badminton Association of India. Located in Gomti Nagar, it was formed in 1934 and has been holding national-level tournaments in India since 1936. Syed Modi Grand Prix is an international Badminton competition held here. Junior-level Badminton players receive their training in Lucknow after which they are sent to Bangalore.

The Lucknow Race Course in Lucknow Cantonment is spread over 28.42 hectares (0.2842 km^{2}; 70.22 acres); the course's 3.2 kilometres (2.0 mi)-long race track is the longest in India.

The Lucknow Golf Club is on the sprawling greens of La Martinière College.

The city has produced several national and world-class sporting personalities. Lucknow sports hostel has produced international-level cricketers Mohammad Kaif, Piyush Chawla, Suresh Raina, Gyanendra Pandey, Praveen Kumar and R. P. Singh. Other notable sports personalities include hockey Olympians K. D. Singh, Jaman Lal Sharma, Mohammed Shahid and Ghaus Mohammad, the tennis player who became the first Indian to reach the quarter finals at Wimbledon.

In October 2021, an IPL franchise based in Lucknow was officially formed and was later named Lucknow Super Giants. It will play its home matches at BRSABV Ekana Cricket Stadium.

=== City-based clubs ===
Club	Sport	Team	Homeground	Founded
Uttar Pradesh Cricket Team	Cricket	Ranji Trophy Vijay Hazare Trophy Syed Musthaq Ali Trophy	BRSABV Ekana Cricket Stadium	1934
Uttar Pradesh Cricket Team	Cricket	Ranji Trophy Vijay Hazare Trophy Syed Musthaq Ali Trophy	K.D Singh Babu Stadium	1934
Awadhe Warriors	Badminton	Premier Badminton League	Babu Banarasi Das Indoor Stadium	2015
Uttar Pradesh Wizards	Field hockey	Hockey India League	Major Dhyan Chand Stadium	2012
Lucknow Super Giants	Cricket	Indian Premier League	BRSABV Ekana Cricket Stadium	2021
UP Yoddha	Kabaddi	Pro Kabaddi League	Babu Banarasi Das Indoor Stadium	2017
UP Warriorz	Cricket	Women's Premier League	BRSABV Ekana Cricket Stadium	2023
UP Rudras	Field hockey	Hockey India League	Major Dhyan Chand Hockey Stadium, Lucknow	2024

== Parks and recreation ==
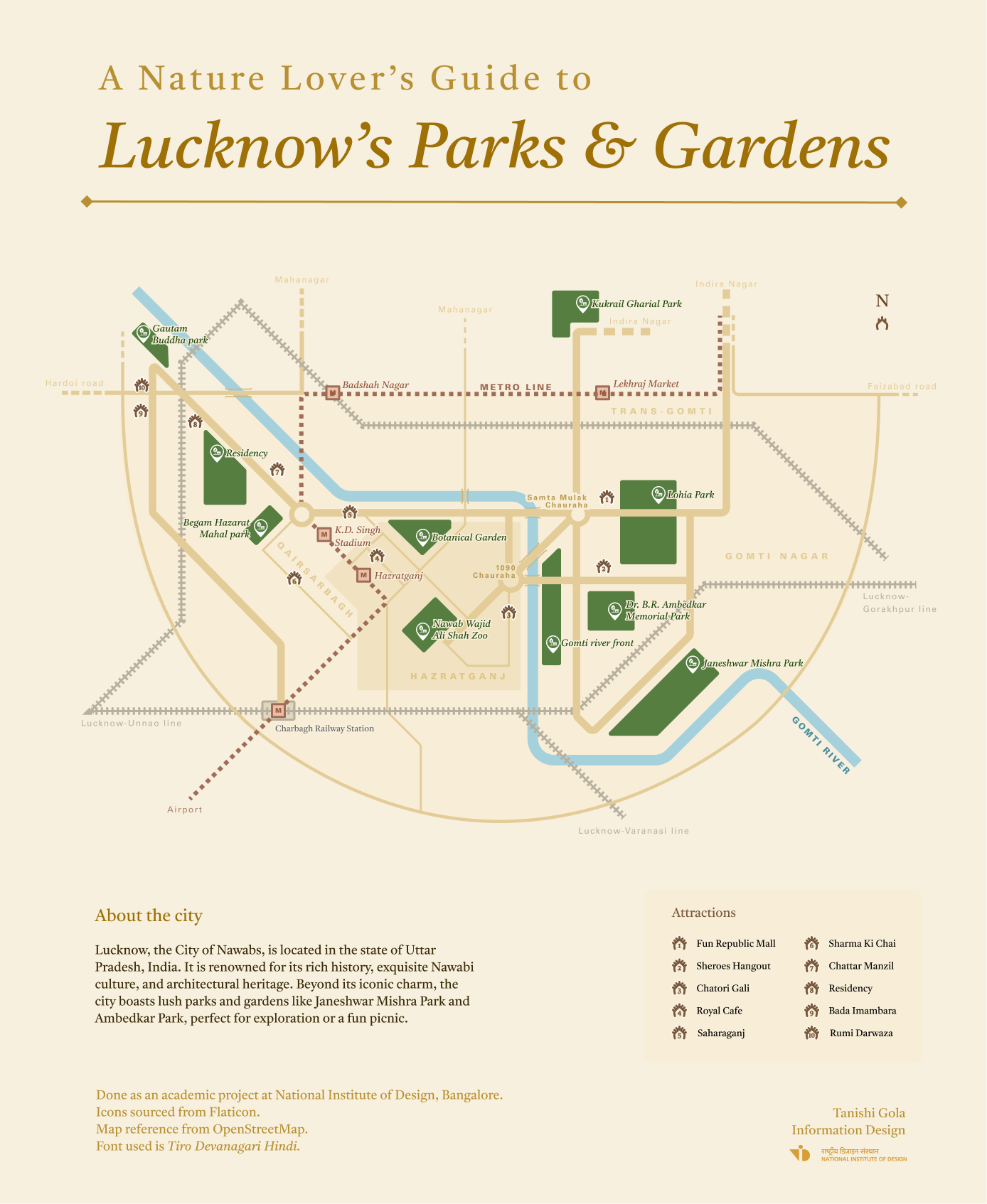
A schematic map of Lucknow's parks and gardens in English

The city has parks and recreation areas managed by the Lucknow Development Authority. These include Kukrail Reserve Forest, Qaisar Bagh, Gomti Riverfront Park, Dr. Ram Manohar Lohia Park, Eco Park, Ambedkar Memorial Park, Janeshwar Mishra park, the largest park in Asia, Buddha Park, Hathi Park. It boasts lush greenery, a human-made lake, India's longest cycling and jogging track and a variety of flora. The plan is also to set up a giant Ferris wheel inside the park on the lines of London Eye, providing a panoramic view of the city. Kukrail Picnic Spot (crocodile-breeding sanctuary), located near Lucknow Indiranagar Area. This is Asia's largest crocodile-breeding centre. This along with a small zoo and ample open space make it unique.

== Sister cities ==
- Brisbane, Queensland Australia

== Historical places ==
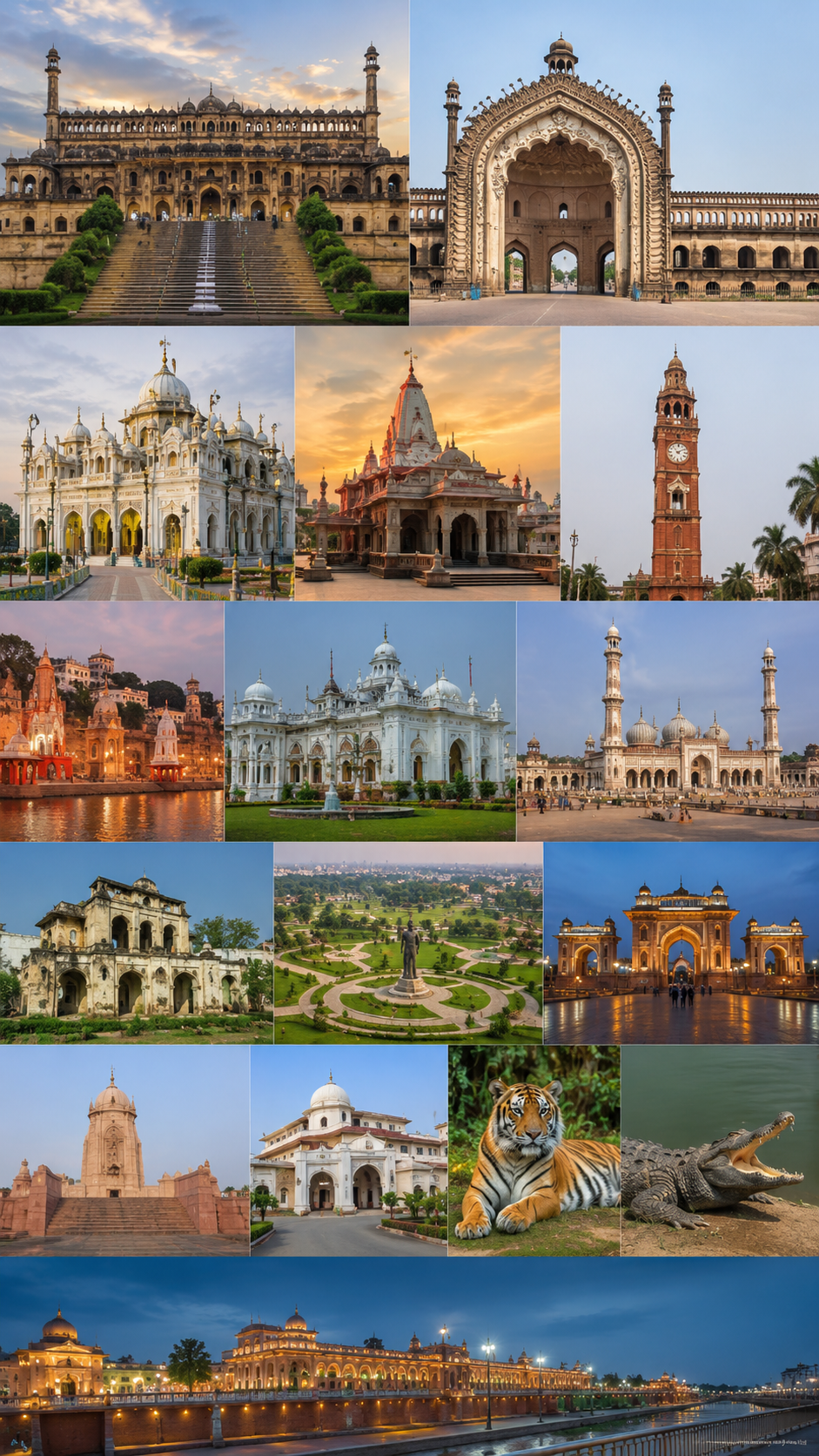
Tourist place in Lucknow

Lucknow is known for its historical monuments, religious sites, parks, museums, and Nawabi heritage architecture. Major tourist attractions in the city include:

- Bara Imambara – famous for Bhul Bhulaiya and Awadhi architecture
- Chota Imambara – known for chandeliers and Islamic architecture
- Rumi Darwaza – iconic gateway into Lucknow, built during the Nawabi era
- Hanuman Setu Temple – a popular Hindu temple dedicated to Lord Hanuman
- Mankameshwar Mandir – an historic Shiva temple on the banks of the Gomti River
- Chandrika Devi Temple – an important Hindu pilgrimage site near the city
- Husainabad Clock Tower – Victorian-style clock tower in old Lucknow
- The Residency – an historic site associated with the Indian Rebellion of 1857
- Janeshwar Mishra Park – one of Asia's largest urban parks
- Ambedkar Memorial Park – a monument dedicated to social reformers and Dalit icons
- Dilkusha Kothi – the remains of an 18th-century Nawabi palace
- Nawab Wajid Ali Shah Zoological Garden – a major zoological park and tourist attraction
- Rashtra Prerna Sthal – a memorial and public park dedicated to national leaders and social inspiration in Lucknow
- Imambara Ghufran Ma'ab
- Aminabad
- La Martiniere Lucknow
- Isabella Thoburn College
- Qaisar Bagh
- Shah Najaf Imambara
- Dargah of Hazrat Abbas
- Dilkusha Kothi
- Karbala of Dayanat-ud-Daulah
- Tomb of Mir Babar Ali Anis
- Imambara Sibtainabad (Maqbara of Amjad Ali Shah)
- Rauza Kazmain
- Usman Enclave
- All Saints Garrison Church, Lucknow
- Alambagh
- Begum Hazrat Mahal Park

== See also ==
- Aastha Hospice & Geriatric Care Centre (2003)
- Amir-ud-daula Public Library
- Fun Republic Mall
- Lucknow Museum of Heritage & Art
- List of cities in India by population
- List of million-plus urban agglomerations in India
- List of twin towns and sister cities in India
- National Bureau of Fish Genetic Resources
- Largest Indian cities by GDP
