= Nigoh Khas =

- village
- Nickname: Nigoh
- Location in Uttar Pradesh, India Nigoh Khas (India)
- Coordinates: 27.15°N 79.50°E
- Country: India
- State: Uttar Pradesh
- District: Kannauj

Government
  - Body: Gram panchayat
  - Member of Parliament: Shri. Subrat Pathak
- Elevation: 152 m (499 ft)

Population (2001)
  - Total: 1,500

Languages
  - Official: Hindi
- Time zone: UTC+5:30 (IST)
- PIN: 209721
- Vehicle registration: UP74
- District Magistrate: Govind Raju NS

Nigoh Khas is a village falls in Thesil Chhibramau under district Kannauj district in the northern state of Uttar Pradesh, India. The village is lying along the National Highway No. 91 (G.T. Road) on Delhi (Dadri) – Kanpur route. The nearest airport is at Lucknow (151 km) and Gursahaiganj (25 km) Railway Station is the nearest railway station.

== Demographics ==
Hindi is the local language.

== Transport ==
- By Rail

The nearest railway stations are at Farrukhabad and Gursahiganj, respectively 31 km and 25 km distant.

- By Bus

Chhibramau is nearest Bus Depot and Bus station, which is 3 km from Nigoh Khas. Rickshaws and autos are available from Chhibrmau.

== Education ==
There is a primary school in the village. Thereafter, pupils have to travel to Chhibramau.

== Distance of other major cities and towns ==
West

- Bewar (18.5 km)
- Mainpuri (48 km)
- Agra (162 km)
- Aligarh (166 km )
- Delhi (397 km )

North

- Mohammadabad, Farrukhabad (18.6 km)
- Farrukhabad (35.1 km )

East

- Gursahaiganj (28 km )
- Kanpur (128 km)
- Allahabad (328 km)

South

- Saurikh (11 km)
- Bidhuna (49 km)

== Nearby villages ==
- Sarai Bhim
- Ladaita
- Rampur Nigoh
- Bahadur Pur Nigoh
- Jawamardpur
- Sikandar Pur Nigoh
- Panthra
- Sainsar Pur
- Kundepur
- Khanpur Kurmi
- Nandlal Pur
