= Chhibramau =

- Town
- Chibramau
- Location in Uttar Pradesh, India
- Coordinates: 27.15°N 79.50°E
- Country: India
- State: Uttar Pradesh
- District: Kannauj

Government
  - Member of Parliament: Akhilesh Yadav
- Elevation: 152 m (499 ft)

Population (2023)
  - Total: 100,632

Languages
  - Official: Hindi/Urdu
- Time zone: UTC+5:30 (IST)
- PIN: 209721
- Vehicle registration: UP 74
- Member of Legislative Assembly from Chhibramau: Archana Pandey
- Website: https://chhibramau.in

Chhibramau (or Chibramau) is a nagar palika parishad and a subdivision (tehsil) of Kannauj district in the northern state of Uttar Pradesh, India.

== Geography ==
Chhibramau is located at 27°09′N 79°30′E. It has an average elevation of 152 metres (499 ft).

== History ==
Chhibramau was listed in the Ain-i Akbari (c. 1595) as a mahal under sarkar Kannauj. It was listed with an assessed revenue of 1,522,028 dams and was expected to supply 500 infantry and 20 cavalry to the Mughal army.

=== The "Chibramau Disaster" and Hodson's Adventure ===
At the time of the 1857 uprising, old hostilities between the Raja of Mainpuri and the Nawab of Farrukhabad nearly led to open war, but after a face-off between their forces in Bewar in July, both forces joined hands against British rule. The Raja did not oppose a British armed unit led by Sir James Hope Grant when it marched through the district in October, but in December he heard that Brigadier Seaton was coming with a small force from Etah to join General Walpole at Mainpuri, and advanced to Kuraoli with the intention of barring the road. Seaton, however, easily outmaneuvered the local forces, and the rebels fled in disorder, losing eight guns and about a hundred men. It was after this action that the famous Hodson of Hodson's Horse in 1857-58 carried out one of his most daring exploits. Accompanied by his second-in-command, McDowell, and 75 men, he rode across a countryside swarming with rebels to carry despatches to the Commander-in-Chief, Sir Colin Campbell. He left most of his men at Bewar, but pushed on to Chibramau with McDowell and 25 native men. There he learnt that Campbell was not at Gursahaiganj as expected, but at Miran ki Sarai, 15 miles further. The two officers rode on alone and reached Campbell's camp in safety, having ridden 55 miles in ten hours without changing horses. On their return the same evening they were warned by a native, to whom Hodson had given alms in the morning, that after their departure a party of 2,000 rebels had entered Chhibramau, killed the twenty-five troopers left there, and were now waiting for Hodson's return. Hodson and his companion nevertheless pressed on and, reaching the village, dismounted and passed quietly through it, unnoticed by the enemy. At Bewar they found a party sent by Seaton, who had heard of the disaster, and next day marched to Chibramau himself, joining forces there with Brigadier Walpole on 3 January and proceeding with him to Fatehgarh. The civil authorities then reoccupied the district, and regained complete control late in 1858.

== Demographics ==
According to Census 2011 The Chibramau Nagar Palika Parishad has population of 60,986 of which 31,661 are males while 29,325 are females. The population of the town increased By 21.30% compare to Census 2001. Population of Chhibramau was 50,279 according to the 2001 census (47% female, 53% male).

Population of Children with age of 0-6 is 8107 which is 13.29% of total population of Chibramau (NPP). In Chibramau Nagar Palika Parishad, Female Sex Ratio is of 926 against state average of 912. While Child Sex Ratio in Chhibramau is around 929 compared to Uttar Pradesh state average of 902. Literacy rate of Chhibramau city is 79.14% higher than state average of 67.68%. In Chhibramau, Male literacy is around 83.56% while female literacy rate is 74.36%.

== See also ==
- Bishungarh, Uttar Pradesh
- Dibiyapur
- Nigoh Khas
- Rampur Nigoh
