= Kailash Singh Rajput =

Indian politician

State Minister of EnergyGovernment of Uttar Pradesh
- Incumbent
- Assumed office 10 May 2026
- Chief Minister: Yogi Adityanath

Member of the Uttar Pradesh Legislative Assembly
- Incumbent
- Assumed office March 2017
- Constituency: Tirwa Assembly constituency

Personal details
- Born: 1 August 1956 (age 70) Kannauj, Uttar Pradesh, India
- Party: Bharatiya Janata Party
- Profession: Politician

Kailash Singh Rajput is an Indian politician and a Minister of State in the Government of Uttar Pradesh. Currently, he serves as the Minister of State for the Energy Department of Uttar Pradesh. He is a member of 18th Uttar Pradesh Assembly, Uttar Pradesh of India. Kailash Singh Rajput is a member of the Bhartiya Janta Party and represents the ‘Tirwa’ constituency in Kannauj district of Uttar Pradesh. He is a Minister of State in Second Yogi Adityanath ministry.

== Early life and education ==
Kailash Singh Rajput became associated with the Rashtriya Swayamsevak Sangh during his school years. While studying in Class 10, he joined the organisation and regularly attended its shakhas. He considers Atal Bihari Vajpayee, Lal Krishna Advani, and Kalyan Singh as his political role models. Inspired by their ideas and public life, he joined the Bharatiya Janata Party.

== Political career ==
He contested his first Assembly election in 1996 as a Bharatiya Janata Party candidate from the Umarda constituency in Kannauj district and was elected as a Member of the Legislative Assembly. He was re-elected from the Umarda Assembly constituency in the 2007 Uttar Pradesh Legislative Assembly election.

In the 2017 Assembly election, the Bharatiya Janata Party fielded him from the Tirwa constituency. He won the election, becoming an MLA for the third time and representing Tirwa for the first time. Based on his political work and public support in the constituency, the party again nominated him from Tirwa in the 2022 Uttar Pradesh Legislative Assembly election. He defeated Samajwadi Party candidate Vijay Bahadur Pal and was elected to the Uttar Pradesh Legislative Assembly for the fourth time.

== Posts held ==
#	From	To	Position	Comments
01	1996	2002	Member, 13th Legislative Assembly	Umarda
01	2007	2012	Member, 14th Legislative Assembly	Umarda
01	2017	2022	Member, 17th Legislative Assembly	Tirwa
01	2022	Incumbent	Member, 18th Legislative Assembly	Tirwa
