= Tahir Hussain (disambiguation) =

Tahir Hussain (1938–2010) was an Indian film producer and director.

Tahir Hussain may also refer to:

- Tahir Hussain (politician) (born 1969), Indian politician and activist from Delhi
- Tahir Hussain (physicist) (1923– 2010), Pakistani nuclear physicist
- Tahir Hussain Siddique, Indian politician, a leader of the Samajwadi Party and an ex-member of Uttar Pradesh Legislative Assembly
- Tahir Hussain Mashhadi (born 1942), officer in the Pakistan Army, and later a member of the Senate of Pakistan
