= Arvind Singh Yadav =

Indian politician

Member of Legislative Assembly
- Incumbent
- Assumed office 15 March 2012
- Preceded by: Late Sri RamPrakash Tripathi Bharatiya Janata Party

Personal details
- Party: Samajwadi Party
- Profession: Politician

Arvind Singh Yadav, more commonly known as Arvind Bhaiya is an Indian politician and belongs to Yadav family (Yadav of Chhibramau, India, Uttar Pradesh). He is a Samajwadi Party Member of Legislative Assembly (MLA), having been elected from Chhibramau constituency in the 2012 Uttar Pradesh legislative assembly election. Mr. Arvind has been elected from Chhibramau MLA seat in 2004 and 2009 general elections.

He lost his seat in the 2017 Uttar Pradesh Assembly election to Archana Pandey of the Bharatiya Janata Party.
