= Lakh Bahosi Sanctuary =

Bird sanctuary in Uttar Pradesh, India

Coordinates: 26.911°N 79.641°E

- IUCN category IV (habitat/species management area)
- Location within Uttar Pradesh Location within India
- Interactive map of Lakh Bahosi Sanctuary
- Location: Kannauj district, Uttar Pradesh
- Nearest city: Kannauj
- Area: 80.24 km^{2} (30.98 sq mi)
- Established: 1988

Lakh Bahosi Sanctuary is a bird sanctuary spread over two jheels (shallow lakes) near the villages of Lakh and Bahosi (abt 4 km apart) in Kannauj district, Uttar Pradesh, India. It is about 40 km from Kannauj. Primarily a bird sanctuary, species from 49 genera (of the 97 inhabiting India) can be seen at the sanctuary. It is one of the largest bird sanctuary in India, covering 80 km^{2} (31 sq mi) including also a stretch of the Upper Ganges canal. (Lat/Long: 26°54'47.50"N 79°39'19.20") Birds migrate and come here in the months of November to march

== Getting there ==
Lakh-Bahosi is 5 km from Indergarh Police Station. It is about 35 km from Kannauj, bus stand on the Grand Trunk Road (NH91) - the road turns right at the canal just past Tirwa (10 km distant from tirwa)(abt 15 km from Kannauj). It is about 90 km from Kanpur and 125 km and 3 hours drive from Kanpur Airport.

== Attraction ==
Spread over 3 km^{2} (1.2 sq mi) beside the Bahosi Lake, the sanctuary is home to various migratory birds from November to March. Jackal, blue bull, mongoose, fishing cat and monkeys may also be spotted here.

A separate lake at nearby Lakh village hosts some similar species, though the relative ecology is somewhat different.

The best time to visit is December to February.
