= Tahir Hussain Siddique =

Indian politician

Tahir Hussain Siddique is an Indian politician and leader of Samajwadi Party and an ex-member of Uttar Pradesh Legislative Assembly (won on Bahujan Samaj Party's ticket). He is the ex-MLA of Kamalganj of Farrukhabad District in Uttar Pradesh.

Siddique contested from Chhibramau seat on BSP's ticket in the 2017 Uttar Pradesh Assembly election but got defeated by Archana Pandey Bharatiya Janata Party.
