= Bishungarh =

Bishungarh may refer to:

- Bishungarh, Uttar Pradesh, a village
- Bishnugarh (community development block), also called Bishungarh, in Jharkhand
