= Kannauj City railway station =

Railway station in Uttar Pradesh, India

Kannauj City Junction railway station
- Indian Railways logo

General information
- Location: NH 91, Saraimeera, Kannauj, Uttar Pradesh; India
- Elevation: 141 metres (463 ft)
- System: Indian Railways station
- Owner: Indian Railways
- Operator: North Eastern Railway
- Line: Kanpur–Delhi section
- Platforms: 2
- Tracks: 4

Construction
- Structure type: Standard (on-ground station)
- Parking: No
- Cycle facilities: No

Other information
- Status: Single diesel line
- Station code: KJNC
- Zone(s): North Eastern Railway
- Division(s): Izzatnagar
Location
- Location within India Location within Uttar Pradesh

Kannauj City railway station is a railway station in Kannauj district, Uttar Pradesh. Its code is KJNC. It will serve Kannauj city. The station has two platforms.
