= Saurikh =

- Town
- Location in Uttar Pradesh, India
- Coordinates: 27.032°N 79.489°E
- Country: India
- State: Uttar Pradesh
- District: Kannauj

Government
  - Chairman: Rahul Gupta
- Elevation: 151 m (495 ft)

Population (2011)
  - Total: 25,155

Languages Hindi
  - Official: Hindi
- Time zone: UTC+5:30 (IST)
- Postal code: 209728
- Vehicle registration: UP-74
- Website: https://www.Saurikh.in

Saurikh is a nagar panchayat in Kannauj district in the Indian state of Uttar Pradesh. Its old name was Sau-Rishi.It is located near main industrial and educational hub of Dibiyapur which is around at a distance of 55 km from the town.

== Demographics ==
Saurikh is a nagar panchayat in [Adhishashi Adhikari {EO} Shri Umesh Kumar Singh] Kannauj District of Uttar Pradesh State, India. Saurikh Tehsil Headquarters is in the town Saurikh Rural. It belongs to the Kanpur Division. As of 2001 census of India Saurikh had 5 sq/km area housing a population of 25,155. Males constitute 53% of the population and females 47%. Saurikh has an average literacy rate of 60%, more than the national average of 59.5%: male literacy is 68%, and female literacy is 56%.

== Cuisine ==
Saurikh is mainly famous for the sweet chamcham. It is popularly known all over the Kannauj District.

== Festivals and carnivals ==
=== Hindu festivals ===
According to Hindu calendar Vikram Samvat lunar calendar chaitra is considered as first month. Other Hindu festivals celebrated include Navaratri and Rama Navami,. Rakshabandhan, Deepawali, and Holi.

=== Muslim festivals ===
The Muslim calendar begins with the month of Muharram. Other Muslim festivals celebrated include Mawlid, Eid-ul-Fitr, and Bakra Eid.

=== Sikh festivals ===
The birth of the Guru Gobind Singh Ji is celebrated as Prakash Utsav in the town as it is celebrated in other parts of country by the Sikh community.

== Colleges ==
- Bahuuddasiya Sewa Shikhsa Sansthan Girls Degree College, Saurikh
- Chaudhary Jamadar Singh Mahila Degree College, Saurikh
- Ganga Singh Mahvidyalaya, Saurikh
- Cjs Mahila degree college tirwa road, Saurikh
- Rishi bhumi inter college
- Pratibha nikhar shiksha niketan inter college
- Aasha devi Mahila degree college
- Aadarsh bal vikas vidhalaya
- P.D Girls college
- Sunrise Academy Csb road
- Gyan jyoti public school
- maa saraswati vidhya mandir
- Saraswati Gyan mandir
- St Mary School
- Abrar Husain Inter College Abrar Nagar
- Madarsa Hayatul Uloom Thane ke Samne

== Nearby districts ==
- Farrukhabad 45 km
- Kannauj 48 km
- Mainpuri 55 km
- Etawah 61 km
- Auraiya 65 km
