= Tirwa Assembly constituency =

Constituency of the Uttar Pradesh legislative assembly in India

Coordinates: 26.92°N 79.73°E

Tirwa
- Constituency No. 197 for the Uttar Pradesh Legislative Assembly

Constituency details
- Country: India
- Region: North India
- State: Uttar Pradesh
- District: Kannauj
- Total electors: 380,571
- Reservation: None

Member of Legislative Assembly
- 18th Uttar Pradesh Legislative Assembly
- Incumbent Kailash Singh Rajput
- Party: Bharatiya Janta Party
- Elected year: 2022

Tirwa is a constituency of the Uttar Pradesh Legislative Assembly covering the city of Tirwa in the Kannauj district of Uttar Pradesh, India. Tirwa is one of the five assembly constituencies within Kannauj Lok Sabha constituency. Since 2008, this assembly constituency is numbered 197 amongst 403 constituencies.

Currently this constituency is represented by Bharatiya Janta Party candidate Kailash Singh Rajput who won the 2022 Uttar Pradesh Legislative Assembly election defeating Samajwadi Party candidate Anil Kumar Pal by a margin of 4608 votes.

== Members of the Legislative Assembly ==
Year	Member	Party
Till 2012 : Constituency did not exist
2012	Vijay Bahadur Pal	Samajwadi Party
2017	Kailash Singh Rajput	Bharatiya Janata Party
2022	Kailash Singh Rajput	Bharatiya Janata Party

== Election results ==
=== 2027 ===
2027 Uttar Pradesh Legislative Assembly election: Tirwa
Party	Candidate	Votes	%	±%
INDIA				
NDA				
BSP				
NOTA	None of the above			
Majority				
Turnout				
gain from		Swing		

=== 2022 ===
2022 Uttar Pradesh Legislative Assembly election: Tirwa
Party	Candidate	Votes	%	±%
BJP	Kailash Singh Rajput	106,089	44.51	−2.2
SP	Anil Kumar Pal	101,481	42.57	+7.12
BSP	Ajay Kumar	23,092	9.69	−5.21
Jan Adhikar Party	Rajendra Kumar	3,310	1.39	
NOTA	None of the above	1,128	0.47	−0.41
Majority		4,608	1.94	−9.32
Turnout		238,364	62.63	+0.69
BJP hold		Swing		

=== 2017 ===
2017 Uttar Pradesh Legislative Assembly election: Tirwa
Party	Candidate	Votes	%	±%
BJP	Kailash Singh Rajput	100,426	46.71	
SP	Vijay Bahadur Pal	76,217	35.45	
BSP	Vijay Singh	32,036	14.9	
NOTA	None of the above	1,872	0.88	
Majority		24,209	11.26	
Turnout		215,019	61.94	
BJP hold		Swing		
