= Chhibramau Assembly constituency =

Constituency of the Uttar Pradesh legislative assembly in India

Coordinates: 27.15°N 79.50°E

Chhibramau
- Constituency No. 196 for the Uttar Pradesh Legislative Assembly

Constituency details
- Country: India
- Region: North India
- State: Uttar Pradesh
- District: Kannauj
- Total electors: 4,63,433
- Reservation: None

Member of Legislative Assembly
- 18th Uttar Pradesh Legislative Assembly
- Incumbent Archana Pandey
- Party: Bharatiya Janta Party
- Elected year: 2017

Chhibramau is a constituency of the Uttar Pradesh Legislative Assembly covering the city of Chhibramau in the Kannauj district of Uttar Pradesh, India.

Chhibramau is one of five assembly constituencies in the Kannauj Lok Sabha constituency. Since 2008, this assembly constituency is numbered 196 amongst 403 constituencies.

== Members of the Legislative Assembly ==
Year	Member	Party
1957	Kotwal Singh Bhadauria	Praja Socialist Party
1962	Kotwal Singh Bhadauria	Praja Socialist Party
1967	Ram Prakash Tripathi	Bharatiya Jana Sangh
1969	Jagdishwar Dayal	Indian National Congress
1974	Ram Prakash Tripathi	Bharatiya Jana Sangh
1977	Banshgopal Chaubey	Janata Party
1980	Radhey Shyam Verma	Janata Party (Secular)
1985	Santosh Chaturvedi	Indian National Congress
1989	Kaptan Singh	Janata Dal
1991	Kaptan Singh	Janata Party
1993	Ram Prakash Tripathi	Bharatiya Janata Party
1996	Chhote Singh Yadav	Samajwadi Party
2002	Ram Prakash Tripathi	Bharatiya Janata Party
2007	Arvind Singh Yadav	Samajwadi Party
2012	Arvind Singh Yadav	Samajwadi Party
2017	Archana Pandey	Bharatiya Janata Party
2022	Archana Pandey	Bharatiya Janata Party

== Election results ==
=== 2027 ===
2027 Uttar Pradesh Legislative Assembly election: Chhibramau
Party	Candidate	Votes	%	±%
INDIA				
NDA				
BSP				
NOTA	None of the above			
Majority				
Turnout				
gain from		Swing		

=== 2022 ===
2022 Uttar Pradesh Legislative Assembly election: Chhibramau
Party	Candidate	Votes	%	±%
BJP	Archana Pandey	124,773	44.31	▲2.56
SP	Arvind Singh Yadav	123,662	43.91	▲16.87
BSP	Waheeda Bano	22,000	7.81	▼20.09
Jan Adhikar Party	Mohd Chand	4,574	1.62	
NOTA	None of the above	1,775	0.63	▼0.07
Majority		1,111	0.4	▼13.45
Turnout		281,597	60.76	▼2.9
BJP hold		Swing		

2017 Uttar Pradesh Legislative Assembly election: Chhibramau
Party	Candidate	Votes	%	±%
BJP	Archana Pandey	112,209	41.75	
BSP	Tahir Hussain Siddiqui	74,985	27.9	
SP	Arvind Singh Yadav	72,663	27.04	
NOTA	None of the above	1,861	0.7	
Majority		37,224	13.85	
Turnout		268,754	63.66	
