= Talgram =

- Town
- Location in Uttar Pradesh, India
- Country: India
- State: Uttar Pradesh
- District: Kannauj
- Elevation: 147 m (482 ft)

Population (2011)
  - Total: 11 665

Languages
  - Official: Hindi
- Time zone: UTC+5:30 (IST)

Talgram is a town and a nagar panchayat in Kannauj district in the Indian state of Uttar Pradesh.

== Geography ==
Talgram is located at 27.05°N 79.65°E. It has an average elevation of 147 metres (482 feet).

== Demographics ==
As of 2001 India census, Talgram had a population of 10,360. Males constitute 53% of the population and females 47%. Talgram has an average literacy rate of 46%, lower than the national average of 59.5%: male literacy is 53%, and female literacy is 37%. In Talgram, 19% of the population is under 6 years of age. This is one of the biggest towns in terms of population situated in Kannauj district. Talgram comes from the Kanpur division. It is a tehsil headquarter and is located 31 km west of the district headquarters of Kannauj. The nearby villages to Talgram are Atrauli (4 km), Mundala (3 km), Narmau (3 km), Gadnapur Kazi (3 km), and Jaramau Almapur (3 km). The people of Talgram primarily make their living through agriculture, cottage industries and other small scale industries. To a large extent, they are also dependent on natural and human forces. Ganga Charan Verma is one of the prominent business houses in Talgram.
