= Dr. Bhimrao Ramji Ambedkar Government Medical College, Kannauj =

Dr. Bhimrao Ramji Ambedkar Government Medical College
- Type: State Medical College
- Established: 2006; 20 years ago
- Academic affiliations: Atal Bihari Vajpayee Medical University (2021 – present); King George's Medical University (2012 – 2021)
- Principal: Dr. C. P. Pal
- Undergraduates: 100 per annum
- Postgraduates: 4 per annum
- Location: Kannauj, Uttar Pradesh, India; 26.9779°N 79.8084°E
- Campus: Kannauj
- Website: www.gmckannauj.in

Dr. Bhimrao Ramji Ambedkar Government Medical College, Kannauj, formerly Government Medical College Kannauj , is a government medical college located in Tirwa of Kannauj district, Uttar Pradesh, India.

The college has guidance and mentorship of Ganesh Shankar Vidyarthi Memorial Medical College.

== History ==
Government Medical College, Kannauj was established by SP government in 2006 as Kannauj Medical College, but classes started only in 2012 when Akhilesh Yadav become C.M. of Uttar Pradesh and the institute become recognized for 100 M.B.B.S. seats by Medical Council of India (MCI).

== Courses ==
Every year 100 students are allowed to take admission in the M.B.B.S. course by two competitive examinations. The AIPMT accounts for the filling of 15% seats and remaining 85% seats are filled through a state-level entrance examination UP-CPMT. But since 2016, NEET is the only entrance exam.

== Campus ==
The Government Medical College is situated 15 kilometers away from Kannauj at Tirwa Road of the historic city of Kannauj in U.P. The college is at about 3-hour drive from the state capital Lucknow (1.5-hours by expressway) and there is also construction of 4 lane highway along the college for better connectivity to Kannauj city. The nearest railway station is Kannauj Railway Station (KJN) and Chaudhary Charan Singh International Airport is the nearest airport to the college.

== See also ==
- Government Medical College, Jalaun
- Government Medical College, Azamgarh
- Maharshi Vashishtha Autonomous State Medical College, Basti
- Shaikh-Ul-Hind Maulana Mahmood Hasan Medical College
- Government Medical College, Banda
- Dr. Ram Manohar Lohia Institute of Medical Sciences
