= Sayyid Muhammad Qanauji =

Mir Sayyid Muhammad Qanauji was a Sufi scholar who was chaplain to the Mughal emperor Shah Jahan (1592–1666) and teacher of his son, the emperor Aurangzeb (1618–1707).

== Life ==
Sayyid Muhammad Qanauji (Note: Sayyid is an honorific title denoting males accepted as descendants of the Islamic prophet Muhammad. "Qanauji" mean "from Kannauj.) was the chaplain of the Mughal emperor Shah Jahan (1592–1666). Sayyid Qannauji and Sayyid Fazil attended Shah Jahan during the last seven years of his life, when Shah Jahan was imprisoned in the fort at Akbarabad. Sayyid and the emperor's eldest daughter Jahanara were present with Shah Jahan during his last days, providing spiritual comfort and nursing. When the emperor knew he was dying, he praised Sayyid for his faithful service and asked if there was any way he could reward him. Sayyid asked him to forgive his son Aurangzeb (1618–1707), and the emperor reluctantly agreed. After Shah Jahan's death Sayyid Muhammad helped prepare the body for burial, which was done with little ceremony since Aurangzeb had not ordered a state funeral.

Sayyid Qannauji taught Aurangzeb, and a letter written for him in Arabic by Aurangzeb has survived. Even after Aurangzeb ascended the throne, he would meet with Sayyid three times a week. Sayyid was a disciple of Muhibullah Allahabadi. It is said that Aurangzeb summoned Sayyid and asked him to explain how some of Muhibbullah's statements could be reconciled with Sharia, or he would burn Muhibullah's writings. Sayyid replied that he could only explain Muhibullah's words when he reached a similar spiritual status, which was far above his present condition. He also said that the emperor had enough fire in his kitchen and did not have to use a poor man's fire. (Note: Another account says that when Sayyid was asked to explain the controversial passages in Muhibbullah's Taswiyya he denied having been connected with Muhibbullah. It was an ascetic named Shaikh Muhammadi who made the reply to Aurangzib.)

Sayyid Qannauji is said to have collaborated with another of Aurangzeb's tutors, Mulla Abu'l Wa-iz, in compiling the Fatawa-e-Alamgiri, a manual of Islamic jurisprudence the emperor commissioned in the late 1660s. Sayyid was deputy to Qazi Abdul Wahhab in marrying Aurangzeb 's son Prince Azam on 21 December 1668. He was a witness to the marriage of Prince Muhammad Sultan on 16 December 1672. Aurangzib appointed Sayyid Sharif Khan, son of Sayyid Qannauji, the Karori-i ganj (censor) of the imperial camp and collector of jizya for the four provinces of the Deccan. Sharif Khan replaced Qazi Muhammad Husain, after the death of latter.

== Sources ==
- Baḳhsh, Muhammad Faiz; Hoey, William (1888). Memoirs of Delhi and Faizábád: Being a Translation of the Táríḳh Farahbaḳhsh of Muhammad Faiz Baḳhsh from the Original Persian. Government Press, North-western Provinces and Oudh.
- Eraly, Abraham (2000). Emperors of the Peacock Throne: The Saga of the Great Mughals. Penguin Books India. ISBN 978-0-14-100143-2.
- Faruqui, Munis D. (2012-08-27). The Princes of the Mughal Empire, 1504-1719. Cambridge University Press. ISBN 978-1-107-02217-1.
- Ghauri, Iftikhar Ahmad (1964). War of Succession Between the Sons of Shah Jahan, 1657-1658. Publishers United.
- Hanif, N. (2000). Biographical Encyclopaedia of Sufis: South Asia. Sarup & Sons. ISBN 978-81-7625-087-0.
- Pakistan Journal of History and Culture. National Institute of Historical and Cultural Research. 1984.
- Rahman Faruqi, Shamsur (September 2007). "Urdu and Persian Literature in Allahabad". Columbia.edu.
- Rapson, Edward James; Haig, Wolseley; Burn, Richard; Dodwell, Henry Herbert; Wheeler, Mortimer, eds. (1937). The Cambridge History of India: The Mughul period. University Press.
- Saqi Mustad Khan (1947). Maasir-i-Alamgiri A History of the Emperor Aurangzib Alamgir. Calcutta: Royal Asiatic Society of Bengal.
