= Muhibullah Allahabadi =

Sufi poet and scholar

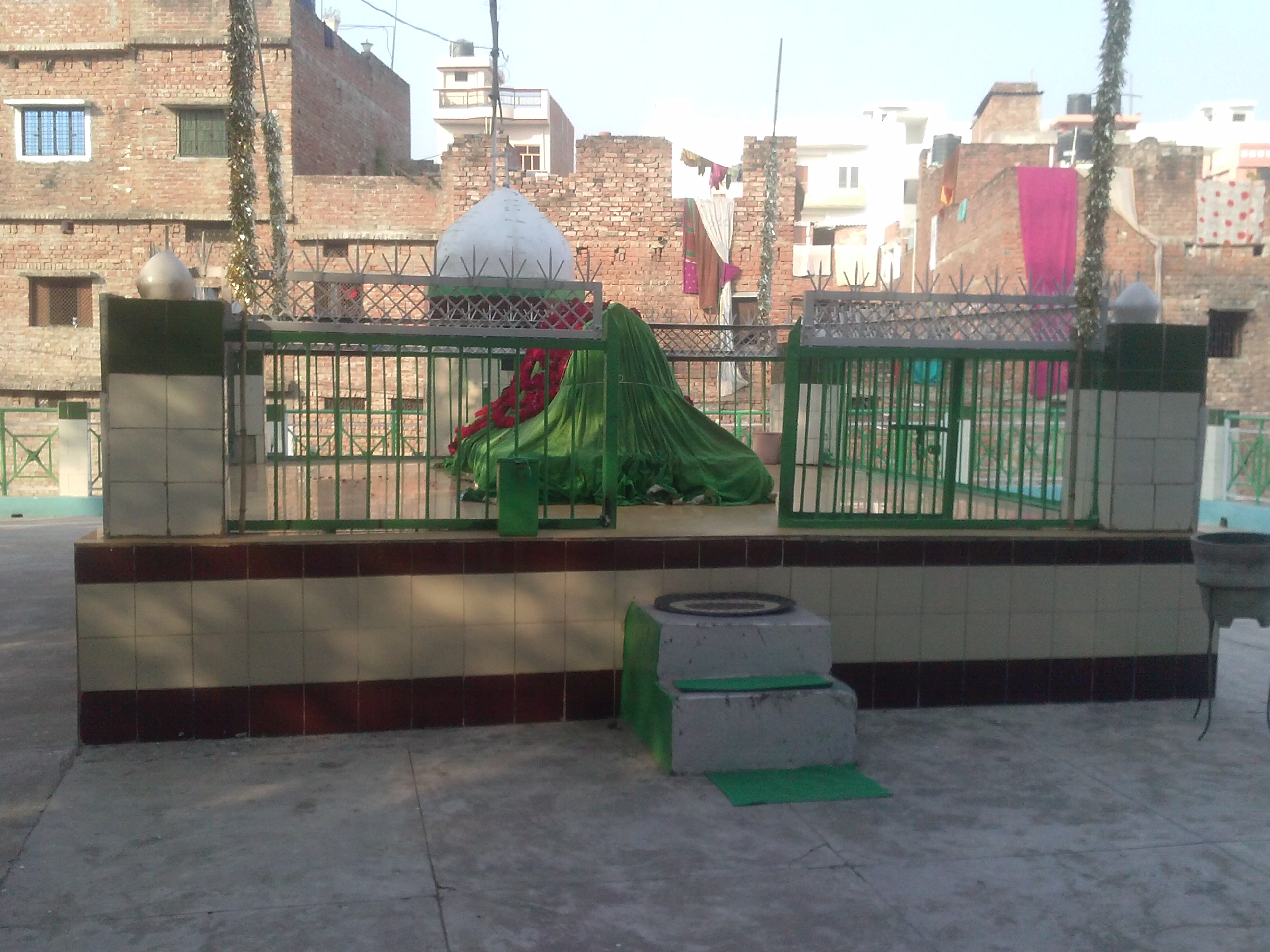
- Muhibbullah Allahabadi"s Mausoleum
- Born: Muhibullah bin Mubariz; 1587; Near Khairabad, Sitapur, Mughal Empire
- Died: July 30, 1648 (aged 60–61); Allahabad
- Resting place: Dayra shah muhibullah, Allahabad
- Other name: Shaikh-e-Kabeer
- Occupation: Sufi scholar
- Known for: Doctrine of Wahdat al-Wujud
- Predecessor: Abu Said Gangohi
- Successor: Qazi Ghasi, Mohammadi Fayyaz, Sayyid Muhammad Qanauji, Mohsin Fani Shah Saif Ullah Shah Muqarrab ullah

Muhibullah Allahabadi, or Muhibb ullah Ilahabadi (Urdu: محب اللہ الہ آبادی; मुहिबउल्लाह इलाहाबादी 1587–30 July 1648) was a Sufi saint and scholar who was active in Allahabad in northern India during the reign of the Mughul emperor Shah Jahan. He is noted as a leading proponent of the Sufi doctrine of Wahdat al-Wujud, sometimes called "Oneness of Being".

== Life ==
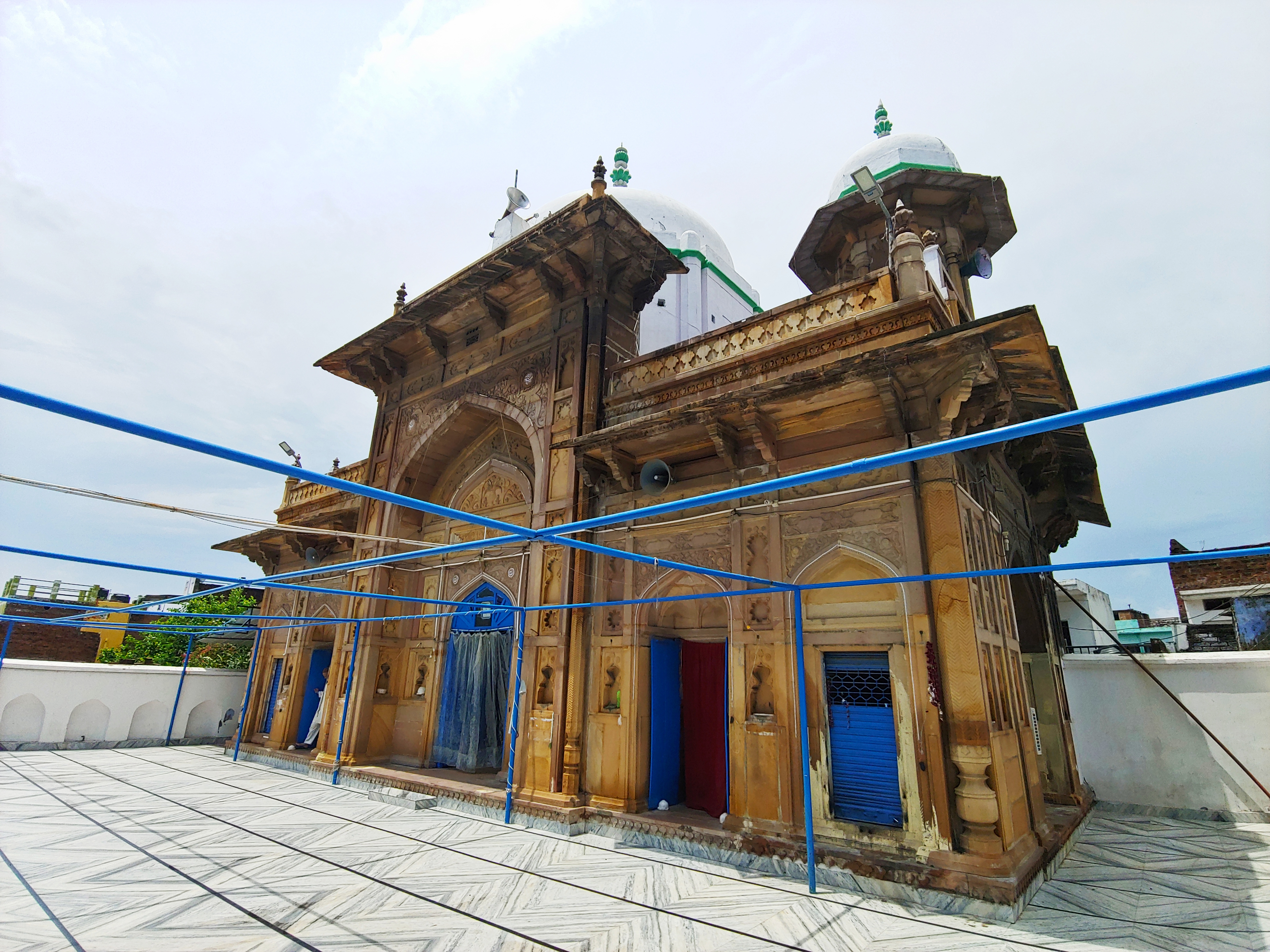
Shahi Masjid

Muhibullah was born in 1587in India. He was a descendant of Fariduddin Ganjshakar. His home was in Sadarpur in Awadh. There he compiled a commentary in Arabic on Ibn Arabi's Fusus ul-Hikam. He was initiated into the Sabiriya branch of the Chishti Order of Sufis with the help of Shaikh Abu Said Gangohi, and visited major Chishti places of pilgrimage and centers before settling in Allahabad in 1628, where he spent the rest of his life. He was active during the reign of the Mogul emperor Shah Jahan (r. 1628–58). (Note: The emperor Shah Jahan once asked Muhibullah to visit him, quoting the saying "Obey God and obey the Prophet and all those among you who are in command". Muhibbullah wrote a letter of polite refusal in which he said "How can one reach the third stage when one is not able to fulfill the obligations needed for the first two stages?".) Muhibullah founded the Indo-Islamic literary culture in Allahabad, with his many writings on obscure Sufi topics in both Persian and Arabic.

In Muhibullah's view social relationships should be guided by the unity of Being. He was the preceptor of Shah Jahan's son, prince Dara Shikoh. In response to an inquiry from the prince he wrote that the state should not make a distinction between Muslims and Hindus, since God did not discriminate between his creations. God had sent Muhammad as Rahmat al Alameen, mercy for all of creation, not only for Muslims. Many devotees visited Muhibullah's Khanqah, including both Moslems and Hindus. Muhibullah thought that mystic knowledge could be obtained from Hindus, and quoted the Hindu theory of cosmogony in a letter, but seems to have had no more than a very superficial understanding of Hindu mysticism.

Muhibullah followed the teachings of Ibn Arabi (1165–1240), the great Sufi poet and mystic from Andalusia, and was himself called Shaikh-e Kabir (the great master). Ibn Arabi had formulated the most advanced formulation of the Tawhid wajudi (Wahdat al-Wujud) doctrine, a fundamental Sufist doctrine. In the Sufi interpretation of the doctrine the face of God is seen everywhere, but that does not mean that everything that exists is an aspect of Divine unity. Muhibullah Allahabadi strongly supported the Tawhid wajudi doctrine, and was called Sheikh Ibn Arabi II because of his depth of understanding of the doctrine. Muhibullah wrote several books, most notably Taswiyah, in which he ardently defended the doctrine. The doctrine was highly fashionable during Akbar's reign (1556–1605), because Sheikh Tajuddin Zakaria Ajodhini used to talk of it privately to Akbar.

Muhibullah considered that the works of Ibn Arabi should not be interpreted either literally or metaphysically, and had more respect for Ibn Arabi's critics such as Shaikh Ala ud-Daula Simnani and Mir Saiyid Muhammad Gesu Daraz than for commentators who simply glossed over Ibn Arabi's work. He was opposed by Mulla Mahmud Jaunpuri (of Jaunpur) and his followers who attacked Sufism in general and emphasized the importance of rational thought as opposed to dogma and mysticism. Some ulama said that his views about Appearance and Reality were heretical, and Muhibullah should not be considered a Muslim. A fatwa was issued for his execution, which was only averted with considerable difficulty.

Muhibullah Allahabadi died on 32 July 1648.

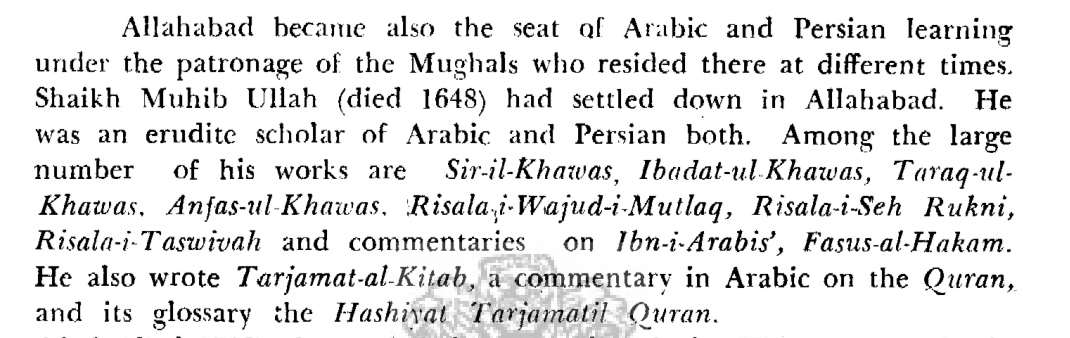
Uttar Pradesh District Gazetteers: Allahabad. 1968

== Legacy ==
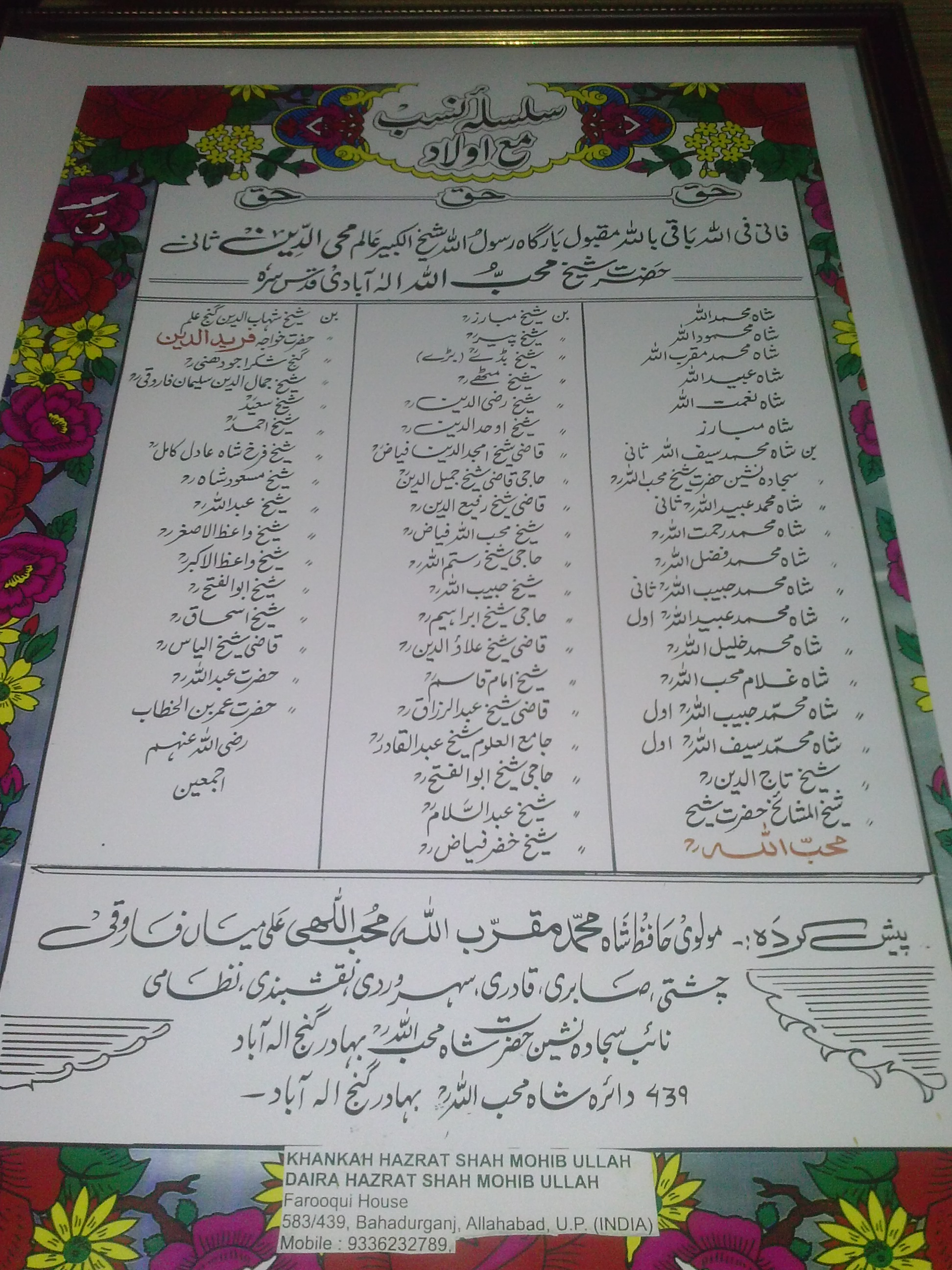
Ancestry Muhibbullah Allahabadi

Aurangzeb (r. 1658–1707) may have suspected the orthodoxy of the doctrine of wahdat-ul wajud propounded by Shah Muhibbullah. Aurangzeb threatened to burn his book in which he called Gabriel a hidden spiritual power in the Prophet rather than a winged angel. It is said that Aurangzeb summoned Muhibbullah's disciple Sayyid Muhammad Qannauji, and asked him to explain how some of Muhibbullah's statements could be reconciled with Sharia. Qannauji replied that he could only explain Muhibbullah's words when he reached a similar spiritual status, which was far above his present condition. He also said that the emperor had enough fire in his kitchen and did not have to use a poor man's fire.

The important shrine of Daira Shah Hujjatulla in Allahabad was founded by Muhibullah. Sheikh Mohsin Fani of Kashmir, a disciple of Molla Serf, celebrated Muhibullah in one of his poems. Muhibullah had invested Mohisan Fani in the sacred costume of the Dervish. Muhibullah was considered an important saint by the Sabiriya order of Sufis, founded by Alauddin Sabir Kaliyari. In the early 20th century the month of Rajab was treated as a time for holiness and festivities in Allahabad, since it was not just the month of the Prophet's ascension but also the month of Muhibullah's urs.

== Followers ==
Prominent followers of Muhibullah included:

- Qazi Ghasi
- Mohammadi Fayyaz
- Sayyid Muhammad Qanauji
- Abdul Rashid
- Qazi Muhammad Yusuf Salis Bilgrami

Qazi Mohammad Yusuf Salis Bilgrami (d. unknown) was a Sufi disciple of shiekh Muhibullah Ilahabadi, the friend of Mughal Royal Dara Shikoh. His father, Qazi Abul Makarim was a learned Man and served as a Qazi of Bilgram, his home- town in Awadh. Initially Qazi Muhammad Yusuf Salis was Faujdar in the Province of Malwah, but later he renounced worldly career as it was incompatible with his Sufi way of life. Prince Dara Shikoh formulated sixteen questions of exploring fundamental nature exploring the entire discipline of Sufism and sent them to Shiekh Muhibullah Allahabadi. At his teacher’s indication, Qazi Muhammad Yusuf Salis drafted their answers for submission to the Prince, naming the work: Hadyat us Sultaniyah

- Ahmad

== Writings ==
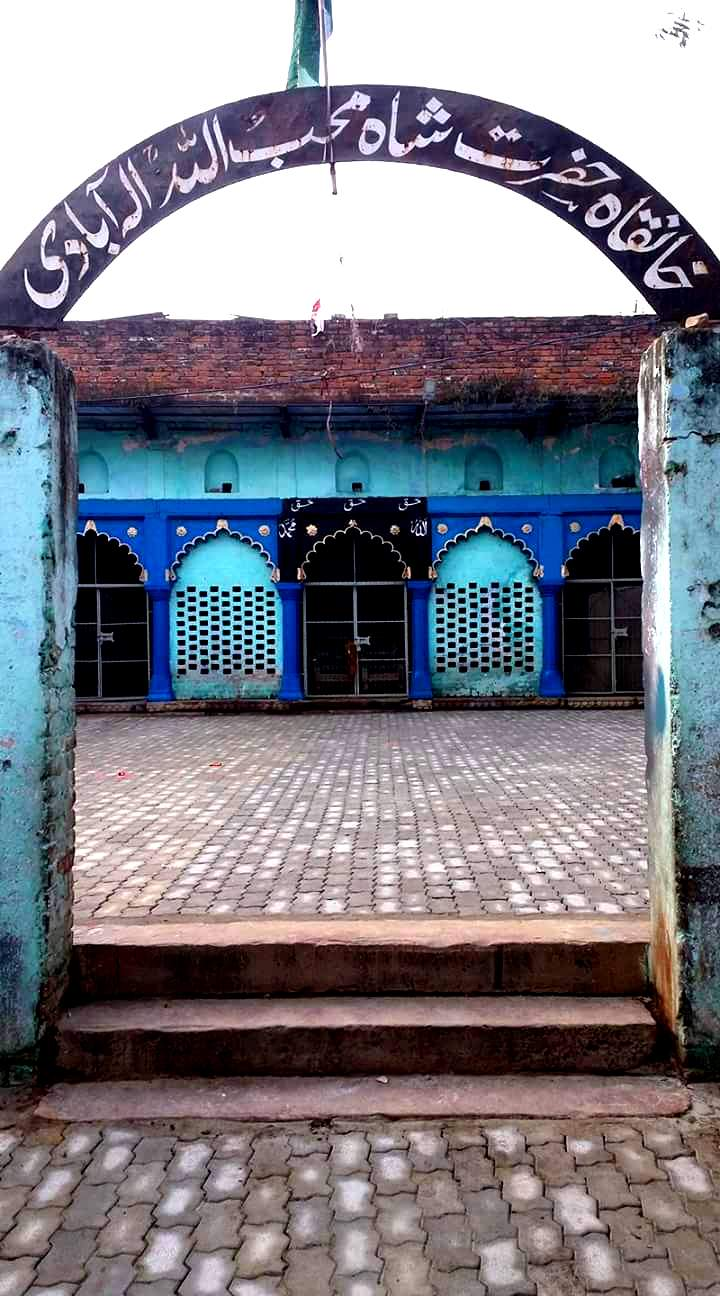
Khanqah Hazrat Shah Muhibbullah Allahabadi Bahadurganj Allahabad

A great many of Muhibullah's letters have been preserved, including a letter from Dara Shikoh (1615–59) with a list of questions on esoteric Sufi questions, and the detailed reply from Muhibullah. Surviving writings by Muhibullah include:

- Sharh-i-Fūsūs ul-Hikam, an abstruse commentary in simple Persian on Ibn Arabi's Fūsūs ul-Hikam
- Ibādat ul Khawāss, code of prayers leading to spiritual discipline
- Haft-Akhām, discussion of the seven points leading to spiritual discipline
- Ghāyat-ul-Ghāyāt
- Taswiyah (Equalization), defense of the doctrine of Tawhid wajudi
- Miftāh ul-'ashiqin, often quoted as the sayings of Nasīr ud-Din Mahmūd Chirāgh-i-Dehli.

Other surviving writings are:

- Tarjamat al-kitāb, Sufi commentary on the Koran
- Anfās al-khawāșș, mystical theories based on the lives and sayings of prophets and saints

== Urs ==
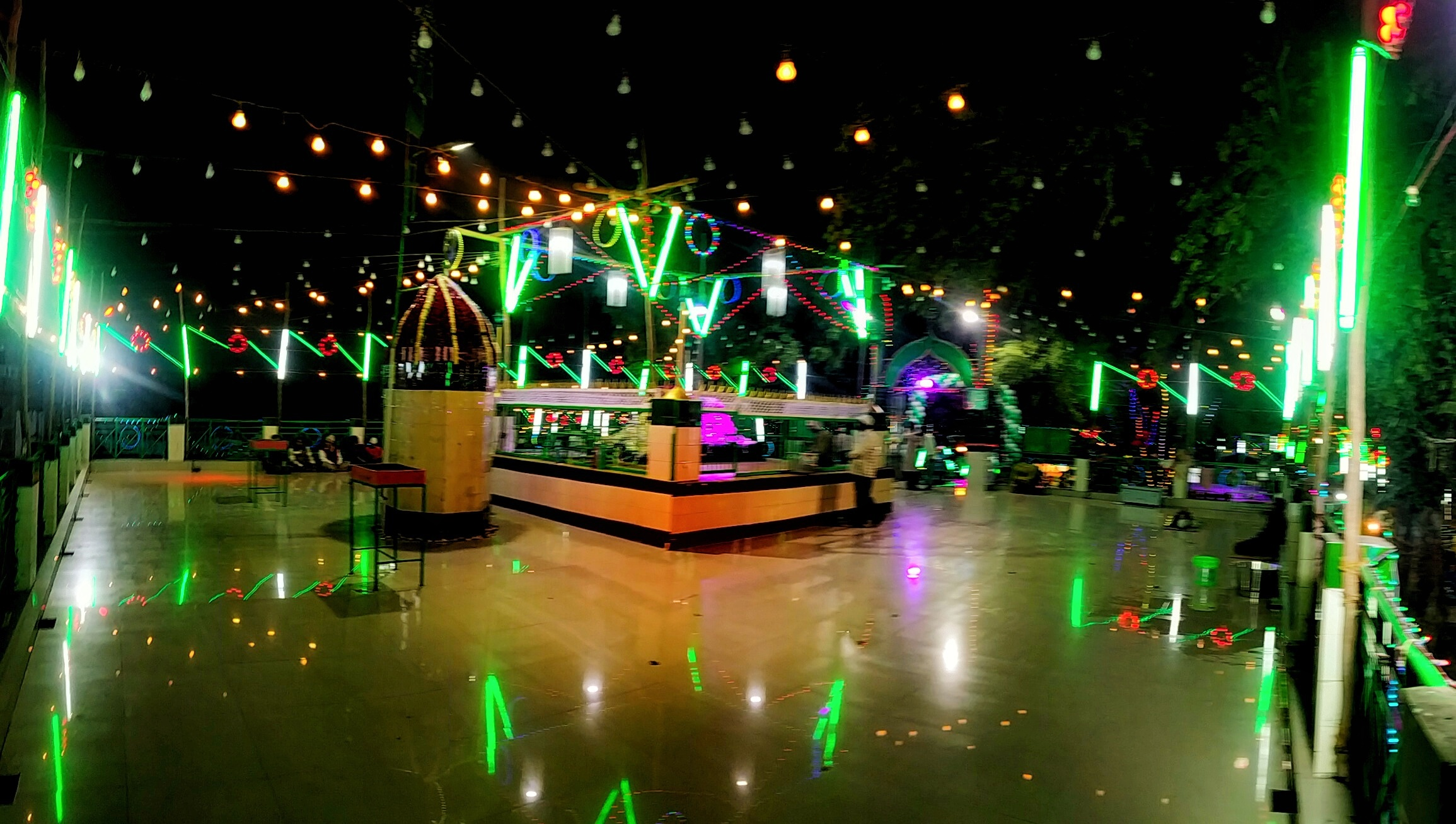
Dargah of Muhibbullah Allahabadi

The Urs (death anniversary) of Shah Muhibbullah Allahabadi is celebrated at the Dargah shareef Kydganj Dargah And Bahadurganj Khanqah on the 8th-9th of Rajab.

== Sources ==
- Brill, E.J. (1990). "Wahdat al-Wujud: a fundamental doctrine in Sufism". The Encyclopaedia of Islam. Vol. 10 "Tasawwaf". Leiden: Luzac & Co.
- Clarke, Peter (2002-06-01). The World's Religions: Islam. Routledge. ISBN 978-1-134-93195-8.
- Dalal, Roshen (2010). The Religions of India: A Concise Guide to Nine Major Faiths. Penguin Books India. ISBN 978-0-14-341517-6.
- Dehlvi, Sadia (2012-09-05). Sufism: Heart of Islam. HarperCollins Publishers. ISBN 978-93-5029-448-2.
- Farooqi, F. U. (1999). Lucknow: A Centre of Arabic and Islamic Studies During the Nineteenth Century. Falāḥ-E-Dārain Trust, Publication Wing. p. 231.
- Farooqui, Salma Ahmed (2011). A Comprehensive History of Medieval India: From Twelfth to the Mid-Eighteenth Century. Pearson Education India. ISBN 978-81-317-3202-1.
- Gooptu, Nandini (2001-07-05). The Politics of the Urban Poor in Early Twentieth-Century India. Cambridge University Press. ISBN 978-0-521-44366-1.
- Hadi, Nabi (1995). "Muhhibb ullah Ilahabadi, Shaikh". Dictionary of Indo-Persian Literature. Abhinav Publications. ISBN 978-81-7017-311-3.
- Mohammada, Malika (2007-01-01). The Foundations of the Composite Culture in India. Aakar Books. ISBN 978-81-89833-18-3.
- Ouseley, Gore (1845). "Note sur le veritable auteur du Dabistan". Journal asiatique (in French). Société asiatique.
- Rafiabadi, Hamid Naseem (2005-01-01). Saints and Saviours of Islam. Sarup & Sons. ISBN 978-81-7625-555-4.
- Faruqi, Shamsur Rahman (September 2007). "Urdu and Persian Literature in Allahabad". Columbia.edu.
- Schimmel, Annemarie (1980). Islam in the Indian Subcontinent. BRILL. ISBN 90-04-06117-7.
