= Bishungarh, Uttar Pradesh =

Bishungarh
- Village
- Location in Uttar Pradesh, India Bishungarh (India)
- Coordinates: 27.34°N 79.24°E
- Country: India
- State: Uttar Pradesh
- District: Kannauj

Government
  - Body: Gram panchayat
  - Member of Parliament: Smt. Dimpal Yadav

Population (2011)
  - Total: 7,400

Languages
  - Official: Hindi
- Time zone: UTC+5:30 (IST)
- PIN: 209720
- Member of Legislative Assembly from Chhibramau: Smt. Archna Pandey
- Member Zila Panchayat: Smt.Sushma Sisodia
- District Magistrate: Mr. Jagdeesh Chandra

Bishungarh, also known as Vishungarh, is a village in the Indian state of Uttar Pradesh (UP). It is located in the Chhibramau tehsil of Kannauj district.

== History ==
=== Chaudhary Estate ===
Bishungarh is a chieftaincy of Tiwari Brahmins of Kannaujia division. The first known ancestor of family was one Biharilal Tiwari Who founded the village of Biharipur in sakatpur. His great-grandson Hanuman Prasad had four sons; and the elder Mahanand entered the service of the officer (Chakladar) who then Governed Etawah and neighbouring districts Mahanand had in 1777 risen to the position of contractor for the Revenue of Sakatpur and Etawah Parganas: A few years later He was ordered by Governor Alamis Ali Khan to seize and imprison a defaulter- Landholder, Chaudhary of Lachhiram, a Bais Rajput of Talgram. Mahananda not only Imprisoned Lachhiram, but forced him to execute a deed that transferred the man The title of Choudhary to himself. In this way Mahanand's family received this title. Mahananda's family have ever been enjoying continuously since then. His brother Udaichand, who 'succeeded his post turned his hand against other clans.He expelled the Gaur Rajputs from two villages, which he made over to the Birpur Ahirs,

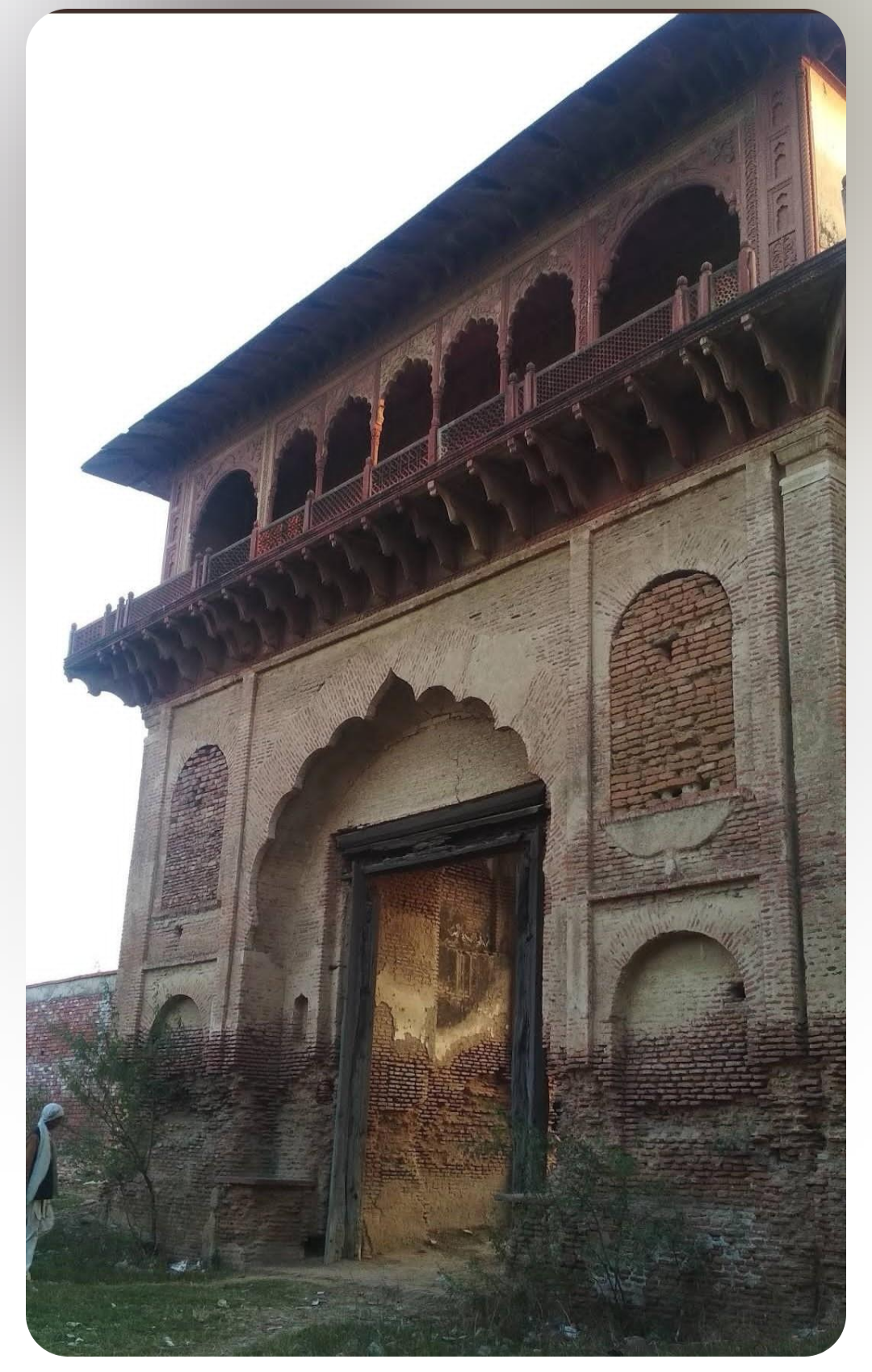
Bishungarh fort Tripathi jagir

Tho local Brahmin Chaudharis were allowed to retain only what land they themselves cultivated; and the Rur Baises lost two of their villages.

Lastly, the Ahirs, who had begun to prove troublesome, were ejected from ono of the villages lately given them, their castles being everywhere demolished.

== Politics ==
The Bishungarh village falls under the Assembly constithency of Kannauj. Both Assembly and Loksabha constituencies are in the unreserved category.

== Notable locations ==
- Aryavart Gramin Bank

== Location ==
Bishungarh is 8 km from Chhibramau, which can be accessed via National Highway 91 (Delhi – Etah – Kannauj - Kanpur).

== Agriculture ==
Potato, sugarcane, and tilhan (an oilseed) are the main agriculture products in the area.
