= Attar =

Types of essential oils

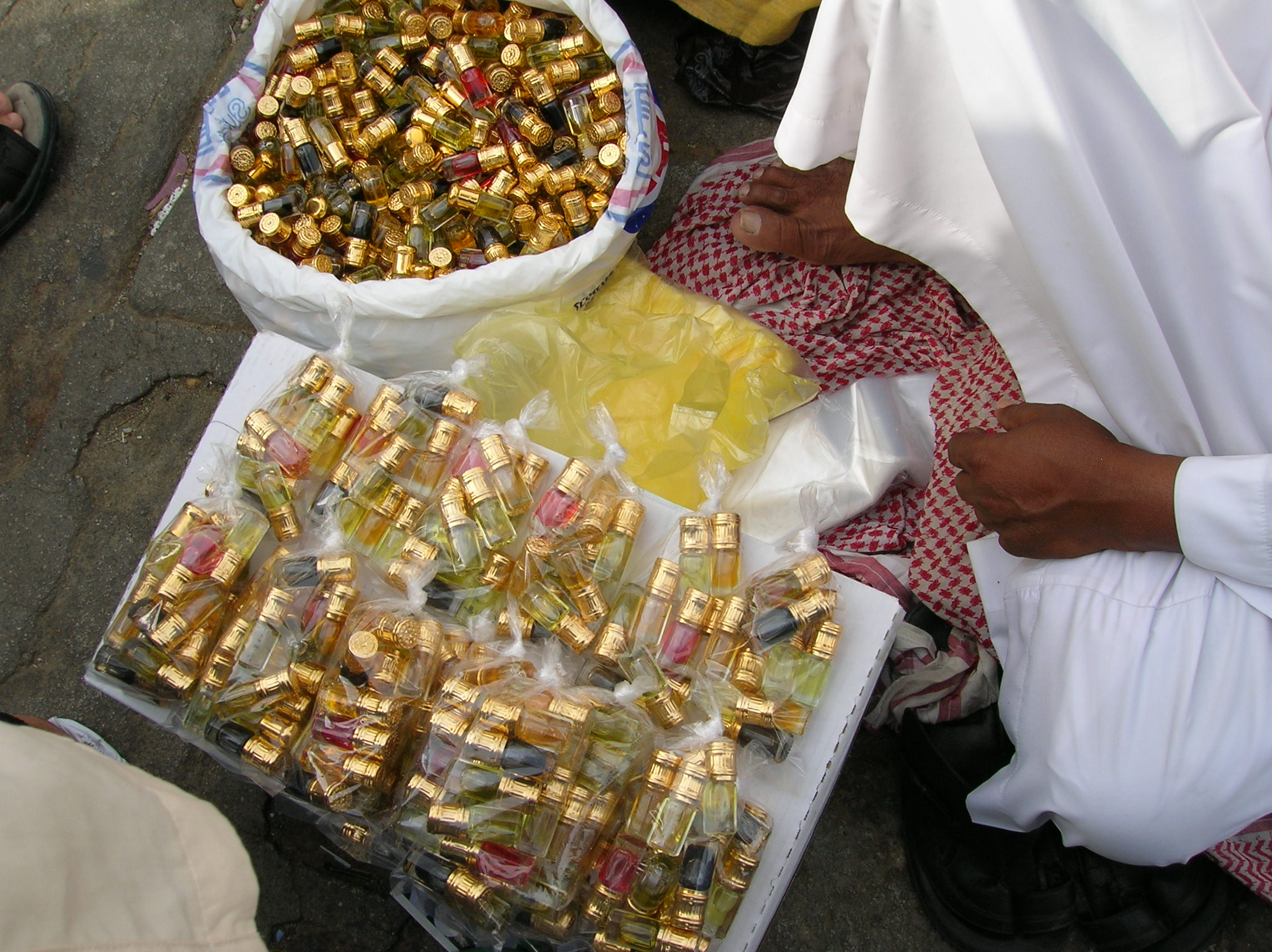
Attar being sold at the top of Jabale Rahmah, Mecca.

Attar perfumes displayed for sale at a shop near Charminar, Hyderabad, India.

Attar, also known as ittar, is an essential oil derived from botanical or other natural sources. Most commonly these oils are extracted via hydrodistillation or steam distillation. Attar can also be expressed by chemical means but generally natural perfumes which qualify as attars are distilled with water. The oils are generally distilled into a wood base such as sandalwood and then aged. The aging period can last from one to ten years depending on the botanicals used and the results desired. Technically attars are distillates of flowers, herbs, spices and other natural materials such as baked soil over sandalwood oil/liquid paraffins using hydrodistillation technique involving a still and a receiving vessel.

== History ==
Attar is a fragrance that uses oil as its base, in contrast to the alcohol of perfumes. It is made using the deg-bhapka method by "digahas (master distillers), using copper vessels, bamboo pipes, clay seals, and steam distillation to extract floral essence into oil." Attar is found in India, particularly in the cities of Kannauj (in Bara Bazar), Delhi (in Matia Mahal Bazar), and Mumbai (in Bhendi Bazaar).

Alcohol free fragrances have been made in India and Egypt for over 3000 years. Throughout history, Indian fragrances and perfumes were traded along the "Silk Road". Alcohol free fragrances have deep religious and historical meaning, in both Hindu and Buddhist writing. Regarded as luxurious item used for gifting and religious ceremonies. India was a key player on the international stage, the scents of its huge, expansive land taken into homes across the globe. When the fragrances reached the Middle East, the Hindi-Urdu words 'attar' (अत्तर, عطر) or 'ittar' (इत्तर, عطر) are believed to have been given to the fragrances.

In India, Abul Fazal Faizee gives a verdict of how Attar was used to making the Mabkhara-incense-burner. The barks that were used in Akbar's time, according to Faizee, were aloe, sandalwood, and cinnamon. Resins such as myrrh and frankincense, animal substances such as musk and anbar, were used along with roots of special trees and a few other spices. The ruler of the Indian region of Awadh, Ghazi-ud-Din Haidar Shah used to prepare fountains of attar around his bedroom. These fountains would create a very pleasant fragrant and romantic atmosphere by functioning continuously. In the medieval Indian era, Samamme attar was discovered by Shah Jahan and Rooh Gulab attar was discovered by Nur Jahan.

The Egyptians were famous for producing perfumes throughout the ancient world. They were formulated from plants and flowers before they could be added to other oils. It was later refined and developed by al-Shaykh al-Rais, a renowned physician who made a distinctive type of aromatic product. He was referred to as Abu Ali Sina. He was among the first people to come up with the technique of distillation of roses and other plant fragrances. Liquid perfumes used to be a mixture of oil and crushed herbs until his discovery where he first experimented with roses.

In Yemen, a special variety of attar was introduced by Arwa al-Sulayhi, the Yemeni Queen. This type of attar was prepared from mountainous flowers and given as a gift to the monarchs of Arabia.

== Uses and types ==
Attars are generally classified based on their perceived effect on the body. 'Warm' attars, such as musk, amber and kesar (saffron), are used in winter, as they are believed to increase body temperature. Likewise, 'cool' attars, such as rose, jasmine, khus, kewra and mogra, are used in summer for their perceived cooling effect on the body.

Although attars are mostly used as a perfume, they are also used for medicinal and aphrodisiacal purposes.

=== Musk ===
Musk is a class of aromatic compound produced by a male Siberian musk deer, a rare species deer found in the Himalayas. The substance used in creating musk can be produced only by a mature male musk deer, and the process of acquiring it involves killing the deer. As such, its demand has led to the endangerment of most musk deer species, which in turn has aided the rise of synthetic musk, known as 'white musk'.

Natural musk is commonly mixed with medicines and confectionary. Purported medicinal benefits range from working as an antivenom and strengthening organs.

== Musk Tahara ==
Musk Tahara is a type of personal fragrance traditionally used in the Middle East and the wider Muslim world as a type of grooming and ritual practices. Modern versions are primarily made with synthetic white musk rather than natural animal-derived musk. It is typically applied to the body for its scent.

=== Ambergris ===
Ambergris, also known as Anbar, is a waxy substance excreted from sperm whales and retrieved from beaches and the sea. It is thought to have been used by humans for at least 1,000 years, and has a musky aroma. Ambrein, an alcohol used as a scent preservative, is extracted from ambergris.

== Spirituality and religion ==
Hinduism and Buddhism use these scents through household and temple offerings. Some Sufis sects in Islam also adopted use of scents from local religions and use them in their shrines. Attars are commonly used within the incense and food used as offerings.

== See also ==
- Bṛhat Saṃhitā
- Charaka Samhita
- Kannauj Perfume
- List of essential oils
- Synthetic musk
- Varahamihira
