= Gursahaiganj =

- Town
- Location in Uttar Pradesh, India
- Coordinates: 27.12°N 79.72°E
- Country: India
- State: Uttar Pradesh
- District: Kannauj

Government
  - Type: local government

Area
  - Total: 3 km^{2} (1.2 sq mi)
- Elevation: 146 m (479 ft)

Population (2011)
  - Total: 46,060
  - Density: 15,000/km^{2} (40,000/sq mi)

Languages
  - Official: Hindi
- Time zone: UTC+5:30 (IST)
- Postal code: 209722
- Vehicle registration: UP-74

Gursahaiganj is a town and a municipal board in Kannauj district in the states and territories of India.

== Demographics ==
As of 2011 India census, Gursahaiganj had a population of 46,060. Males constitute 24,282 of the population and females 21,778. Gursahaiganj has an average literacy rate of 57%, progressive results in comparison to the 2001 census: male literacy is 57%, and female literacy is 43%. In Gursahaiganj, 15% of the population is under 0-6 years of age.
