= Tirwa, Kannauj =

Tirwa
- Town
- Location in Uttar Pradesh, India
- Coordinates: 26.963333°N 79.792222°E
- Country: India
- State: Uttar Pradesh
- District: Kannauj

Government
  - Type: local
  - Body: nagar panchayat

Population (2017)
  - Total: 30,000

कन्नैजिया भाषा
  - Official: Hindi
- Time zone: UTC+5:30 (IST)

Tirwa is a town (nagar panchayat) in Kannauj district in the Indian state of Uttar Pradesh.

The road to the Lakh-Bahosi bird sanctuary goes through Tirwa. It is situated on the National Highway 91A.

== Demographics ==
As of the 2001 Indian census, Tirwa had a population of 20,229. Males constitute 53% of the population and females 47%. Tirwa has an average literacy rate of 67%, higher than the national average of 59.5%: male literacy is 73%, and female literacy is 61%. In Tirwa, 15% of the population is under 6 years of age.
