= Kannauj Perfume =

Perfume from Uttar Pradesh

- Geographical indication
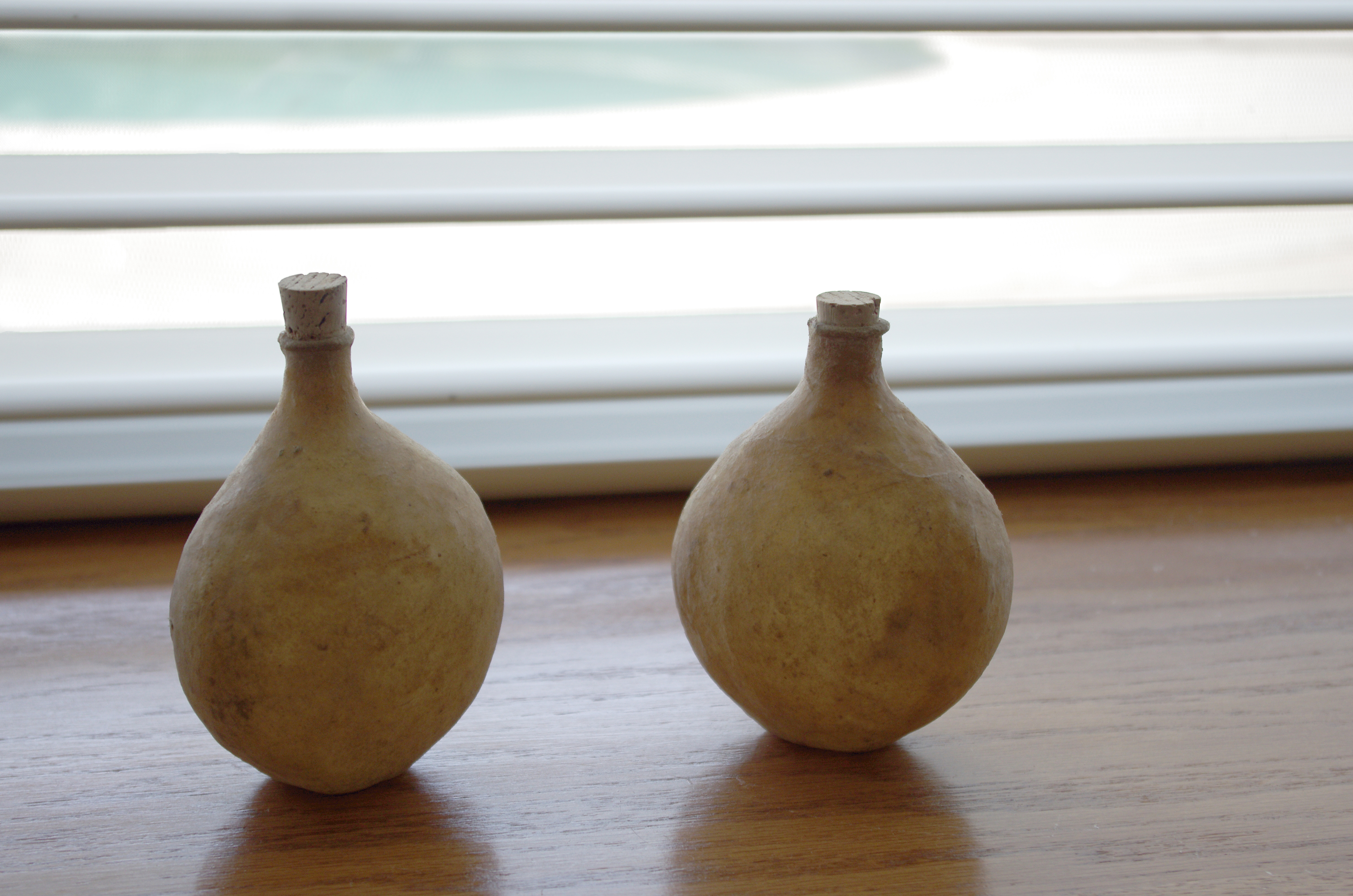
- Camel skin perfume bottles from Kannauj. The bottles are for aging the perfume.
- Alternative names: Ittar
- Description: Kannauj Perfume in Uttar Pradesh
- Type: Manufactured
- Area: Kannauj, Uttar Pradesh
- Country: India
- Registered: 2013–2014
- Material: Flowers, herbs, spices

Kannauj Perfume, also known as Kannauj Ittar, is a traditional Indian perfume made in the city of Kannauj in Uttar Pradesh.

It has been protected under the Geographical indication (GI) of the Agreement on Trade-Related Aspects of Intellectual Property Rights (TRIPS) agreement. Kannauj Perfume is listed as item 157 of the GI Act 1999, which was passed by the Government of India.

Kannauj's perfume sector has a storied history. Due to the role of perfume production in Kannauj, the city is known as "the perfume capital of India". Additionally, one writer said that "Kannauj is to India what Grasse is to France". An expert stated that "Kannauj has been the perfumery town of the country for thousands of years".

The skills used to manufacture the perfume have been passed down through successive generations. In describing this process, one artisan said, "My family has been working in this field since three centuries and my son is the 30th generation".

The perfume is made from flowers and natural resources. Musk, camphor, saffron and other aromatic substances are also used in its production. Flowers like white jasmine and plants such as vetiver are used for summer varieties, while soil is used for a monsoon variety, called Mitti attar. The smell of Mitti attar resembles petrichor, the loamy smell of a first rain. Heena attar and musk attar are winter varieties.

The perfume does not usually contain alcohol or other chemicals. Perfume made from rose is more potent, while attar made from sandalwood oil lasts for a long time. The typical creation process of a small bottle takes roughly 15 days.

Kannauj perfume has reached both local and international markets. Around 20 companies export to foreign countries from North America and Europe, to the Middle East, Central Asia and Oceania.

== See also ==
- List of Geographical Indications in India
- Ittar
