= Biwanr =

- shifting cultivation in Uttar Pradesh
- Location in Uttar Pradesh, India
- Coordinates: 25.75°N 79.93°E
- Country: India
- State: Uttar Pradesh
- District: Hamirpur
- Elevation: 123 m (404 ft)

Population (2011)
  - Total: 10,386

Languages
  - Official: Hindi
- Time zone: UTC+5:30 (IST)
- PIN: 210501
- Vehicle registration: UP91

Biwanr is a town in Hamirpur District of Uttar Pradesh, India.

== Geography ==
Biwanr is located approximately 400 km from Delhi, the national capital.

== Demographic view ==
As of 2011 India census, Biwanr had a population of 10386. Males constituted 5643 of the population and females 4743. Bewar has an average literacy rate of 64.3%.

== Education ==
Hiranand inter college and Hiranand pg college, bewar, hamirpur
