= Archana Pandey =

Indian politician (born 1960)

Minister of State for Mining, Excise and Prohibition Government of Uttar Pradesh
- In office 19 March 2017 – 20 August 2019
- Chief Minister: Yogi Adityanath

Personal details
- Born: 5 June 1960 (age 66) Uttar Pradesh, India
- Party: Bhartiya Janta Party
- Education: M.A.(English),1980, University of Allahabad
- Profession: Politician

Archana Pandey (born 5 June 1960) is an Indian politician from Uttar Pradesh. She is MLA in 17th Legislative Assembly of Uttar Pradesh and former Minister of State for Mining, Excise, and Prohibition (2017–19). She is a daughter of former Bhartiya Janta Party's MP, MLA (4 times) and former General Secretary and Vice-President of Bharatiya Janata Party state unit of Uttar Pradesh Late Shree Ram Prakash Tripathi Ji.

She has won the Chhibramau constituency of Uttar Pradesh legislative assembly. The fight of Chhibramau was between Archana Pandey (BJP), Tahir Hussain Siddiqui (BSP) and Arvind Singh (SP). She defeated her nearest competitor Tahir Hussain Siddiqui by 37,224 votes.

== Political life ==
Initially she worked in public as a basic social worker.

- 2017: She was elected as Member of Legislative Assembly of Uttar Pradesh from Chhibramau (Vidhan Sabha constituency) as Bharatiya Janta Party candidate. She got 11209 votes in this election
- March 19, 2017: became State Minister in the cabinet of Yogi Adityanath

She got the ministries of Mining, Excise, Prohibition.

Archana Pandey has around 25 years of experience in social works and active politics. She has participated in MLA election from Bharatiya Janata Party (BJP) at Chhibaramau in 2012. She was the former member of consumer forum of six years, ex member of Samaj Kalyan Board (UP), and previous director of Gramin Bank. She is a member of working committee from BJP Uttar Pradesh. She remained a Member of National Council BJP two times and secretary of Mahila Morcha BJP for Uttar Pradesh three times.

== Minister of State – Uttar Pradesh Government ==
Archana Pandey, the member of BJP, is an MLA from Vidhan Sabha constituency of Uttar Pradesh. She won the Chhibramau constituency by getting around 112209 votes in assembly election, Kannauj District of Uttar Pradesh. Tahir Hussain Siddiqui has received 74985 votes and Arvind Singh got 72663 votes in 2017 Uttar Pradesh Assembly elections. Total 37224 voters have used their voting rights to make Archana Pandey the winner in 2017 assembly elections from the seat of Uttar Pradesh.

On 20 August 2019, she resigned from the State Minister post along with four other members of the cabinet.
