= Kannauj district =

- District of Uttar Pradesh
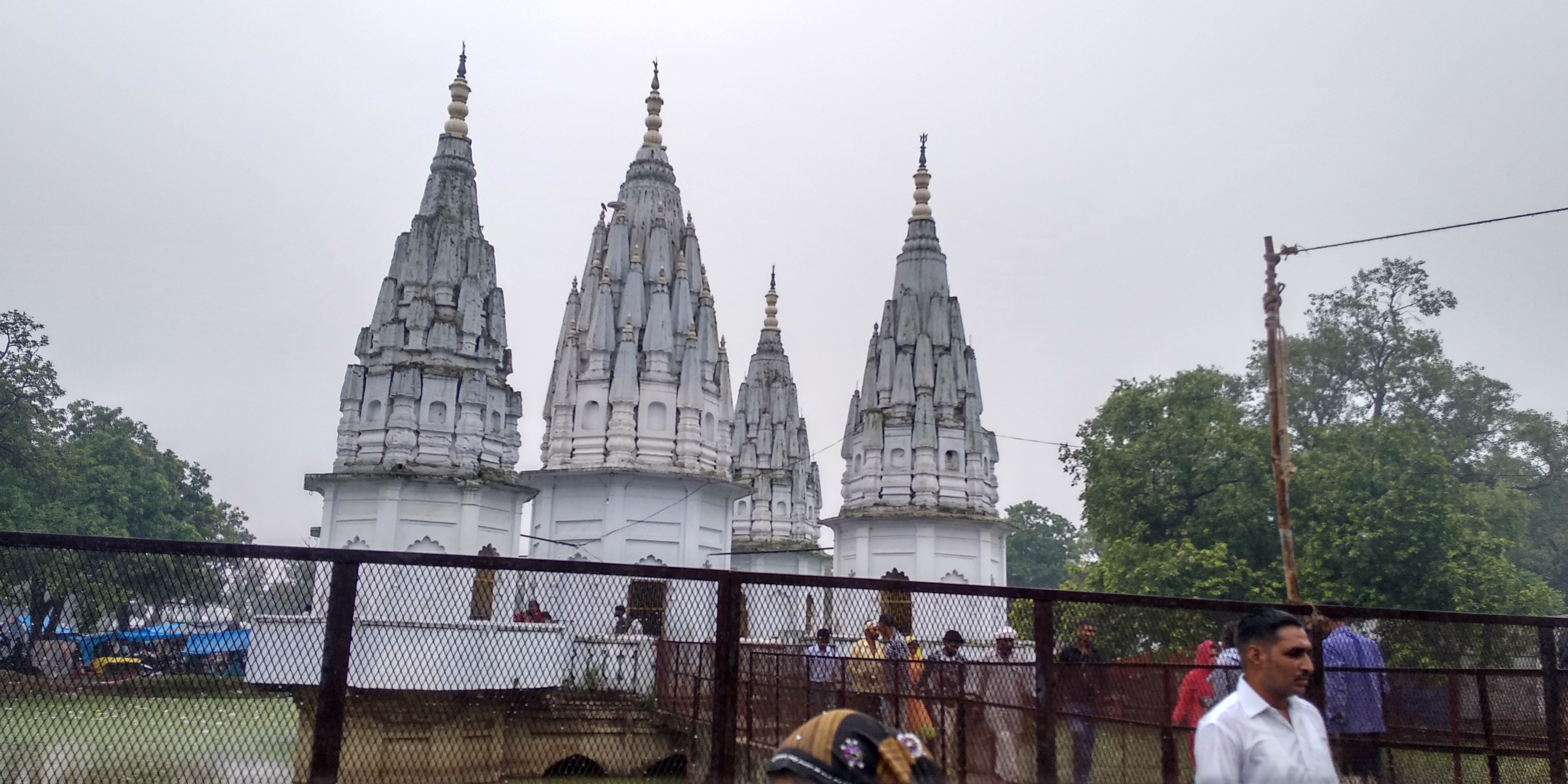
- Annapurna Temple, Tirwa

- Location of Kannauj district in Uttar Pradesh
- Country: India
- State: Uttar Pradesh
- Division: Kanpur
- Headquarters: Kannauj

Government
  - Lok Sabha constituencies: Kannauj (Lok Sabha constituency)
  - Vidhan Sabha constituencies: 1. Chhibramau; 2. Tirwa; 3. Kannauj

Area
  - Total: 1,993 km^{2} (770 sq mi)

Population (2011)
  - Total: 1,656,616
  - Density: 831.2/km^{2} (2,153/sq mi)
- Time zone: UTC+05:30 (IST)
- Website: http://kannauj.nic.in/

Kannauj district is an administrative district of Uttar Pradesh state in northern India, along the river Ganga. The historic town of Kannauj, northwest of Kanpur, is the administrative center. The district was carved out of Farrukhabad district on 18 September 1997. The native dialect of this district is Kannauji.

== Geography ==
Kannauj is located at 27.07°N 79.92°E. It has an average elevation of 139 metres (456 feet).

The Ganges is the main river of the district at the North East border of the district. Kali river is at the northern border of the district while the Ishan river flows through the District.

The climate of the district is characterized by a hot dry summer and a pleasant cold season. The average rainfall of the District is approximately 80 cm.

The district is bounded by the districts of Farrukhabad to the north, Hardoi to the northeast, Kanpur Nagar to the east, Kanpur Dehat to the southeast, Auraiya to the south, Etawah to the southwest, and Mainpuri to the west. The district is divided into three tehsils and eight development blocks. The district was split from Farrukhabad on 18 September 1997, and is part of Kanpur Division.

== Demographics ==
Historical population
Year	Pop.	±% p.a.
1901	414,501	—
1911	403,009	−0.28%
1921	383,586	−0.49%
1931	400,836	+0.44%
1941	436,118	+0.85%
1951	498,675	+1.35%
1961	590,595	+1.71%
1971	727,233	+2.10%
1981	917,167	+2.35%
1991	1,155,847	+2.34%
2001	1,388,923	+1.85%
2011	1,656,616	+1.78%

Religions in Kannauj district (2011)
Religion	Percent
Hindus	83.05%
Muslims	16.54%
Other or not stated	0.41%
Distribution of religions

According to the 2011 census Kannauj district has a population of 1,656,616, roughly equal to the nation of Guinea-Bissau or the US state of Idaho. This gives it a ranking of 299th in India (out of a total of 640). The district has a population density of 792 inhabitants per square kilometre (2,050/sq mi) . Its population growth rate over the decade 2001–2011 was 19.37%. Kannauj has a sex ratio of 879 females for every 1000 males, and a literacy rate of 74.01%. 16.95% of the population lives in urban areas. Scheduled Castes make up 18.71% of the population.

Hindus are the majority population. Muslims form a significant minority in urban areas, and the towns Samdhan and Talgram are Muslim-majority.

Languages of Kannauj district (2011)
1. Hindi (96.6%)
2. Urdu (2.89%)
3. Others (0.49%)

At the time of the 2011 Census of India, 96.62% of the population in the district spoke Hindi (or a related language) and 2.89% Urdu as their first language.

The District's population was 1,388,923 in 2001. Of these, 1,156,951 (or 83.3%) lived in rural areas, while 231,972 (or 16.7%) lived in urban areas.

== Historical and Spiritual importance ==
There are many temples in Kannauj which are very important by both Historical as well as spiritual purposes. In the time of King Harsha it was the kingdom of India.

It is famous for Kannauj Perfume also. That is the reason why it is mentioned as the city of perfumes.

== Colleges ==
=== Medical College ===
Government Medical College, Kannauj is a government medical college located in Tirwa of Kannauj. It is affiliated to King George's Medical University, Lucknow. In 2012, the institute become recognized for 100 M.B.B.S. seats by Medical Council of India (MCI).

=== Engineering College ===
Government Engineering College, Kannauj is a government engineering college in Kannauj. It is a constituent college of Dr. A.P.J. Abdul Kalam Technical University (formerly Uttar Pradesh Technical University) in Lucknow, and has its temporary campus at Harcourt Butler Technical University in Kanpur.

== Nearby cities ==
- Etawah
- Kanpur
- Farrukhabad

=== Tehsil of Kannauj District ===
- Kannauj
- Chibramau
- Tirwa
