= Kannauj =

- City
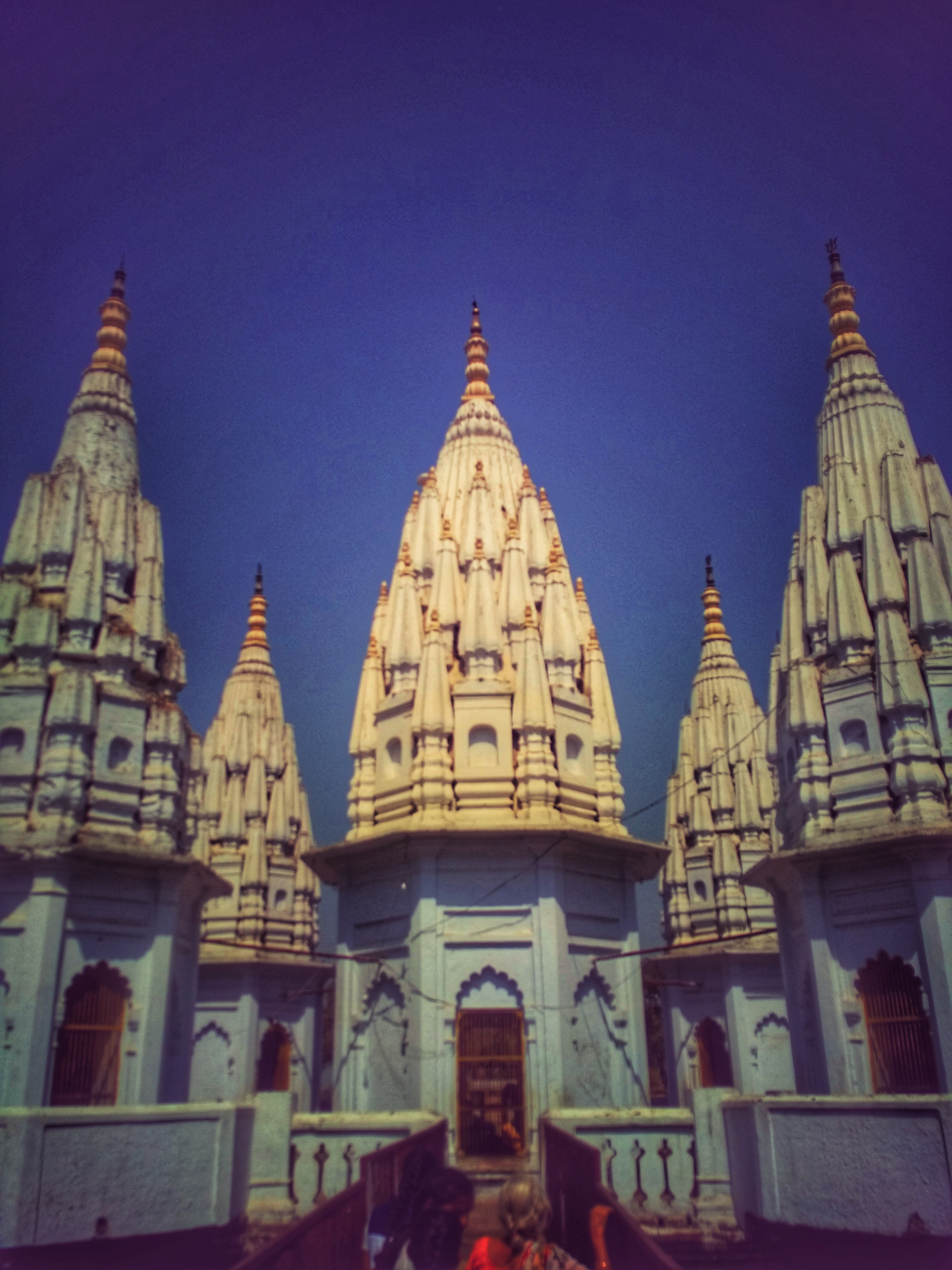
- Annapurna Temple
- Nickname: Perfume Capital of India
- Location within India Location within Uttar Pradesh
- Coordinates: 27°3′23.137″N 79°55′8.332″E
- Country: India
- State: Uttar Pradesh
- District: Kannauj

Government
  - Lok Sabha MP: Akhilesh Yadav (SP)
- Elevation: 139 m (456 ft)

Population (2011)
  - Total: 84,862
- Demonym: Kannauji

Languages
  - Official: Hindi
  - Regional: Kannauji
- Time zone: UTC+5:30 (IST)
- Postal code: 209725
- Vehicle registration: UP-74
- Website: www.kannauj.nic.in

Kannauj (Hindustani pronunciation: [kənːɔːd͡ʒ]) is an ancient city in the Indian state of Uttar Pradesh and a municipal board (nagar palika) home to the administrative headquarters of the eponymous district. Known as Kanyakubja during the ancient Vedic period, it was successively the capital city of the Mahajanapada Panchala Kingdom and then of the Ayudha dynasty. Originally known as Mahodaya in ancient Sanskrit literature dating back to the Ramayana era, and later known as Mahodaya under the Gurjara-Pratihara dynasty, in the later medieval era, it formed the core of the Kingdom of Kannauj and was ruled by multiple successive royal families or as part of greater imperial polities.

Famous as "India's perfume capital", Kannauj is known for its centuries old distillation of scents and perfume production. The traditional Kannauj Perfume, is a protected geographical indication and is elaborated with attar, produced with the petals of flowers grown in this area.

== History ==
=== Early history ===
Archaeological discoveries show that Kannauj was inhabited by the Painted Grey Ware and Northern Black Polished Ware cultures, c. 1200–600 BCE and c. 700–200 BCE, respectively. During the Vedic period, it was the capital city of the Panchala Kingdom during the reign of king Vajrayudha.

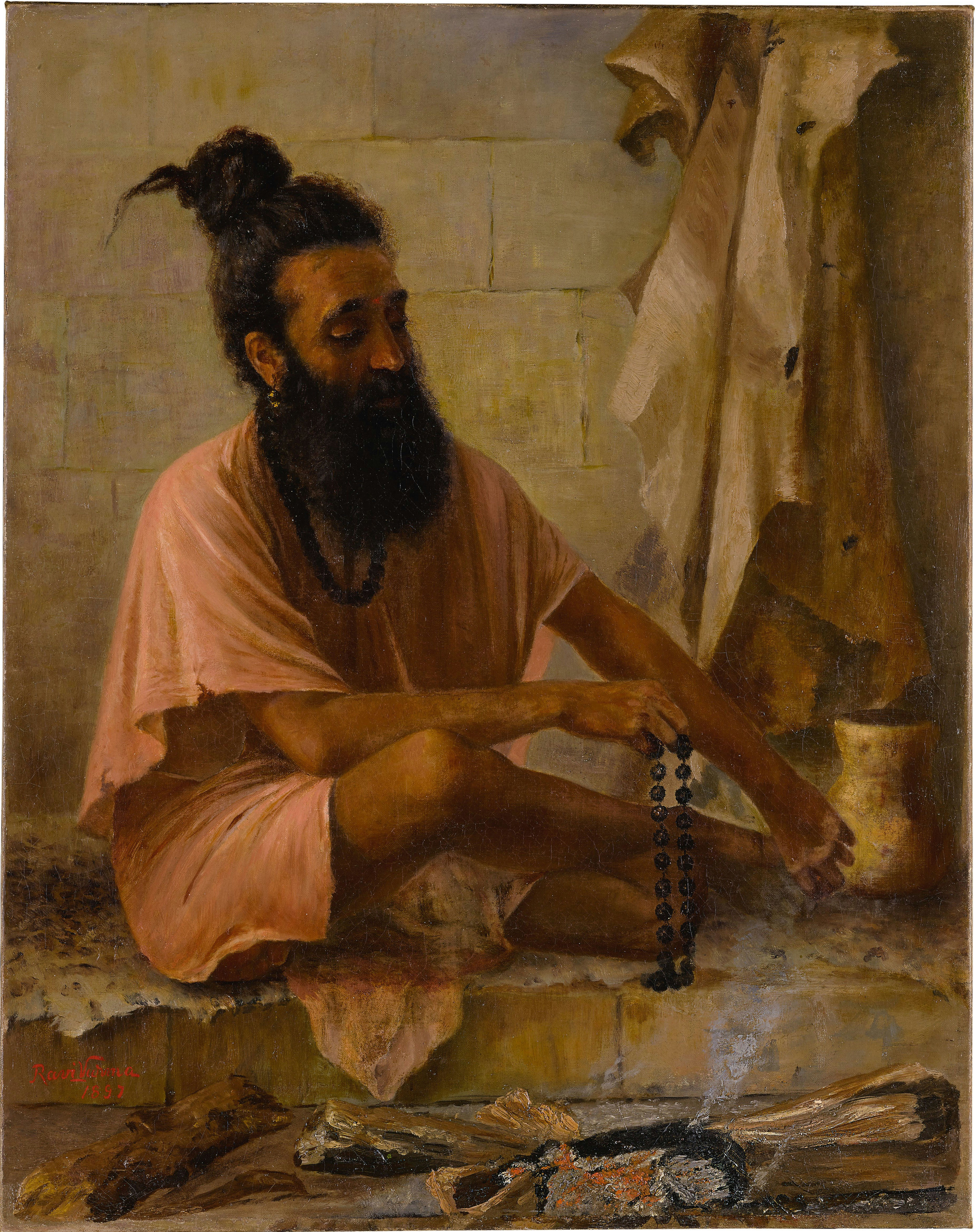
Vishvamitra in meditation, painted by Raja Ravi Varma

Under the names of Kuśasthala and Kanyakubja, it is mentioned as a well-known town in the Hindu epics, the Mahabharata and the Ramayana, and by the grammarian Patanjali (c. 150 BCE). Also according to the Hindu epics, Kannauj or Kanyakubja was the capital of Amavasu the son of Pururavas and an ancestor of Rigvedic sage Vishwamitra. According to the Valmiki Ramayana (Bala Kanda, Sarga 32), the city was originally founded as Mahodaya by King Kushanabha, a son of King Kusha and grandson of Brahma

The epic also accounts for the origin of the name Kanyakubja (the ancient root of "Kannauj"): according to the legend in Sarga 33, Kushanabha's one hundred daughters refused the advances of the wind god Vayu, who in retaliation made them hunchbacks (kubja), leading the city to be called Kanyakubja ("the city of hunchbacked maidens"). Despite this, the original name Mahodaya remained in formal and epigraphic use for centuries, appearing in royal grants and inscriptions well into the reign of the Gurjara-Pratihara dynasty.

The early Buddhist literature mentions Kannauj as Kannakujja, and refers to its location on the trade route from Mathura to Varanasi and Rajgir.

Kannauj may have been known to the Greco-Roman civilization under the name of Kanagoja or Kanogiza, which appears in Geography by Ptolemy (c. 140 CE). It was also visited by the Chinese Buddhist travellers Faxian and Xuanzang in the fifth and seventh centuries CE, respectively.

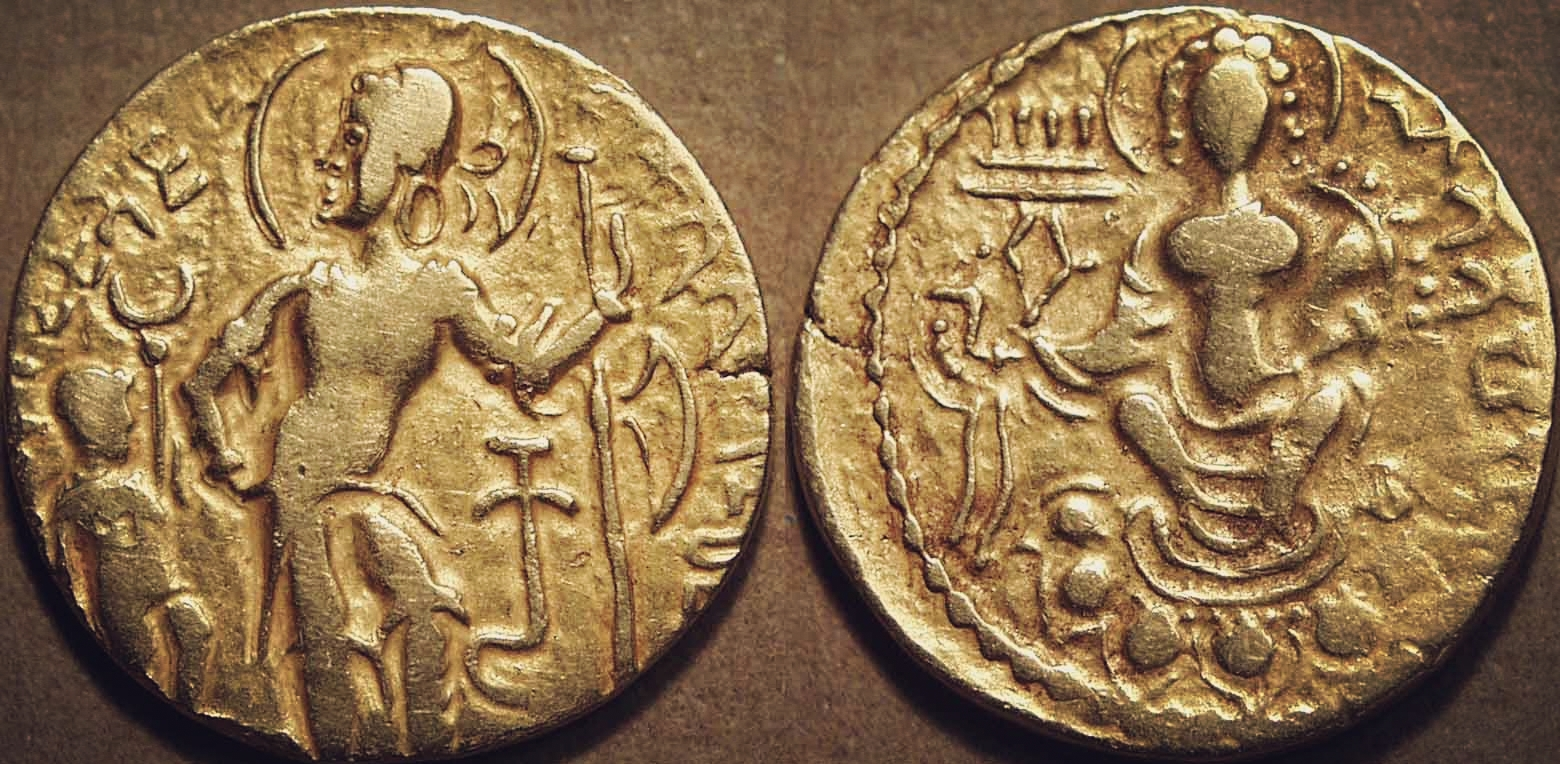
Samudragupta, Gold dinar found at Kannauj, 335-375 335-3 CE, Brāhmi legend at right: Parākramah

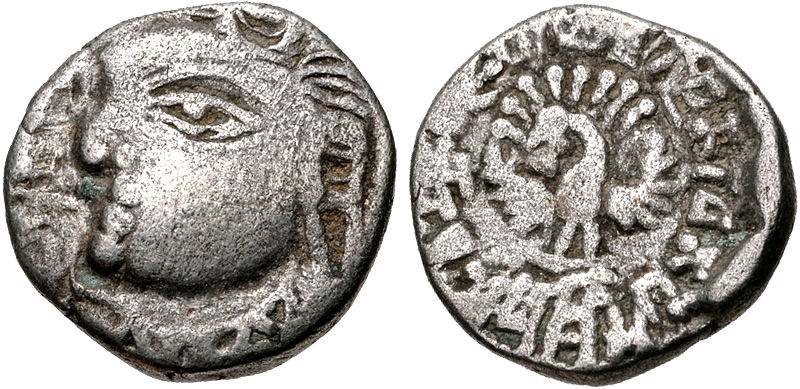
Coin of the Maukharis of Kannauj under Maharaja Isanavarman, circa 535-553 CE

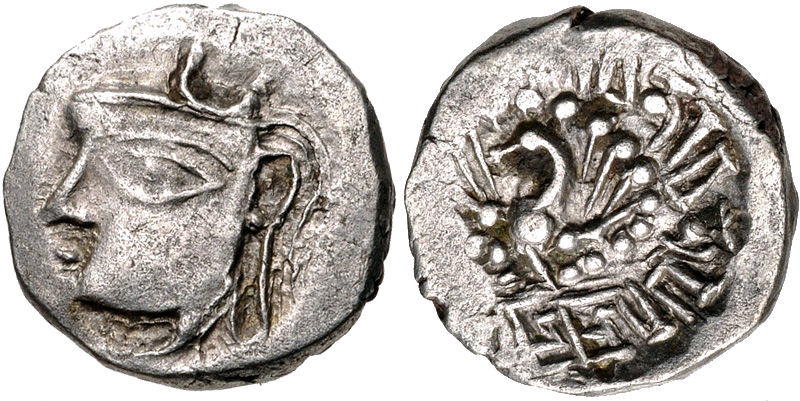
Coin of Emperor Harsha of the Vardhana dynasty, circa 606–647 CE

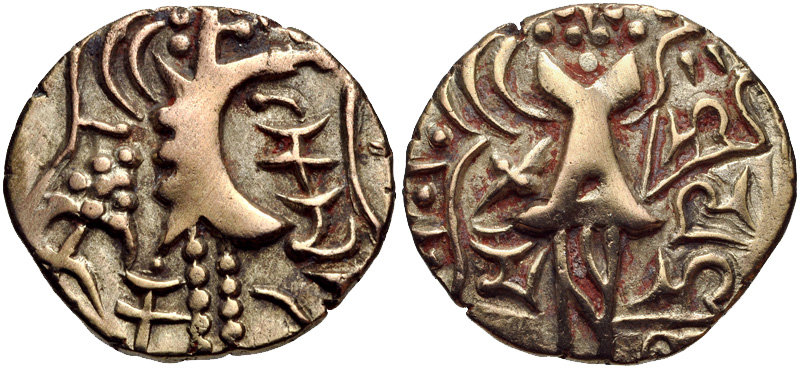
Coinage of Varman dynasty of Kannauj

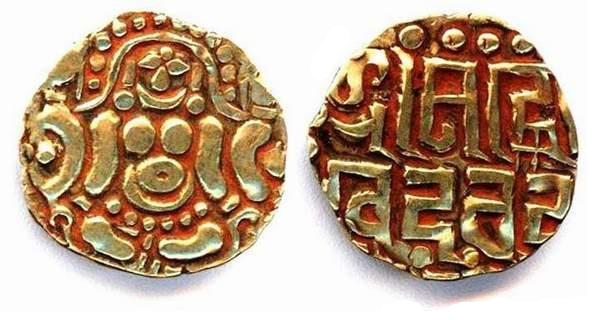
A Kalachuri-style 'seated goddess' coin of Gahadavala dynasty of Kannauj (r. c. 1114-1155 CE)

Latest numismatic evidence and find spots analysis of the Gupta dynasty coins suggests that the Kannauj-Kāśī region constituted as the original homeland of the Gupta dynasty. During the decline of the Gupta Empire in the 6th century, the Maukhari dynasty of Kannauj – who had served as vassal rulers under the Guptas - took advantage of the weakening of central authority, broke away and established control over large areas of northern India.

Under the Maukharis, Kannauj continued to grow in importance and prosperity. It became the greatest city of Northern India under Emperor Harsha (r. 606 to 647 CE) of the Vardhana dynasty, who made it his capital. Chinese pilgrim Xuanzang visited India during the reign of Harsha, and described Kannauj as a large, prosperous city with many Buddhist monasteries. Harsha died with no heir, resulting in a power vacuum until Maharaja Yashovarman seized power as the ruler of Kannauj.

=== The Kannauj Triangle ===
Kannauj became a focal point for three powerful dynasties, namely the Gurjara Pratiharas (r. 730-1036 CE), Palas (r. 750-1162 CE) and Rashtrakutas (r. 753-982 CE), between the 8th and 10th centuries. The conflict between the three dynasties has been referred to as the Tripartite struggle by many historians.

The Kannauj was the focal point of three empires: the Rashtrakutas of Deccan, the Gurjara Pratiharas of Malwa, and the Palas of Bengal.

There were initial struggles but ultimately the Gurjara Pratiharas succeeded in retaining the city. The Gurjara-Pratiharas ruled Avanti (based at Ujjain), which was bounded to the South by the Rashtrakuta Empire, and the Pala Empire to the East. The Tripartite struggle began with the defeat of Indrayudh at the hands of Gurjara-Pratihara ruler Vatsaraja (r. 780-800 CE). The Pala ruler Dharampala (~770-821 CE) was also keen to establish his authority at Kannauj, giving rise to a struggle between Vatsaraja and Dharmapala, in which Dharmapala was defeated. Taking advantage of the chaos, the Rastrakuta ruler Dhruva Dharavarsha (r. 780–793 CE) surged northwards, defeated Vatsaraja, and took Kannauj for himself, completing the furthest northern expansion by a South Indian ruler.

When the Rashtrakuta ruler Dhruva Dharavarsha advanced back to the south, Dharampala was left in control of Kannauj for some time. The struggle between the two northern dynasties of Palas and Gurjara Pratiharas continued: the Pala's vassal Chakrayudha (Dharmapala's nominee for Ujjain) was defeated by the Pratihara Nagabhata II (r. 805–833 CE), and Kannauj was again occupied by the Gurjara Pratiharas. Dharmapala tried to take control of Kannauj but was defeated badly at Moongher by the Gurjara Pratiharas. However, Nagabhata II was in turn soon defeated by the Rashtrakuta Govinda III (r. 793–814 CE), who had initiated a second northern surge. An inscription states that Chakrayudha and Dharmapala invited Govinda III to war against the Gurjara Pratiharas, but Dharmapala and Chakrayudh both submitted to the Govinda III, in order to win his sympathy. After this defeat, Pratihara power degenerated for some time. After the death of Dharampala, Nagabhata II regained hold over Kannuaj and made it the capital of the Gurjara Pratihara Empire. During this period, the Rashtrakutas were facing some internal conflicts, and so they, as well as the Pala Empire, did not contest this. Thus Gurjara Pratiharas became the greatest power in Northern India after occupying Kannauj (9th century CE).

=== Medieval times ===
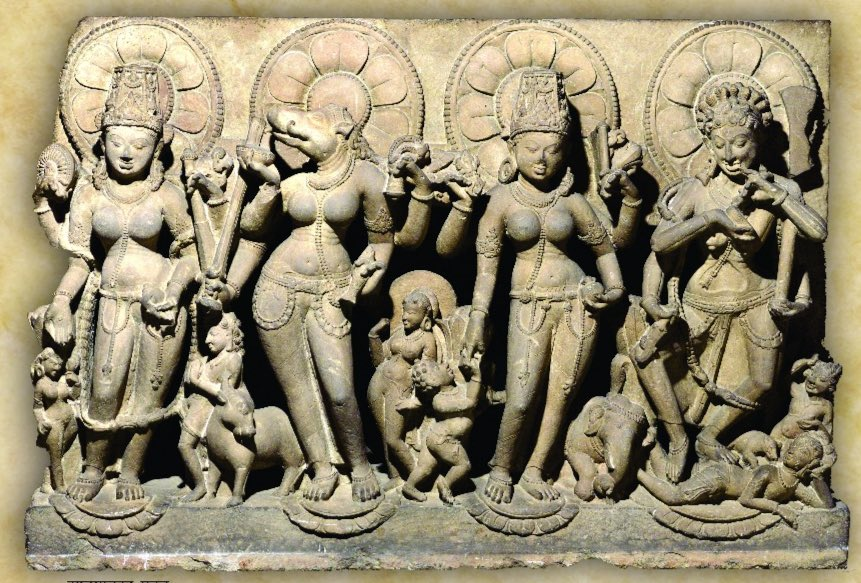
A panel depicting the Saptamatrikas, Kannauj, 9th-10th century

In Classical India, it served as the center of imperial Indian dynasties. The earliest of these was the Maukhari dynasty, and later, Emperor Harsha of the Vardhana dynasty. The city later came under the Gahadavala dynasty, and under the rule of Govindachandra, the city reached "unprecedented glory". Kannauj was also the main place of war in the Tripartite struggle between the Gurjara-Pratihara, the Palas and the Rashtrakutas.

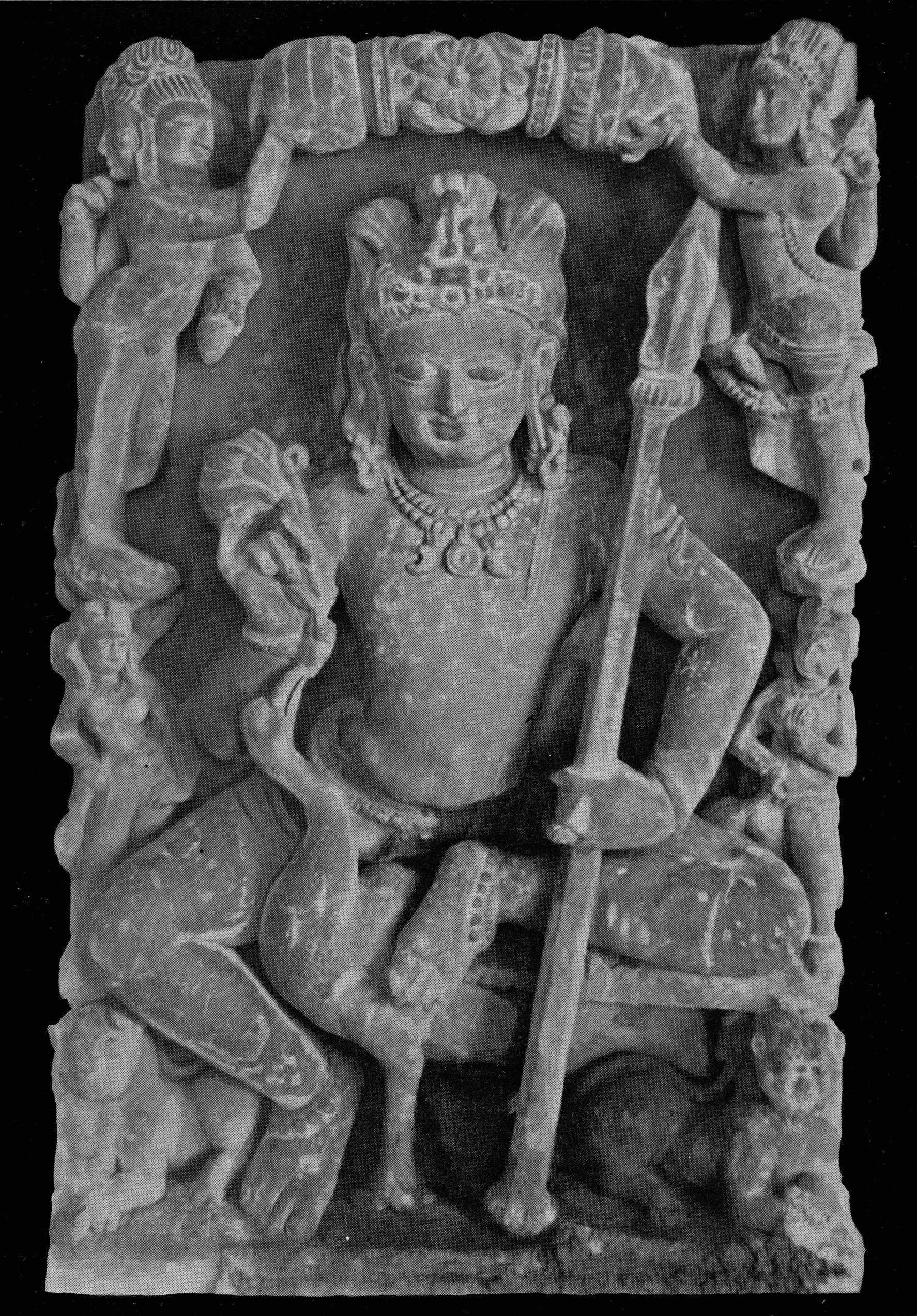
Sculpture of Skanda, The Hindu God of War, Kannauj, 8th century

Kannauj was clearly the wealthiest city in early Medieval India at large and the country all around Kannauj was called Āryāvarta. It seems likely that Kannauj and Madhyadesha was the place of origin of the majority of migrating Brahmins throughout the medieval centuries.

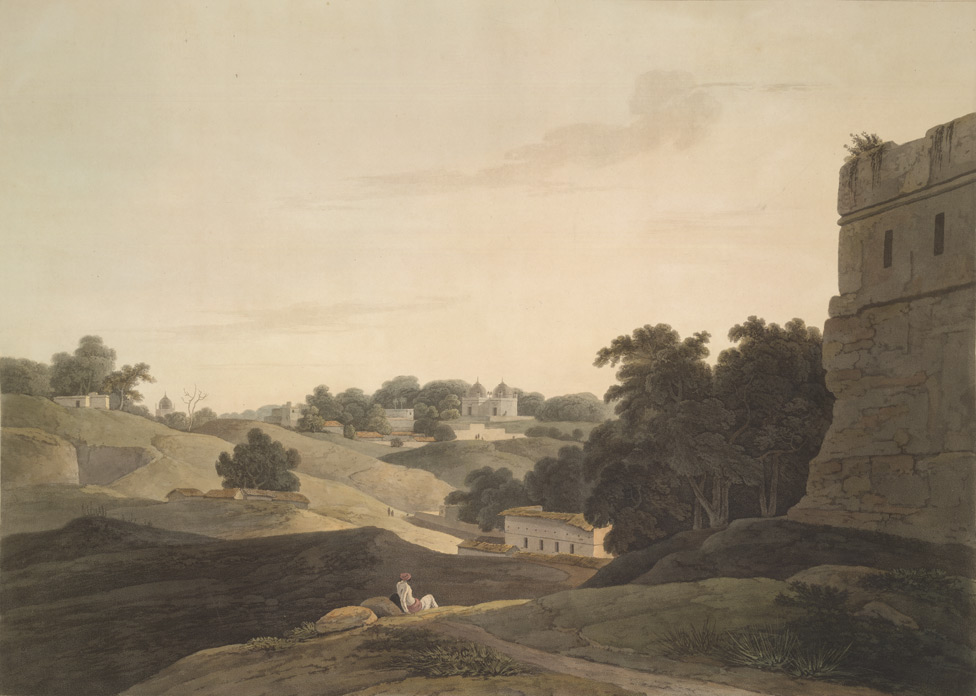
Kannauj on the bank of the Ganges

Statue of King Jaichand of Kannauj, Raja Jaichand Mounds, Kannauj

In 1010 A.D., Mahmud of Ghazni saw Kannauj as a "City which raised its head to skies which in strength and structure might justly boast to have no equals".

Sultan Mahmud of Ghazni captured Kanauj in 1018. Chandradeva founded the Gahadvala dynasty with its capital at Kannauj around 1090. His grandson Govindachandra "raised Kannauj to unprecedented glory." Muhammad Ghori advanced against the city, and in the Battle of Chandwar of 1193 killed Jayachandra.

Alberuni has referred to "Kannoj" as the key geographical point to explain marching distances to other Indian cities. The "glory of Imperial Kannauj" ended with Iltutmish's conquest.

Sher Shah Suri defeated Humayun at the Battle of Kannauj on 17 May 1540.

Famous Pir-e-Kamil, Hazrat Pir Shah Jewna Al-Naqvi Al-Bokhari was also born in Kannauj in 1493 in the reign of the Delhi Sultanate Sultan Sikandar Lodi (r. 1489-1517). He was a descendant of Jalaluddin Surkh-Posh Bukhari and his father Syed Sadar-ud-din Shah Kabeer Naqvi Al Bukhari was a great saint and was also among the advisors of Sultan Sikandar Lodhi. Shah Jewna migrated to Shah Jeewna (a town named after him) now in Pakistan. Shah Jewna’s colonized towns in Kannauj :- Siray-e-Miran, Bibiyan Jalalpur, Makhdumpur, Lal Pur (associated with the name of Saint Sayyed Jalaluddin Haider Surkh Posh Bukhari or Lal Bukhari). His descendants still present in various parts of India and Pakistan.

=== Colonial period ===
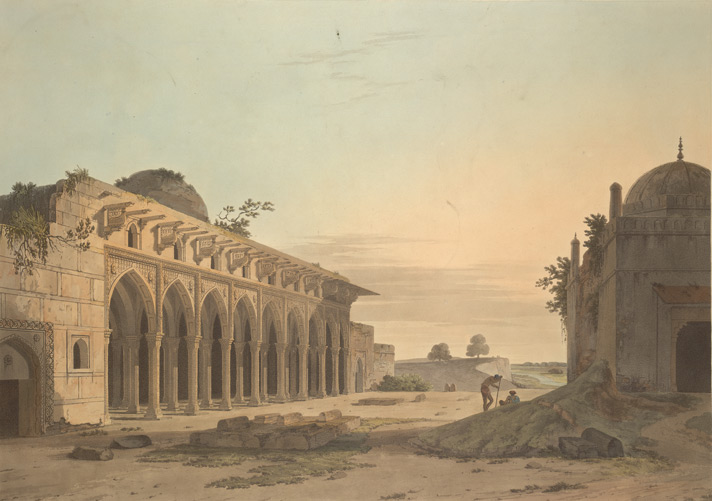
Ruins at Cannouge, an engraving by Thomas Daniell from 1802

During early English rule in India, the city was spelled Cannodge by them. The Nawab Hakim Mehndi Ali Khan has been constantly associated with the development of city of Kannauj by the travellers and writers of the period. A ghat (Mehndighat), a Sarai (for the free stay of travellers and merchants) and various metalled roads were built by the Nawab which also bear his name.

Different spellings that are used to refer to Kannauj, apart from the official Kannauj, are Cannodge, Kannauj, Kannoj, Kinnouge, Qannauj and Qannawj. The British who visited Kannauj in the later part of 19th century mostly referred to it as Kanauj (notice the single "n"). George Forster spells it Kinnouge. Alexander Cunnigham spelled it Kanoj.

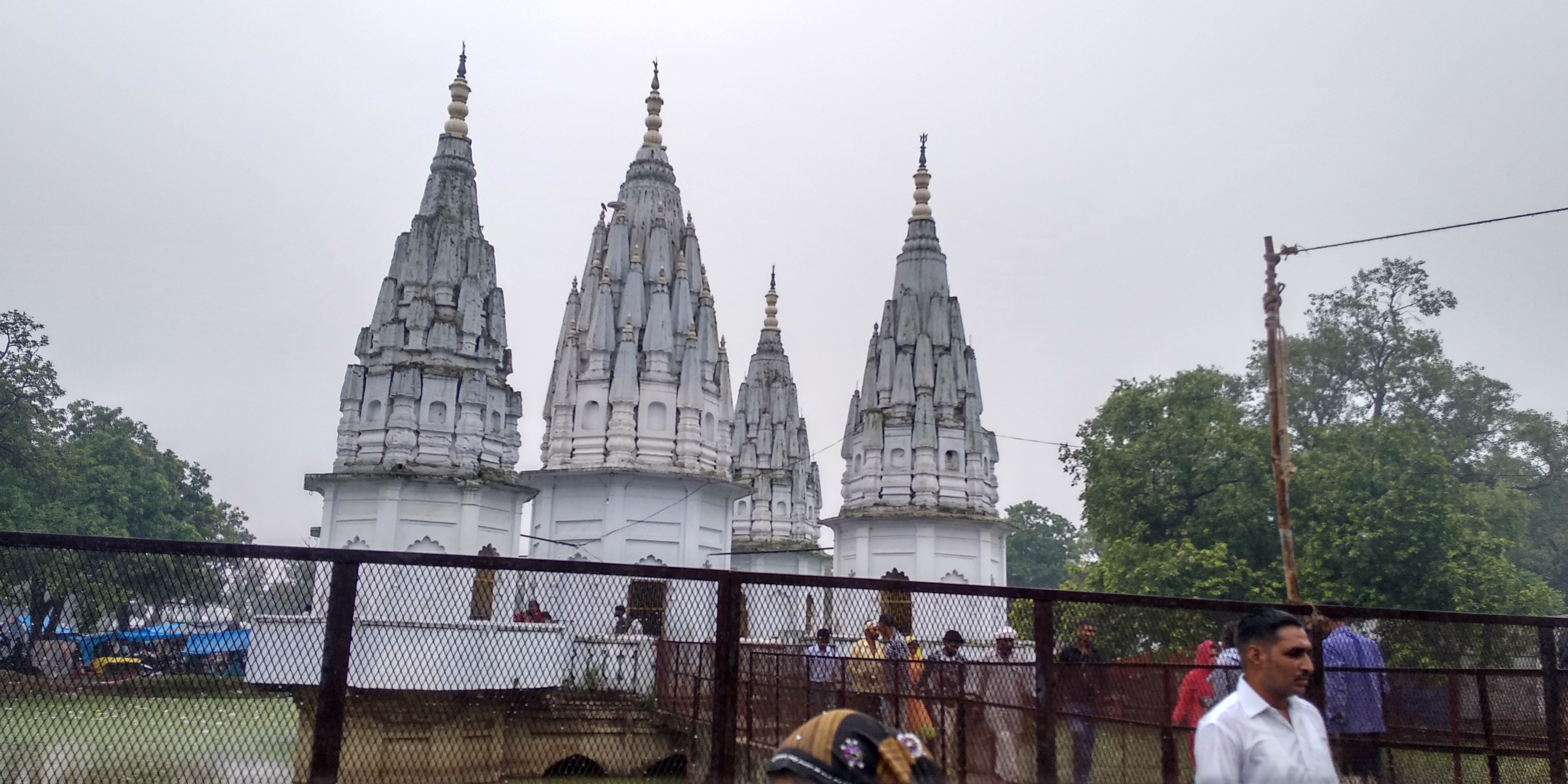
Annapurna Temple, Tirwa, Kannauj

== Perfume and flowers ==
Kannauj is famous for distilling of scents and perfumes. It is known as "India's perfume capital" and is famous for its traditional Kannauj Perfume, a government protected entity.

Kannauj itself has more than 200 perfume distilleries and is a market center for perfume, tobacco and rose water. It has given its name to a distinct dialect of the Hindustani known as Kannauji, which has two different codes or registers.

Changes in when flower crops bloom due to climate change are affecting the industry of perfumes made from natural sources, like attar from roses. The unpredictable bloom times make it difficult to deliver the blooms and raises a concern that perfumes from these natural sources will be replaced by chemicals.

Kannauj has been a centre of attar production for several centuries, especially since the Mughal era. Traditional attars are produced using the ancient deg and bhapka method, a hydro-distillation process using copper stills passed down through generations of artisans.

Thousands of residents of Kannauj are directly or indirectly involved in attar production. Popular attars include rose, jasmine, khus, kewra, and mogra. These perfumes are exported to the Middle East, Europe, and the United States.

Kannauj perfumes received a Geographical Indication (GI) tag in 2014, helping protect their authenticity and heritage.

== Demographics ==
As of 2011 India census, Kannauj had a population of 84,862. Males constitute 53% of the population and females 47%. Kannauj has an average literacy rate of 72.70%: male literacy is 80.90%, and female literacy is 63.33%. In Kannauj, 14% of the population is under 6 years of age.

Religion in Kannauj
1. Hindu (62.5%)
2. Muslim (36.6%)
3. Christian (0.09%)
4. Jain (0.58%)
5. Sikh (0.07%)
6. Buddhist (0.02%)
7. Others (0.02%)
8. No religion (0.10%)

== Colleges ==
Government Medical College, Kannauj is a government medical college located in Tirwa of Kannauj, Uttar Pradesh, India. It is affiliated to King George's Medical University, Lucknow.

Government Engineering College, Kannauj is a government engineering college located at Kannauj. It is a constituent college of Dr. A.P.J. Abdul Kalam Technical University (formerly Uttar Pradesh Technical University) in Lucknow. The college is situated at Aher, Tirwa.

== Transportation ==
The city is served by two major railway station Kannauj railway station and Kannauj City railway station. The nearest airport is Kanpur Airport, about two hours drive from the town.

It is situated on GT road (Delhi to Kanpur). It has road transportation Kannauj Depo. under the Uttar Pradesh State Road Transportation Corporation (UPSRTC).

== Notable people ==
- Ajamila, famous Brahmin
- Āma, King of Kannauj
- Malini Awasthi, folk singer
- Mihira Bhoja, king of North India
- Siddiq Hasan Khan, nawab of Bhopal
- Sayyid Muhammad Qanauji, Sufi
- Samyukta, princess of Kannauj
- Sushruta, Ancient Indian Physician
- Yashovarman, king of Kannauj

== See also ==
- Kannauji language
- Kannauj Perfume
- Bishungarh, Uttar Pradesh
