= Uttar Pradesh Navnirman Sena =

Uttar Pradesh Navnirman Sena, or UP Navnirman Sena, is a political organization based in the state of Uttar Pradesh, India. It is based on the ideologies of Raj Thackeray and his party Maharashtra Navnirman Sena. It is an ally of Bharatiya janta party(BJP). The party has a record of hate speech.

The group was in news for beheading Mayawati's statue located at Ambedkar park, Gomti Nagar, Lucknow. On 26 July 2012 the group gave the Uttar Pradesh Chief Minister, Akhilesh Yadav, an ultimatum to remove similar statues of Miss Mayawati. The group was angry with Mayawati's purported ill-treatment of farmers and Rajputs. Three members of the organization were arrested by the police for the beheading incident.
