= Fun Republic Mall =

Fun Republic Mall may refer to:

- Fun Republic Mall (Coimbatore), a shopping mall in Coimbatore, India
- Fun Republic Mall (Lucknow), a shopping mall in Lucknow, India
