= 2016 Budget of Uttar Pradesh =

Annual budget of the state of Uttar Pradesh, India

2016 Budget of Uttar Pradesh government
- Submitted: 12 February 2016
- Submitted by: Akhilesh Yadav
- Submitted to: Vidhan Sabha, Lucknow, Uttar Pradesh Legislative Assembly
- Party: Samajwadi Party
- Total expenditures: ₹3.46 lakh crore (US$40 billion)
- Deficit: ₹49,960 crore

Akhilesh Yadav, the Chief Minister of Uttar Pradesh announced the Uttar Pradesh Budget for 2016-17 on 12 February 2016. According to the Budget, the year 2016-17 has been announced to be the Year of the Youth and the Farmers. It was presented in Vidhan Sabha, Lucknow before the Governor and joint session of the two Houses. The ₹3.46 lakh crore (US$40 billion) Budget 2016-17 was 14% more than 2015-2016.

== Key Points ==
- Total Budget: ₹3.46 lakh crore (US$40 billion)
- Revenue Expenditure: ₹2.53 lakh crore (US$29 billion)
- Capital Expenditure: ₹93, 580 crore
- Fiscal Deficit: ₹49,960 crore, which is 4.04% of the state's Gross Domestic Product

== Allocations ==
=== Farmers ===
==== Agriculture ====
Agriculture has been one of the main focuses of the UP Budget 2016-17.

- Provision of ₹1,336 crore for payment of cane price arrear to farmers.
- Provision of ₹120 crore for constructing and strengthening of link roads to facilitate transportation.
- Money obtained in Farmer Accident Insurance Scheme to increase from ₹1 lakhs to ₹5 lakhs.

==== Irrigation ====
- Target to distribute crop loan of ₹93,212 crore for purchase of fertilizers, seeds, etc.
- ₹2,157 crore proposed for Sarayu Canal Project in Eastern UP to enable irrigation in 14 lakh hectares of area.
- ₹1,52 crore for irrigation schemes of the new programs has been proposed.

=== Social Security ===
- A target of covering 55 lakh beneficiaries under Samajwadi Pension Yojna for the year 2016-17 has been set. ₹3,327 crore has been proposed for the same.
- ₹500 crore proposed for National Family Benefit Scheme.
- Farmer Accident Insurance Scheme replaced with Samajwadi Insurance Scheme.
