= Bharwara Sewage Treatment Plant =

The Bharwara Sewage Treatment Plant (STP) is located at Bharwara in the Gomti Nagar locality of the city Lucknow in India. Operation of the Sewage Treatment Plant commenced on 15 January 2011. The project cost ₹360 crore (US$43 million).

The project was initially report to start function at one-third of its planned capacity in July 2010. The plant has been cited as the largest sewage treatment plant in Asia. In January 2019, the plant began production of solar power for its needs and it was reported that it will sell the excess electricity produced to the Uttar Pradesh Power Corporation.

Presence of antibiotic-resistant bacteria has been reported at the plant.
