= Janeshwar Mishra Park =

Urban park in India

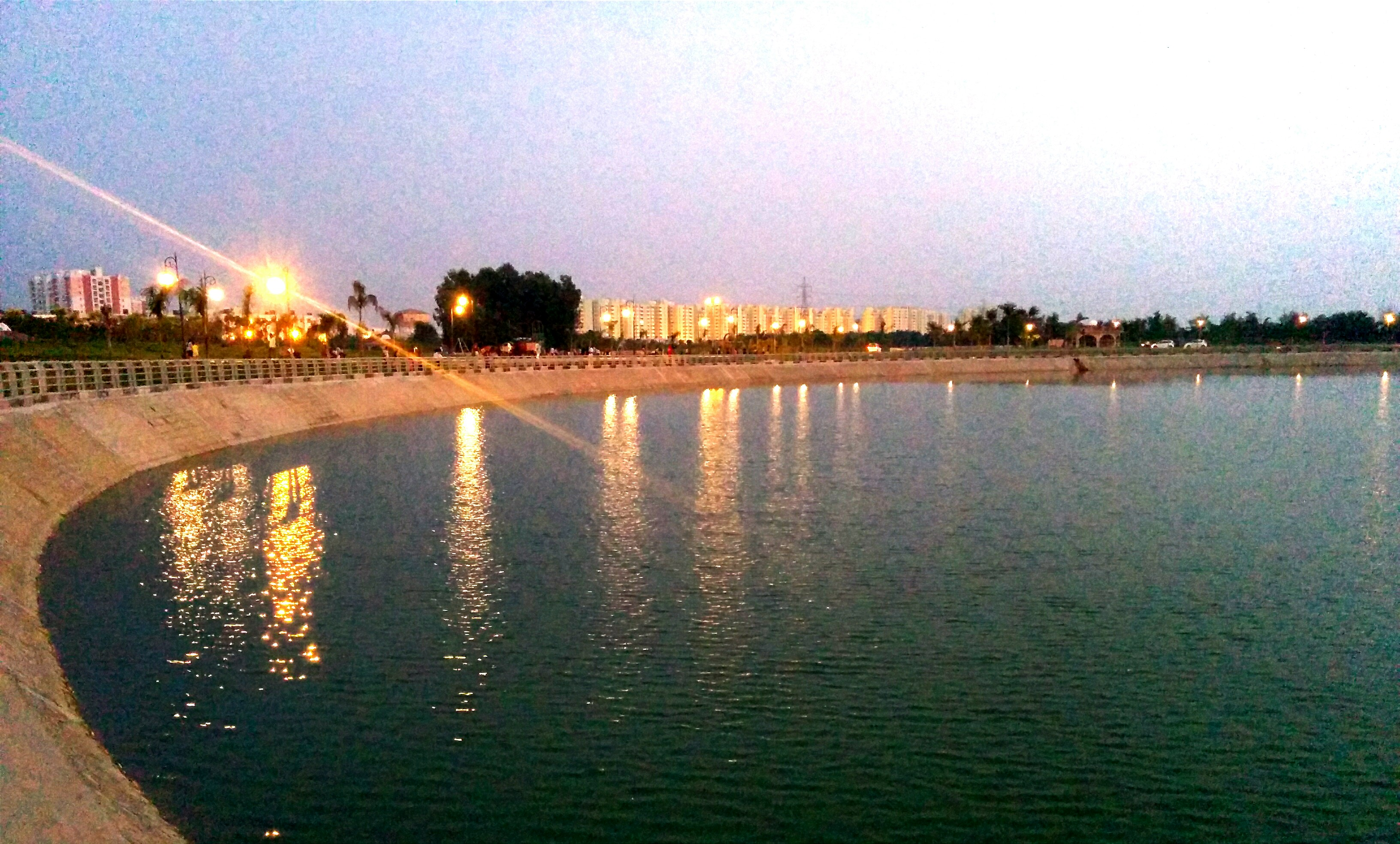
- Man-made lake at the park premises.
- Interactive map of Janeshwar Mishra Park
- Type: Public park
- Location: Gomti Nagar in Lucknow, Uttar Pradesh, India
- Coordinates: 26°50′06″N 80°59′19″E
- Area: 376 acres (152 ha)
- Created: 2014
- Operator: Lucknow Development Authority
- Status: Open year round

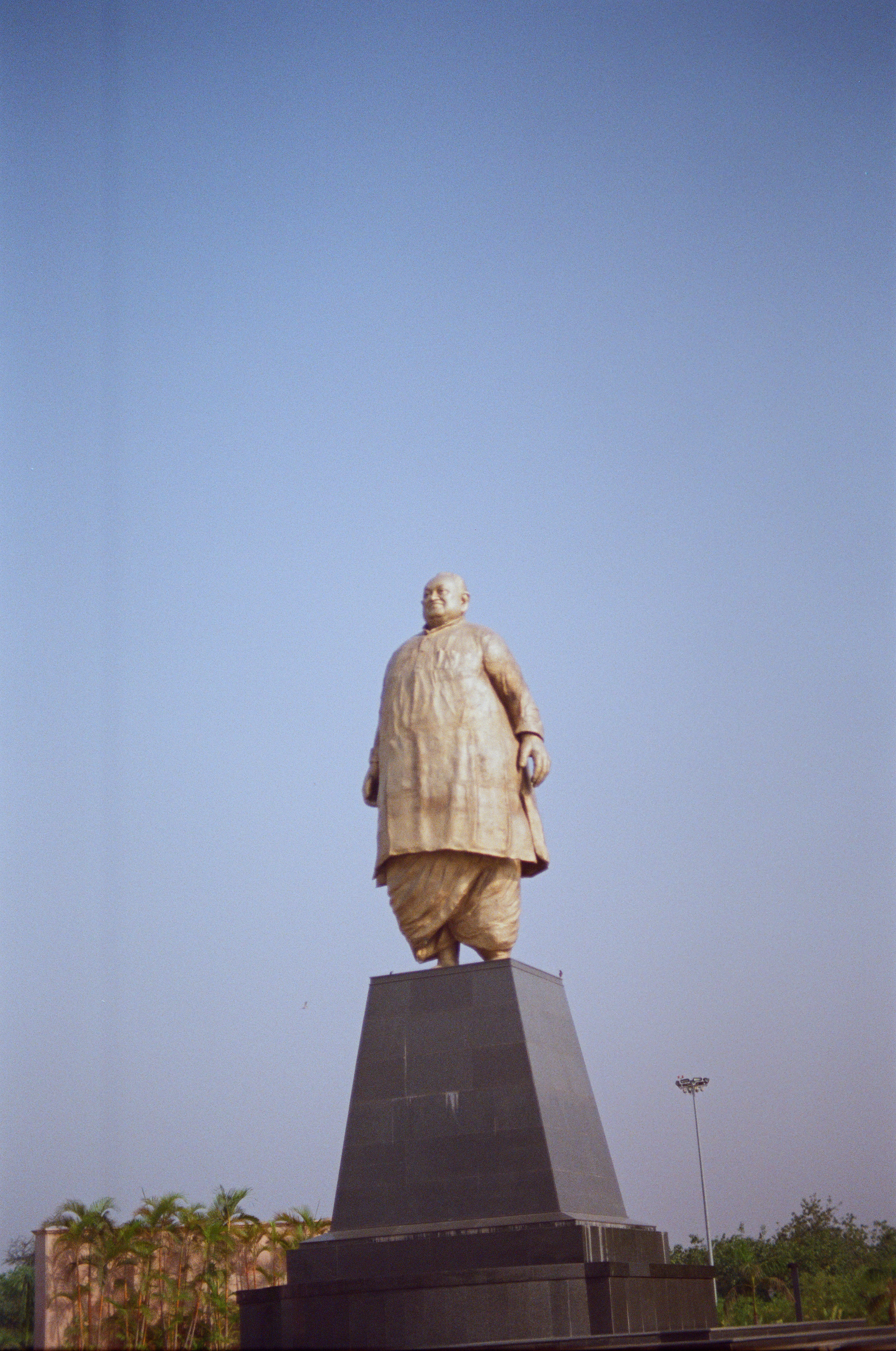
Pandit Janeshwar Mishra's idol in the park.

Janeshwar Mishra Park is an urban park operating in Gomti Nagar in Lucknow, India. It was named in memory of late politician Janeshwar Mishra from Samajwadi Party. Spanning approximately 376 acres (152 hectares), it is among the largest urban parks in Asia and is often described as Lucknow's answer to London's Hyde Park. The park is maintained by the Lucknow Development Authority (LDA)

== History ==
The foundation stone was laid on 6 August 2012 by Akhilesh Yadav, then Chief Minister of Uttar Pradesh, on what would have been Janeshwar Mishra's 79th birthday. Construction was carried out by the Lucknow Development Authority at a total cost of ₹168 crore. The park was inaugurated on 5 August 2014 and opened to the general public shortly thereafter.

The park's hydrological and geological plan was prepared by the Indian Institute of Technology Kanpur, and its architectural and landscape blueprint was drafted by the School of Planning and Architecture, New Delhi. The design drew on Hyde Park, London as a conceptual reference for a large, open, publicly accessible green space within an urban setting.

In 2024, the Government of Uttar Pradesh announced an additional allocation of ₹10.16 crore for a dedicated sports arena and further amenities within the park, with a targeted completion period of nine months.

== Location ==
The park is situated in Gomti Nagar Extension, Part-1, in the north-eastern part of Lucknow. The Lucknow–Faizabad Northern Railway line runs along its northern edge, while the southern boundary adjoins the plains of the River Gomti. This riverine setting contributes to the park's ecological character, particularly its biodiversity and the seasonal presence of migratory birds. The site is accessible from the commercial and residential areas of Gomti Nagar by road.

== Design ==
The park is organised around three artificial lakes as its central landscape feature. The largest covers approximately 40 to 45 acres (16 to 18 ha); two smaller water bodies of roughly 14 acres (5.7 ha) and 18 acres (7.3 ha) are located elsewhere on the site. The lakes were designed to attract migratory birds and support aquatic biodiversity.Landscaped mounds, planted berms, and native tree cover are distributed across the site. Dedicated cycling and jogging tracks run along the perimeter and through internal pathways, separated from pedestrian walkways.

== Features ==
The three lakes within the park are its most visited feature. Paddle boating and gondola rides are available on the central lake at a charge of ₹100 per ride. The lake margins attract migratory waterfowl during the winter months and are used informally by birdwatchers.

The park has a network of designated cycling and jogging tracks that run the full perimeter and connect internally across the site. These tracks are separated from pedestrian pathways. The full perimeter loop extends over several kilometres, making the park a regular destination for fitness users in the early morning hours. An open-air amphitheatre within the park is used for cultural programmes, public events, and community gatherings and outdoor gymnasium equipment is installed at several points along the jogging circuit, providing free fitness infrastructure to park users. A designated yoga and meditation area is available within the park and is regularly used in the early morning hours.

A themed section within the park contains life-size dinosaur sculptures set in a landscaped environment. The attraction is used for both recreational and educational purposes and is particularly frequented by families with children.

A dedicated butterfly enclosure within the park is planted with flowering and native vegetation to provide habitat for multiple butterfly species. It functions as both a conservation zone and a visitor attraction. The herbal garden contains labelled medicinal and aromatic plant species and serves an educational function for visitors interested in traditional plant knowledge. Multiple children's play zones are distributed across the park, equipped with age-appropriate equipment and set within shaded areas. A musical fountain operates at scheduled times in the evenings, offering a synchronised water-and-light display.

A life-size statue of Janeshwar Mishra stands within the park grounds as a commemorative installation.

== Janeshwar Mishra ==
Janeshwar Mishra (5 August 1933 – 22 January 2010) was an Indian politician from Ballia district, Uttar Pradesh. He studied at Allahabad University, where he joined the Samajwadi Yuvajan Sabha and came into contact with Ram Manohar Lohia and Raj Narain. He became known as Chhote Lohia (meaning "Lohia Junior") for his identification with socialist ideology.

Mishra was elected to the Lok Sabha four times from the Prayagraj constituency and served in the Rajya Sabha representing Uttar Pradesh from 1996 onwards. He held several ministerial portfolios across multiple governments, including Minister of State for Shipping and Transport (1979–80), Minister of Railways (1990–91) under Prime Minister Chandra Shekhar, Minister of Water Resources (1996–97), and Minister of Petroleum and Natural Gas (1997–98). He is regarded as a co-founder of the Samajwadi Party alongside Mulayam Singh Yadav and served as its national vice-president.

Mishra died of cardiac arrest on 22 January 2010 at Tej Bahadur Sapru Hospital, Allahabad, at the age of 76. At the time of his death he was a sitting member of the Rajya Sabha.
