= Karhal Assembly constituency =

Constituency of the Uttar Pradesh legislative assembly in India

Coordinates: 26.9975978°N 78.9415151°E

Karhal
- Constituency No. 110 for the Uttar Pradesh Legislative Assembly

Constituency details
- Country: India
- Region: North India
- State: Uttar Pradesh
- District: Mainpuri
- Lok Sabha constituency: Mainpuri
- Reservation: None

Member of Legislative Assembly
- 18th Uttar Pradesh Legislative Assembly
- Incumbent Tej Pratap Singh Yadav
- Party: Samajwadi Party
- Elected year: 2024

Karhal Assembly constituency is one of the 403 constituencies of the Uttar Pradesh Legislative Assembly, India. It is a part of the Mainpuri district and one of the five assembly constituencies in the Mainpuri Lok Sabha constituency. First election in this assembly constituency was held in 1957 after the "DPACO (1956)" (delimitation order) was passed in 1956. After the "Delimitation of Parliamentary and Assembly Constituencies Order" was passed in 2008, the constituency was assigned identification number 110.

Formerly this constituency is represented by Samajwadi Party's national president Akhilesh Yadav who has been elected in 2022 Uttar Pradesh Legislative Assembly election by defeating Bharatiya Janata Party's candidate S.P Singh Baghel.

Akhilesh Yadav is formerly serving as the leader of opposition in 18th Uttar Pradesh Assembly and had previously also hold the office of Chief Minister of the state from 2012 to 2017.

== Members of the Legislative Assembly ==
Election	Assembly	Member	Party
1957	2nd Assembly	Ch.Nathu Singh Yadav	Praja Socialist Party
1957	2nd Assembly	Ram Din	Praja Socialist Party
1962	3rd Assembly	Ram Singh	Swatantra Party
1967	4th Assembly	Munshilal Chamar	Swatantra Party
1969	5th Assembly	Munshilal Chamar	Swatantra Party
1974	6th Assembly	Ch.Nathu Singh Yadav	Bharatiya Kranti Dal
1977	7th Assembly	Ch.Nathu Singh Yadav	Janata Party
1980	8th Assembly	Sheo Mangal Singh	Indian National Congress (I)
1985	9th Assembly	Babu Ram Yadav	Lok Dal
1989	10th Assembly	Babu Ram Yadav	Janata Dal
1991	11th Assembly	Babu Ram Yadav	Janata Party
1993	12th Assembly	Babu Ram Yadav	Samajwadi Party
1996	13th Assembly	Babu Ram Yadav	Samajwadi Party
2002	14th Assembly	Sobaran Singh Yadav	Bharatiya Janata Party
2007	15th Assembly	Sobaran Singh Yadav	Samajwadi Party
2012	16th Assembly	Sobaran Singh Yadav	Samajwadi Party
2017	17th Assembly	Sobaran Singh Yadav	Samajwadi Party
2022	18th Assembly	Akhilesh Yadav	Samajwadi Party
2024^	18th Assembly	Tej Pratap Singh Yadav	Samajwadi Party

^ denotes bypoll

== Election results ==
=== 2027 ===
2027 Uttar Pradesh Legislative Assembly election: Karhal
Party	Candidate	Votes	%	±%
INDIA				
NDA				
BSP				
NOTA	None of the above			
Majority				
Turnout				
gain from		Swing		

=== 2024 bypoll ===
Uttar Pradesh Legislative Assembly by-election, 2024: Karhal
Party	Candidate	Votes	%	±%
SP	Tej Pratap Singh Yadav	104,304	50.45	▼9.68
BJP	Anujesh Pratap Singh	89,503	43.33	▲10.59
BSP	Avanish Kumar Shakya	8,409	4.07	▼2.3
ASP(KR)	Pradip kumar	2,499	1.21	NEW
NOTA	None of the above	791	0.38	▼0.39
Majority		14,801	7.12	▼20.26
Turnout		2,06,734	54.1	▼12.01
SP hold		Swing	▼9.68	

=== 2022 ===
2022 Uttar Pradesh Legislative Assembly election: Karhal
Party	Candidate	Votes	%	±%
SP	Akhilesh Yadav	148,196	60.12	▲10.55
BJP	S.P. Singh Baghel	80,692	32.74	▲1.44
BSP	Kuladip Narayan	15,701	6.37	▼7.74
NOTA	None of the above	1,909	0.77	▲0.29
Majority		67,504	27.38	▲9.11
Turnout		246,498	66.02	▲6.85
SP hold		Swing	▲10.13	

=== 2017 ===
2017 Uttar Pradesh Legislative Assembly election: Karhal
Party	Candidate	Votes	%	±%
SP	Sobaran Singh Yadav	104,221	49.57	
BJP	Rama Shakya	65,816	31.3	
BSP	Dalvir Singh	29,676	14.11	
RLD	Kaushal Yadav	4,683	2.23	
NOTA	None of the above	1,014	0.48	
Majority		38,405	18.27	
Turnout		210,268	59.17	
SP hold		Swing	▲2.9	

=== 2012 ===
2012 Uttar Pradesh Legislative Assembly election: Karhal
Party	Candidate	Votes	%	±%
SP	Sobaran Singh Yadav	92,536	46.9	−
BSP	Jaivir Singh	61,593	31.22	−
BJP	Anil Kumar Yadav	13,114	6.65	−
	Remainder 13 candidates	30,072	15.24	−
Majority		30,943	15.68	−
Turnout		197,315	60.96	−
SP hold		Swing		

== Wards / Areas ==
Extent of Karhal Assembly constituency is KC Barnahal, Karhal & Karhal NP of Karhal Tehsil; KCs Ghiror, Kuchela & Ghiror NP of Mainpuri Tehsil.

== See also ==
- Mainpuri Lok Sabha constituency
- Mainpuri district
- 18th Legislative Assembly of Uttar Pradesh
- Uttar Pradesh Legislative Assembly
- Vidhan Bhawan
