= Sobaran Singh Yadav =

Indian politician

Member of the Uttar Pradesh Legislative Assembly
- In office March 2002 – March 2022
- Preceded by: Babu Ram Yadav
- Succeeded by: Akhilesh Yadav
- Constituency: Karhal

Personal details
- Born: 7 August 1951 (age 75) Etawah district, Uttar Pradesh
- Party: Samajwadi Party
- Spouse: Maya Devi Yadav
- Relations: Girja Devi (sister); Darshan Singh Yadav (brother)
- Children: Mukul Yadav & 2 daughters
- Parent: Kamta Prasad Yadav (father)
- Education: Allahabad University
- Profession: Farmer, businessperson & politician

Sobaran Singh Yadav is an Indian politician and a member of the Sixteenth Legislative Assembly of Uttar Pradesh in India. He represented the Karhal constituency of Uttar Pradesh and is a member of the Samajwadi Party political party.

== Early life and education ==
Sobaran Singh Yadav was born in Etawah district. He attended the Allahabad University and attained Bachelor of Arts degree.

== Political career ==
Sobaran Singh Yadav was a MLA for 1st time by representing BJP.He has been a MLA for three terms. He represented the Karhal constituency and is a member of the Samajwadi Party political party.

== Posts held ==
| # | From | To | Position | Comments |
|---|---|---|---|---|
| 01 | March 2017 | March 2022 | Member, 17th Legislative Assembly | |
| 02 | March 2012 | March 2017 | Member, 16th Legislative Assembly | |
| 03 | May 2007 | March 2012 | Member, 15th Legislative Assembly | |
| 04 | February 2002 | May 2007 | Member, 14th Legislative Assembly | |

== See also ==
- Karhal (Assembly constituency)
- Sixteenth Legislative Assembly of Uttar Pradesh
- Uttar Pradesh Legislative Assembly
