= Indian Institute of Information Technology, Lucknow =

University based in Lucknow, Uttar Pradesh

- Motto: Vidya dadati Vinayam, Vinaya dadati patratam
- Type: Technical University (Public–Private Partnership)
- Established: 2015
- Director: Dr. Arun Mohan Sherry
- Location: Lucknow, Uttar Pradesh, India; 26°48′3″N 81°1′27.16″E
- Campus: IT City, Lucknow
- Website: www.iiitl.ac.in

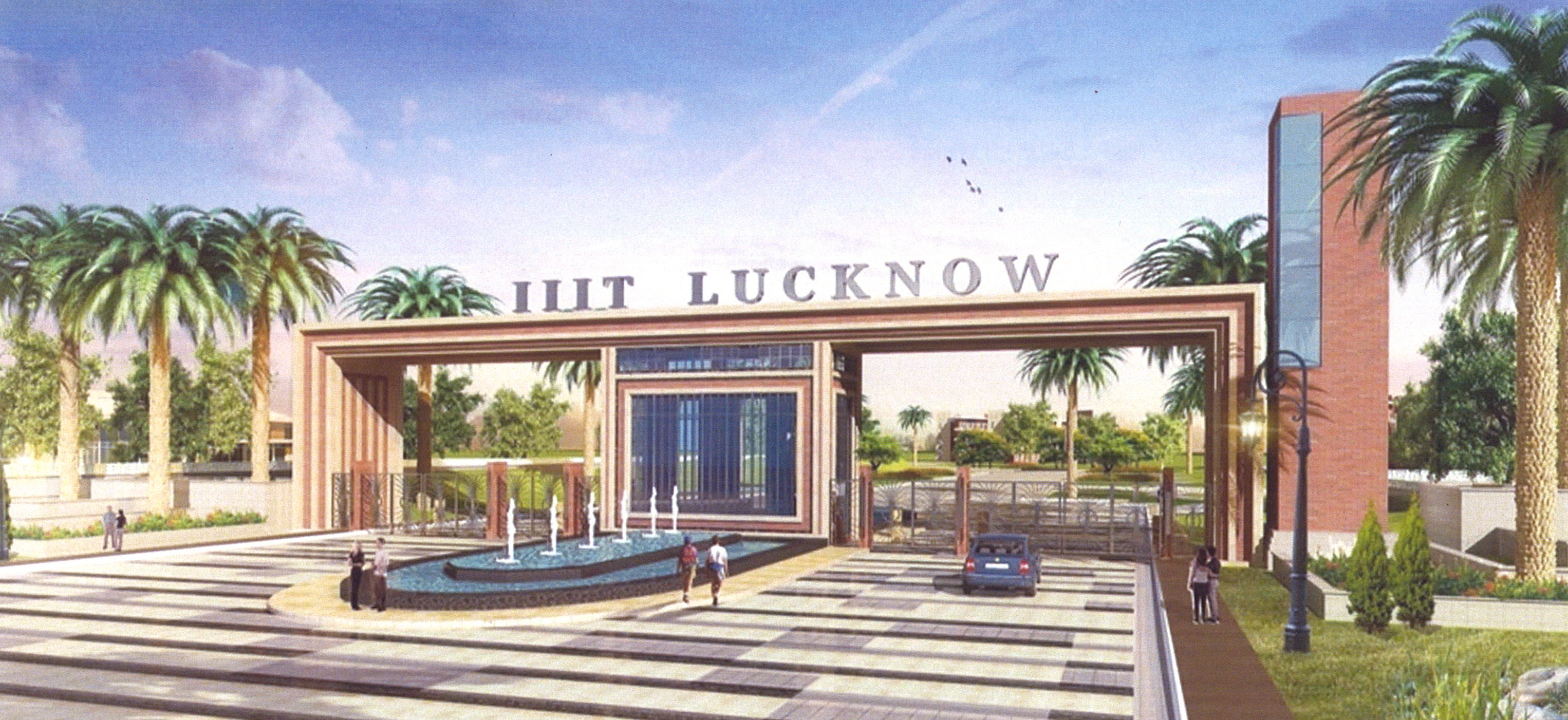
IIIT Lucknow entrance gate

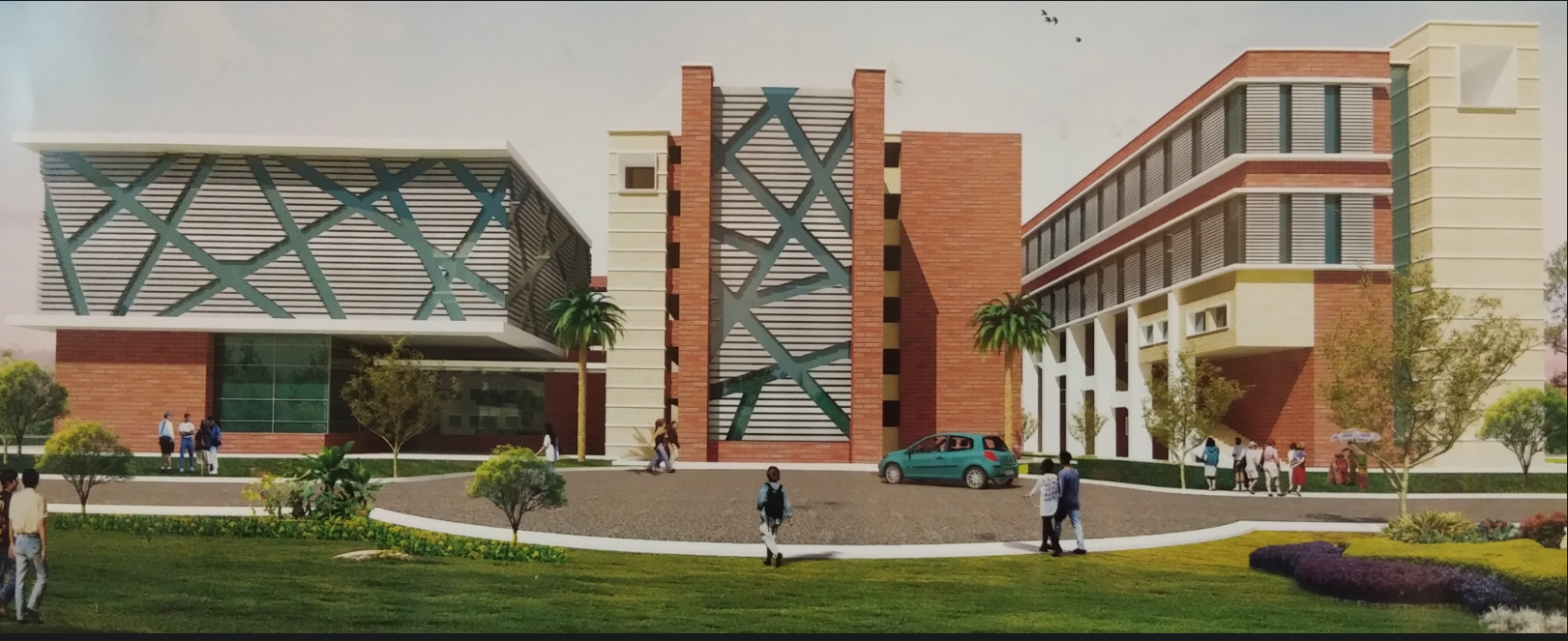
IIIT Lucknow main building

Indian Institute of Information Technology, Lucknow (IIIT Lucknow or IIITL) is a technical university, one of the Indian Institute of Information Technology, in Lucknow that focuses on Information Technology. It was established by the Ministry of Education (formerly the Ministry of Human Resource Development), Government of India in partnership with the Government of Uttar Pradesh and Uttar Pradesh Electronics Corporation as industry partner. It is a not-for-profit institution established in the Public-Private Partnership (PPP) model.

IIIT Lucknow is located in IT City, Lucknow, Uttar Pradesh. For its first academic session 2015–16, classes started from mentor Indian Institute of Information Technology, Allahabad's campus.

It offers four courses in Bachelor of Technology (BTech): Computer science, Information technology, Computer Science and Artificial intelligence, and Computer Science and Business; Master of Technology (MTech) in Computer Science; Master of Business Administration (MBA) in Digital Business; and a Doctor of Philosophy(PhD) program.

IIIT Lucknow also offers MSc programs in Data Science, AI and ML, Economics and Management. Admission to the MSc program at IIIT Lucknow is through the Joint Admission Test for Masters which is a common entrance test conducted every year for admission into post-graduate programs at Indian Institutes of Technology (IITs), Indian Institute of Science (IISc), Indian Institutes of Information Technology (IIITs) and National Institutes of Technology (NITs).

== Establishment ==
To address the challenges faced by the Indian IT industry and growth of the domestic IT market, the Ministry of Education, Government of India established twenty Indian Institutes of Information Technology (IIITs), on a Public Private Partnership (PPP) basis. The partners in setting up the IIITs are Ministry of Education, Governments of the respective States where each IIIT will be established, and industry partners.

The Indian Institute of Information Technology Lucknow (IIITL) was established with the approval of the Ministry of Education, Government of India. IIITL was approved by the Government of India's Ministry of Education. IIITL has been set up on a public–private partnership (PPP) basis. Dr. Arun Mohan Sherry the Former Chief Academic Officer of Narsee Monjee Institute of Management Sciences was appointed as the Founding Director of IIIT Lucknow. However, the institute's fees is relatively high since it is established in PPP mode making it a less preferred institute among students compared to its competitors like IIIT Allahabad and IIITM Gwalior.

== Academics ==
IIITL has an intake of 240 in the BTech program - 60 candidates each in Computer Science (CS), Computer Science & Artificial Intelligence (CSAI) Computer Science & Business (CSB), Information Technology (IT), as of 2021–22. MTech program has an intake of 30 candidates. The admission in BTech programmes is through the Joint Seat Allocation Authority (JoSAA). Post graduate students are admitted through Centralized Counselling For MTech (CCMT).

IIITL houses the following departments:

- Department of Computer Science
- Department of Information Technology
- Department of Mathematics
- Department of Management

IIITL has recently opened a research centre, i.e., Centre for Data Science and Artificial Intelligence (CDSAI).
