= Subrat Pathak =

Indian politician

Member of Parliament, Lok Sabha
- In office 23 May 2019 – 4 June 2024
- Preceded by: Dimple Yadav
- Succeeded by: Akhilesh Yadav
- Constituency: Kannauj, Uttar Pradesh

Personal details
- Born: 30 June 1979 (age 46) Kannauj, Uttar Pradesh, India
- Party: Bharatiya Janata Party
- Spouse: Neha Pathak
- Children: Kaustabh Pathak and Pranit Pathak

Subrat Pathak (born 30 June 1979) is an Indian politician. He was elected to the Lok Sabha, lower house of the Parliament of India from Kannauj, Uttar Pradesh defeating Dimple Yadav in the 2019 Indian general election as a member of the Bharatiya Janata Party. He is the General Secretary of Bharatiya Janata Party, Uttar Pradesh.

He was the former President of the Bharatiya Janata Party Youth Wing Bhartiya Janta Yuva Morcha.
