= Akhilesh Yadav =

Chief Minister of Uttar Pradesh from 2012 to 2017

Member of Parliament, Lok Sabha
- Incumbent
- Assumed office 4 June 2024
- Preceded by: Subrat Pathak
- Constituency: Kannauj, Uttar Pradesh
- In office 30 May 2019 – 22 March 2022
- Preceded by: Mulayam Singh Yadav
- Succeeded by: Dinesh Lal Yadav
- Constituency: Azamgarh, Uttar Pradesh
- In office 25 February 2000 – 2 May 2012
- Preceded by: Mulayam Singh Yadav
- Succeeded by: Dimple Yadav
- Constituency: Kannauj, Uttar Pradesh

Leader of Samajwadi Party in Lok Sabha
- Incumbent
- Assumed office 9 June 2024
- Deputy: Babu Singh Kushwaha
- Preceded by: S. T. Hasan

2nd President of the Samajwadi Party
- Incumbent
- Assumed office 1 January 2017
- Guidance Leader: Mulayam Singh Yadav (till October 2022)
- Preceded by: Mulayam Singh Yadav

32nd Leader of the Opposition in Uttar Pradesh Legislative Assembly
- In office 26 March 2022 – 11 June 2024
- Chief Minister: Yogi Adityanath
- Preceded by: Ram Govind Chaudhary
- Succeeded by: Mata Prasad Pandey

Member of Uttar Pradesh Legislative Assembly
- In office 10 March 2022 – 11 June 2024
- Preceded by: Sobaran Singh Yadav
- Succeeded by: Tej Pratap Singh Yadav
- Constituency: Karhal

20th Chief Minister of Uttar Pradesh
- In office 15 March 2012 – 19 March 2017
- Governor: Aziz Qureshi; Ram Naik
- Ministry & Departments: Home and Confidential; Appointment and Personnel; Finance; Energy; Excise; Higher Education; Secondary Education; Housing; Sugar & Cane Development; Industrial Development; General Administration; Other departments not allocated to a Minister.
- Preceded by: Kumari Mayawati
- Succeeded by: Yogi Adityanath

Member of Uttar Pradesh Legislative Council
- In office 6 May 2012 – 5 May 2018
- Preceded by: Kashinath Yadav
- Succeeded by: Vijay Bahadur Pathak
- Constituency: Elected by the MLAs

Personal details
- Born: 1 July 1973 (age 53) Saifai, Uttar Pradesh, India
- Party: Samajwadi Party
- Spouse: Dimple Rawat (m. 1999)
- Relations: Shivpal Singh Yadav (uncle)
- Children: 3
- Parent: Mulayam Singh Yadav (father)
- Education: University of Mysore (B.E.)
- Profession: Politician; civil engineer

Akhilesh Yadav (born 1 July 1973) is an Indian politician and national president of the Samajwadi Party, who served as the 20th Chief Minister of Uttar Pradesh from 2012 to 2017. Having assumed the chief minister's office at the age of 38, he is the youngest person to have held the office till date. He is the incumbent Member of Parliament for Kannauj in the 18th Lok Sabha, where he is the parliamentary party leader of Samajwadi Party. Earlier, he was elected as the Member of the Legislative Assembly for Karhal in the 18th Vidhan Sabha, before resigning and has also been the Leader of Opposition in the Uttar Pradesh Legislative Assembly from March 2022 to June 2024.

His first significant success in politics was being elected as the Member of the 13th Lok Sabha in the year 2000 (by-poll) for the Kannauj constituency. He is the son of Mulayam Singh Yadav, a veteran Indian politician and the founder of Samajwadi Party who served as Minister of Defence, Government of India and served three terms as the Chief Minister of Uttar Pradesh.

== Early life and education ==
Akhilesh Yadav was born on 1st July 1973 in Saifai, Etawah District, Uttar Pradesh to his mother, Malti Devi, and his father, Mulayam Singh Yadav, who later founded the Samajwadi Party (SP) and served as Chief Minister of Uttar Pradesh.

Yadav's mother, Malti Devi, suffered complications while giving birth to Akhilesh which put her in a vegetative state. She died in 2003. With Mulayam Singh busy making a career in politics, Akhilesh was raised mostly by his paternal grandparents, who were rural farmers with no formal education. They did not pay attention to his date of birth or give him a formal name. Because of this, Yadav, during his youth, was referred to as "Tipu", after Tipu Sultan, a name given to him by Darshan Singh, the pradhan of Saifai. Yadav only became known as "Akhilesh" after he chose the name for himself before being admitted to St. Mary's Convent in Etawah after an enrollment official recommended against using "Tipu" for the school roster. It was also during his enrollment at St. Mary's Convent that 1 July 1973 was reportedly chosen to serve as his date of birth.

Yadav's childhood education was split between two schools, one in Saifai and one in Etawah. He studied at St. Mary's Convent in Etawah until Class 3. He completed the remainder of his early education at Dholpur Military School in Rajasthan, and later obtained a bachelor's degree in Civil Engineering at the University of Mysore in Karnataka in 1995. The Hindu, The New York Times's India Ink, and the Samajwadi Party's website state that Yadav completed a master's degree in Civil Environmental Engineering at the University of Sydney in Australia in 1998.

In 1999 Yadav returned to India from Sydney, and shortly afterwards arranged to marry Dimple Rawat, who he had met in Lucknow in 1995. Yadav's father reportedly did not approve of the marriage initially. Mulayam Singh, however, was reportedly assuaged by Amar Singh, then general secretary for the SP and close confidante of Mulayam Singh, and the marriage was eventually able to go through in November 1999. Yadav, after returning to India, at first wished to pursue a career in engineering, but entered politics in 2000 at the urging of his father, only two months after his marriage, to compete in the Kannauj Lok Sabha by-elections. Both Yadav and his wife were caught off guard by the call for Yadav to run for MP, with the two having been in the process of packing for a vacation in South India at the time.

== Political career ==
=== Entry into politics & 13th Lok Sabha (2000-2004) ===
In 1999, Mulayam Singh Yadav contested and won the elections for both the Kannauj and Sambhal Lok Sabha constituencies. The Representation of the People Act, 1951 allows for candidates to run for two seats, but mandates that they resign from one or the other within fourteen days if they win both. Thus, he resigned from the Kannauj seat, and brought his son in to run for the seat and replace him. Mulayam Singh afterwards spearheaded Akhilesh's campaign, whose main opponents were Akbar Ahmad Dumpy of the Bahujan Samaj Party (BSP) and Shaitan Singh Shakya of the Rashtriya Kranti Party. Akhilesh won and was elected to the 13th Lok Sabha from Kannauj in a by-election in 2000, defeating Dumpy by over 58,000 votes.

During his first term as MP, he served as a member of the Committee on Ethics from 2000 to 2001, member of Committee on Science & Technology, Environment & Forests from 2002 to 2004, and earlier was also a member of the Committee on Food, Civil Supplies, and Public Distribution. During this period, Yadav would become involved in various altercations with members and supporters of the Bahujan Samaj Party and the Bharatiya Janata Party (BJP). This included Akhilesh allegedly being attacked by supporters of Ajay Yadav in Behva in 2002, and Akhilesh rushing and then pushing Ashok Chandel of the BSP in the Lok Sabha after Chandel called Mulayam Singh a "chor" (transl. thief) in 2003. Much of Yadav's time as MP during his first term was also spent signing recommendations for his supporters, with him stating, "They come to me with such high hopes. How can I let them down?". This practice was criticised by The Times of India, which also accused Yadav of being the beneficiary of nepotism and dynastic politics.

Yadav was appointed president of the Samajwadi Party's youth organisations in 2002. As president of the SP's youth organisations, he criticised both the Bharatiya Janata Party government in New Delhi and the Bahujan Samaj Party government in Lucknow for their education policy, which Yadav stated would "deprive many students from pursuing higher studies". He also played a role in the SP's campaign for the 2002 UP legislative assembly election, leading a rath yatra. Yadav also represented the SP at a Track-II diplomatic conference between Indian and Pakistani parties in Islamabad in August 2003.

=== Growing influence & 14th Lok Sabha (2004-2009) ===
In the 2004 Indian general elections, leveraging his position as the president of his party's youth wing, Yadav reportedly ensured that fifty-seven of the SP's candidates for the Lok Sabha were under forty-years of age. By this point, talk of Yadav succeeding his father, who was then Chief Minister of Uttar Pradesh, as CM given the scenario of the latter needing to move to Delhi after the 2004 elections, had already begun among many of his supporters in Kannauj, though his purported inexperience resulted in Shivpal Singh Yadav, Mulayam Singh's brother, still seeming to be the more likely successor to many in the case of an immediate succession. Akhilesh himself rejected talk of him succeeding his father, stating that he was "still too young to hold the CM's office" and that there were "a number of senior leaders in the party who deserve the post more". During the 2004 elections, he was elected as a member of the 14th Lok Sabha for the Kannauj constituency, winning the elections and securing a second term by a wide margin, as had been expected given the fact that Kannauj was an SP stronghold. He ran on a platform of promising development for peoples of all castes and religions as well as helping the marginalised, while at the same time criticising the Vajpayee government, accusing it of "betrayal" for failing to deliver on its promise of providing one crore (ten million) new jobs every year. His campaign was able to win over many Brahmin voters in Kannauj, as part of a broader shift among the Brahmin electorate away from the BJP as the Ram Janmabhoomi movement's influence over politics began to wane and conversely as disaffection with the Vajpayee government grew. With Yadav beginning to grow in stature within the party and gaining a following of his own, other SP candidates had come to be desirous of his aid in their respective campaigns. He would heed the requests of other candidates, and toured multiple constituencies beyond his own during the 2004 elections to aid fellow SP politicians in their election campaigns.

During his second term as MP, he was at varying points member of the following committees: the Committee on Urban Development, the Committee on Provision of Computers for MPs, Offices of Parties, Officers of Lok Sabha Secretariat, the Committee on Science and Technology, and the Committee on Environment and Forests. In February 2006, he was also appointed to a three-member committee with the task of probing Raj Babbar for a breach of discipline. During his second term, Yadav also became embroiled in a phone tapping scandal, which involved Amar Singh accusing INC leaders of tapping his phones and his conversations with other SP politicians, including Mulayam Singh and Akhilesh. The INC denied any involvement in the phone tapping, with Bhola Pandey, then the AICC secretary, accusing Yadav of being behind the tapping, which Pandey alleged was part of a plan to reduce Amar Singh's influence in the SP. Yadav continued to serve as a key campaigner for other SP candidates throughout this period, campaigning on behalf of S. Sheryar Khan in the 2005 Chamarajpet assembly constituency by-election, on behalf of Raj Kumar Chowdhary in the 2006 Rae Bareli Lok Sabha constituency by-election, and on behalf of SP's UP legislative assembly candidates in the 2007 elections.

In 2008, Yadav became involved in a protest against CM Mayawati's ban on conducting student elections in Uttar Pradesh. After protesting students were baton charged by the police and jailed, he started a sit-in outside the superintendent of police's residence. When Yadav and other protesters refused to vacate, they were detained, sparking a wave of protests across the state by SP party workers. After the BSP government refused to back down, the protests escalated, with government offices set on fire and police pelted with stones by protesters across the state. After Yadav's release, the agitation cooled down, but the arrest had the lingering effect of galvanizing the SP's cadre, providing them with motivation to work towards returning the SP to power in UP.

=== SP State Chief and 15th Lok Sabha (2009-2012) ===
In the 2009 general election, he contested and won elections in both the Kannauj and Firozabad Lok Sabha constituencies. While Yadav won both of his races, the SP as a whole did not fare as well as Mulayam Singh hoped during the election, going from thirty-six seats to twenty-three. Mulayam Singh therefore sacked Shivpal Singh, then UP party chief for the SP, a month after the conclusion of the election, and appointed Akhilesh as UP party chief in his stead. Deciding to keep his seat in Kannauj, Yadav resigned from his position of MP for Firozabad, and the SP selected his wife, Dimple Yadav, to run to replace him. Amar Singh played a key role in Dimple's selection, with him believing that she was the safest candidate to field given her ties to the Yadav family. Dimple would, however, lose the by-elections to Raj Babbar of the Indian National Congress by over 85,000 votes. This would occur after Rahul Gandhi directly campaigned for Babbar, which was described by The Times of India as being in violation of the "unspoken heartland rule of big-wigs skirting around each other's electoral turf." The loss of Firozabad was a hard blow to the SP, especially given the fact that the Yadav family's paternal ancestors originally hailed from the Firozabad district. The day after Dimple's defeat, Akhilesh would declare the beginning of a political rivalry with Gandhi, stating "till now, the SP-Congress battle was limited to seniors. But it is the first time that Rahul came here and campaigned against us. It is the beginning of a Rahul vs Akhilesh contest".

Dimple's defeat in Firozabad sparked internal dissent within the SP. Amar Singh, unhappy with the party's electoral performance, publicly criticised the party's strategy. Many of the SP's cadre, however, conversely blamed Singh for the party's string of recent defeats. This internal dissent eventually escalated into a public split between Singh and Ram Gopal Yadav. Akhilesh too was unhappy with Singh's public criticism of party strategy. Singh afterwards resigned from all of his party posts in January 2010. Raj Babbar claimed that it was Yadav's growing influence in the party, backed by Ram Gopal, that prompted this resignation. In February 2010 Singh was expelled from the party, being deemed a "communalist, feudal, and capitalist intruder" who had launched an "attempt to sully the party's secular and socialist image" by SP leadership. Yadav supported this expulsion, and was the one to convince his father to cast Singh out of the party. Singh's expulsion proved to be beneficial for the party, as he became a useful scapegoat that the party could blame its recent misfortunes on, while also paving the way for Yadav's influence in the party to grow further.

From 2009 to 2012, Yadav served as a member of the 15th Lok Sabha. During this period he was a member of the following committees: Member of the Committee on Environment and Forests, Committee on Science and Technology, and the JPC on the 2G spectrum case. In the aftermath of the 2009 Firozabad by-election, Yadav began personally interviewing prospective SP candidates for the 2012 UP legislative assembly elections. In February 2011, he was formally elected UP state president of the SP.

On 9 March 2011, after landing in the Amausi Airport in Lucknow, Yadav, having been set to lead a protest against the ruling BSP, was arrested and jailed. A senior police officer stated that since "prohibitory orders are in place in the state capital", Yadav was "arrested as a preventive measure". His supporters staged protests soon afterwards, gathering at Hazratganj and burning BSP flags, with the police responding by conducting a baton charge against the protesters. Yadav was released the next day. He condemned his arrest as proof that the BSP government was "functioning in an autocratic manner". Within the next ten days, Yadav was detained by the police twice more.

=== 2012 election ===
As the 2012 Uttar Pradesh legislative assembly elections grew closer, many within the SP recognized that change was needed after the party's defeat in the 2009 Firozabad by-election and its overall poorer than hoped performances in the 2009 general election and the 2007 UP legislative assembly election. If the party did poorly in the 2012 elections as well, the party risked its cadre becoming increasingly demoralised. Yadav thus commissioned a series of surveys among voters, which showed that voters now associated the SP's rule with goonda raj (transl. rule by goons), a sentiment which Yadav hoped to abate before the elections. He also recruited numerous professionals to aid the SP's campaign, including Nikhil Kamat, Neelesh Mishra, and Arjun Sablok. Mishra wrote songs for the campaign and invented the slogan "Ummeed ki Cycle" (transl. the cycle of hope), in reference to the SP's electoral symbol, and Sablok directed the SP's ad campaign. This marked a departure from the party's previous image of one of "muscle power", with Yadav stating that "It is time for us, the people of Uttar Pradesh, to put the bitterness of the past behind us, and look forward to days of new hope, of a new ummeed."

To campaign for the election, Yadav led the three-month long Samajwadi Kranti Rath Yatra across the state, which his father had personally gone about planning for him. The yatra began in September 2011, and traveled the same path as Mulayam Singh's 1987 yatra. Its start was marked by support from the major leaders of the SP, with Shivpal Singh making a donation of Rs 5 lakh to the yatra, and with Mohan Singh and Azam Khan praising Yadav and expressing confidence in the campaign's victory. The SP hoped that having Yadav lead the yatra would aid in showing the public that the party was making a change towards a platform focused on governance, technology, and politics as opposed to its traditional anti-computer and anti-English image. The party also hoped that Yadav would be able to counter Rahul Gandhi's campaigning in the state. To these ends, the yatra adopted the message "Vikas ki Ganga bahane ko, ab brashtachar mitane ko, kranti rath par ho sawar, nikal pada hai Samajwad" (transl. To unleash the river of development and put an end to corruption, socialism has embarked upon its march atop the chariot of revolution).

Yadav worked closely with student leaders during the election, including Anand Bhadauria, national president of the SP's Lohiya Vahini, Sunil Yadav, leader of the Samajwadi Chatra Sabha, Nafis Ahmed, former president of the Aligarh Muslim University Students' Union, and Naeem-ul Hasan, former leader of the Jamia Millia Islamia. The involvement of all of these figures helped Yadav achieve success in winning over the youth vote. Sunil Yadav in particular became a close confidante of Akhilesh, a relationship which would continue into Yadav's chief ministership.

A few months prior to the 2012 election, D.P. Yadav, who had a reputation as a ganglord, attempted to join the SP through the aid of Azam Khan. Akhilesh, hoping to end the SP's reputation as a party of the goonda raj, leveraged his role as UP party chief to bar D.P. from entering the party. Mohan Singh, national spokesperson for the SP, publicly came out in support of D.P. joining the party, as he believed that D.P. would sway Yadav votes in the districts of Sambhal, Badayun, and Amroha, contradicting Akhilesh's previous statements. Singh was consequently sacked from his position as national spokesperson by Mulayam Singh for publicly disagreeing with his son, and the position was filled by Ram Gopal. Mulayam Singh, through this sacking, reportedly hoped to establish that the SP was contesting the 2012 elections under the banner of Akhilesh Yadav, and that his son's decision could not be questioned.

Yadav's rejection of D.P. helped assuage concerns of goonda raj among many voters, though his contrasting acceptance of Bhagwan Sharma into the party has been criticised. Sharma had been accused of rape, intimidation, and fraud, and was expelled by the BSP in 2011, before subsequently being accepted into the SP and given a ticket. Yadav and Shivpal Singh defended the acceptance of Sharma into the SP, stating that the charges against Sharma were false. Sharma's brother, Mukesh, who was allegedly involved in Sharma's crimes, was also accepted into the SP and given the ticket from Shikarpur. Sharma was later found guilty of threatening a political rival during his 2011 electoral campaign, and was jailed for 14 months. Yadav was similarly criticised for the SP giving tickets to Mehboob Ali and Abhay Singh.

Yadav's effort to build a new welfare-focused and development-oriented image for the SP succeeded in bringing victory to the party. In the 2012 elections, the SP won 224 seats, securing the largest majority of any party besides the INC in the history of Uttar Pradesh. On 10 March 2012, Yadav was elected leader of the Samajwadi Legislature Party, and therefore Chief Minister-elect, in Uttar Pradesh. On 15 March 2012, at the age of 38, he became the Chief Minister of Uttar Pradesh, the youngest to hold the office. In May 2012 Yadav resigned from the Kannauj parliamentary seat to further serve as the Chief Minister of Uttar Pradesh after his party won the Assembly elections. In the same month he became Member of the Uttar Pradesh Legislative council.

=== Post-chief ministership ===
In the 2017 Assembly elections, the SP-Congress Alliance headed by Yadav was unable to form the government. He submitted his resignation to Governor Ram Naik on 11 March.

The 2019 Indian general elections and 2022 Uttar Pradesh Legislative Assembly elections saw Yadav being elected to the parliament and state assembly simultaneously, with Yadav later retaining his state assembly seat, and thereby submitting his resignation in the Lok Sabha.

In the 2024 Indian general election Yadav was elected to the 18th Lok Sabha from Kannauj. This victory marked a significant return to the Lok Sabha for Yadav, who had previously represented the Kannauj constituency in 2000, 2004, and 2009. Under his leadership, the Samajwadi Party alliance won 43 seats, recording the party’s strongest-ever performance in a general election and emerging as the third-largest party in the Lok Sabha. The outcome established the Samajwadi Party as the largest party in Uttar Pradesh and marked a significant electoral setback for the Bharatiya Janata Party in the state.

== Chief Minister of Uttar Pradesh ==
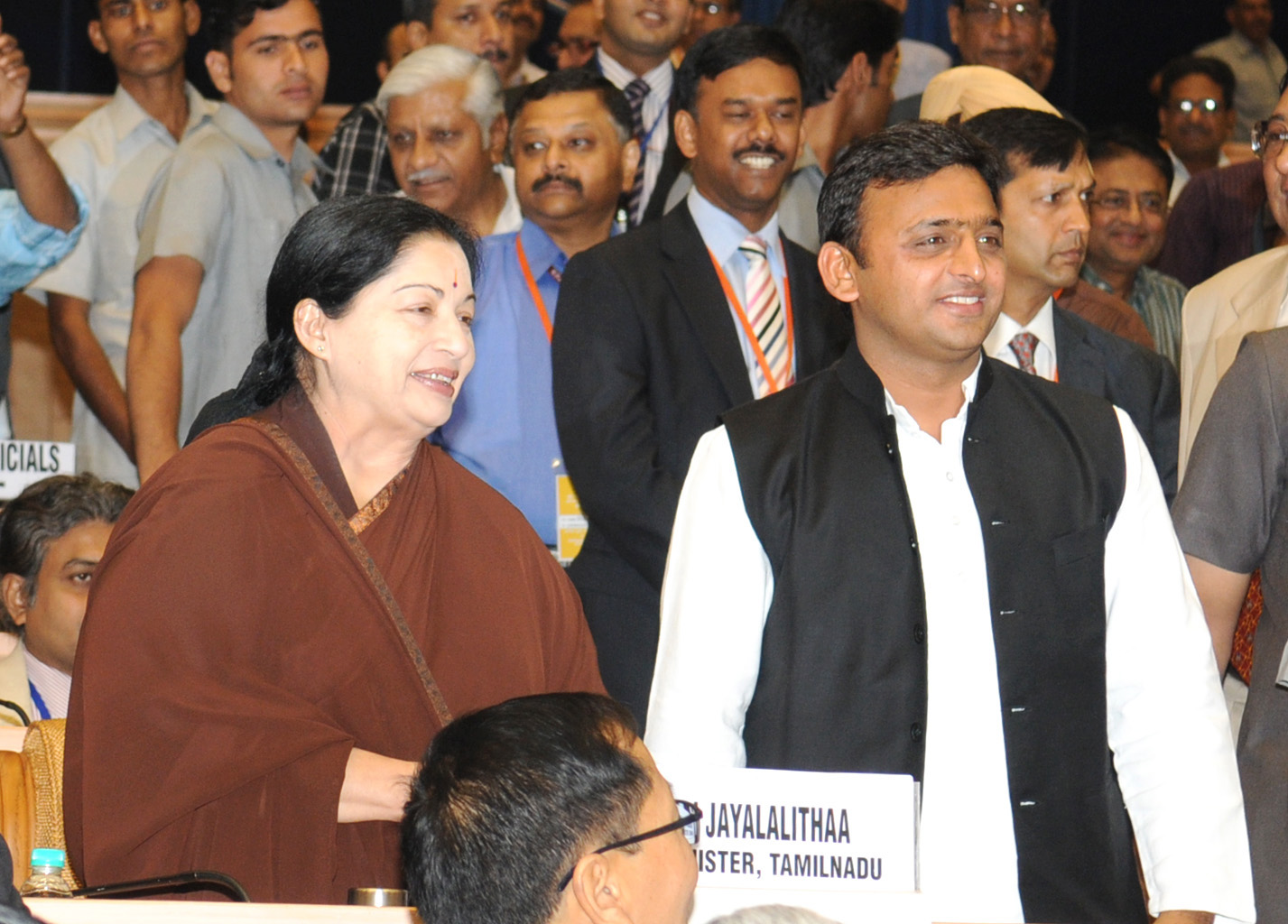
Akhilesh with Tamil Nadu Chief Minister Jayalalithaa in April 2012

Yadav was sworn in as the 20th Chief Minister of Uttar Pradesh on 15 March 2012, aged 38, winning 224 seats in the March 2012 assembly elections. During his tenure, the Agra-Lucknow Expressway, the longest expressway in India at that time, was inaugurated. Yadav also launched the "UP100 Police Service", "Women Power Line 1090" and "108 Ambulance Service". Projects like the Lucknow Metro Rail, Lucknow International Ekana Cricket Stadium, Janeshwar Mishra Park (Asia's largest park), Jayaprakash Narayan International Convection Center, IT city were inaugurated. His chief ministerial tenure saw emphasis on setting up Kisan Bazaars and Mandis, introducing social welfare schemes such as Lohiya Awas Yojana, Kanya Vidya Dhan, Kisan Avam Sarvhit Bima Yojana, Pension Yojna and allotting unemployment allowances. Between 2012 and 2015, over 15 Lakh laptops were distributed to the 10th and 12th passout students by the Government of Uttar Pradesh, making it one of the largest distribution schemes by any government in the world.

== Positions held ==
Akhilesh Yadav has been elected 1 time as MLA and 5 times as Lok Sabha MP.

#	From	To	Position	Party
1.	2000	2004	MP (1st term) in 13th Lok Sabha from Kannauj (by-poll)	SP
2.	2004	2009	MP (2nd term) in 14th Lok Sabha from Kannauj	SP
3.	2009	2012	MP (3rd term) in 15th Lok Sabha from Kannauj (resigned in 2012) and Firozabad (resigned in 2009)	SP
4.	2012	2018	MLC (1st term) in Uttar Pradesh Legislative Council; Chief Minister (1st term) in Government of UP (2012–2017)	SP
5.	2019	2022	MP (4th term) in 17th Lok Sabha from Azamgarh (resigned in 2022)	SP
6.	2022	12 June 2024	MLA (1st term) from Karhal; Leader of the Opposition of Uttar Pradesh Legislative Assembly	SP
7.	2024	Present	Member of the 18th Lok Sabha (5th time) from Kannauj	SP

== Election history ==
=== Lok Sabha ===
Year	Constituency	Party	Votes	%	Opponent	Opponent party	Opponent votes	%	Result	Margin	%
2000*	Kannauj	SP	3,06,054	43.1	Akbar Ahmad Dumpy	BSP	2,47,329	34.8	Won	58,725	8.3
2004	Kannauj	SP	4,64,367	61.21	Thakur Rajesh Singh	BSP	1,56,994	20.69	Won	3,07,373	40.52
2009	Kannauj	SP	3,56,895	48.1	Mahesh Chandra Verma	BSP	1,91,887	25.86	Won	1,65,008	22.24
2009	Firozabad	SP	2,87,011	41.9	S. P. Singh Baghel	BSP	2,19,710	32.1	Won	67,301	9.8
2019	Azamgarh	SP	6,21,578	60.04	Dinesh Lal Yadav 'Nirahua'	BJP	3,61,704	35.1	Won	2,59,874	24.94
2024	Kannauj	SP	6,42,292	52.74	Subrat Pathak	BJP	4,71,370	38.71	Won	1,70,922	14.03

- (*) denotes by-election

=== Member of Legislative Assembly (Uttar Pradesh) ===
Year	Constituency	Party	Votes	%	Opponent	Opponent party	Opponent votes	%	Result	Margin	%
2022	Karhal	SP	148,196	60.12	Prof. S.P. Singh Baghel	BJP	80,692	32.74	Won	67,504	27.38

== Personal life ==
Akhilesh Yadav is married to Dimple Yadav, a Member of Parliament. The couple has three children; two daughters: Aditi and Tina, and a son, Arjun. Akhilesh is a civil engineer, agriculturist, and socio-political worker. He has a keen interest in sports, mainly football and cricket. His favourite pastimes are reading, listening to music, and watching films.

Since Yadav became chief minister, his family was divided into two feuding groups, one siding with him and the other with his uncle Shivpal Singh Yadav. Akhilesh had the support of his father's cousin, Ram Gopal Yadav, while Shivpal later founded his own political party, the Pragatisheel Samajwadi Party (Lohia), which ahead of 2022 elections again merged with Samajwadi Party, with Shivpal being elected as an MLA on a Samajwadi Party ticket.

== See also ==
- List of chief ministers of Uttar Pradesh

Lok Sabha
Preceded by Mulayam Singh Yadav	Member of Parliament for Kannauj; 2000 – 2012	Succeeded by Dimple Yadav
Preceded by Mulayam Singh Yadav	Member of Parliament for Azamgarh; 2019 – 2022	Succeeded by Dinesh Lal Yadav
Preceded by Subrat Pathak	Member of Parliament for Kannauj; 2024 – Present	Incumbent
Uttar Pradesh Legislative Council
Preceded by Kashinath Yadav	Member of Legislative Council for MLA constituency 2012 – 2018	Succeeded by Vijay Bahadur Pathak
Uttar Pradesh Legislative Assembly
Preceded by Sobaran Singh Yadav	Member of Legislative Assembly for Karhal; 2022 – 2024	Succeeded by Tej Pratap Singh Yadav
Political offices
Preceded by Mayawati	Chief Minister of Uttar Pradesh; 15 March 2012 – 20 March 2017	Succeeded by Yogi Adityanath
Preceded by Ram Govind Chaudhary	Leader of the Opposition in Uttar Pradesh Legislative Assembly; 26 March 2022 – 11 June 2024	Succeeded by Mata Prasad Pandey
Preceded by Babu Singh Kushwaha	Leader of Samajwadi Party in Lok Sabha; 9 June 2024 – Present	Incumbent
Party political offices
Preceded by Mulayam Singh Yadav	President; Samajwadi Party; 1 January 2017 – Present	Incumbent
