= Kannauj Lok Sabha constituency =

Constituency of the Indian parliament in Uttar Pradesh

Coordinates: 27.05°N 79.92°E

Kannauj UP-42
- Lok Sabha constituency
- Interactive Map Outlining Kannauj Lok Sabha constituency

Constituency details
- Country: India
- Region: North India
- State: Uttar Pradesh
- Assembly constituencies: Chhibramau; Tirwa; Kannauj; Bidhuna; Rasulabad
- Established: 1967
- Reservation: None

Member of Parliament
- 18th Lok Sabha
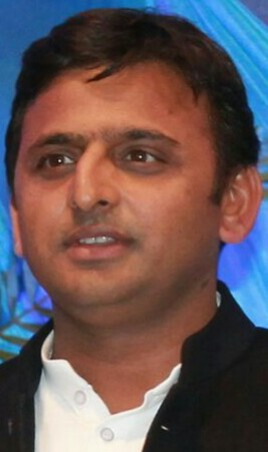
- Incumbent Akhilesh Yadav; President of the Samajwadi Party
- Party: Samajwadi Party
- Elected year: 2024

Kannauj is a Lok Sabha parliamentary constituency in Uttar Pradesh.

== Assembly segments ==
No	Name	District	Member	Party	2024 Lead
196	Chhibramau	Kannauj	Archana Pandey	BJP	SP
197	Tirwa	Kannauj	Kailash Singh Rajput	BJP	SP
198	Kannauj (SC)	Kannauj	Asim Arun	BJP	SP
202	Bidhuna	Auraiya	Rekha Verma	SP	SP
205	Rasulabad (SC)	Kanpur Dehat	Poonam Sankhwar	BJP	SP

== Members of Parliament ==
Samajwadi Party is the most successful political party in Kannauj Lok Sabha elections.
1. SP (8 terms) (47.1%)
2. BJP (2 terms) (11.8%)
3. INC (2 terms) (11.8%)
4. JP (2 terms) (11.8%)
5. SSP (1 term) (5.88%)
6. JD (1 term) (5.88%)
7. JP(S) (1 term) (5.88%)

Year	Elected MP	Party
1967	Ram Manohar Lohia	Samyukta Socialist Party
1971	Satya Narayan Misra	Indian National Congress
1977	Ram Prakash Tripathi	Janata Party
1980	Chhotey Singh Yadav	Janata Party (Secular)
1984	Sheila Dikshit	Indian National Congress
1989	Chhotey Singh Yadav	Janata Dal
1991	Chhotey Singh Yadav	Janata Party
1996	Chandra Bhushan Singh	Bharatiya Janata Party
1998	Pradeep Yadav	Samajwadi Party
1999	Mulayam Singh	Samajwadi Party
2000^	Akhilesh Yadav	Samajwadi Party
2004	Akhilesh Yadav	Samajwadi Party
2009	Akhilesh Yadav	Samajwadi Party
2012^	Dimple Yadav	Samajwadi Party
2014	Dimple Yadav	Samajwadi Party
2019	Subrat Pathak	Bharatiya Janata Party
2024	Akhilesh Yadav	Samajwadi Party

^ by poll

== Election results ==
=== 2024 ===
2024 Indian general elections: Kannauj
Party	Candidate	Votes	%	±%
SP	Akhilesh Yadav	642,292	52.74	▲4.45
BJP	Subrat Pathak	471,370	38.71	▼10.66
BSP	Imran bin Zafar	81,639	6.70	▲6.70
NOTA	None of the Above	4,818	0.40	▼0.32
Majority		1,70,922	14.03	▲12.95
Turnout		12,17,833	61.23	▲0.37
SP gain from BJP		Swing		

=== 2019 ===
2019 Indian general election: Kannauj
Party	Candidate	Votes	%	±%
BJP	Subrat Pathak	563,087	49.37	+7.26
SP	Dimple Yadav	5,50,734	48.29	+4.40
NOTA	None of the Above	8,165	0.72	+0.06
Majority		12,353	1.08	
Turnout		11,40,985	60.86	−0.76
BJP gain from SP		Swing	+5.48	

=== 2014 ===
2014 Indian general elections: Kannauj
Party	Candidate	Votes	%	±%
SP	Dimple Yadav	489,164	43.89	−1.63
BJP	Subrat Pathak	4,69,256	42.11	+21.78
BSP	Nirmal Tiwari	1,27,785	11.47	−18.44
Independent	Rakesh Kumar Tiwari	5,723	0.51	New
AAP	Imran Bin Zafar	4,826	0.43	New
NOTA	None of the Above	7,380	0.66	New
Majority		19,907	1.78	−13.83
Turnout		11,14,576	61.62	+12.30
SP hold		Swing	-1.63	

=== 2012 bye-election ===
Bye-election, 2012: Kannauj
Party	Candidate	Votes	%	±%
SP	Dimple Yadav	Unopposed		
SP hold		Swing		

=== General election 2009 ===
2009 Indian general elections: Kannauj
Party	Candidate	Votes	%	±%
SP	Akhilesh Yadav	356,895	48.10	
BSP	Dr. Mahesh Chandra Verma	1,91,887	25.86	
BJP	Subrat Pathak	1,50,872	20.33	
BSP(K)	Balram	6,650	0.90	
IND.	Shrikrishna Shakya	5,310	0.72	
Majority		1,65,008	22.24	
Turnout		7,41,950	40.32	
SP hold		Swing		

=== 2004 ===
2004 Indian general elections: Kannauj
Party	Candidate	Votes	%	±%
SP	Akhilesh Yadav	4,64,367	61.21	
BSP	Thakur Rajesh Singh	1,56,994	20.69	
BJP	Ramanand Yadav	1,12,349	14.81	
INC	Vinay Kumar Shukla	10,501	1.38	
Independent	Satya Prakash Raja	5,057	0.67	
Majority		3,07,373	40.52	
Turnout		7,58,627	56.33	
SP hold		Swing		

=== Bye Election 2000 ===
Bye Election, 2000: Kannauj
Party	Candidate	Votes	%	±%
SP	Akhilesh Yadav	3,06,054	43.10	
BSP	Akbar Ahmad Dumpy	2,47,329	34.80	
RTKP	Prof. Shaitan Singh Shakya	98,372	13.80	
ABLTC	Pratima Chaturvedi	22,541	3.02	
Independent	Suresh Chandra	10,402	1.40	
Majority		58,725	8.30	
Turnout		7,10,082	61.46	
SP hold		Swing		

=== 1999 ===
1999 Indian general election: Kannauj
Party	Candidate	Votes	%	±%
SP	Mulayam Singh Yadav	2,91,617	42.63	
ABLTC	Arvind Pratap Singh	2,12,478	31.06	
BSP	Sughar Singh Pal	1,18,492	17.32	
INC	Digvijay Narain Singh	27,082	3.96	
IND.	Radhey Shyam	10,268	1.50	
Majority		79,139	11.57	
Turnout		6,84,085	59.11	
SP hold		Swing		

=== General election 1996 ===
1996 Indian general election: Kannauj
Party	Candidate	Votes	%	±%
BJP	Chandra Bhushan Singh	2,19,039	37.68	
SP	Chhotey Singh Yadav	1,64,159	28.24	
BSP	Bhagwandin Shakya	1,54,586	26.59	
INC	Ram Avtar Dixit	9,957	1.71	
IND.	Shri Prakash	9,773	1.68	
Majority		54,880	9.44	
Turnout		5,81,285	50.96	
BJP gain from JP		Swing		

== See also ==
- Kannauj
- List of constituencies of the Lok Sabha
