= Dimple Yadav =

Indian politician (born 1978)

Member of Parliament, Lok Sabha
- Incumbent
- Assumed office 5 December 2022
- Preceded by: Mulayam Singh Yadav
- Constituency: Mainpuri, Uttar Pradesh
- In office 8 August 2012 – 23 May 2019
- Preceded by: Akhilesh Yadav
- Succeeded by: Subrat Pathak
- Constituency: Kannauj, Uttar Pradesh

Personal details
- Born: Dimple Rawat; 15 January 1978 (age 48) Pune, Maharashtra, India
- Party: Samajwadi Party
- Spouse: Akhilesh Yadav (m. 1999)
- Relations: Mulayam Yadav family
- Children: 3
- Education: Lucknow University
- Profession: Politician

Dimple Yadav (née Rawat; born 15 January 1978; Hindi pronunciation: [ɖɪmpəl jaːd̪əʋ]) is an Indian politician and the incumbent Member of Parliament from Mainpuri of Uttar Pradesh. She has earlier been a member of the Lok Sabha for two terms from Kannauj and currently serving a second term from Mainpuri Lok Sabha constituency.

Yadav is married to Samajwadi Party president and former Uttar Pradesh Chief Minister, Akhilesh Yadav, and is as such the daughter-in-law of Mulayam Singh Yadav, former Defence Minister of India, former Chief Minister of Uttar Pradesh and founder-patron of the Samajwadi Party.

== Early life and education ==
Dimple Rawat was born on 15 January 1978 in Pune, Maharashtra. She is the second of three daughters of retired Indian Army Col. Ram Chandra Singh Rawat and Champa Rawat. Her family is originally from Uttarakhand. She was educated in Pune, Bathinda and Andaman and Nicobar Islands. Her formal education took place in Army Public School, Nehru Road, Lucknow. She graduated in commerce from Lucknow University.

== Personal life ==
Dimple Rawat met Akhilesh Yadav when she was a student. Originally, Yadav's family was opposed to their marriage, but they agreed after his grandmother, Murti Devi approved. The couple got married on 24 November 1999 when she was 21. The couple have two daughters - Aditi Yadav and Tina Yadav and a son Arjun Yadav.

== Political career ==
Yadav unsuccessfully contested the by-election for the Lok Sabha constituency of Firozabad in 2009 against actor-turned-politician Raj Babbar. The by-election was triggered by her husband, who had won two seats in the May 2009 General Elections, in both Firozabad and Kannauj, opting to retain the Kannauj seat. She was elected unopposed from the Kannauj constituency to the Lok Sabha in 2012, after her husband caused another by-election by vacating the seat to enter the Uttar Pradesh Legislative Council.

Yadav became the 44th person in the country and only the fourth in Uttar Pradesh since the Independence of India to be elected unopposed. This situation arose when two candidates, Dashrath Singh Shankwar (Samyukt Samajwadi Dal) and Sanju Katiyar (Independent), withdrew their nominations. Bharatiya Janata Party and Indian National Congress had not nominated any candidates for the by-election; though the BJP clarified later that their candidate missed his train so he failed to reach in time to file his nomination.

This made her the first woman from Uttar Pradesh to get elected unopposed in a Lok Sabha by-election, and second person after Purshottam Das Tandon's election from Allahabad West in 1952. She became the only woman MP whose husband was Chief Minister, and also one whose father-in-law was also a member of the same House.

Yadav retained Kannauj Lok Sabha seat in 2014 Indian General Election by defeating the nearest rival by 19,907 votes. In 2019 Indian General Election, she contested as a joint candidate of the Samajwadi Party and Bahujan Samaj Party, but lost to BJP's Subrat Pathak with a margin of more than 10,000 votes.

After the death of her father-in-law Mulayam Singh Yadav, Dimple Yadav was fielded from the vacant Mainpuri Lok Sabha constituency seat, which she won by defeating BJP's candidate with over 2.8 lakh votes.

In 2024, Dimple Yadav retained Mainpuri Lok Sabha seat which she won with a margin victory of 2,21,639 votes, defeating the BJP's Jayveer Singh. Dimple won by securing 5,98,526 votes, while Jayveer Singh, managed 3,76,887 votes. The seat has been with the Samajwadi Party since 1996 and its journey of victories is marked by a series of electoral wins.

#	From	To	Positions	Party
1.	2012	2014	MP (1st term) in 15th Lok Sabha from Kannauj (by-poll)	SP
2.	2014	2019	MP (2nd term) in 16th Lok Sabha from Kannauj	SP
3.	2022	2024	MP (3rd term) in 17th Lok Sabha from Mainpuri (by-poll)	SP
4.	2024	Present	MP (4th term) in 18th Lok Sabha from Mainpuri	SP

Lok Sabha
Preceded by Akhilesh Yadav	Member of Parliament for Kannauj; 2012–2019	Succeeded by Subrat Pathak
Preceded by Mulayam Singh Yadav	Member of Parliament for Kannauj; 2022–present	Incumbent
