= Darshan Singh Yadav =

Indian politician

MP of Rajya Sabha for Uttar Pradesh
- In office 3 April 2012 – 2 April 2018
- Constituency: Uttar Pradesh

Personal details
- Born: 30 July 1944 Hainwara, Etawah
- Died: 30 August 2018 (aged 74) Etawah
- Party: Samajwadi Party
- Spouse: Shakuntala Devi
- Relations: Sobaran Singh Yadav (brother)
- Children: 3
- Education: Agra University

Darshan Singh Yadav was a politician from Samajwadi Party was a Member of the Parliament of India representing Uttar Pradesh in the Rajya Sabha, the upper house of the Indian Parliament.

He has completed his B.Com. at A.K. College at Shikohabad under Agra University.

He died on 30 August 2018.
