= Dr. Ram Manohar Lohia Park, Gomti Nagar =

Park in Lucknow, India

Dr. Ram Manohar Lohia Park
- Interactive map of Dr. Ram Manohar Lohia Park
- Type: Public park
- Location: Gomti Nagar in Lucknow, Uttar Pradesh, India
- Coordinates: 26°50′21.66″N 80°59′38.28″E
- Area: 76 acres (31 ha)
- Elevation: 109.00 metres (357.61 ft)
- Created: 2007
- Operator: Lucknow Development Authority
- Status: Open year round
- Website: www.ldalucknow.co.in

Dr Ram Manohar Lohia Park is developed by the Lucknow Development Authority in the Vipin Khand area of Gomti Nagar locality in the memory of great socialist Dr. Ram Manohar Lohia. The total area of the park is 76 acres.

== The Courtyard ==
There are total four courtyards. All the entrances have ticket counters.

== Parking ==
All the entrance courtyards are equipped with ample parking space with a capacity to park 60-100 vehicles each.

== Public Utility Area ==
All the four entry points of the park have public utility block

== Main Navigation Path (4.5 wide and 1km long) ==
Starting from the South-East corner of the park, the Main Navigation Path goes through the centre and ends at the North-East corner, measuring around 1 kilometre in length and 4.50 metres in width. The Main Navigation Path which is made up of Kota stones flooring also has a 50 cm strip in the middle of the path where seasonal flowers are grown. Special architectural lights on designer polls can be seen all around the navigation path.

== Light Beam Pathways ==
Right from the entrance there are pathways in various directions of the park along with natural mounds, flower nursery and other areas. It looks like a light spreading in various directions. The total length of these light beam path is 2.7 kilometres and it is made up of vitrified tile along with white sandstone strips in the middle.

== Semi-circular path ==
The semi-circual path situated near the main memorial area is almost 500 metres long, also six memory columns and walls are situated along the semi-circular path. The walls have been engraved with the thoughts of Dr. Ram Manohar Lohiya, while the columns have life and work of Mr. Madhu Limye, Mr. Raj Narayan, Mr. Karpuri Thakur, Mr. Badri Vishal Pitti, Mama Baleshwar Dayal and Mr. Ram Sewak Yadav, engraved on them.

== Synthetic Jogging Track ==
There are two state of the art synthetic jogging tracks in the park. The first track is of 340 metres in length and 2.70 metre wide, while the second track is 440 metres long and 3 metre wide.

== Jogging Track ==
There are two jogging tracks in the park which are made up of sand soil. The first track is 365 metres long and 2.4 metres wide, while the second track is 400 metres long and 2.4 metres wide.

== Acupressure track ==
There is also a modern acupressure track near the entrance courtyard number two. The length of this acupressure track is 100 metres and width is 2.40 metres.

== Water Body ==
A lake of area 15,277 square metre is situated in the background of the idol of Dr Ram Manohar Lohia. The flooring of the lake is made up of rectified glazed ceramic tiles. There are four floating fountains in the lake and each fountain is 12 metres.

== Fish/Duck Pond ==
The Fish and Duck Pond is divided in two parts. In the first part there are multi-colour small fishes, while the other part is reserved for ducks.

== Swings and Benches ==
There are many types of latest swings installed in the park for the entertainment of children, also benches are installed to provide rest to the park goers.

== Open Exercise Area ==
Keeping in view, the health and fitness of the people coming to park there seven machines installed in the open area near synthetic jogging track.

== Amphitheatre ==
To cater the need of social and cultural functions, there is a stage with a main diameter of 30 metres. This amphitheatre is situated near the entrance courtyard number two. Clock Tower is also located near this amphitheatre. There is a provision of reserving this amphitheatre in two categories. First category is Non Commercial and under this category the rent is 11,000 Rs per day. While the second category is Commercial, where one has to pay 21,000 Rs per day. Dr. Lohia Memorial Column

Keeping in mind the principles of Dr Ram Manohar Lohia's four pillar rule, four massive columns of 25 metre height each are constructed.

== Flower Garden ==
Just near the main memorial area a flower garden is located in the area of 2 acres. This garden is always blooming with seasonal flowers, also there is a baradari located in the middle of the garden.

== Rain Water Harvesting ==
A unique system for Rain Water Harvesting has been installed in the park. A recharge trench of 805 metres and 29 deep bores have been installed to cater to the Rain Water Harvesting system.

== Tree Plantation ==
Mainly covered with green trees and flowers, Dr Ram Manohar Lohia Park houses more than 50 different species of trees. Taking both small and big trees in count, there are almost 15000 trees planted in the park. Also 2 lac square ft green lawn is developed in the park. The species of the trees planted in the park are:-

No	Botanical/English Name	Common name of Plant	Family
	Tree		
	Adensonia Digitata	Kalp taru/Kalp vriksha	Malvaceae
	Albizia lebbeck		Fabaceae
	Alstonia scholaris	Saptparni	Apocynaceae
	Ashoka serpense		
	Azadirechta indica	Neem	Meliaceae
	Bahunia Galpini	Lal kachnar	Fabaceae
	Bahunia purpurea	Purple kachnar	Caesalpiniaceae
	Bahunia tomentosa	Pila kachnar	Fabaceae
	Budhha belly Bamboos		
	Brunfelsia Americana	Lady of the night	Solanaceae
	Caesalpinia pulcherima	Pecock flower	Fabaceae
	Calliandra brevipes	Pink powder Puff flower	Fabaceae
	Calliandra haematocephala	Red powder puff flower	Fabaceae
	callistemon	Bottle Brush	Myrtaceae
	Cassia Biflora	Cassia Biflora	Leguminosae
	Cassia saimea	Kassod tree	Fabaceae
	Chorisia speciosa	Floss silk tree	Malvaceae
	Dalbergia sisso	Sheesham	Fabaceae
	Delonix regia	Gulmohar	Fabaceae
	Dillenia indica	Chalta/Ramphal	Dilleniaceae
	Elaeocarpus sphaericus	Rudrakhsa	Elaeocarpaceae
	Erythrina indica	Coral/Flame tree	Fabaceae
	Eugenia operculata		Myrtaceae
	Ficus Aleey		
	Ficus Bengalsis	Bargad	
	Ficus Bengalsis varigeta	Bargad Varigated	
	Ficus Benjamina		
	Ficus citation		
	Ficus Goldstar		
	Ficus infectoria	Pakar	Moraceae
	Ficus Lyreta		
	Ficus marginata		
	Ficus Raginold		
	Fish tail palm		Arecaceae
	Franciscea pauciflora	Kal aaj aur kal	Solanaceae
	Grevillia robusta	Silver Oak	Proteaceae
	Jakranda mimosaefolia	Jambul	Bignoniaceae
	Juniperus chinensis		Cupressaceae
	Kajelia pinata	Balam kheera	
	Lagestromia flos regini		Lythraceae
	Magnolia Grandiflora		
	Mimusops elengi	Maulsari	Sapotaceae
	Peltophorum ferrugineum	Pila gulmohar	Fabaceae
	Pines roxburgii		Pinaceae
	Plumeria Alba		Apocynaceae
	Pterospermum acerifolium	Kanak champa	sterculiaceae
	Royale Palm		
	Roystonia Regia	Cuban royal palm	Arecaceae
	Schleichera Trijuga	Cylon oak	Sapindaceae
	Sellphydum		
	Spathodia campanulata	Tulip tree/Ragtura	Bignoniaceae
	Tamarindus indica	Imli	Fabaceae
	Terminalia Arjuna	Arjuna	Combretaceae
	Washingtonia		
	Shrubs		
	Duranta plumeri	Golden dew drop	Verbenaceae
	Ficus Panda		
	Galphimia nitida		Malpighiaceae
	Gardenia Jasminodies		Rubiaceae
	Hamelia Patens		Rubiaceae
	Hibiscus Daffodil	Yellow Gudhal	
	Hibiscus Hybrid	Red Gudhal	
	Ixora Singaporensis		Rubiaceae
	Jacobinia Spps		
	Jasminum Sambac		
	Murraya Exotica		
	Mussaenda Erythrophylla		
	Pachystachs lutea		
	Plumbago Capensis		
	Russelia Juncea		
	Tabernaemontana Coronaria		
	Tecoma Capensis		
	Tecoma Stans		
	Yucca Aloifolia		
	Climbers		
	Bignonia vanusta		Bignoniaceae
	Clerodendron splendens		
	Ficus repens		
	Jiaquemontia violacea		
	Petrea volubilis		
	Quisqualis indica		
	Tecoma grandiflora		
	Wisteria sinensis		
