= Kashinath Yadav =

Indian folk singer and politician

Kashinath Yadav is an Indian folk singer and politician from Ghazipur, Uttar Pradesh, who is famous for singing Biraha, an ethnic Bhojpuri folk genre of Ahir communities.

== Political career ==
He held the position of Minister of State in the Government of Uttar Pradesh in Samajwadi Party's rule. He served as a Member of the Uttar Pradesh Legislative Council three times. With the support of Bahujan Samaj Party's founder Kanshiram, he was made an MLC for the first time. Later, Kashinath left BSP and joined the Samajwadi Party. He was a Member of the UP's Legislative Council twice from Samajwadi Party. He was appointed the National President of Samajwadi Party's Cultural Cell in March 2021.

In September 2016, he was made the chairman of UP's Rajya Krishi Utpadan Mandi Parishad (Uttar Pradesh State Agricultural Produce Market Board) when CM Akhilesh Yadav resigned from the post.

He is said to be close to Mulayam Singh Yadav. Yadav has also served as the advisor to the Uttar Pradesh government. He was awarded Yash Bharti Award, the highest civilian honour of the Government of Uttar Pradesh in 2016 for his outstanding contribution to the music field.
