= IT City, Lucknow =

Technology park in India

Coordinates: 26.793965°N 81.0281181°E

The IT City, Lucknow is part of the mega CG City project envisioned by the government of Uttar Pradesh and is conceptualized as a sustainable technology hub with clean power and balanced environment. It is being built on a PPP model in partnership with HCL Technologies. It is the second major investment by an IT Company in Lucknow, the first being Tata Consultancy Services which has its TCS Awadh Campus present in the city in which thousands of engineers are already working. HCL has begun its operations in the city and training for the first batch of engineers has already been completed. The project will be commissioned by October 2016. Uttar Pradesh government has established Rs 1,500-crore Information Technology (IT) city over 100 acres in Lucknow with the concept of "Walk to Work" on Lucknow-Sultanpur Road. About 100 acres of CG city was allotted to IT and ITeS companies which will also include a hi-tech skill development centre which can train more than 5000 people. The remaining 400 acres is intended for Indian Institute of Information Technology, Lucknow (IIIT) and Medanta-Avadh super speciality hospital. The CG City project also has several other projects which include an international cricket stadium, a world standard cancer research institute, Dr. Trehan owned Medanta Awadh Heart Institute, Amul Milk Plant, 5-star hotels, shopping malls among others. CG City will also have connectivity by Lucknow Metro first phase of which has been operational from 5 September 2017.

== Development ==
The Uttar Pradesh government has awarded the IT SEZ (Special Economic Zone) project located at Sultanpur road, Lucknow to Vama Sundari Investment (Delhi) Pvt Ltd. Vama Sundari is the business investment arm of the popular software firm (HCL Technologies). Investment in the project is around ₹15 billion (US$160 million) out of which ₹5 billion (US$52 million) will be used during first five years. The IT city is designed in such a way that the city will be self-sufficient with electronics, provisioned connectivity through fibre optic power, telephone exchange with extremely advanced facilities, a dedicated earth station and a satellite link. The residential and commercial buildings are also included within the campus. Everyday facilities like schools, hospitals, commercial area and a technologically advanced skill development centres with a capacity to train around 5,000 individuals is also a part of the project.

== Employment ==
When fully completed, the PPP (Public Private Partnership) project will provide immediate jobs to about 25,000 people with secondary employment to about 50,000. In the first phase about 1,000 people are being provided with training and employment which started from 13 April 2016.

== Timelines ==
- April 2012 - SEZ project proposed by the Uttar Pradesh government
- October 2012 - Land for the project was handed over free of cost to the State IT & Electronic Department
- October 2012 - State cabinet approved the project
- March 2013 - Board of Approvals (BoA) for Special Economic Zone (SEZ) equipped a formal approval
- August 2013 - Animal Husbandry Department Bids to develop the IT park were invited
- April 2016 - Training of 1000 students started by HCL
- September 2016 - IT City at CG City to be operational
