= Fun Republic Mall (Lucknow) =

Shopping mall in Lucknow

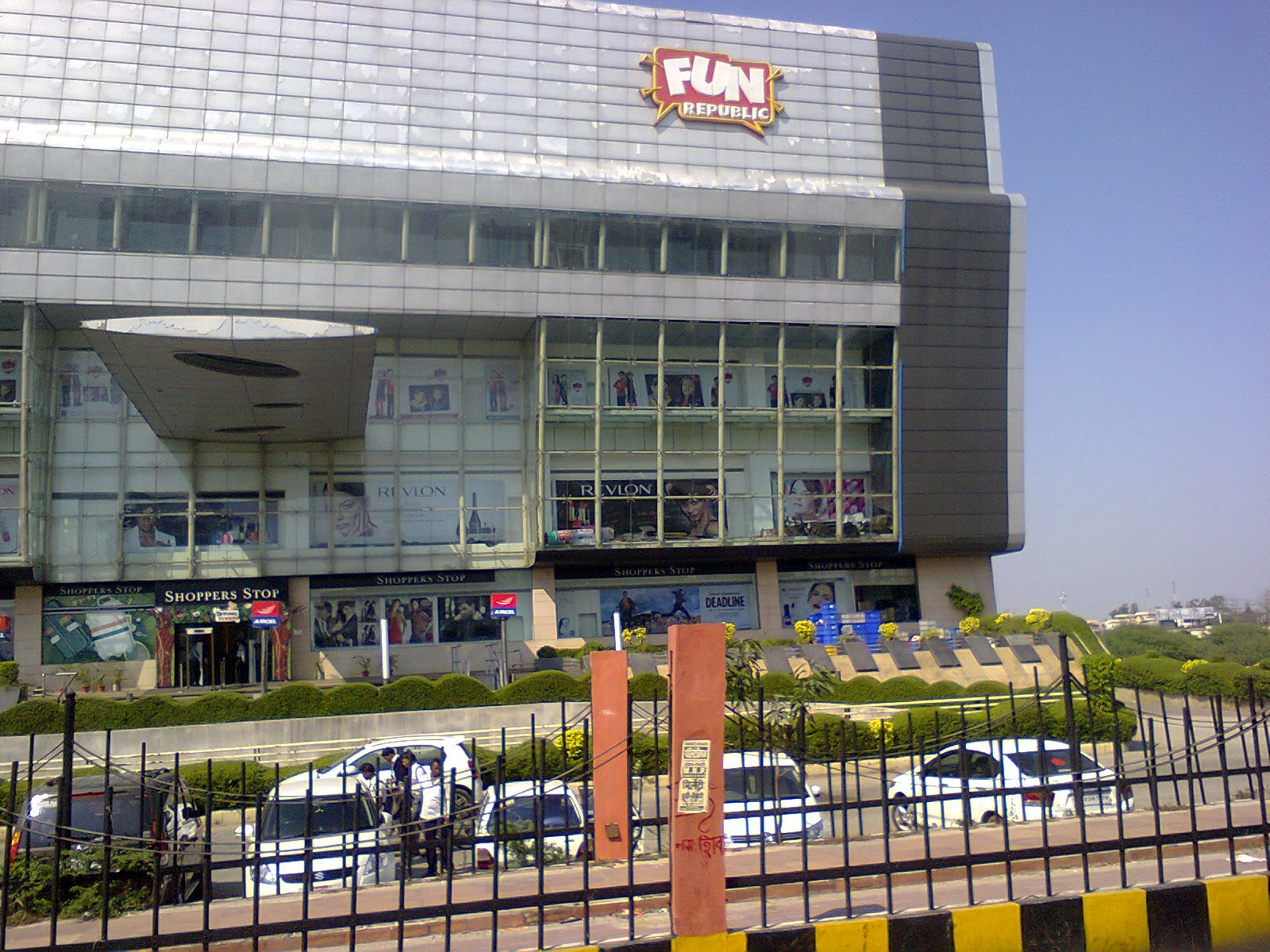
- Fun Republic Mall, Lucknow, India
- Location: Vipin Khand, Gomti Nagar, Lucknow, India
- Coordinates: 26.8575°N 80.9762°E
- Opened: 2007; 19 years ago
- Owner: E-City Real Estates Pvt. Ltd.
- Architect: Zee Group
- Floor area: 970,000 sq ft (90,000 m^{2})
- Floors: 4
- Website: Funrepublic.in

The Fun Republic Mall is a shopping mall located at Vipin Khand in Gomti Nagar, Lucknow. The mall has a Built-up area of more than 970,000 sq ft, including 5,80,000 sq ft of gross leasable (retail) area. It was inaugurated in 2007. It was built by Zee Group in the mid-2000s at a cost of Rs 800 million. It comprises retail outlets, cinema, food court and 60-room boutique hotel. The gaming zone that previously existed is now discontinued. It has parking for 550 cars and average footfall of 25,000-28,000 on weekdays and 37,000-40,000 on weekends.

== Owner ==
Fun Republic Mall is owned by E-City Real Estates Pvt. Ltd. a wing of E-City Ventures.

== See also ==
- List of shopping malls in Northern India
