= Gomti Nagar =

- Greater Lucknow
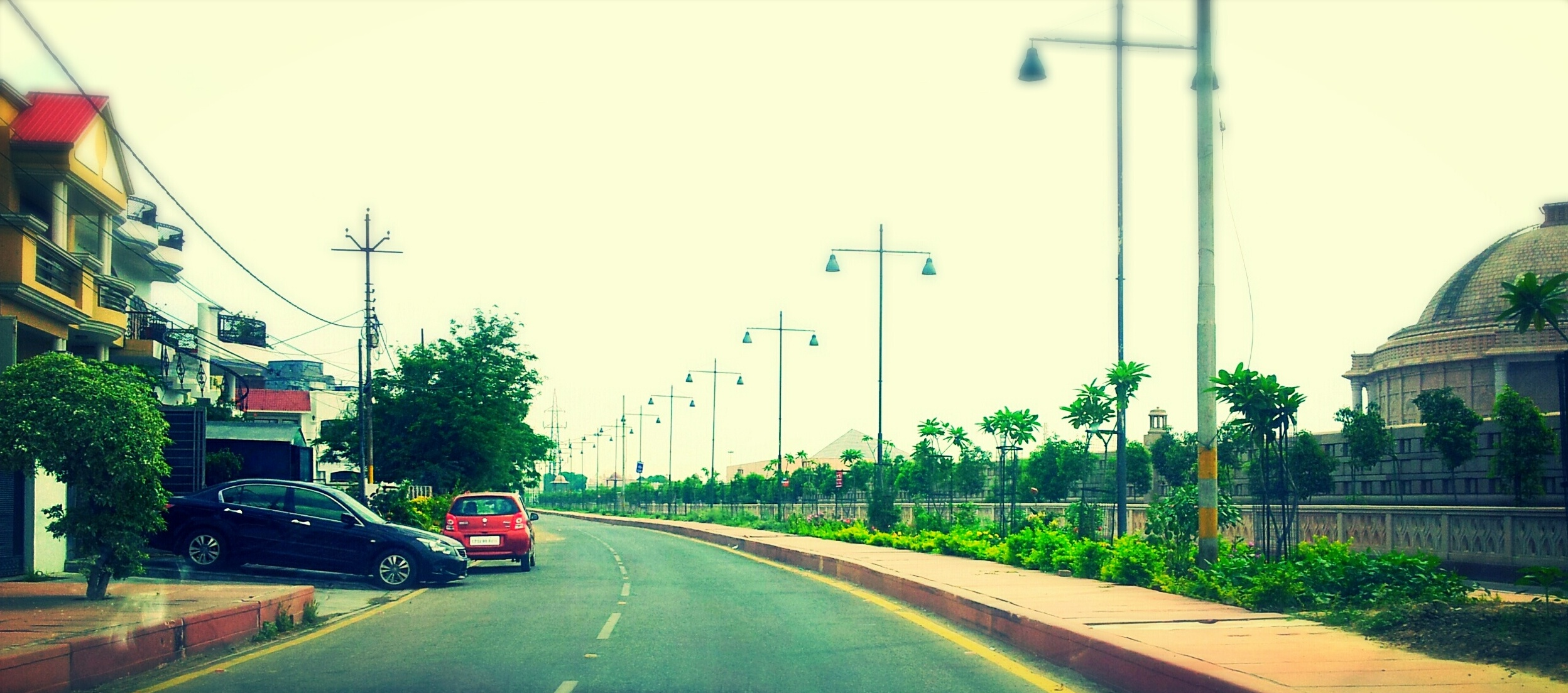
- An upscale residential area in Gomti Nagar

- Location in Uttar Pradesh, India
- Coordinates: 26.8449°N 81.0095°E
- Country: India
- State: Uttar Pradesh
- District: Lucknow
- Elevation: 123 m (404 ft)

Population (2017)
  - Total: 600,000

Languages
  - Official: Hindi, Urdu
- Time zone: UTC+5:30 (IST)
- Postal code: 226 100

Gomti Nagar is an area in the Indian city of Lucknow consisting of both residential and business settlements. It is one of the largest and fastest-growing areas of Lucknow. It is home to high-end residential projects, malls, commercial property, plots, business centers, multiplexes, cafés, hotels, hospitals, clubs, banks, food courts and entertainment centers. The colonies in Gomti Nagar are based on a 'maximum open space' concept hence most of the plots/houses and apartments are park-facing.

== Name ==
Gomti Nagar is situated on the banks of Gomti, a tributary of Ganga which flows through Lucknow.

== Economy ==
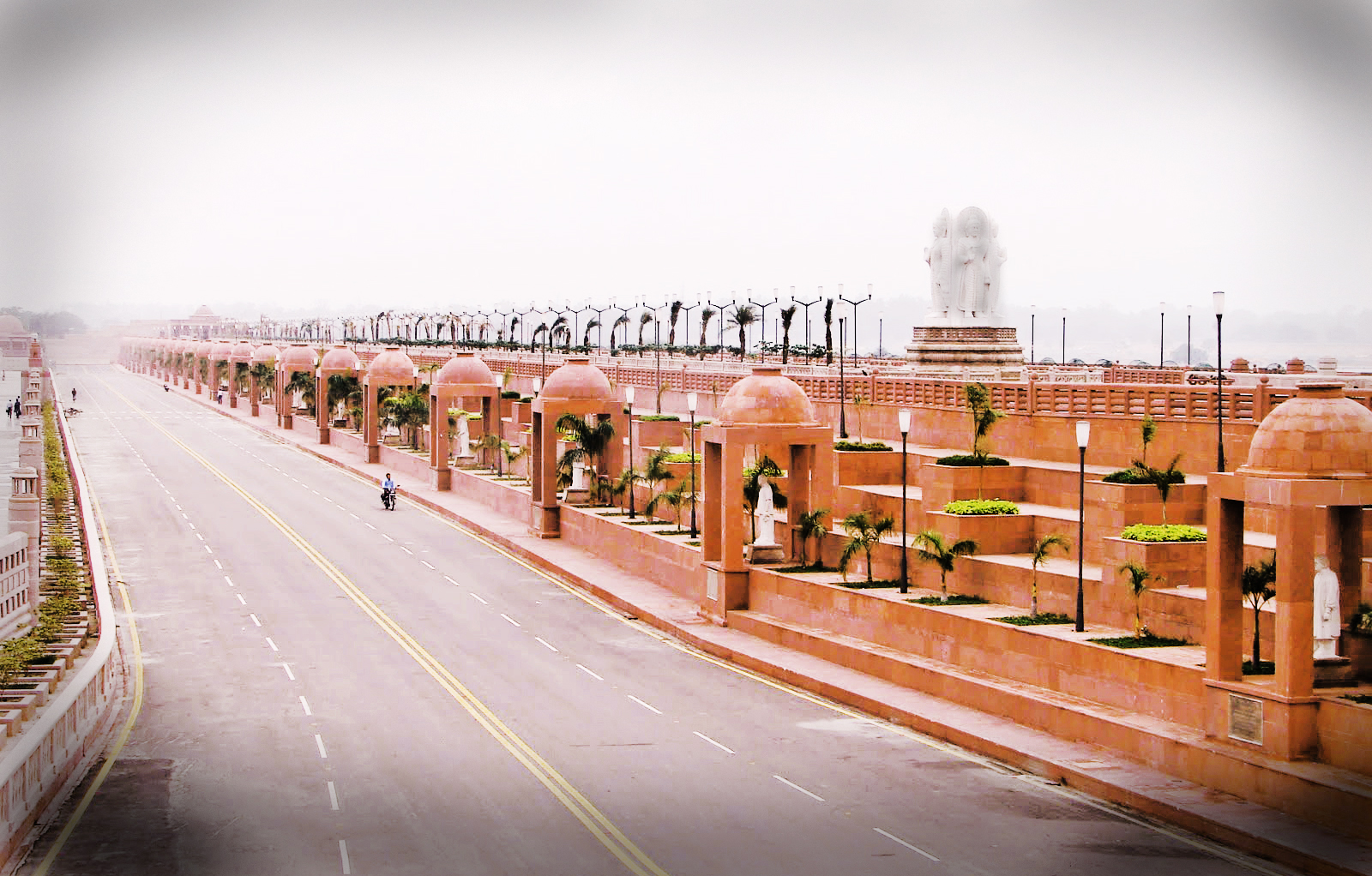
Lane near Marine Drive and Ambedkar Memorial Park

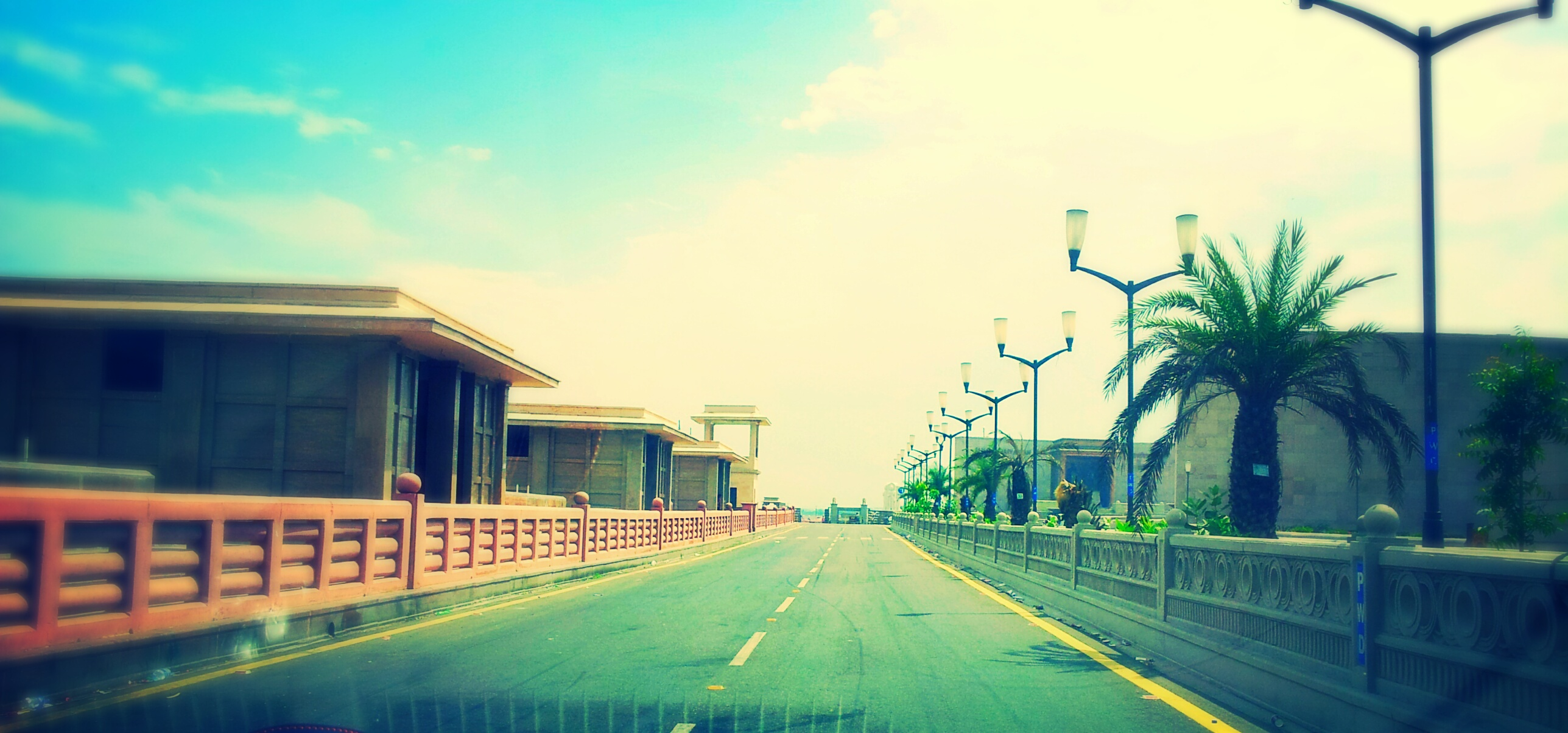
Marine Drive

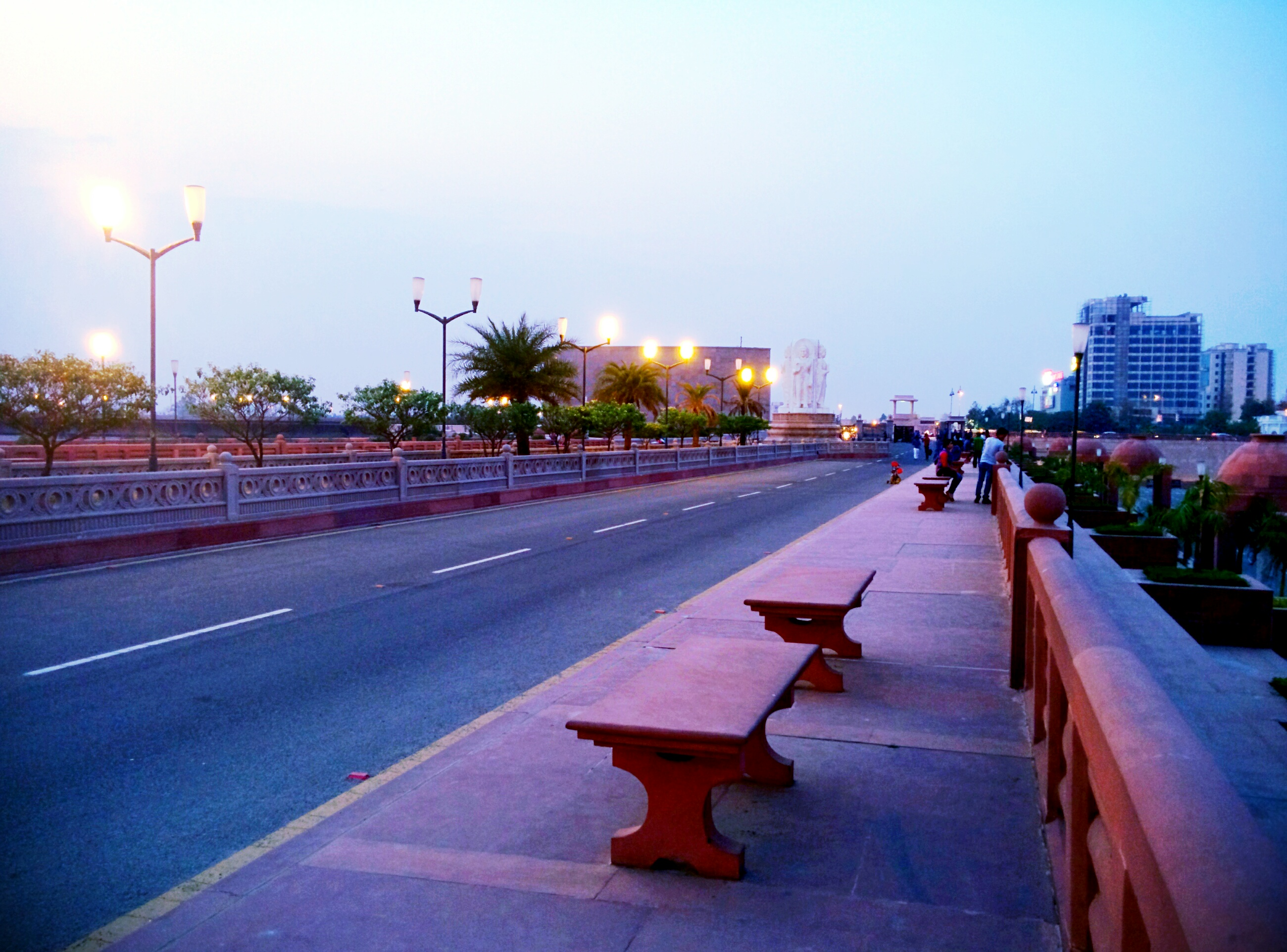
Marine Drive

Gomti Nagar is now developing both as a commercial and IT hub of mainland Lucknow. Till now the Central Lucknow consisting of Hazratganj, Vidhan Sabha Marg & Ashok Marg was the main commercial area.

Many important Government offices like the Reserve Bank of India (RBI), Employees' Provident Fund Organization, Lucknow Metro, PICUP, Office of the CRPF, Custom Division, Institute of Cost and Works Accountants of India, Institute of Chartered Accountants of India, Bharat Sanchar Nigam Limited (BSNL), etc. are situated in Gomti Nagar.

It boasts of National and State level headquarters of SONY, Reliance Retail, UltraTech Cement, etc. It also has a developed industrial area with several factories and industrial units.

The Sahara City of the Sahara India Pariwar, including the residence of Mr. Subrata Roy, is also located in Gomti Nagar.

Gomti Nagar is divided into

- Gomti Nagar - Phase-I (Having sectors with the names of Vibhuti Khand [Commercial District Hub], Vishwas Khand, Vivek Khand, Vikas Khand, Vijay Khand, Vishal Khand, Vipin Khand, Vipul Khand, Vinay Khand, Viram Khand)
- Gomti Nagar - Phase - II (Having sectors with the names of Vikrant Khand, Vishesh Khand, Vijayant Khand, Vibhav Khand, Virat Khand, Vineet Khand, Viraj Khand, Vinamra Khand, Vastu Khand, Vikalp Khand)
- Gomti Nagar Extension. (Having sectors with the names of Sector-1, Sector-2, Sector-3, Sector-4, Sector-5, Sector-6, Sector-7)

Whereas Phase-I & II have occupancy rates of 100%, Gomti Nagar Extension is still under development with more broader roads and modern infrastructure.

Gomti Nagar is divided into various sectors known as "Khands" and the names of all "Khands" start with the letter "V".

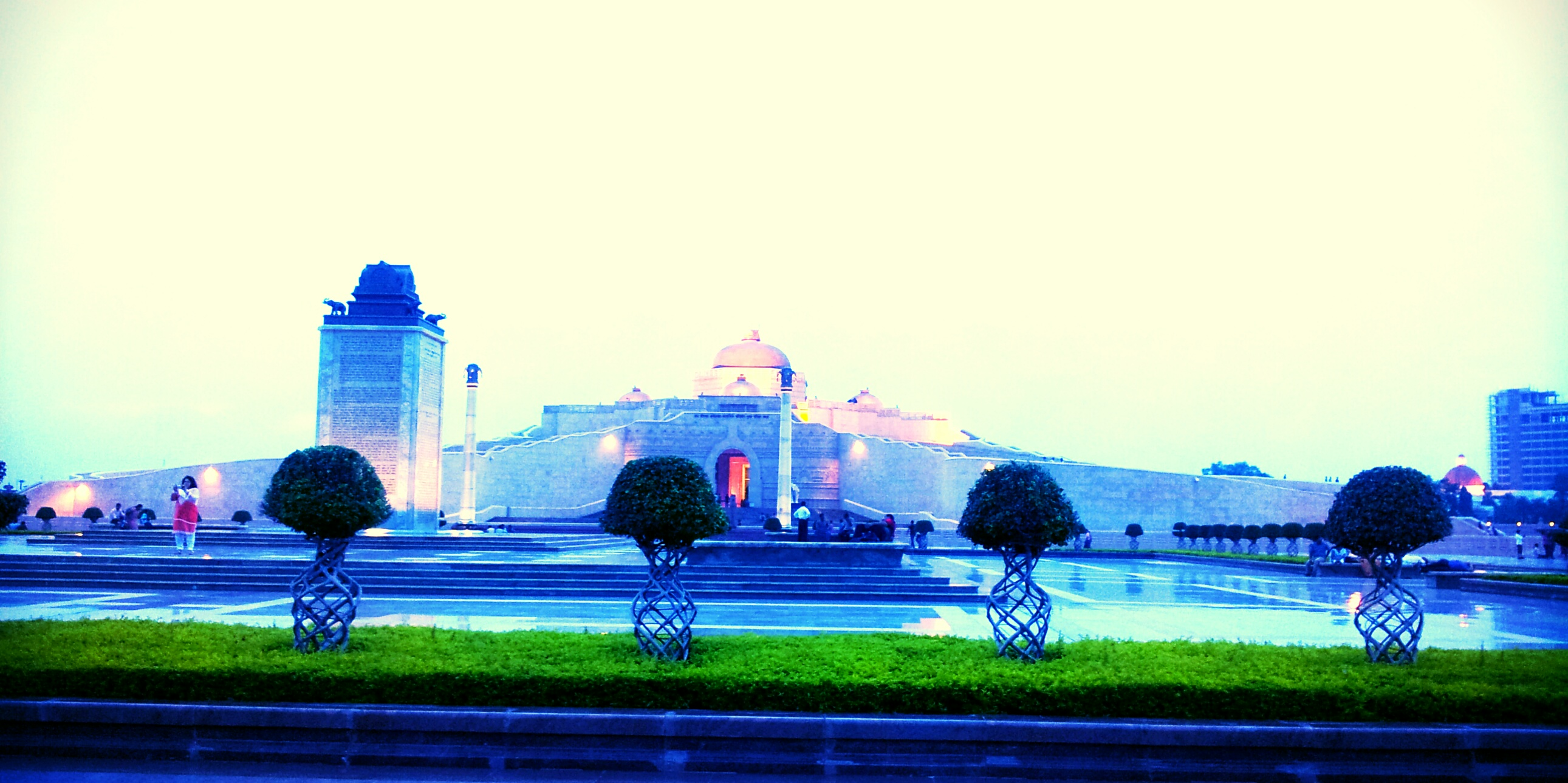
Bhimrao Ambedkar Park

Lucknow's prime business establishments and offices are situated in Gomti Nagar.

== Leisure ==
Eight shopping malls/ multiplexes namely Wave Mall, Fun Republic Mall, City Mall, Singapore Mall, One Awadh Center and Riverside Mall are situated in Gomti Nagar and Phoenix Palassio; second biggest mall of Lucknow in Gomtinagar Extension. The Lulu Mall is on Shaheed Path which is claimed as the biggest mall in India by its owner. The mall is spread over an area of 22 lakh sq.ft. area. Lulu Group invested 2000 Cr. for this.

It is home to a number of restaurants, pubs, cafes and eating joints. Patrakarpuram is the busiest market in Gomti Nagar. It is a major shopping and recreational hub with houses, restaurants, cafes, shops and food-joints.

Gomti Nagar has three big parks - Ambedkar Park, Janeshwar Mishra Park and Ram Manohar Lohia Park. Janeshwar Mishra Park is the biggest park of Asia sprawling 376 acres of land. It is home to a huge variety of plants and trees. It has the longest jogging and bicycle track in India. It has huge man-made water bodies with fountains. It also houses a real MIG-21 aircraft and 2 battle tanks for public display. A 200 ft. high flag of India is another highlight of this park. The park is eco-friendly owing to its rain-water harvesting and solar electricity setups. The Ambedkar park is a mammoth construction of marble, stones and fountains. It looks marvelous when lit up at night. Lohia Park is popular among morning walkers and fitness addicts as it houses a professional jogging/racing track and an open-air gym.

Marine Drive/River Drive (unofficial name) located on the banks of river Gomti is a crowd-puller during evenings. The musical fountain show organised every evening in a nearby park attracts people from all over the city. The Riverfront mega project is an 8 km long project which includes walkways, cycle-tracks, benches, greenery, lighting and beautification of the river banks on both sides. The Gomti Riverfront Project has already been major attraction for tourists and film makers in the city.

Gomti Nagar is home to a number of 5-Star and 4-Star hotels like Vivanta by Taj, Renaissance by Marriot, Novotel, Grand JBR, Ranjee's, Hyatt Regency, Fairfield by Marriot, Comfort Inn, Dayal Paradise, and Hotel Lineage.

== Transport ==
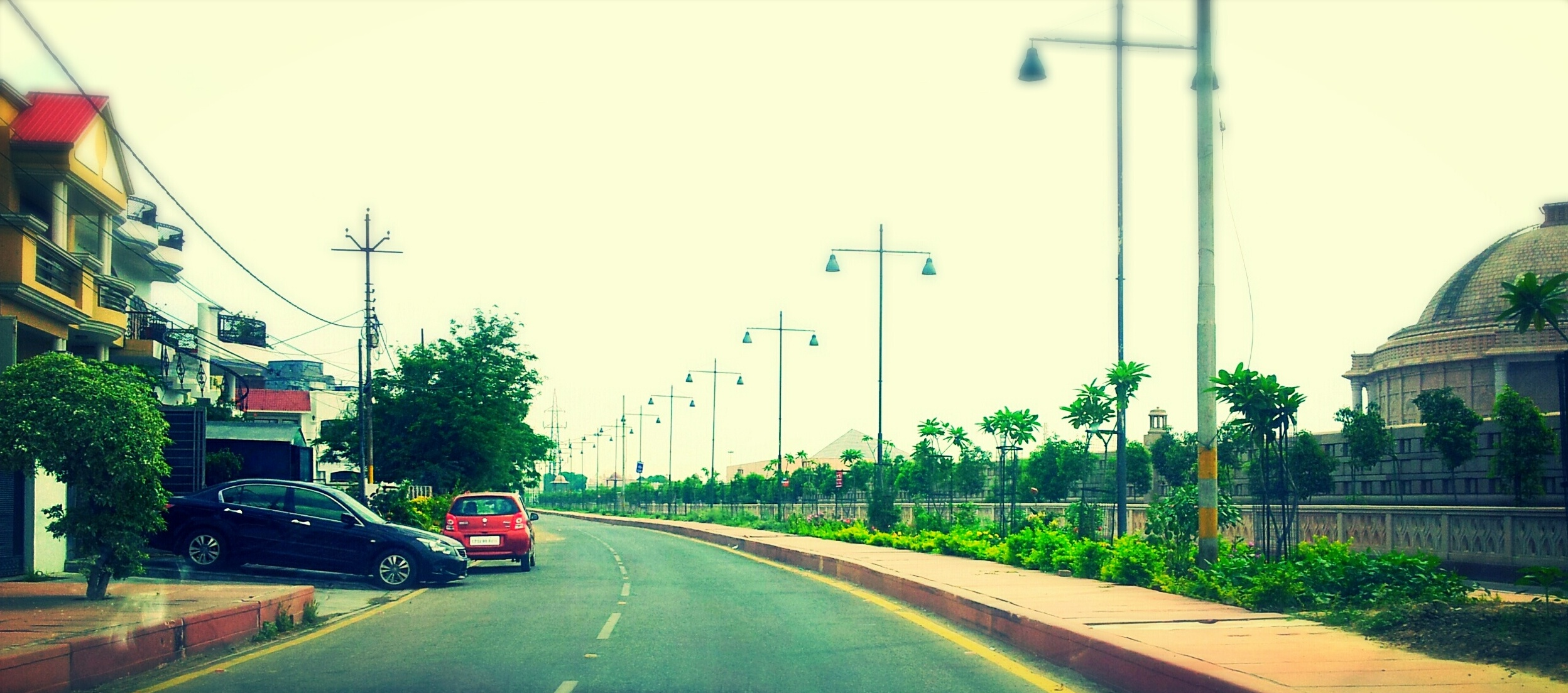
An upscale residential area in Gomti Nagar

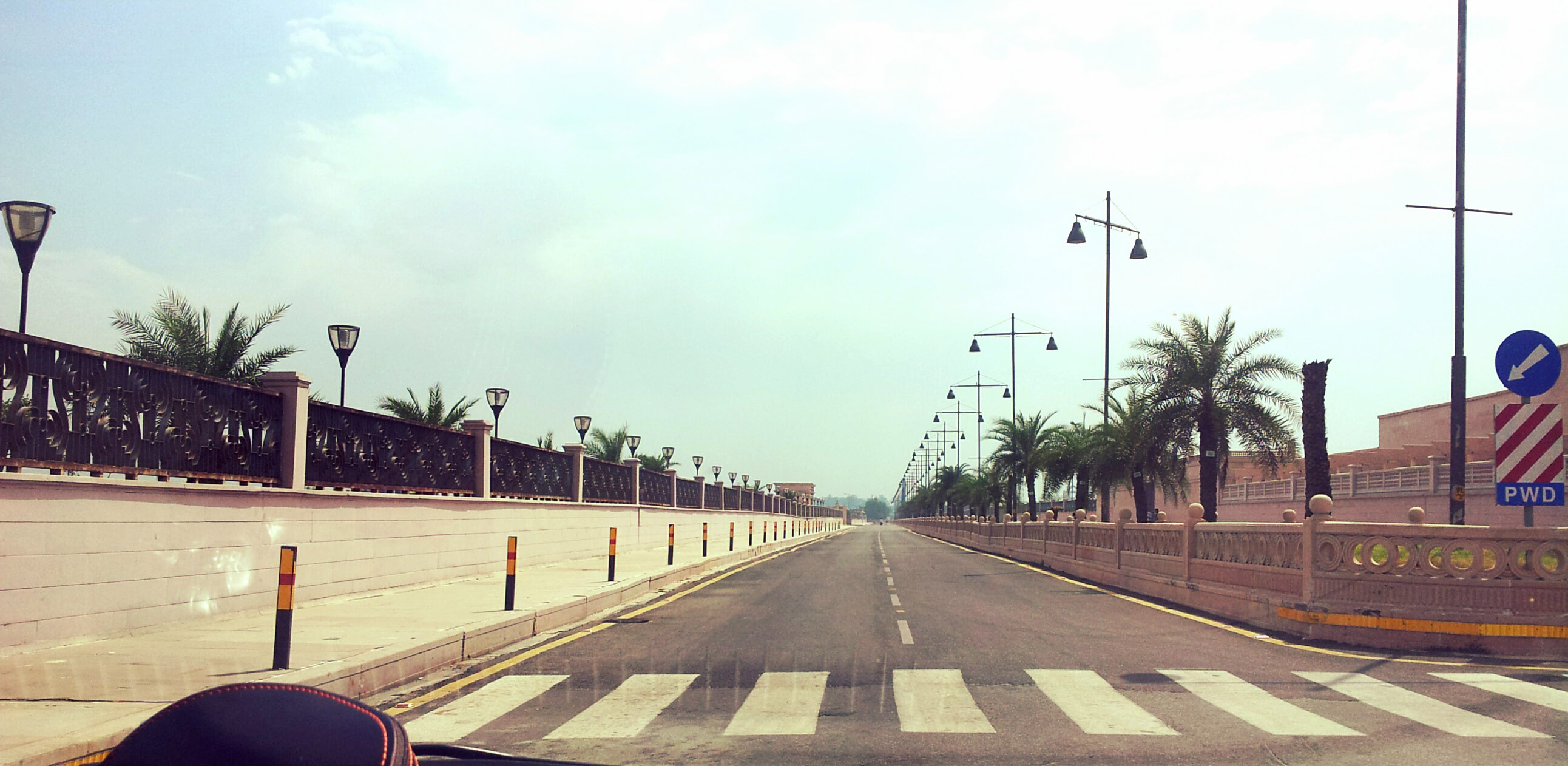
Roads near Marine Drive, Gomti Nagar

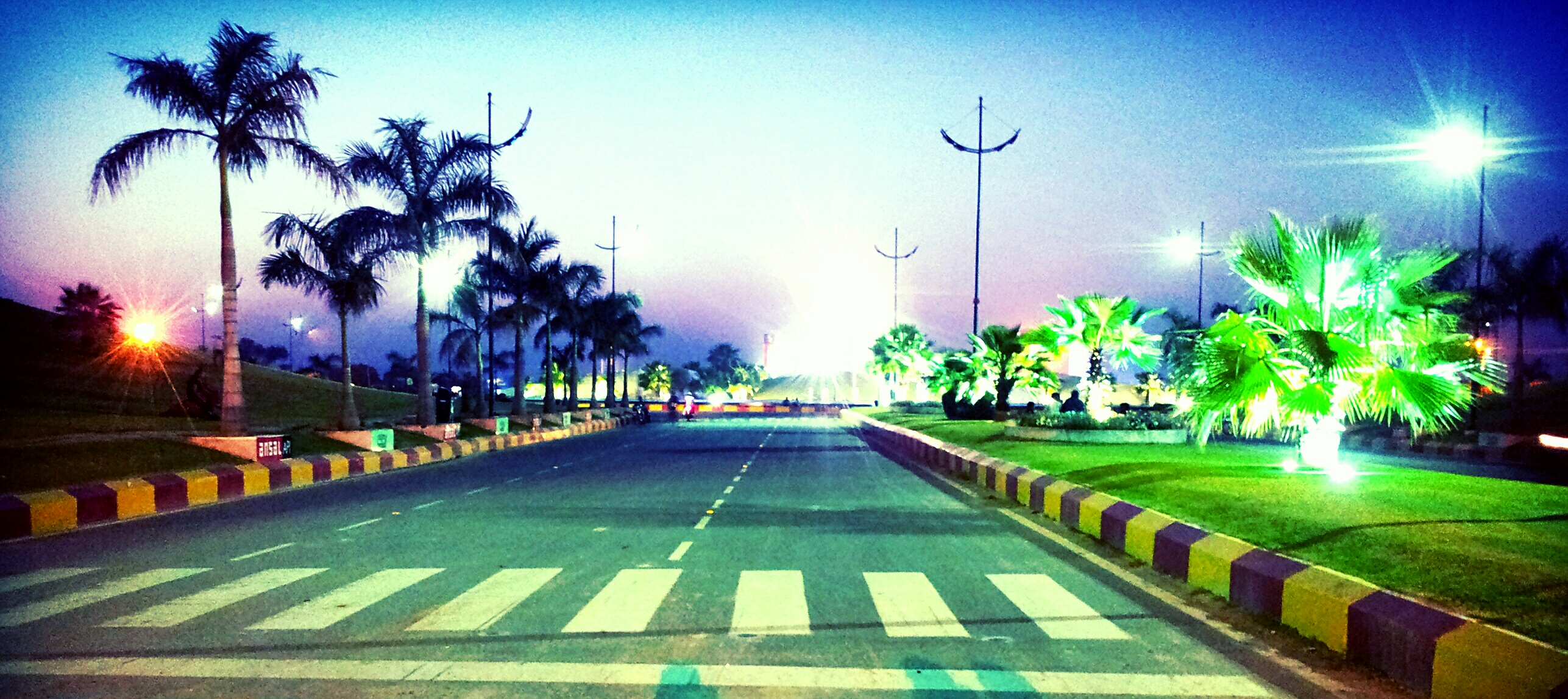
Sushant Golf City, Shaheed Path, Gomti Nagar Extension

=== Railways ===
Gomti Nagar railway station is a railway station which is situated on Barabanki-Lucknow Suburban Railway railway line. Many stations are covered by Lucknow-Kanpur Suburban Railway. It serves daily commuters. Some of the trains are operated from Barabanki city. An expansion of the Gomti Nagar railway station began in 2018, and is expected to be finished by the end of 2020.

Another railway station - Malhaur now falls within Gomti Nagar. The transportation is mainly road based. It is connected with the city through city bus, autorickshaw etc.

=== Metro ===
For the Gomti Nagar Metro link, the train coming from the airport terminal was to be diverted towards Gomti Nagar at the Indira Nagar trisection Polytechnic crossing along an elevated route. The planned stations were Indira Nagar Trisection, West End Mall [Wave Multiplex], Gomti Nagar and Patrakarpuram.

=== Air ===
Chaudhary Charan Singh International Airport, Amausi is the nearest airport and is directly connected by air with international destinations include Dubai, Muscat, Sharjah, Dammam, Jeddah, Abu Dhabi, Bangkok, Kuala Lumpur, Riyadh, Ras Al Khaimah

== Education ==
Gomti Nagar has some of the city's professional institutes, colleges, schools, coaching and test preparation institutes.

=== Professional institutes ===
- Institute of Cost Accountants of India
- Institute of Company Secretaries of India
- Institute of Chartered Accountants of India

=== Colleges ===
- College of Innovative Management And Science (CIMS) Vipul Khand Gomti Nagar.
- BBD Group of Colleges and University
- Amity University, Lucknow
- Institute of Management Research and Technology
- Jaipuria Institute of Management
- IMRT Business School
- National School of Management & Governance
- Dr. Ram Manohar Lohia Institute of Medical Sciences
- Bhartendu Natya Academy(BNA)
- ICFAI
- IILM Academy of Higher Learning

=== Schools ===
- Scholars' Home
- St. Francis School
- City Montessori School
- Seth M.R.Jaipuria School, Lucknow
- Kendriya Vidyalaya
- Lucknow Public School
- Study Hall School
- Bharatiya Vidya Bhavan
- Red Rose Sr. Secondary School
- Modern Academy
- Riverside Academy
- St John Bosco College
- Delhi Public School
- Amity International School, Lucknow
- Modern School
- St. Don Bosco College
- St. Mary's College
- Jagran Public School
- Almighty Montessori Inter College
- SKD Academy (Vikrant Khand Branch)
- Rani Laxmibai College
- St. Columbus Inter College
- Police Modern School
- St. Peter's School
- St. Xavier's Convent School
- Maharaja Agrasen Public School
- T D Girls Inter College
- Mahamana malviya Vidya mandir
- VIBGYOR High School

== Sports ==
Cricket, football, badminton, golf, and hockey are among the most popular sports in the area. It is home to Babu Banarasi Das Badminton Academy, which is situated near Lohia Park. The construction of Ekana Sports Stadium, which also consists of Bharat Ratna Shri Atal Bihari Vajpayee Ekana International Cricket stadium, has been completed. In November 2018, an international T20 match was played between Indian and West Indies in which India emerged victorious..
