= Lucknow Mahotsav =

Art and culture Festival In India

- Genre: Art & Culture
- Dates: 10 Days Of The Year
- Locations: Lucknow, Uttar Pradesh, India
- Years active: 1976–present
- Website: lucknowmahotsav.in

Lucknow Mahotsav, is an Indian art and culture program organized every year in Lucknow, India to showcase Uttar Pradesh's art and culture and in particular Lucknowavi "Tehzeeb", and to promote tourism.

One of the objectives of the festival is to provide encouragement to the artisans. Craftsmen from all over the country bring their masterpieces to the festival. Colorful processions, traditional dramas, Kathak dances in the style of Lucknow Gharana, sarangi and sitar recitals, ghazals, qawalis and thumri. Exciting events like ekka races, kite flying, cockfighting, and other customary village games.

== History ==
The year 1975-76 was observed and organized by Southern Asians as The Tourism Year. On this occasion it became a motive to promote Lucknow Mahotsav's Art, Culture, and Tourism for national and international tourists. The decision to organize the Lucknow Festival was taken. During this period, with the exception of a few years, Lucknow Mahotsav has been celebrated every year. During the festival, an array of displays and events from Tonga races to Vintage automobiles reminds one of the past glories. It was held in Begum Hazratmahal Park for most of time.

== Entertainment ==
The 10 days long festival is one such example. The festival invites many musical as well as comical artists for completing your day in its full sense. During these ten days, the entire arena is filled with people enjoying various rides and other poetry and cultural events. In 2014 the event took place between 25 November and 7 December.
