= Arts and entertainment in India =

Arts and architecture in India have been shaped by a synthesis of indigenous and foreign influences that have consequently shaped the course of the arts of the rest of Asia, since ancient times. Arts refer to paintings, architecture, literature, music, dance, languages and cinema. In early India, most of the arts were derived Vedic influences. After the birth of contemporary Hinduism, Jainism, Buddhism, and Sikhism arts flourished under the patronage of kings and emperors. The coming of Islam spawned a whole new era of Indian architecture and art. Finally the British brought their own Gothic and Roman influences and fused it with the Indian style. They have a culture infusion in their art.

== Architecture ==
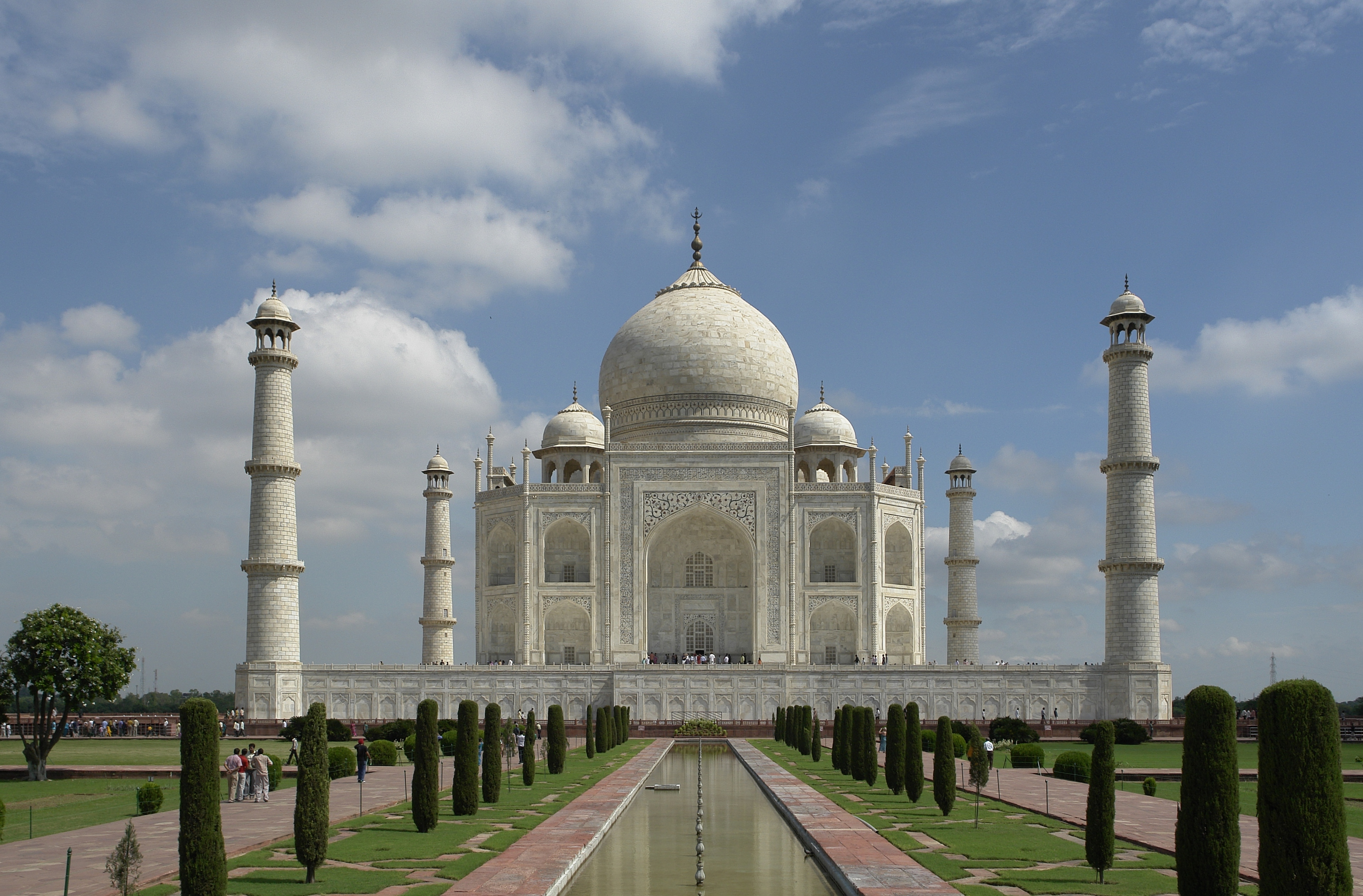
The Taj Mahal in Agra is widely considered to be the best example of Indo-Islamic architecture and is one of the most well-known monuments in the world.

The earliest production in the Indus Valley Civilization was characterised by cities and houses where religion did not seem to play an active role. The Buddhist period is primarily represented by three important building types- the Chaitya Hall (place of worship), the Vihara (monastery) and the Stupa (hemispherical mound for worship/ memory) - exemplified by the caves of Ajanta and Ellora and the monumental Sanchi Stupa. The Jaina temples are characterised by high levels of detail that can be seen in the Dilwara Temples in Mount Abu. Early beginnings of Hindu temple architecture have been traced to the remains at Aihole and Pattadakal in present-day Karnataka, and have Vedic altars and late Vedic temples as described by Pāṇini as models. Later, as more differentiation took place, the Dravidian/ Southern style and or the Indo-Aryan/ Northern/ Nagara style of temple architecture emerged as dominant modes, epitomized in productions such as the Brihadeeswara Temple, Thanjavur, and the Sun Temple, Konark.

With the arrival of Islam, a new style of architecture known as Indo-Islamic architecture emerged combining traditional Indian and Islamic elements. The earliest examples include the Qutb complex, a series of monuments built by successive sultans of the Delhi Sultanate. The architecture of the Mughal Empire includes the Red Fort, Taj Mahal, Agra Fort, Humayun's tomb, Jama Masjid and Fatehpur Sikri.

With colonization, a new chapter began. Though the Dutch, Portuguese and the French were influencers, it was the English who had a lasting impact. The architecture of the colonial period varied from the beginning attempts at creating authority through classical prototypes to the later approach of producing a supposedly more responsive image through what is now termed Indo-Saracenic architecture- a mixture of Hindu, Islamic and Western elements.

With the introduction of Modern Architecture into India and later with Independence, the quest was more towards progress as a paradigm fuelled by Nehruvian visions. The planning of Chandigarh- a city most architects hate/love- by Le Corbusier was considered a step towards this. Later as modernism became less popular in the West and new directions were sought for, there was a movement in India toward architecture rooted in the Indian context. This direction called Critical Regionalism is exemplified in the works of architects such as B. V. Doshi, Charles Correa, etc. Apart from this, the advent of globalisation and economic development since the 90s, has spawned a collection of modern IT campuses and skyscrapers, and as economic reform accelerates, metropolitan areas are gaining futuristic skylines.

Various examples of Indian architecture

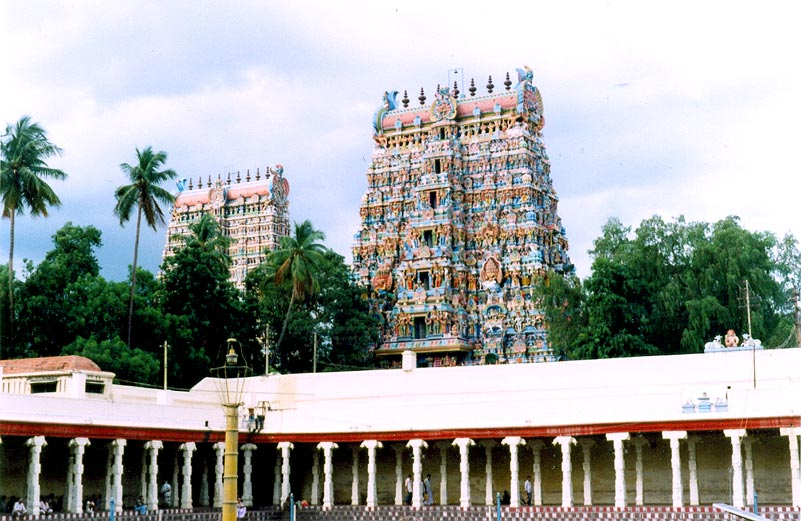
Typical South Indian temple gopuram (temple gate) built almost a millennium ago, but as tall as a modern mid-rise.

Victoria Memorial, a specimen of British Indian architecture, which incorporated European gothic, Persian saracenic and traditional Indian architecture.

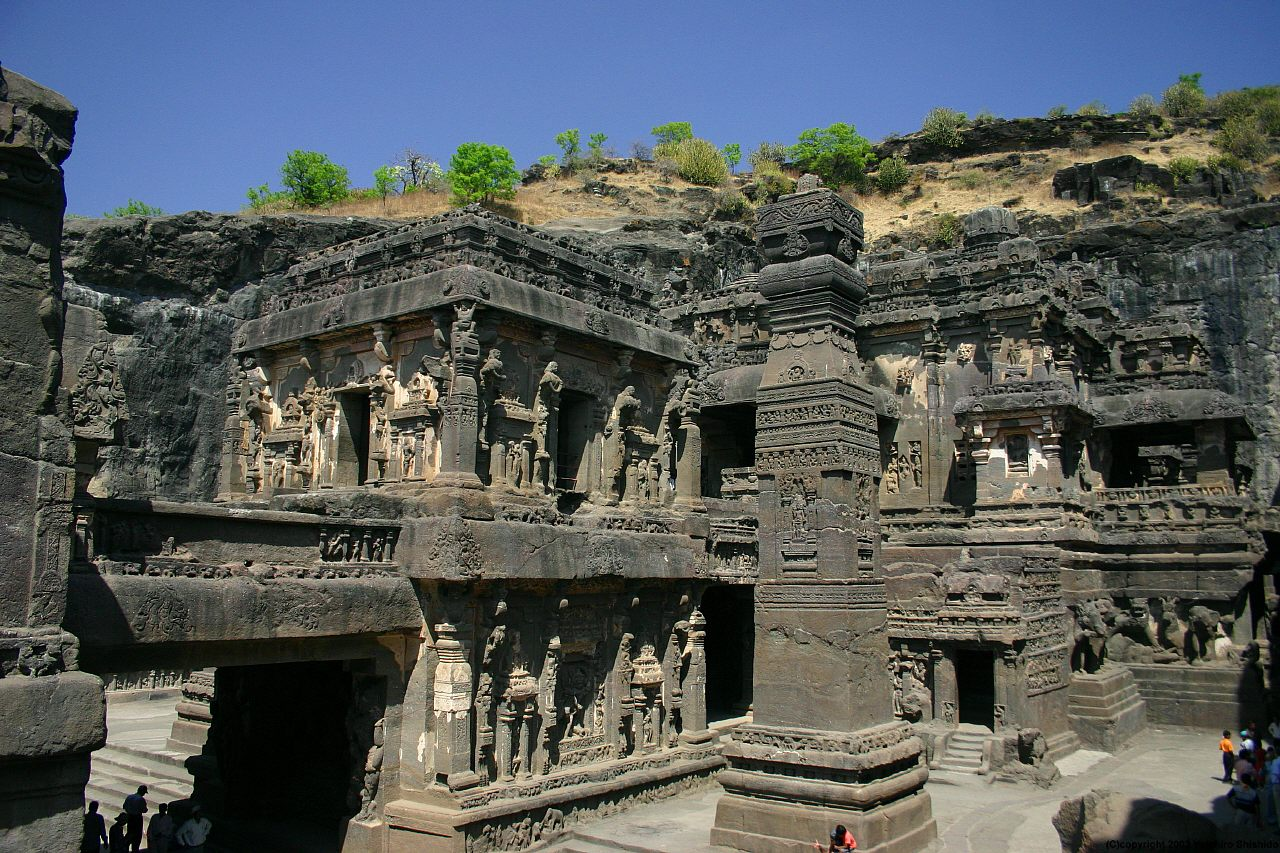
The massive Ellora Hindu and Buddhist temples were not constructed, but in fact carved out of solid rock from the top to the bottom.

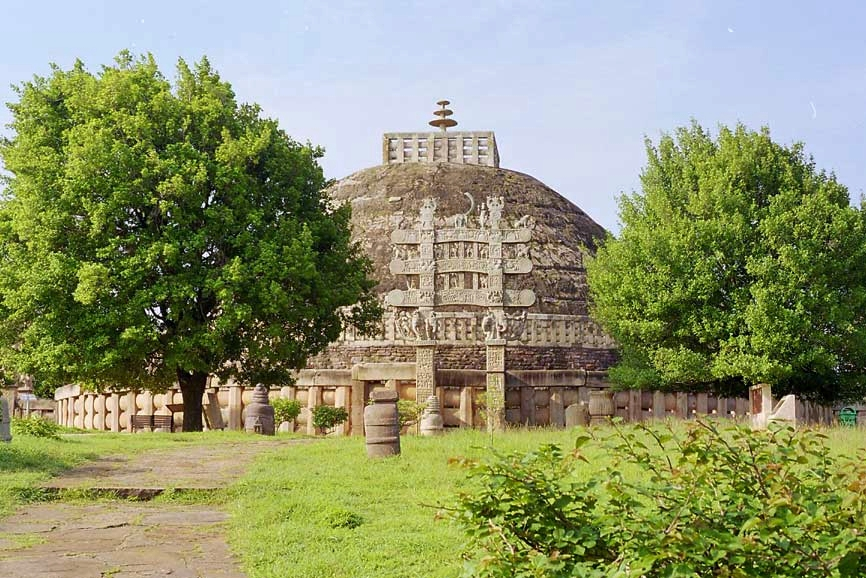
The Great Buddhist Stupa at Sanchi is the oldest existing structure in India, aside from the Indus Valley Civilization ruins, and a World Heritage Site.

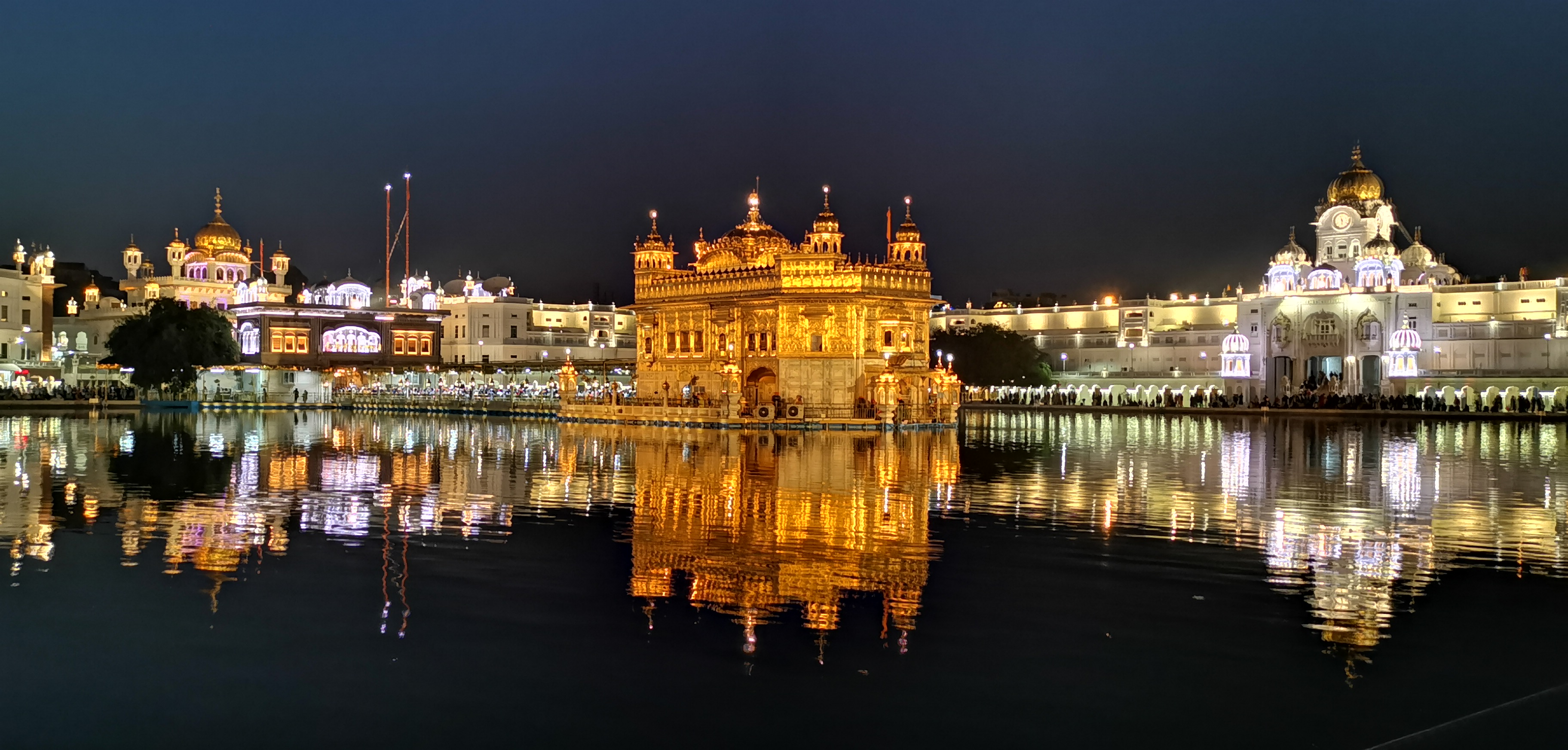
The Harimandir Sahib, known popularly as the Golden Temple, is a sacred shrine for Sikhs.

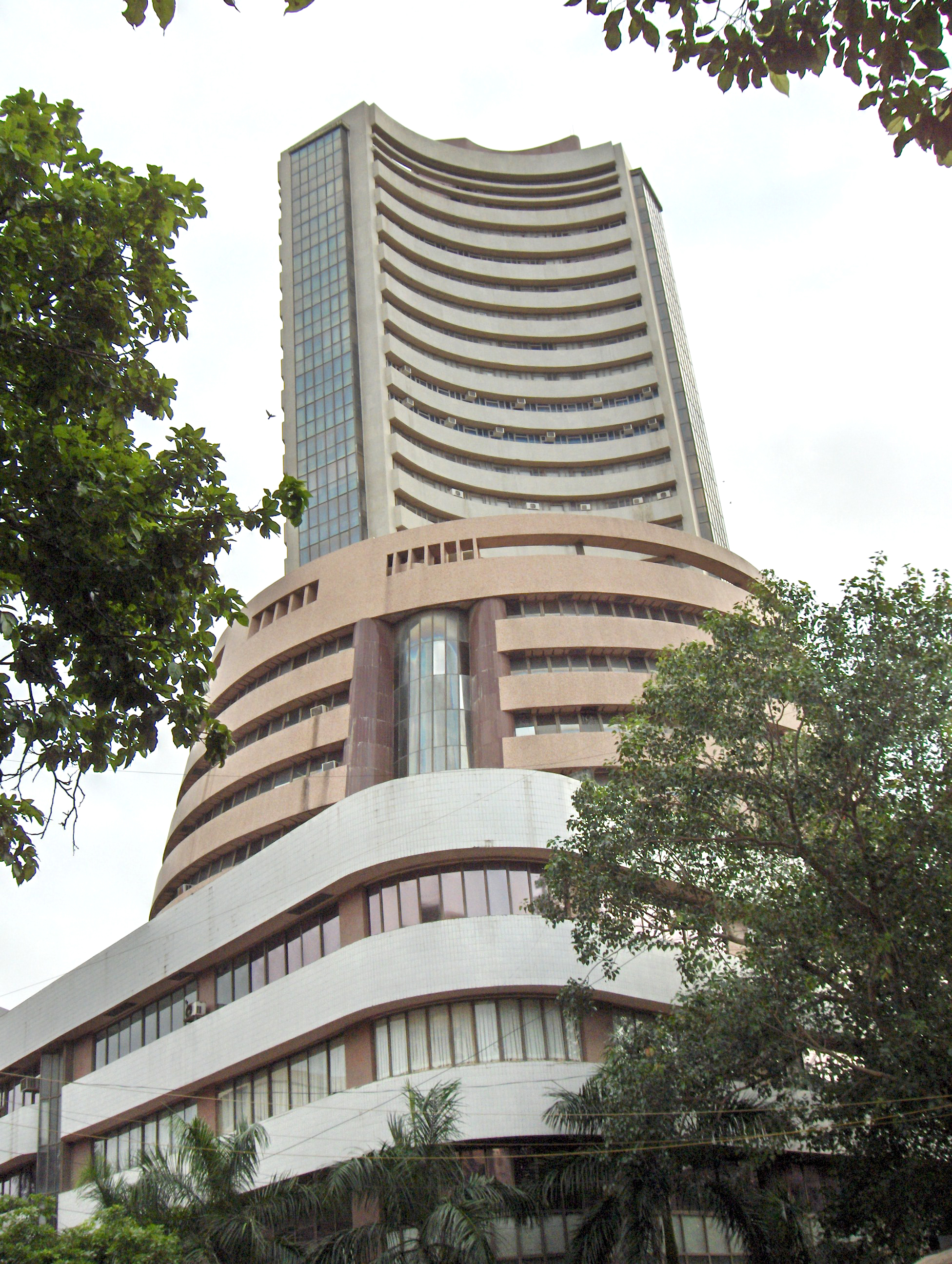
Phiroze Jeejeebhoy Towers, location of the Bombay Stock Exchange is an example of 1980s Indian architecture.

== Literature ==
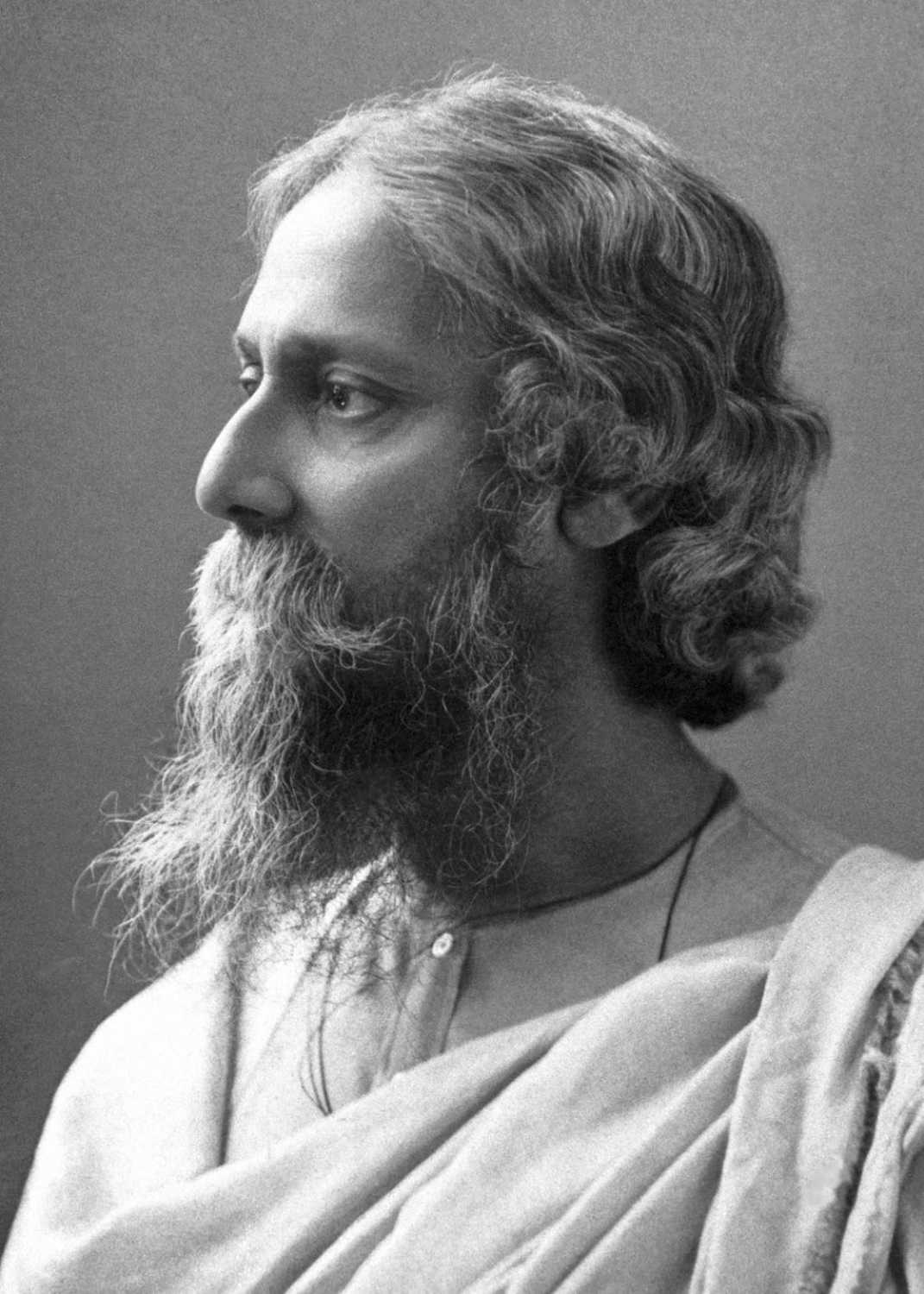
Rabindranath Tagore won the Nobel Prize for literature. It is the first Nobel Prize won by Asia.

Indian literature is generally acknowledged, but not wholly established, as the oldest in the world. India has 22 officially recognized languages, and a huge variety of literature has been produced in these languages over the years. In Indian literature, oral and written forms are both important. Hindu literary traditions dominate a large part of Indian culture. Apart from the Vedas which are a sacred form of knowledge, there are other works such as the Hindu epics Ramayana and Mahabharata, treatises such as Vaastu Shastra in architecture and town planning, and Arthashastra in political science. Devotional Hindu drama, poetry and songs span the subcontinent. Among the best known are the works of Kalidasa (writer of the famed Sanskrit play Shakuntala) and Tulsidas (who wrote an epic Hindi poem based on the Ramayana, called Raamcharitmaanas).

Tamil literature has been in existence for more than 2500 years. Tolkaappiyam has been credited as its oldest work, whereas the exact origins of Thirukkural is unknown. The golden age of Tamil literature was during the Sangam period, roughly 1800 years ago. The classic works of this period are Cilappatikaram, Manimekalai, and Sivakasinthamani. Tamil literature is known for its secular traditions, although its authors had strong religious beliefs. Thirukkural is considered to be the greatest of Tamil works. Kannada literature is probably the third oldest in Indian literature next to Sanskrit literature and Tamil literature. The earliest reported work in Kannada literature dates back to the fifth century. The first available literary in Kannada is Kavirajamarga, written in the eighth century by Amoghavarsha Nrpatunga. Hindi literature started as religious and philosophical poetry in medieval periods in dialects like Avadhi and Brij. The most famous figures from this period are Kabir and Tulsidas. In modern times, the Khadi dialect became more prominent and a variety of literature was produced in Sanskrit.

The most renowned Bengali writer is Nobel laureate Rabindranath Tagore, who received the Nobel Prize for Literature. In the last century, several Indian writers have distinguished themselves not only in traditional Indian languages but also in English. India's only native-born Nobel laureate in literature was the Bengali writer Rabindranath Tagore, but VS Naipaul, a diaspora Indian novelist born in Trinidad, also won the Nobel in 2001. Other major writers who are either Indian or of Indian origin and derive much inspiration from Indian themes are R. K. Narayan, Vikram Seth, Salman Rushdie, Arundhati Roy, Raja Rao, Amitav Ghosh, Vikram Chandra, Mukul Kesavan, Shashi Tharoor, Nayantara Sehgal, Anita Desai, Ashok Banker, Shashi Deshpande, Jhumpa Lahiri, and Bharati Mukherjee.

== Music ==
Indian music includes multiple varieties of folk, popular, pop, and classical music. India's classical music tradition, including Carnatic and Hindustani music, has a history spanning millennia and, developed over several eras, remains fundamental to the lives of Indians today as sources of religious inspiration, cultural expression and pure entertainment. India is made up of several dozen ethnic groups, speaking their own languages and dialects. Alongside distinctly subcontinental forms there are major influences from Persian, Arab and British music. Indian genres like filmi and bhangra have become popular throughout the United Kingdom, South and East Asia, and around the world.

Indian stars now sell records in many countries, while world music fans listen to the roots music of India's diverse nations. American soul, rock and hip hop music have also made a large impact, primarily on Indian pop and filmi music. Other highly popular forms are ghazal, qawwali, thumri, dhrupad, dadra, bhajan, kirtan, shabad, and gurbani. Filmi music is often said to have begun in 1931, with the release of Ardeshir M. Irani's Alam Ara and its popular soundtrack. In the earliest years of the Indian cinema, filming was generally Indian (classical and folk) in inspiration, with some Western elements. Over the years, the Western elements have increased, but without completely destroying the Indian flavour. Most of the Indian movies are musicals and feature elaborate song and dance numbers. There is constant work for pop music composers — or music directors, to use the Indian term. Movie soundtracks are released as tapes and CDs, sometimes even before the movie is released.

== Dance ==
Indian classical dance is performed in different styles. Its theory can be traced back to the Natya Shastra of Bharata Muni, a sage from Tamil Nadu (400 BC). The Natya Shastra is the most important ancient treatise on classical Indian dance. It is also called the fifth Veda in reference to the foundation of Hindu religion and philosophy, from which sprang the related South Indian musical tradition of Carnatic music. Its various current forms include Bharatanatyam, Odissi, Manipuri, Kathakali, Kuchipudi, Mohiniaattam, Kathak and Sattriya.

Bharatanatyam is a classical dance form originating in Tamil Nadu. It is thought to have been created by Bharata Muni. In ancient times Bharatanatyam was performed by mandir (Hindu temple) Devadasis. Many of the ancient sculptures in Hindu temples are based on Bharatanatyam dance postures karanas.

Odissi is one of the oldest surviving forms of dance, with depictions of Odissi dancing dating back as far as the 1st century BC. Like other forms of Indian classical dance, the Odissi style traces its origins back to antiquity. Dancers are found depicted in bas-relief in the hills of Udaygiri (near Bhubaneswar) dating back to the 1st century BC. The Natya Shastra speaks of the dance from this region and refers to it as Odra-Magadhi.

Kathakali (katha for story, kali for performance or play) is a form of dance-drama. It originated in the South Indian state of Kerala over 500 years ago. It is a spectacular combination of drama, dance, music and ritual. Characters with vividly painted faces and elaborate costumes re-enact stories from the Hindu epics, Mahabharata and Ramayana.

Kuchipudi is a classical dance form from Andhra Pradesh, Telangana, a state of South India. Kuchipudi is the name of a small village in the Divi Taluq of Krishna district that borders the Bay of Bengal and with resident Brahmins practising this traditional dance form, it acquired the present name. Mohiniaattam is a traditional dance from the South Indian state of Kerala. Mohini is an Apsaras in the Hindu mythology and aattam in Malayalam means dance. So Mohiniaattam essentially means "dance of the enchantress". The theme of Mohiniaattam is love and devotion to god. The costume worn by the dancers are typically white coloured kasavu saree with golden borders.

The Kathak dance form arose from the Vaishnava devotees dancing to the episodes from Krishna's life. Originally a Northern Indian temple dance, it was transformed to a court dance in the Mughal era. The new Muslim influence brought with it certain changes to the dance form: what had been a largely devotional practice now became more a courtly entertainment.

The Sattriya dance is believed to be a creation of the great Vaishnavite (bhakti) guru Srimanta Sankardeva considered the lead architect of Assamese literature and culture. He created this magnificent Sattriya dance to accompany the Ankiya Naat (a form of Assamese one-act play, another creation of Sankardeva) which was usually performed in Satras (Assamese monasteries). Since the dance developed and grew within the Satras, it is named after these religious institutions.

Folk dances are performed for every possible occasion, to celebrate the arrival of seasons, birth of a child, a wedding and festivals. The dances are very focused on gestures, postures, and expressions. The dances burst with verve and vitality. Men and women perform some dances exclusively, while in some performances men and women dance together. On most occasions artists sing the main lyrics and are accompanied by instruments. Each form of dance has a specific costume. Most costumes are flamboyant with extensive jewels.

Bhangra is a form of music and dance that originated in the Punjab region of India. Bhangra dance began as a folk dance conducted by Punjabi farmers to celebrate the coming of Vaisakhi, a sikh festival. The specific moves reflect the manner in which villagers farmed their land. This musical art further became synthesized after the partition of India, when refugees from different parts of the Punjab shared their folk dances with individuals who resided in the regions they settled in. This hybrid dance became Bhangra. The dance started from just one move and evolved later on. It has been popularized by Punjabi artists from the Sikh communities, with which it is now commonly associated.[1] Today, Bhangra dance survives in different forms and styles all over the globe – including pop music, film soundtracks, collegiate competitions and even talent shows.

Thirayattam is a ritual performing dance of south malabar region (kozhikode and malappuram Dt:) in Kerala state. In Malayalam language, the word "Thirayattam" refers to a 'colourful dance'. This vibrant Ethnic art form blend of dance, instrumental music, drama, facial and body makeup, martial art and ritualistic Function. Thirayattam enacted in courtyards of sacred groves and village shrines, during Thirayattam festival.

== Drama ==
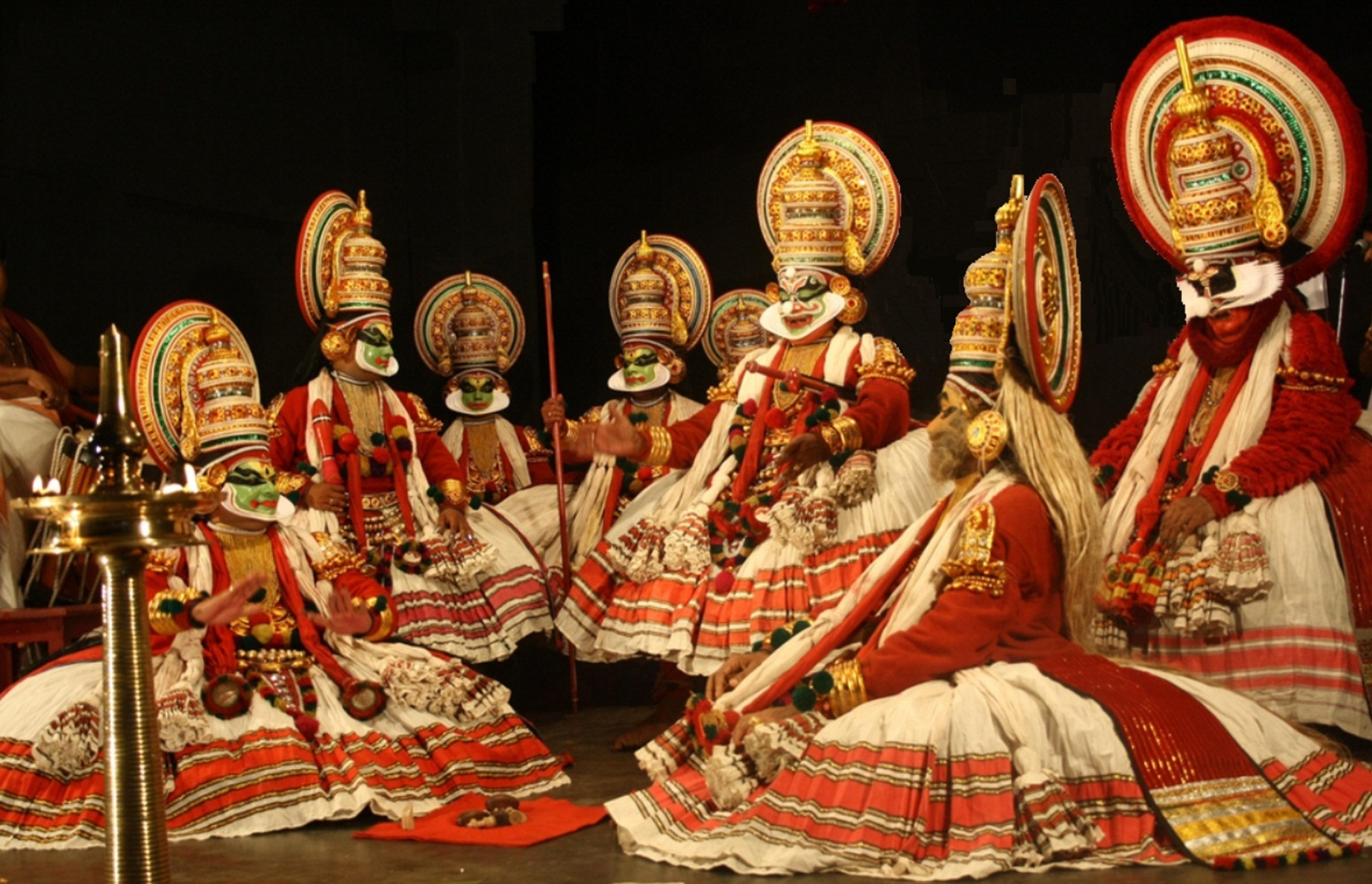
Kathakali one of the classical theatre forms from Kerala, India

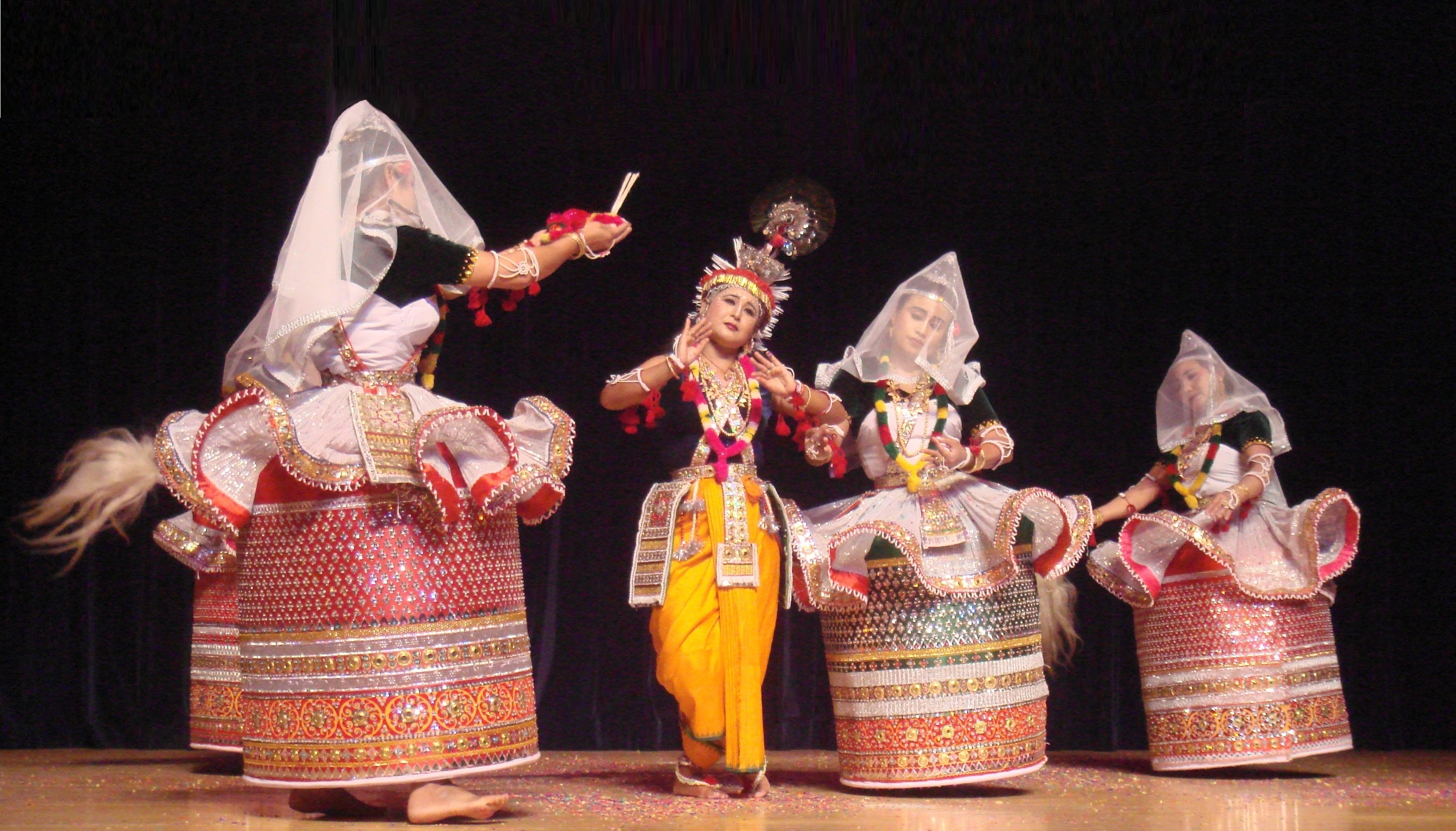
Rasa lila theatrical performance in Manipuri dance style

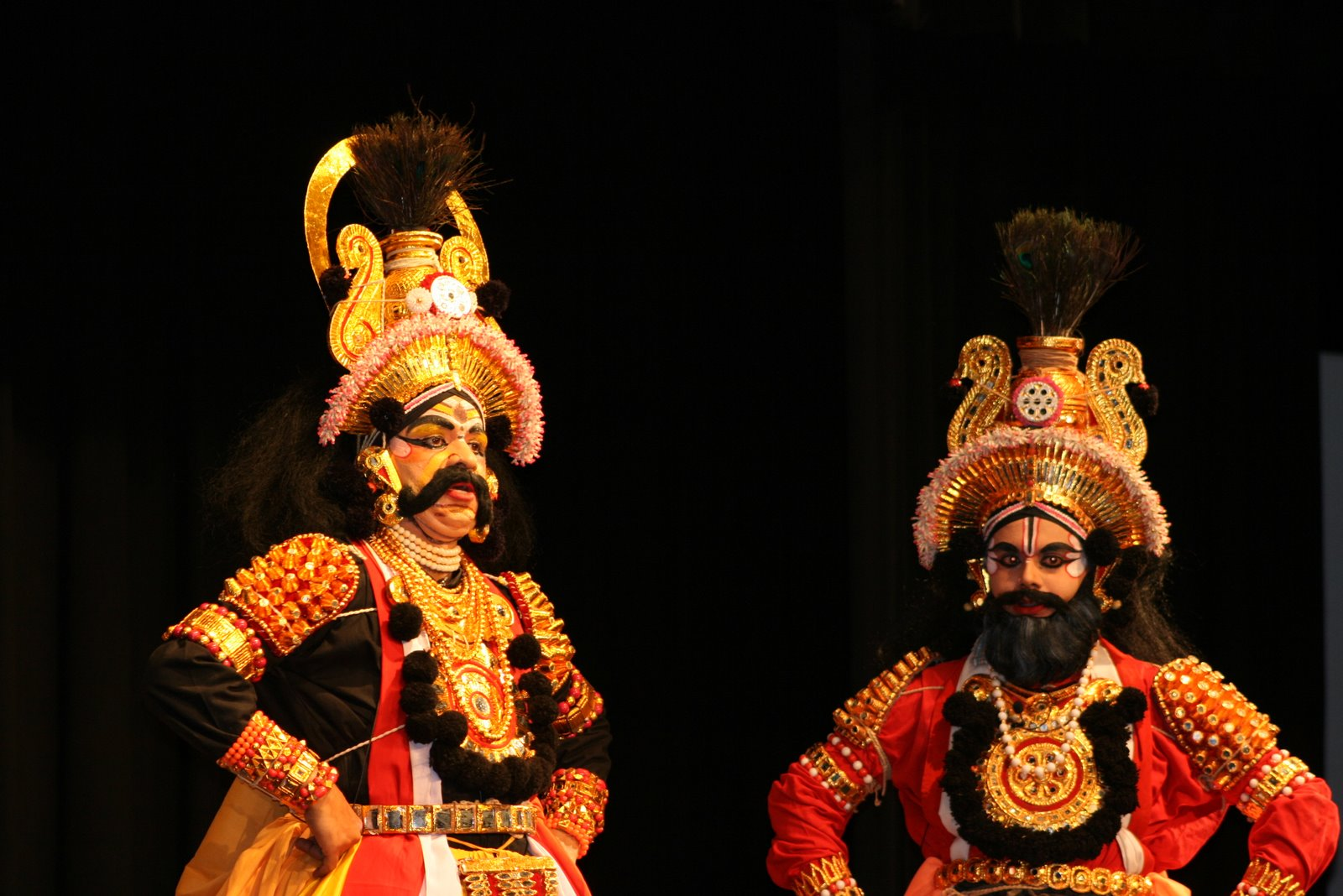
Yakshagana An Ancient dance drama of Tulunadu.

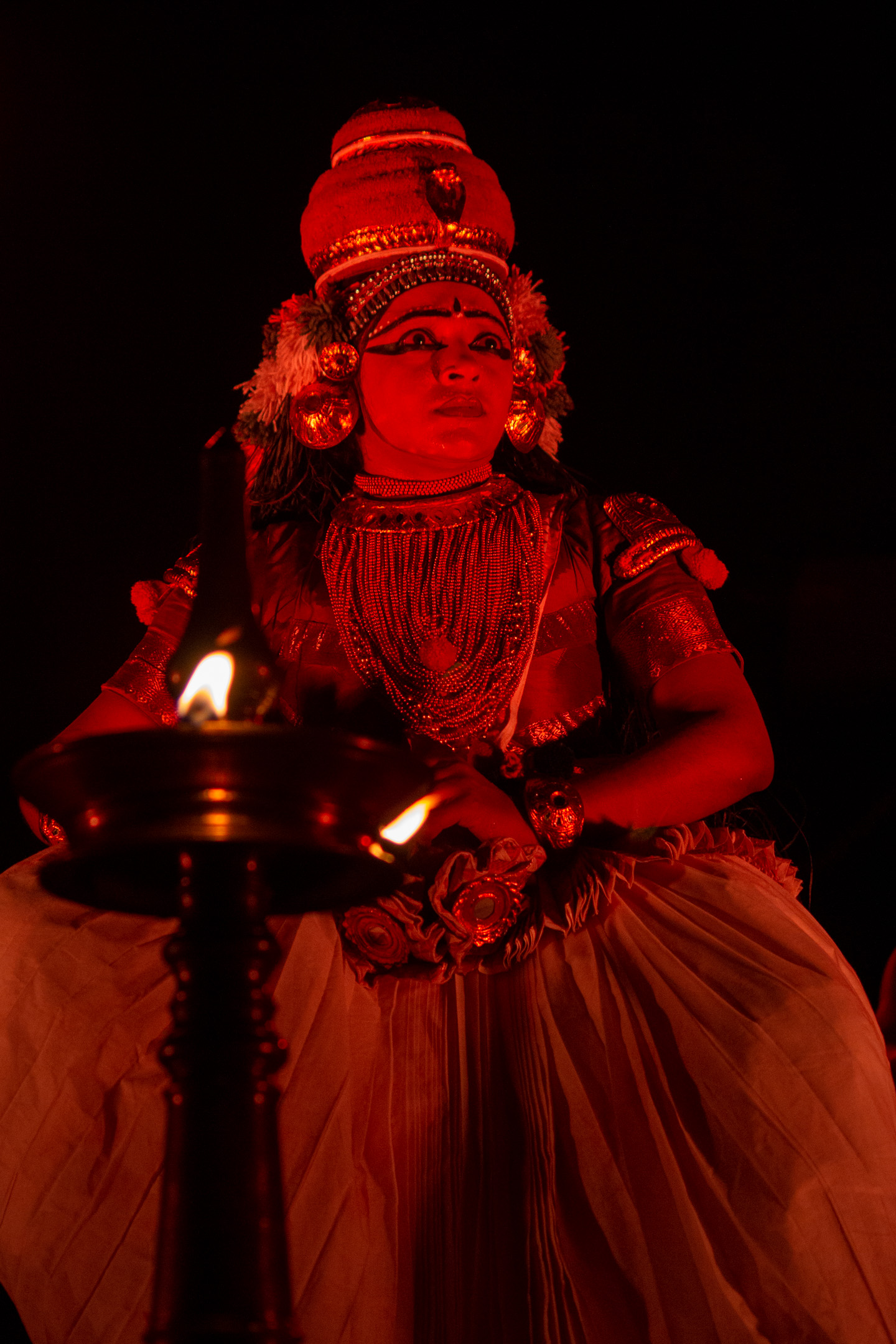
Koodiyattam performer Kapila Venu

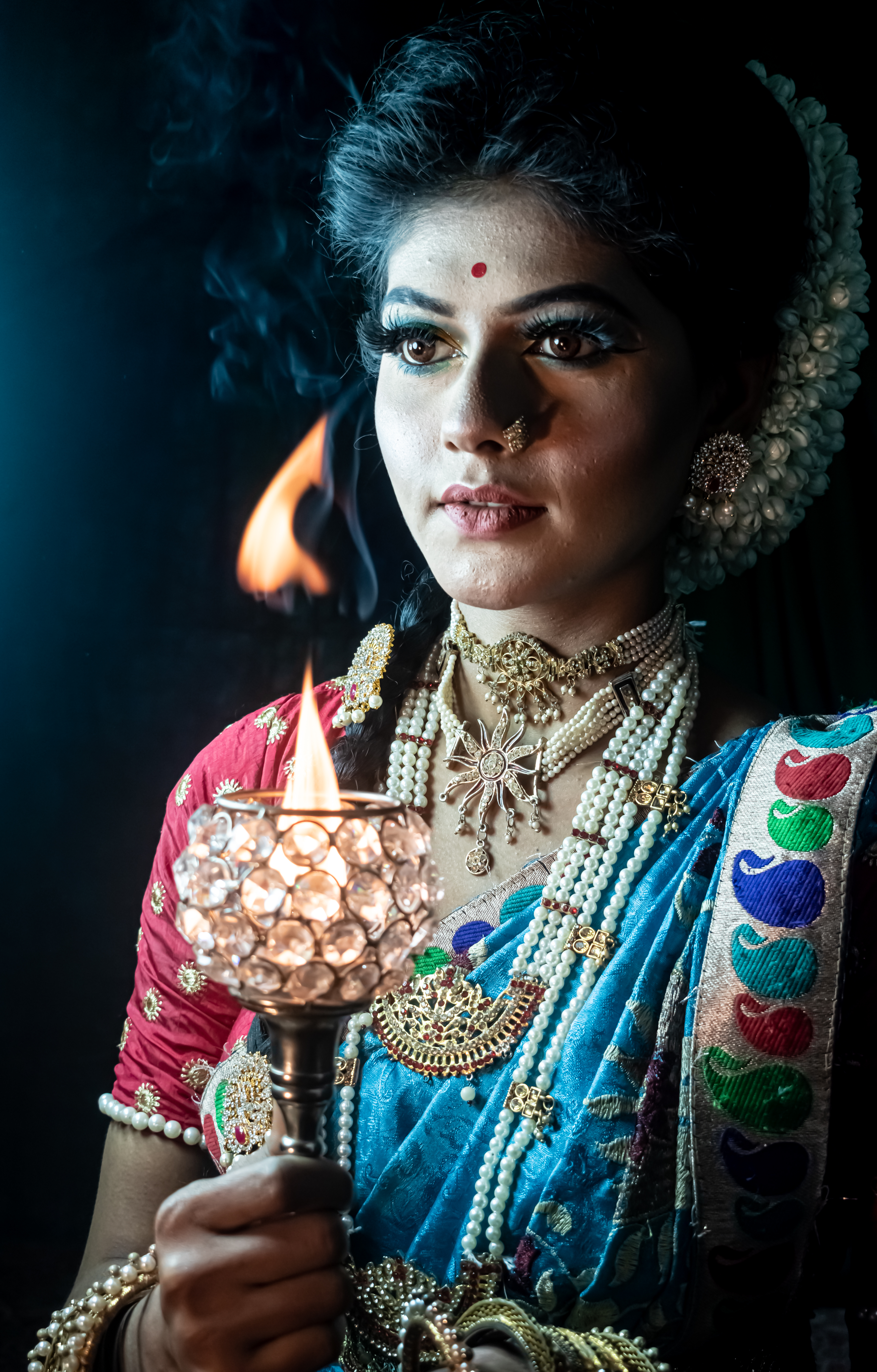
A still from play Nati Binodoni, Bengali Jatra Theatre. Jatra is a popular folk-theatre form of Bengali and Odia Theatre.

Indian drama and theatre has a long history alongside its music and dance. Kalidasa's plays like Shakuntala and Meghadoota are some of the older dramas, following those of Bhasa. Kutiyattam of Kerala, is the only surviving specimen of the ancient Sanskrit theatre, thought to have originated around the beginning of the Common Era, and is officially recognised by UNESCO as a Masterpiece of the Oral and Intangible Heritage of Humanity. It strictly follows the Natya Shastra. Nātyāchārya Māni Mādhava Chākyār is credited for reviving the age old drama tradition from extinction. He was known for mastery of Rasa Abhinaya. He started to perform the Kalidasa plays like Abhijñānaśākuntala, Vikramorvaśīya and Mālavikāgnimitra; Bhasa's Swapnavāsavadatta and Pancharātra; Harsha's Nagananda.

== Shadow play ==
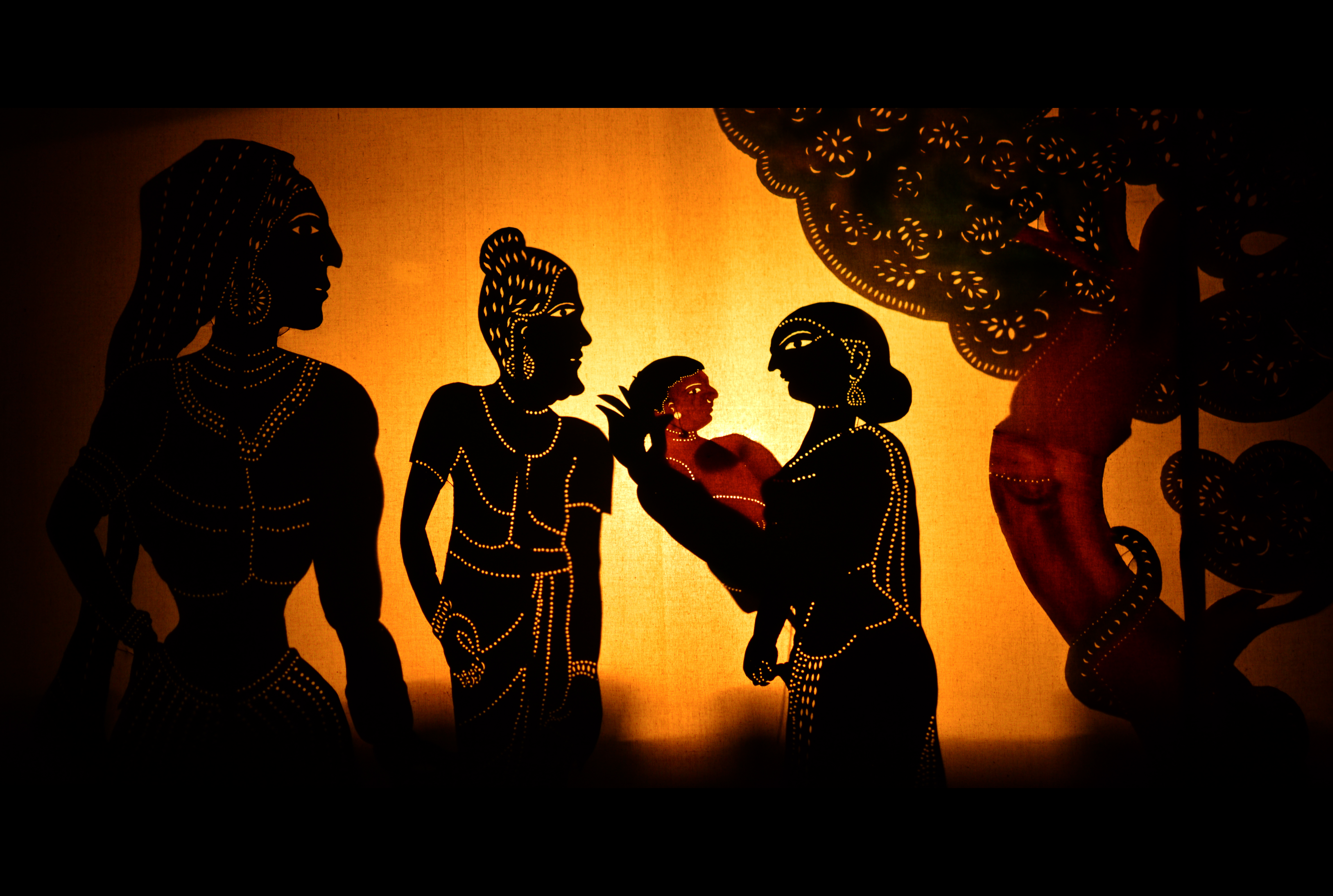
A scene from Tholpavakoothu shadow play.

Shadow puppets are an ancient part of India's culture and art, particularly regionally as the keelu bomme and Tholu bommalata of Andhra Pradesh, the Togalu gombeyaata in Karnataka, the charma bahuli natya in Maharashtra, the Ravana chhaya in Odisha, the Tholpavakoothu in Kerala and the thol bommalatta in Tamil Nadu. Shadow puppet play is also found in pictorial traditions in India, such as temple mural painting, loose-leaf folio paintings, and the narrative paintings. Dance forms such as the Chhau of Odisha literally mean "shadow". The shadow theatre dance drama theatre are usually performed on platform stages attached to Hindu temples, and in some regions these are called Koothu Madams or Koothambalams. In many regions, the puppet drama play is performed by itinerant artist families on temporary stages during major temple festivals. Legends from the Hindu epics Ramayana and the Mahabharata dominate their repertoire. However, the details and the stories vary regionally.

During the 19th century and early parts of the 20th century of the colonial era, Indologists believed that shadow puppet plays had become extinct in India, though mentioned in its ancient Sanskrit texts. In the 1930s and thereafter, states Stuart Blackburn, these fears of its extinction were found to be false as evidence emerged that shadow puppetry had remained a vigorous rural tradition in central Kerala mountains, most of Karnataka, northern Andhra Pradesh, parts of Tamil Nadu, Odisha and southern Maharashtra. The Marathi people, particularly of low caste, had preserved and vigorously performed the legends of Hindu epics as a folk tradition. The importance of Marathi artists is evidenced, states Blackburn, from the puppeteers speaking Marathi as their mother tongue in many non-Marathi speaking states of India.

A shadow play in Kerala
Ramayana legend, with audience response (45 seconds)

According to Beth Osnes, the tholu bommalata shadow puppet theatre dates back to the 3rd century BCE, and has attracted patronage ever since. The puppets used in a tholu bommalata performance, states Phyllis Dircks, are "translucent, lusciously multicolored leather figures four to five feet tall, and feature one or two articulated arms". The process of making the puppets is an elaborate ritual, where the artist families in India pray, go into seclusion, produce the required art work, then celebrate the "metaphorical birth of a puppet" with flowers and incense.

The tholu pava koothu of Kerala uses leather puppets whose images are projected on a backlit screen. The shadows are used to creatively express characters and stories in the Ramayana. A complete performance of the epic can take forty-one nights, while an abridged performance lasts as few as seven days. One feature of the tholu pava koothu show is that it is a team performance of puppeteers, while other shadow plays such as the wayang of Indonesia are performed by a single puppeteer for the same Ramayana story. There are regional differences within India in the puppet arts. For example, women play a major role in shadow play theatre in most parts of India, except in Kerala and Maharashtra. Almost everywhere, except Odisha, the puppets are made from tanned deer skin, painted and articulated. Translucent leather puppets are typical in Andhra Pradesh and Tamil Nadu, while opaque puppets are typical in Kerala and Odisha. The artist troupes typically carry over a hundred puppets for their performance in rural India.

== Sculpture ==
First sculptures in India date back to the Indus Valley Civilization, where stone and bronze carvings have been discovered. This is one of the earliest instances of sculpture in the world. Later, as Hinduism, Buddhism and Jainism developed further, India produced some of the most intricate bronzes in the world, as well as unrivalled temple carvings. Some huge shrines, such as the one at Ellora were not actually constructed using blocks, but instead carved out of solid rock, making them perhaps the largest and most intricate sculptures in the world.

During the 2nd to 1st century BCE in far northern India, in what is now southern Afghanistan and northern Pakistan, sculptures became more explicit, representing episodes of the Buddha's life and teachings. Although India had a long sculptural tradition and a mastery of rich iconography, the Buddha was never represented in human form before this time, but only through some of his symbols. This may be because Gandharan Buddhist sculpture in modern Afghanistan displays Greek and Persian artistic influence. Artistically, the Gandharan school of sculpture is said to have contributed wavy hair, drapery covering both shoulders, shoes and sandals, acanthus leaf decorations, etc.

The pink sandstone sculptures of Mathura evolved during the Gupta period (4th to 6th century) to reach a very high fineness of execution and delicacy in the modeling. Newer sculptures in Afghanistan, in stucco, schist or clay, display very strong blending of Indian post-Gupta mannerism and Classical influence, Hellenistic or possibly even Greco-Roman. Meanwhile, elsewhere in India, less anatomically accurate styles of human representation evolved, leading to the classical art that the world is now familiar with, and contributing to Buddhist and Hindu sculpture throughout Asia. If you would like more information on this topic please let us recommend.

A selection of Indian sculptures of various ages and styles

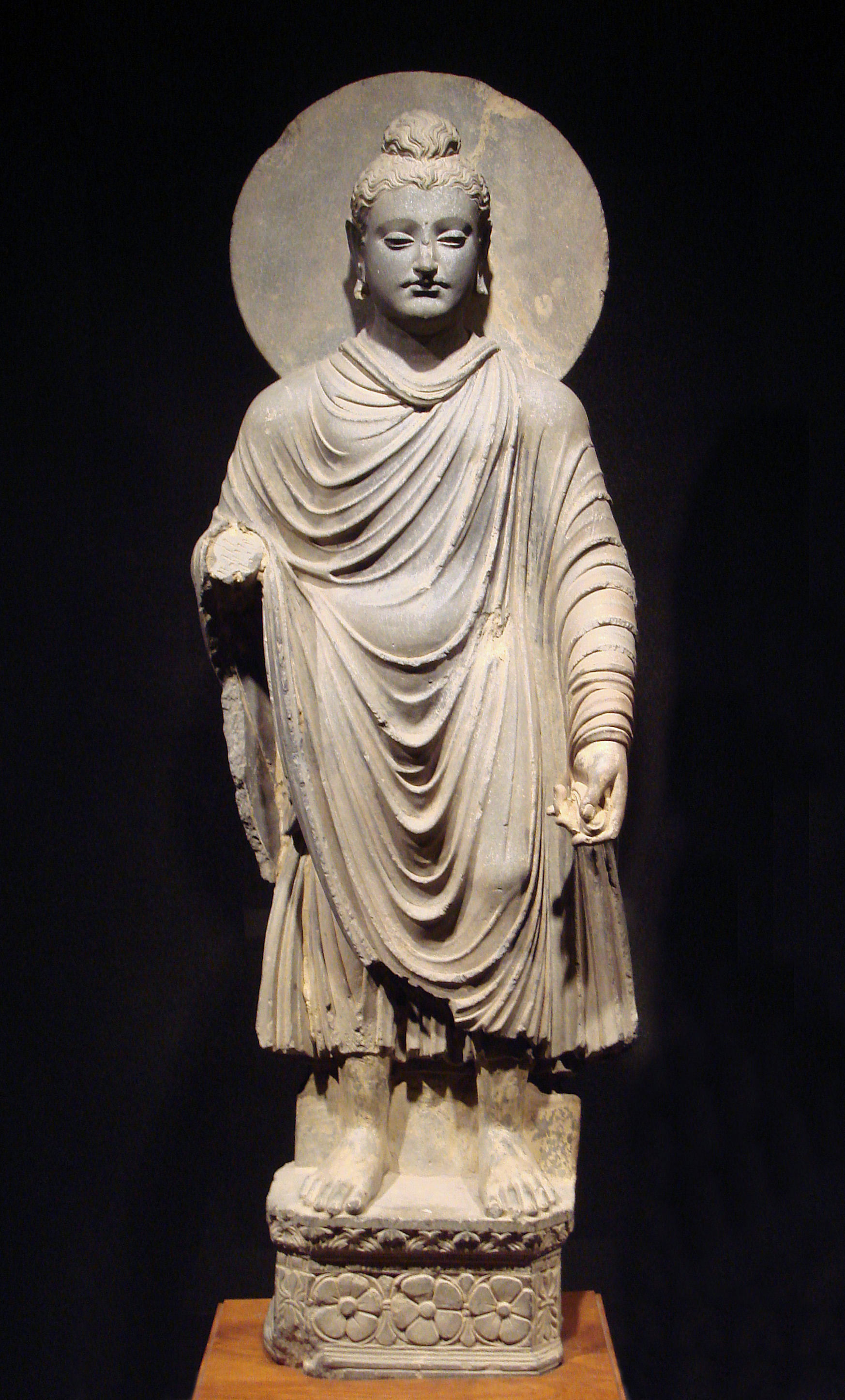

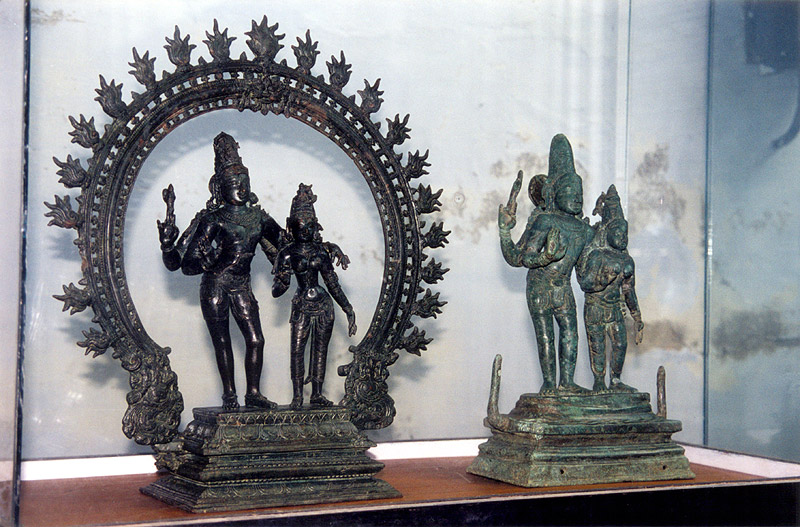

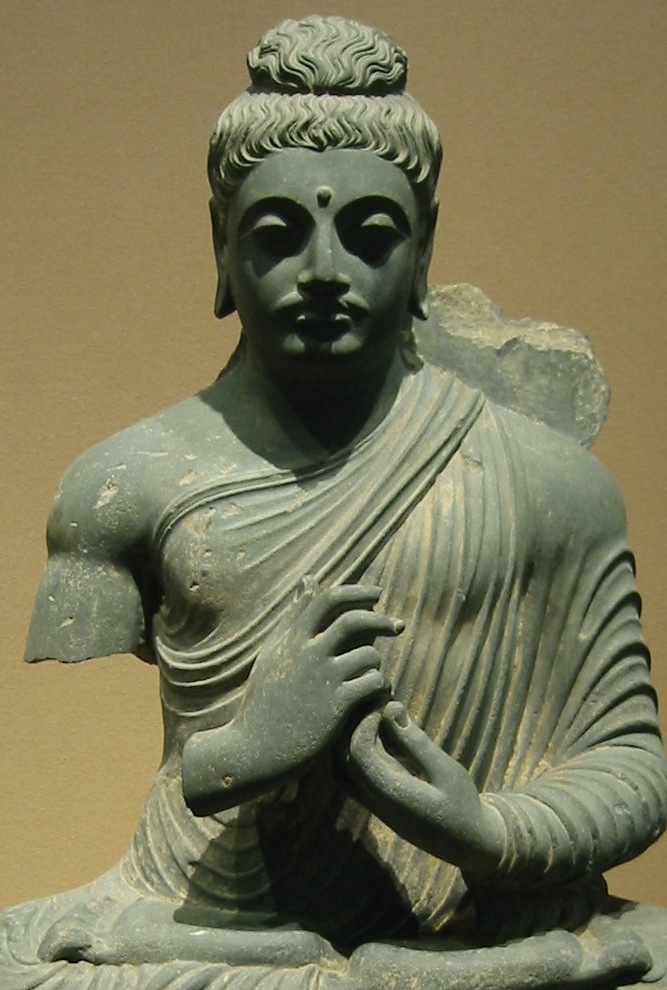

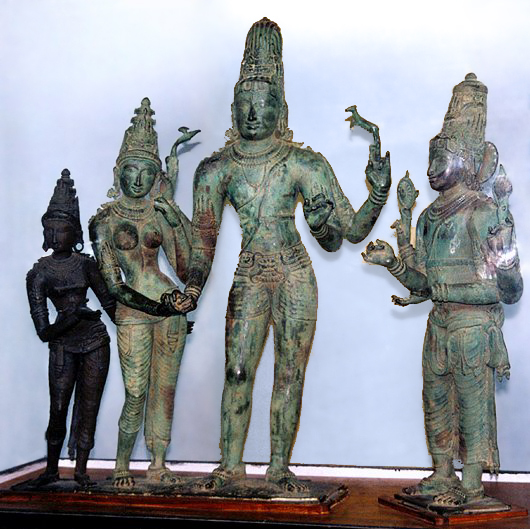

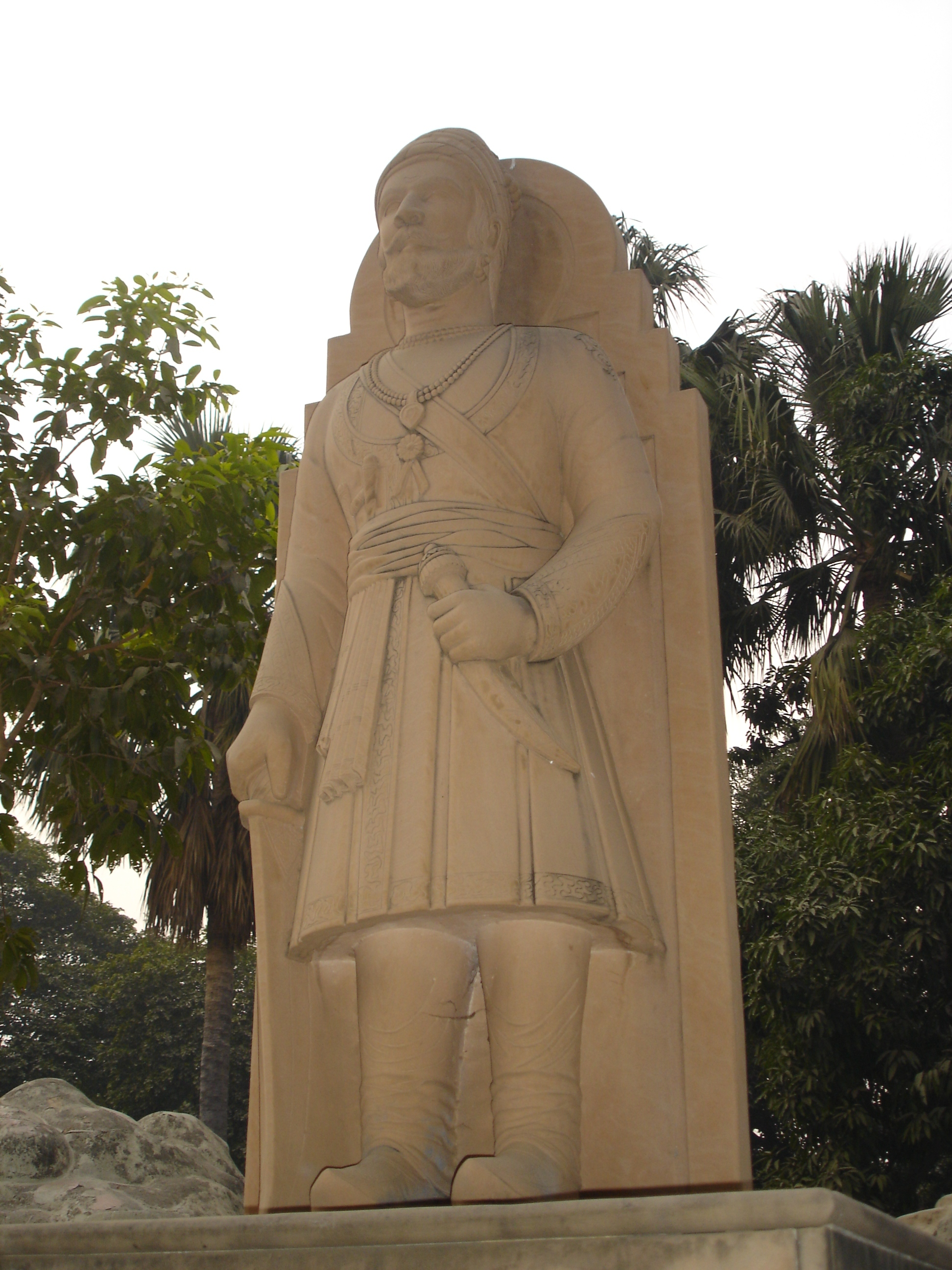

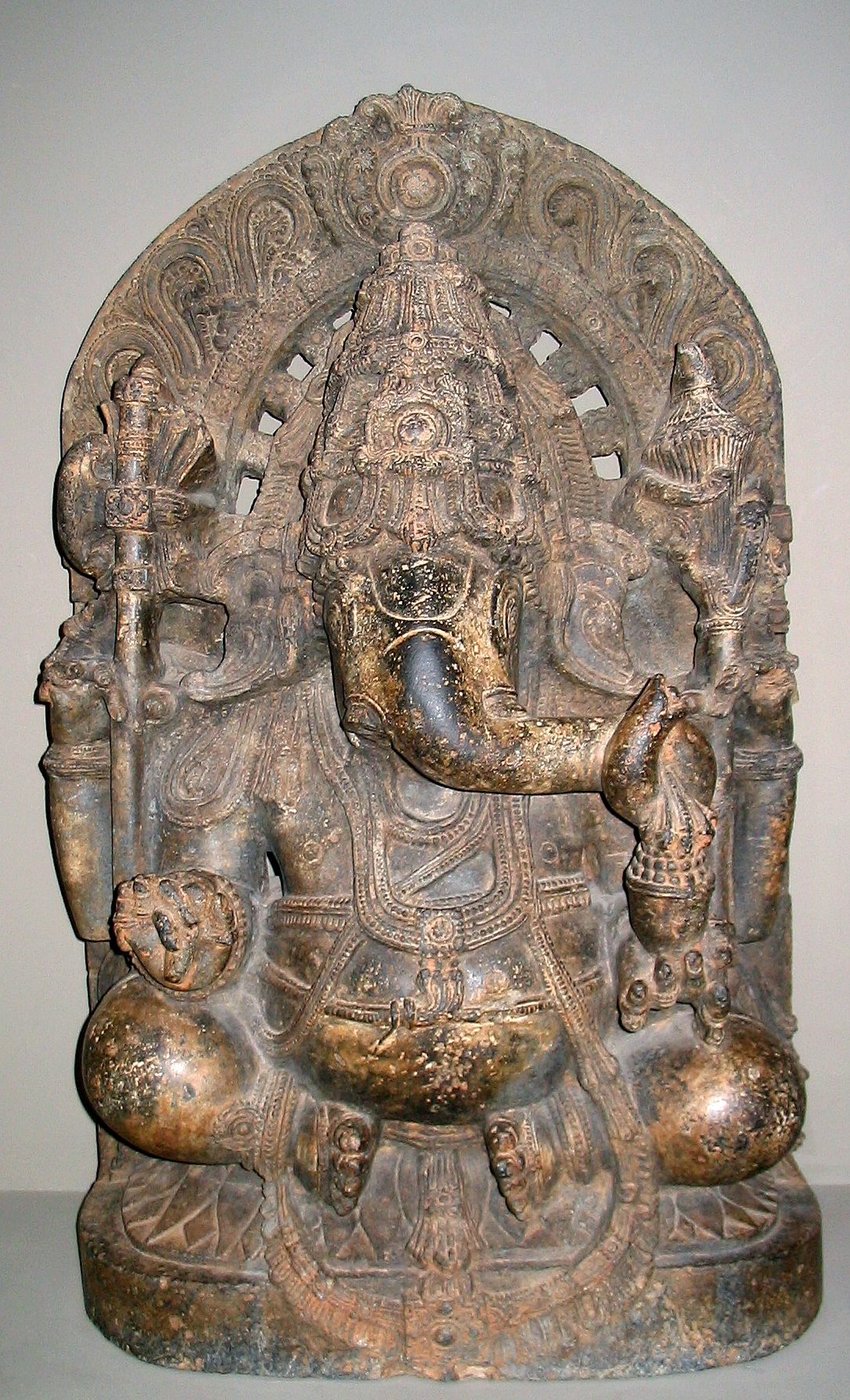

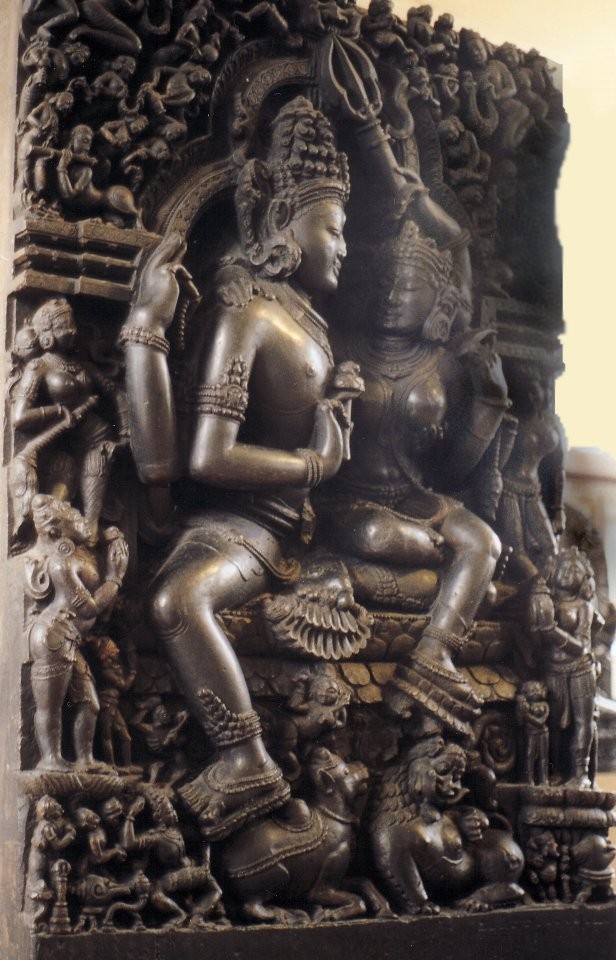

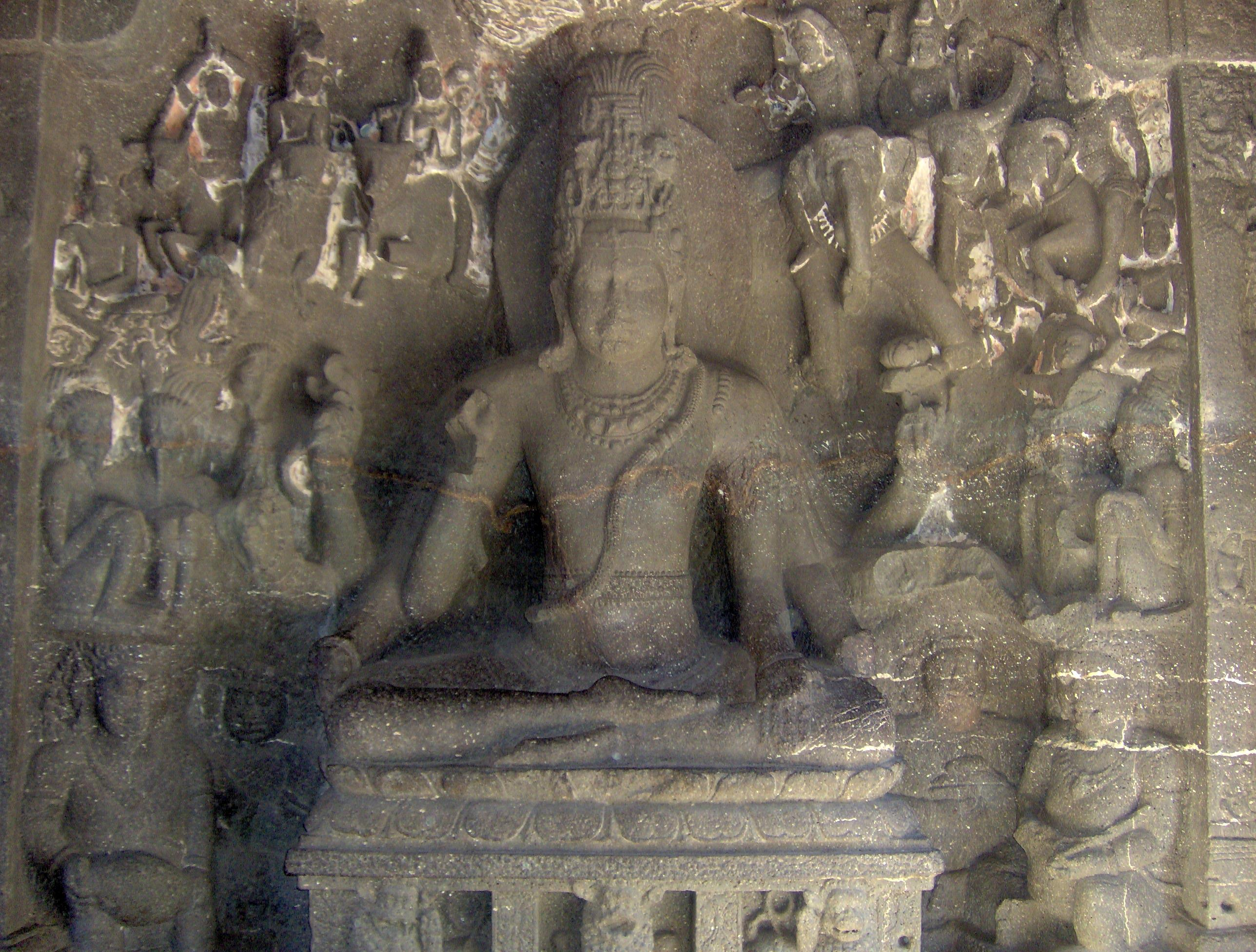

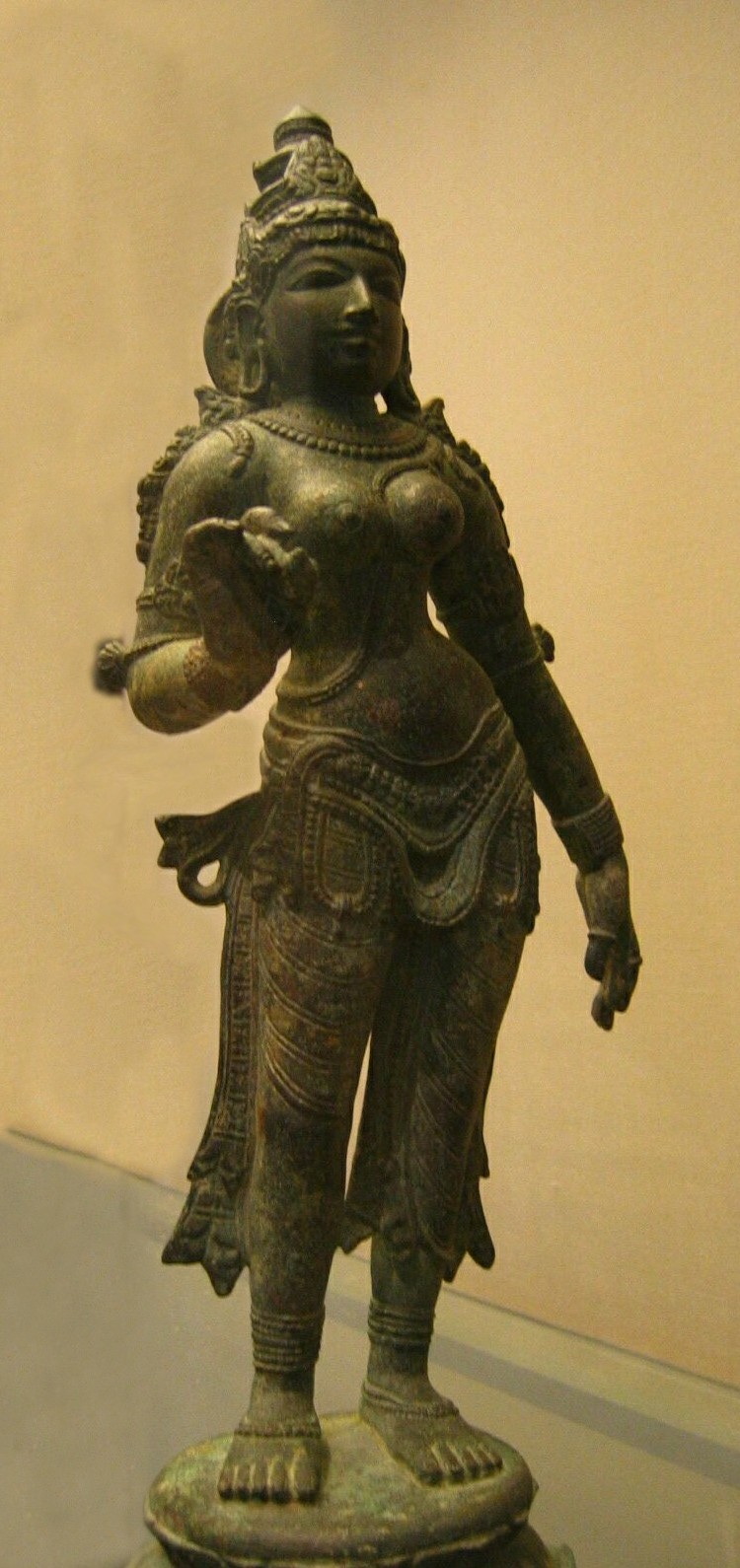

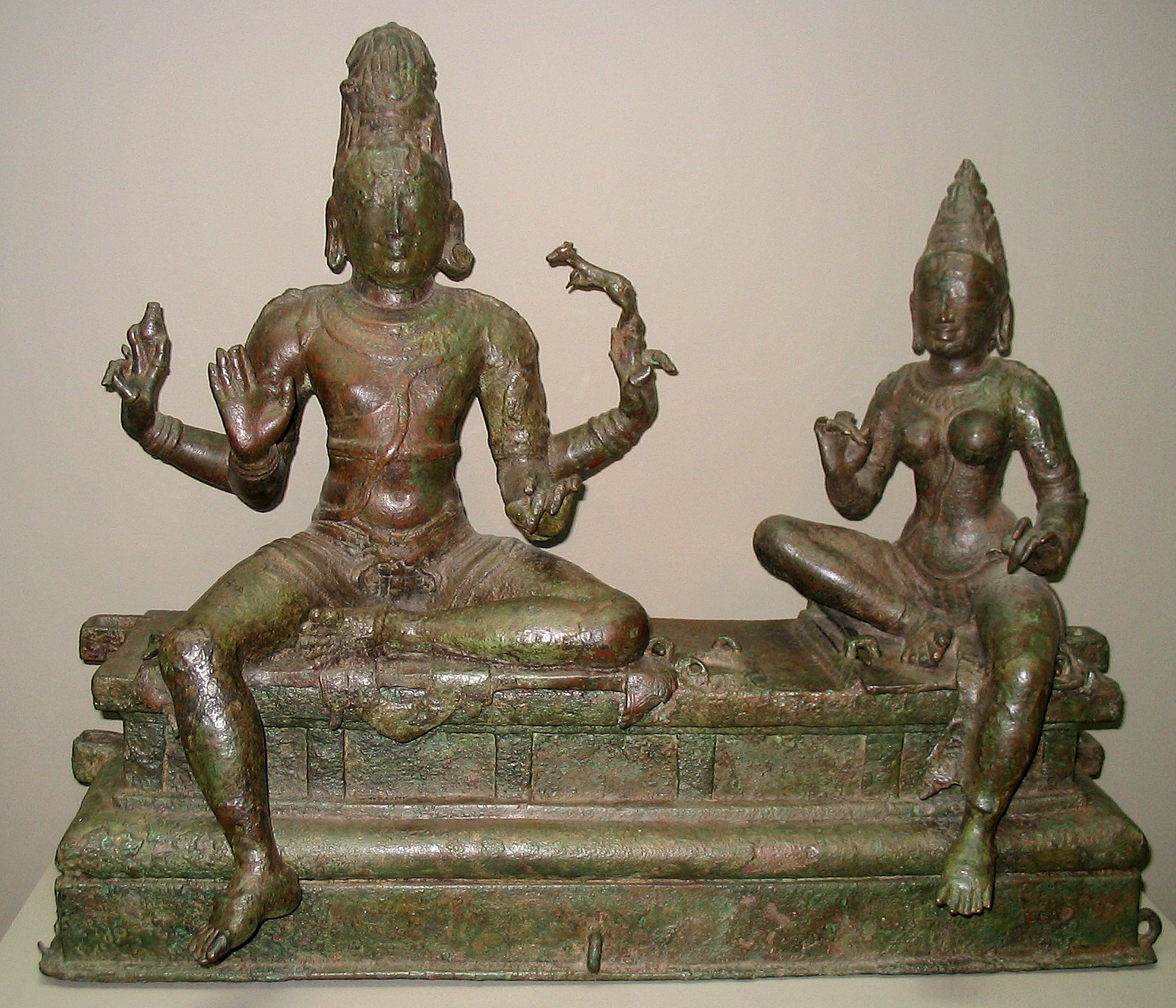

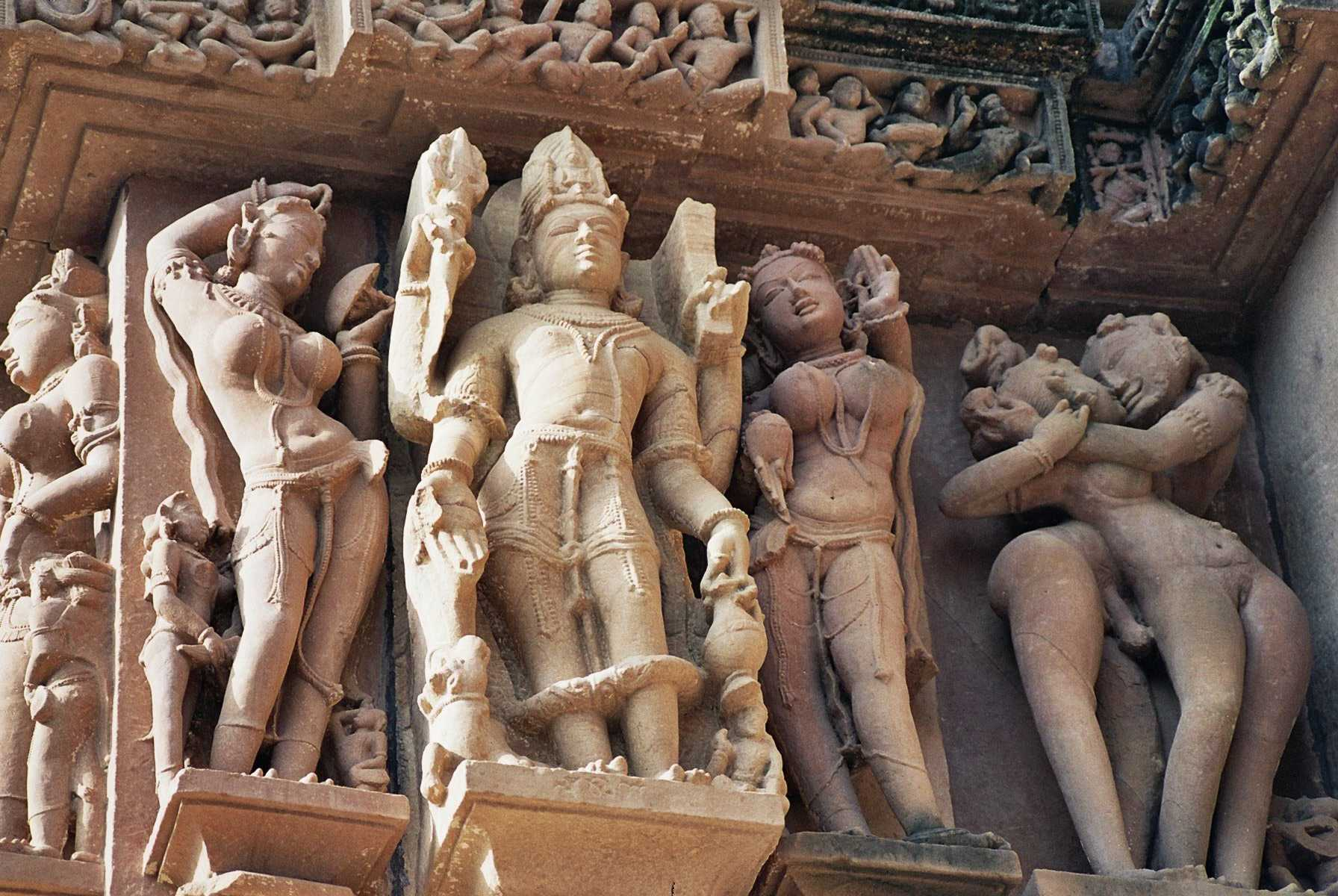

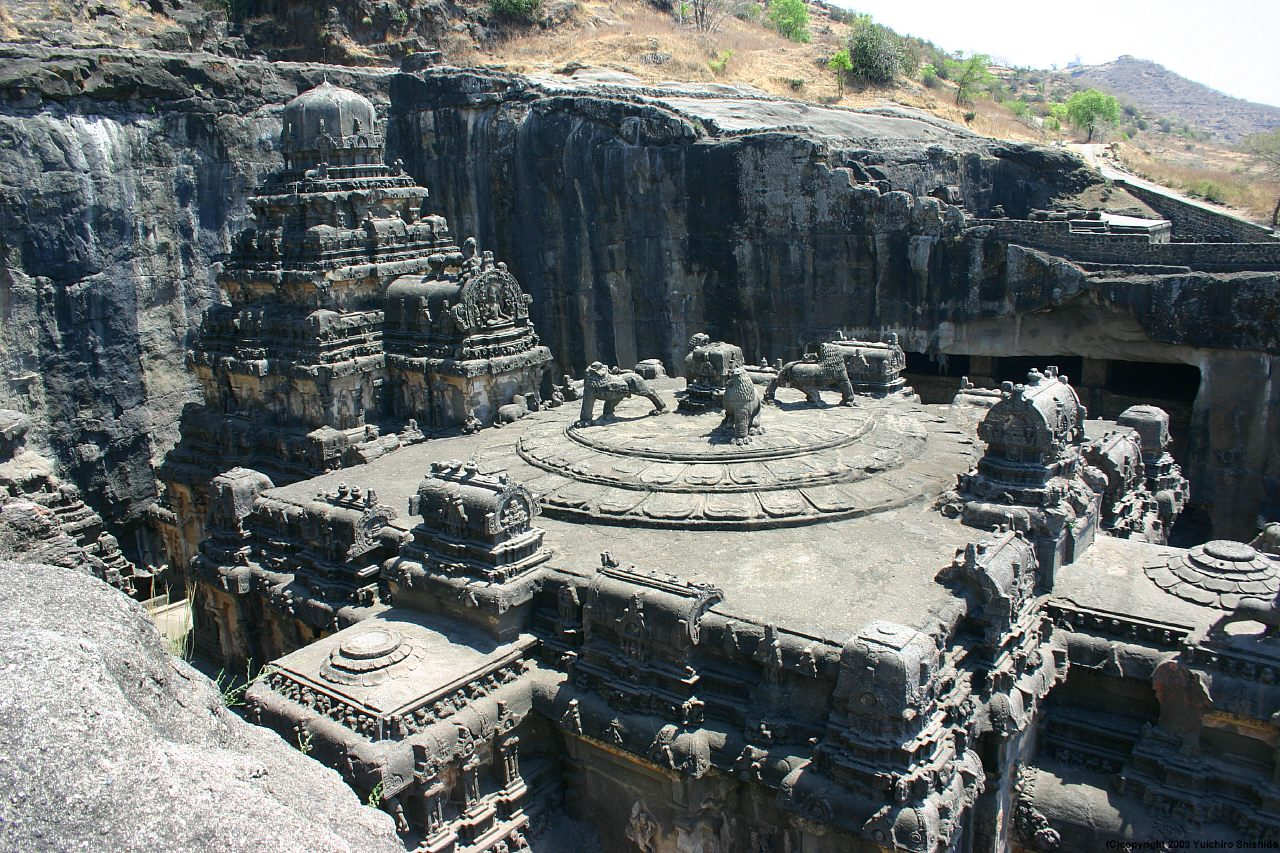

== Painting ==
The earliest Indian paintings were the rock paintings of pre-historic times, the petroglyphs as found in places like Rock Shelters of Bhimbetka, and some of them are older than 5500 BC. Such works continued and after several millennia, in the 7th century, carved pillars of Ellora, Maharashtra state present an example of Indian paintings, and the colors, mostly various shades of red and orange, were derived from minerals. Thereafter, frescoes of Ajanta and Ellora caves appeared. India's Buddhist literature is replete with examples of texts which describe that palaces of kings and aristocratic class were embellished with paintings, but they have not survived. But, it is believed that some form of art painting was practiced in that time.

Indian Art was given a new lease of life by the British in early 19th century when the new government required painters to document Indian life and times. The English School paintings, as these new art were called had seen the emergence of India's greatest artists of all times Raja Ravi Verma. Other important artists of the Colonial period include Jamini Roy, Amrita Sher-Gil, Ramkinkar Baij and Rabindranath Tagore. After independence, Indian art became more diverse and artists like M. F. Husain, F. N. Souza, Subodh Gupta, Devajyoti Ray, Sudip Roy, Paresh Maity and Bose Krishnamachari earned international recognition.

Indian art, ancient and medieval

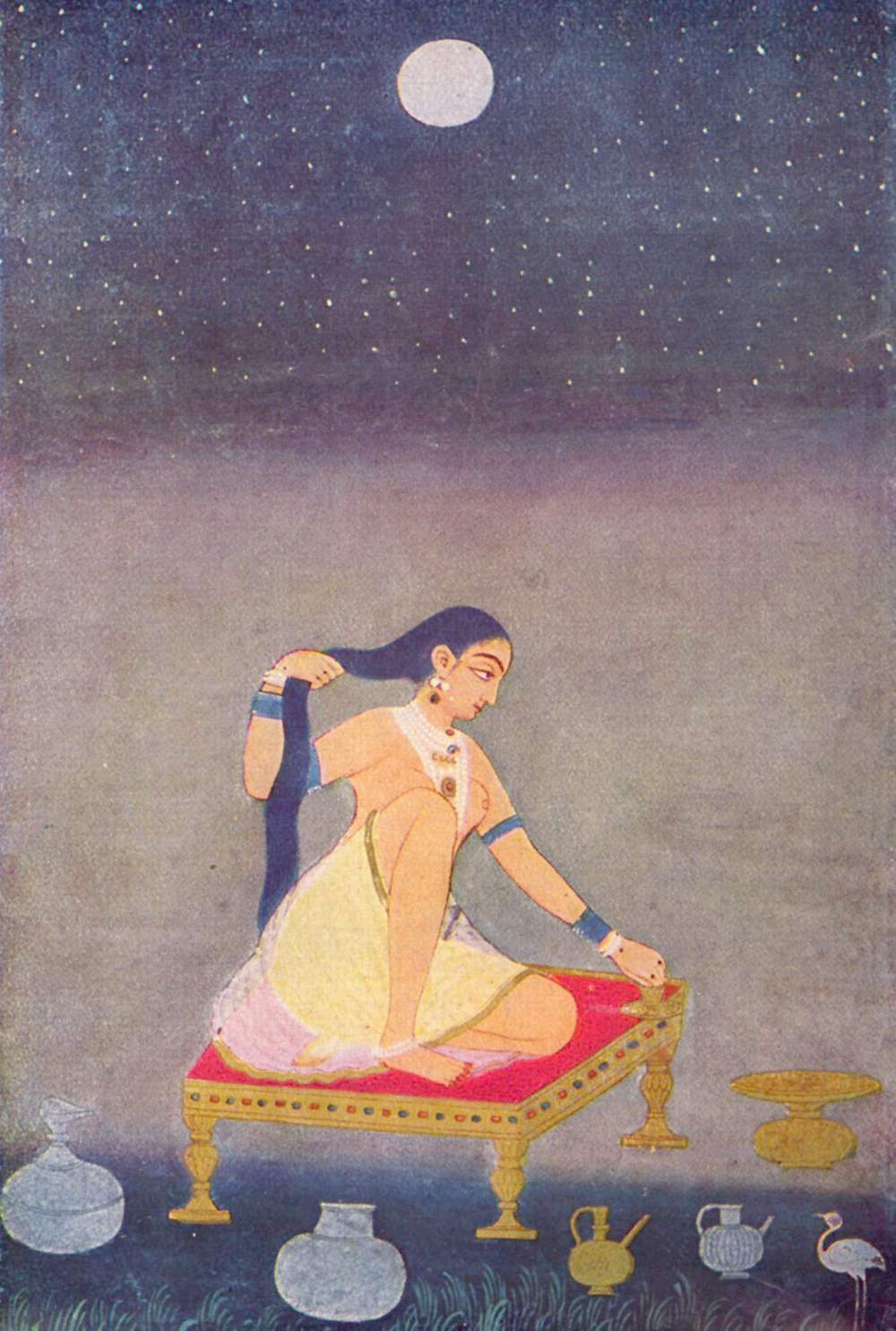

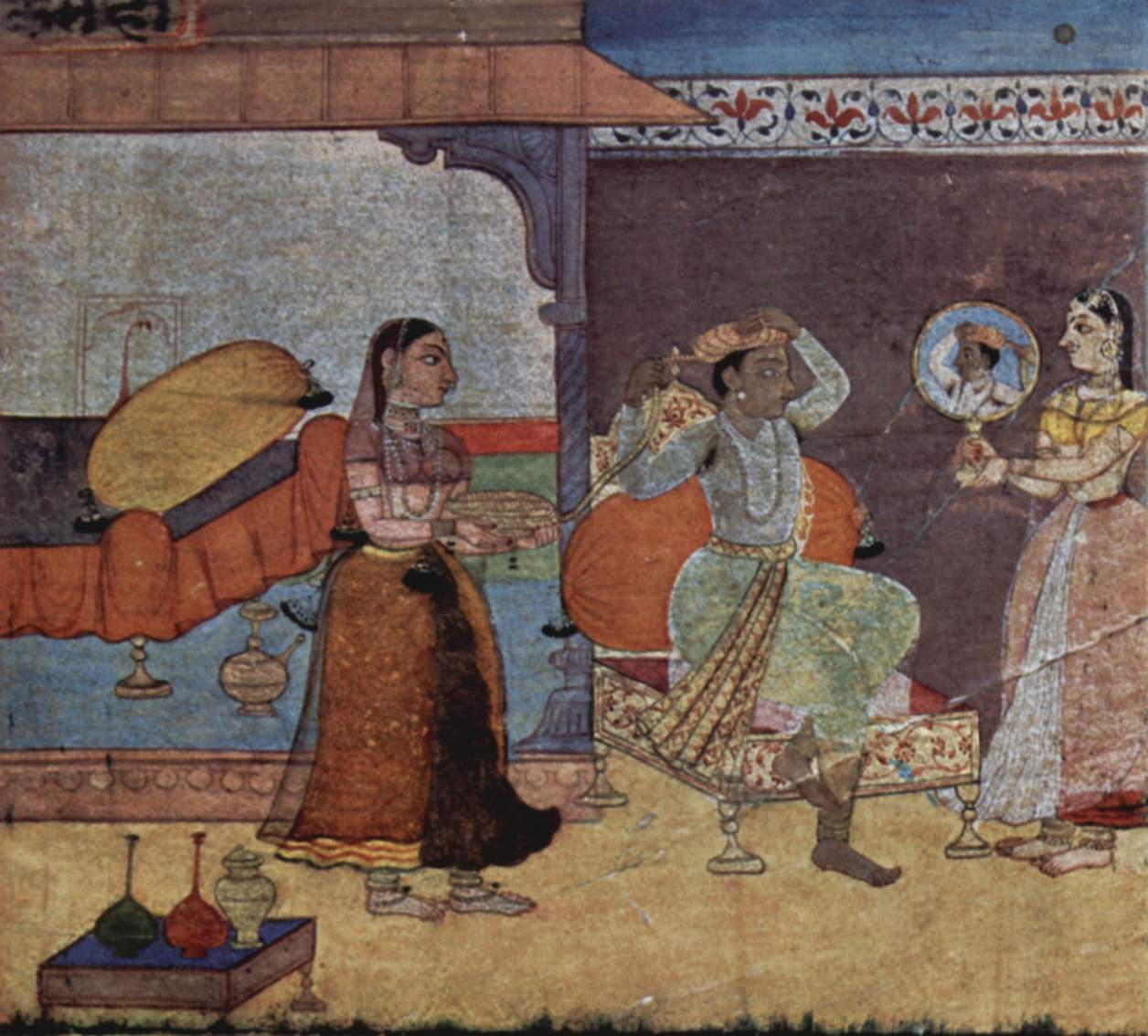

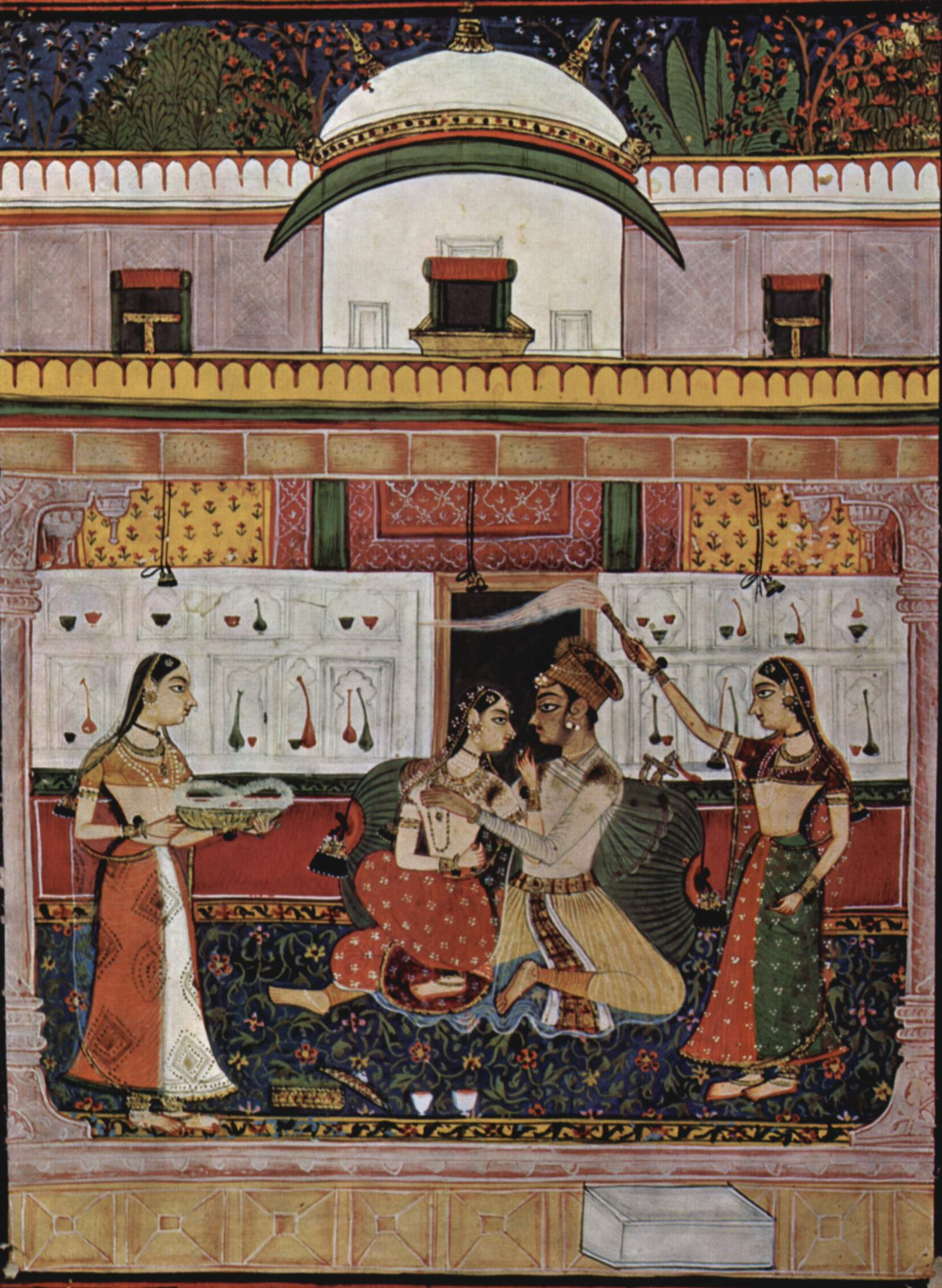

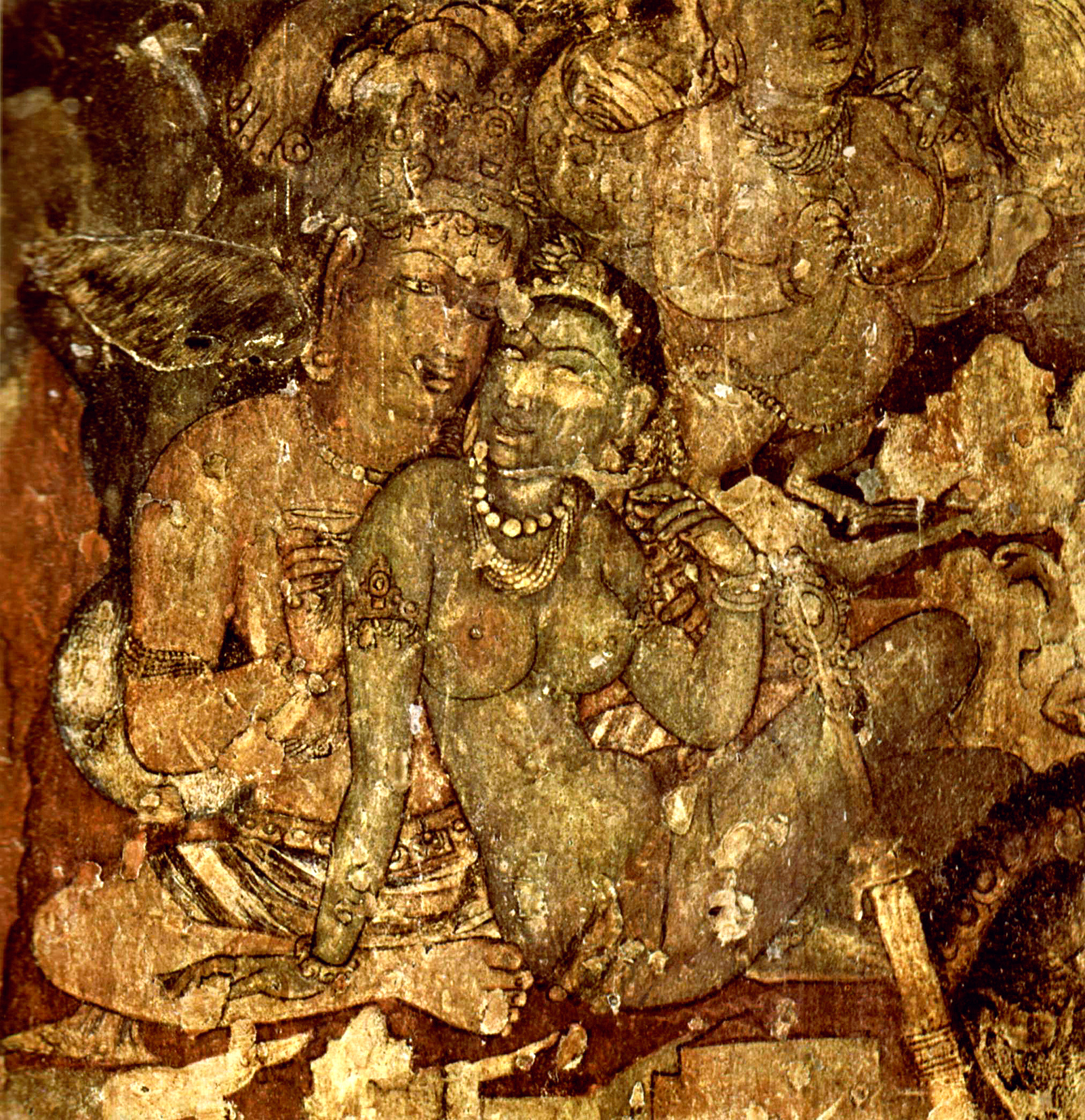

== Cinema ==
India is a major regional center for cinema. The Indian film industry is the second largest in the world (1200 movies released in the year 2002). Each of the larger jrods supports its own film industry: Hindi, Bengali, Kannada, Tamil, Telugu, Malayalam, Odia. The Hindi/Urdu film industry, based in Mumbai, formerly Bombay, is called Bollywood (a melding of Hollywood and Bombay). Similar neologisms have been coined for the Kannada (Karnataka State) film industry (Sandalwood) based on Karnataka being known for Sandalwood, Tamil film industry (Kollywood, from the Kodambakkam district of Chennai) and the Telugu film industry (Tollywood). Tollygunge is a metonym for the Bengali film industry, long centered in the Tollygunge district of Kolkata. The Bengali language industry is notable as including the director Satyajit Ray, an international filmmaker and a winner of many awards, among them the Bharat Ratna (India's highest civilian award), the Légion d'honneur (France), and the Lifetime achievement Academy Award. Odia film industry is known as Ollywood and it has a history of film making since 1936. The Bollywood industry is usually the largest in terms of films produced and box office receipts, just as Urdu/Hindi speakers outnumber speakers of other Indian languages within India.

== Radio ==
Radio broadcasting was, until recently a government monopoly under the Directorate General of All India Radio—established in 1936 and since 1957 also known as Akashvani—a government-owned, semicommercial operation of the Ministry of Information and Broadcasting. From only six stations at the time of independence, All India Radio's network had expanded by the mid-1990s to 146 AM stations plus a National Channel, the Integrated North-East Service (aimed at tribal groups in northeast India), and the External Service. There are five regional headquarters for All India Radio: the North Zone in New Delhi; the North-East Zone in Guwahati, Assam; the East Zone in Calcutta; the West Zone in Bombay; and the South Zone in Madras. All India Radio covers 99.37% of India's populace.

The government-owned network provides both national and local programs in Hindi, English, and sixteen regional languages. Commercial services, which were inaugurated in 1957, are provided by Vividh Bharati Service, headquartered in Mumbai. Vividh Bharati, which accepts advertisements, broadcasts from thirty-one AM and FM stations in the mid-1990s.

India has an extensive network of medium wave and shortwave stations. In 1994 there were eighty-five FM stations and seventy-three shortwave stations that covered the entire country. The broadcasting equipment is mostly Indian made and reaches special audiences, such as farmers needing agroclimatic, plant protection, and other agriculture-related information. The number of radio receivers increased almost fivefold between 1970 and 1994, from around 14 million to nearly 65 million. Most radios are also produced within India.

The foreign broadcast service is a function of the External Services Division of All India Radio. In 1994 seventy hours of news, features, and entertainment programs were broadcast daily in twenty-five languages using thirty-two shortwave transmitters. The principal target audiences are listeners in neighbouring countries and the large overseas Indian community.

Satellite Radio was introduced to the Indian market in 2000 by WorldSpace, a Washington DC–based company. Currently WorldSpace beams 30 channels comprising music, news, and regional channels, a subscriber in India pays ₹1,200 per annum. In addition, some premium channels are available at an extra cost. This service requires special receivers which are often subsidized by world space.

Recently The Department of Space (DoS) indicated it is exploring the possibility of setting up a multi-media satellite platform that would include satellite radio, video and data channels.

== Television ==
Television service is available throughout the country. Doordarshan is a government-owned broadcaster established in 1959 and a part of All India Radio until 1976. It operates of one national network and seven regional networks. In 1992 there were sixty-three high-power television transmitters, 369 medium-power transmitters, seventy-six low-power transmitters, and twenty-three transposers. Regular satellite transmissions began in 1982 (the same year colour transmission began). By 1994 some six million people were receiving television broadcasts via satellite, and the number was expected to increase rapidly throughout the rest of the decade. Cable television was even more prolific, with an estimated 12 to 15 million subscribers in 1994. Besides Doordarshan, Zee TV—an independent station broadcasting from Mumbai since 1992—uses satellite transmissions. In fact, because Doordarshan is the only network that is permitted to broadcast television signals domestically, Zee TV and other entrepreneurs broadcast their Indian-made videotapes via foreign transmitters. Other networks joining the fray are Cable News Network (1990); Asia Television Network (1991); Hong Kong–based Star TV (1991); Jain TV, near Bombay (1994); EL TV, a spin-off of Zee TV in Bombay (1994); HTV, an affiliate of the Hindustan Times in New Delhi (1994); and Sun TV, a Tamil language service in Chennai (1994). In a communications breakthrough in July 1995, Doordarshan agreed, for a US$1.5 million annual fee and 50 percent of advertising revenue when it exceeds US$1.5 million, to allow CNN to broadcast twenty-four hours a day via an Indian satellite. regional, and local service. The number of television sets increased from around 500,000 in 1976 to 9 million in early 1987 and to around 47 million in 1994; increases are expected to continue at around six million sets per year. More than 75 percent of television sets were black and white models in 1992, but the proportion of colour sets is increasing annually. Most television sets are produced in India.

=== Professional events ===
- Lakme Fashion Week
- Ponds Femina Miss India
- Global Festival of Films on Peace and Spirituality

=== Amateur events ===
- Culfests in India
