= Nathaniel Middleton =

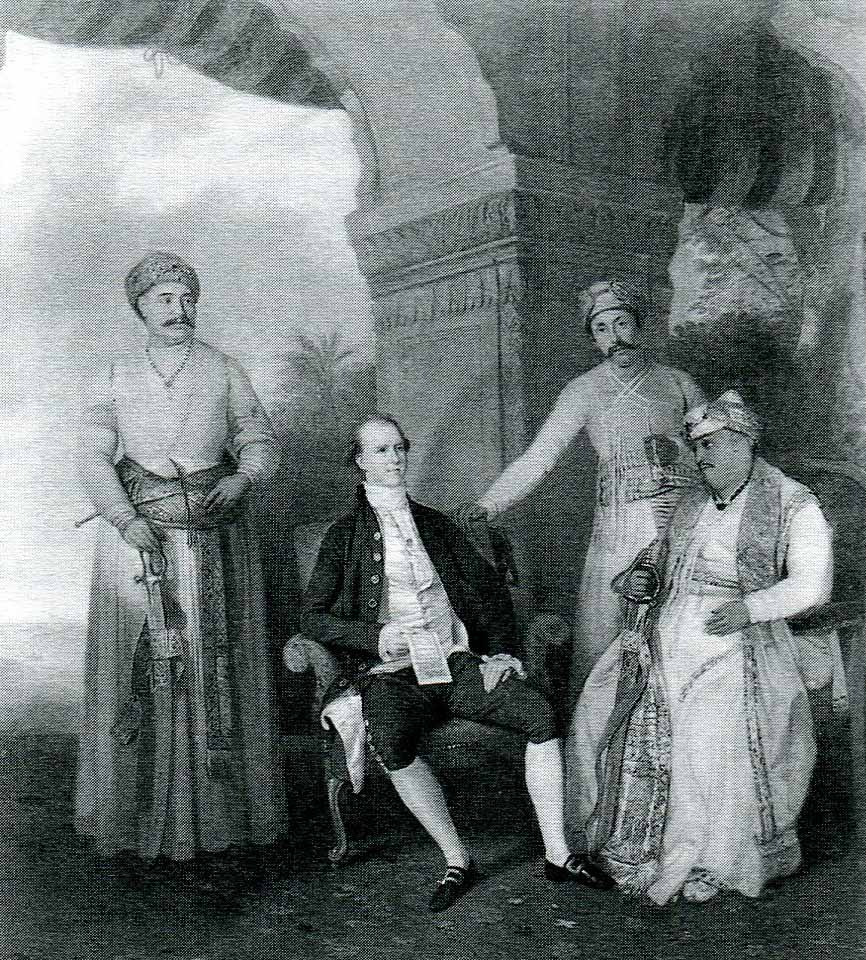
Middleton with Asaf-ud-Daula sit with two Rajas behind them, painted by Tilly Kettle, c. 1784, at the time of Middleton taking up the position of Resident

Nathaniel Middleton (1750–1807) was a civil servant of the British East India Company, closely involved with Warren Hastings and his dealings with the Nawab of Awadh during the 1770s, and later a principal witness at Hastings's trial.

== Background and period in India ==
The son of the Rev. Samuel Middleton (1703–1758), perpetual curate of Whitmore, Staffordshire, and his wife Mary, he was in British India as an East India Company writer by 1769. In 1773, with encouragement from his elder brother Samuel Middleton, Warren Hastings sent Nathaniel Middleton to the Awadh court at Lucknow, representing British interests with Shuja ud-Daula. This was the period of the First Rohilla War in which Awadh was allied to the British.

Shuja ud-Daula was properly the Nawab Wazir, since the wizarat of Delhi had been added to Awadh by his father, and is commonly known as the Wazir. Since the Battle of Buxar of 1764, in which Shuja ud-Daula and Awadh were on the losing side, Awadh had been falling into the orbit of British India, and had troops stationed for which it was required to pay. The Treaty of Benares of 1773 ratified the situation.

In 1774 Hastings was overruled in his policy by the Bengal Council and a combination of John Clavering, Philip Francis and George Monson. Middleton was replaced at Lucknow, where John Bristow took his place; but after Monson's death in 1776 Hastings reinstated him, the Wazir having in the meantime died and been replaced by his son Asaf-ud-Daula. Further changes occurred when Hastings in 1779 deferred to Eyre Coote's view that Middleton should be replaced by Charles Lambert Purling; but after a year Purling was recalled, and the responsibilities as Resident at Lucknow were divided between Bristow and Middleton, who was given financial duties. Bristow then had to step down in 1781.

Developments by 1782 caused Hastings to lose patience with the Wazir, who owed large sums of money. Middleton and a British force recovered funds directly, including from the Fyzabad palace. They used force, and distraint against the Wazir's mother Bahu Begam (the Begum), with threats to her staff. Hastings lost confidence in Middleton's proceedings with the Wazir, sending a negotiator and then removing Middleton by the autumn, to be replaced by Bristow.

Middleton, who had married in 1780, left the East India Company's service in 1784 and returned to England, having requested leave to depart on the Barwell from Hastings. John Charles Middleton who requested leave at the same time was Nathaniel's brother.

=== Commerce in Awadh ===
Francis, with polemical intent against Hastings, wrote of Middleton as "uncrowned king" of Awadh. He developed commercial interests there, including a saltpetre monopoly, and brought in British merchants. His business contacts included the Dutch East India Company, and he received a large related payment through the London counting-house Rumbold, Charlton & Raikes. One of the merchants who prospered under Middleton was John Pendred Scott, involved on a large scale in cotton goods at Tanda; he used Middleton's London account for clearing Dutch payments.

== Later life ==
Bringing home an Indian fortune, Middleton became one of the reputed group of civilian nabobs in Great Britain, mentioned with Richard Barwell, Paul Benfield, Thomas Rumbold, and Sir Francis Sykes, 1st Baronet. He lived initially in Wimpole Street, London, and then in 1788 purchased the Townhill estate in what now is Southampton. He employed Thomas Leverton for building work there in 1792. The 1792 house was altered in the 1840s, and again by Leonard Rome Guthrie for Samuel Montagu, 1st Baron Swaythling around 1910. Montagu had bought the Townhill estate from Caleb William Gater, of the family of William Cator or Gater (see section on Family).

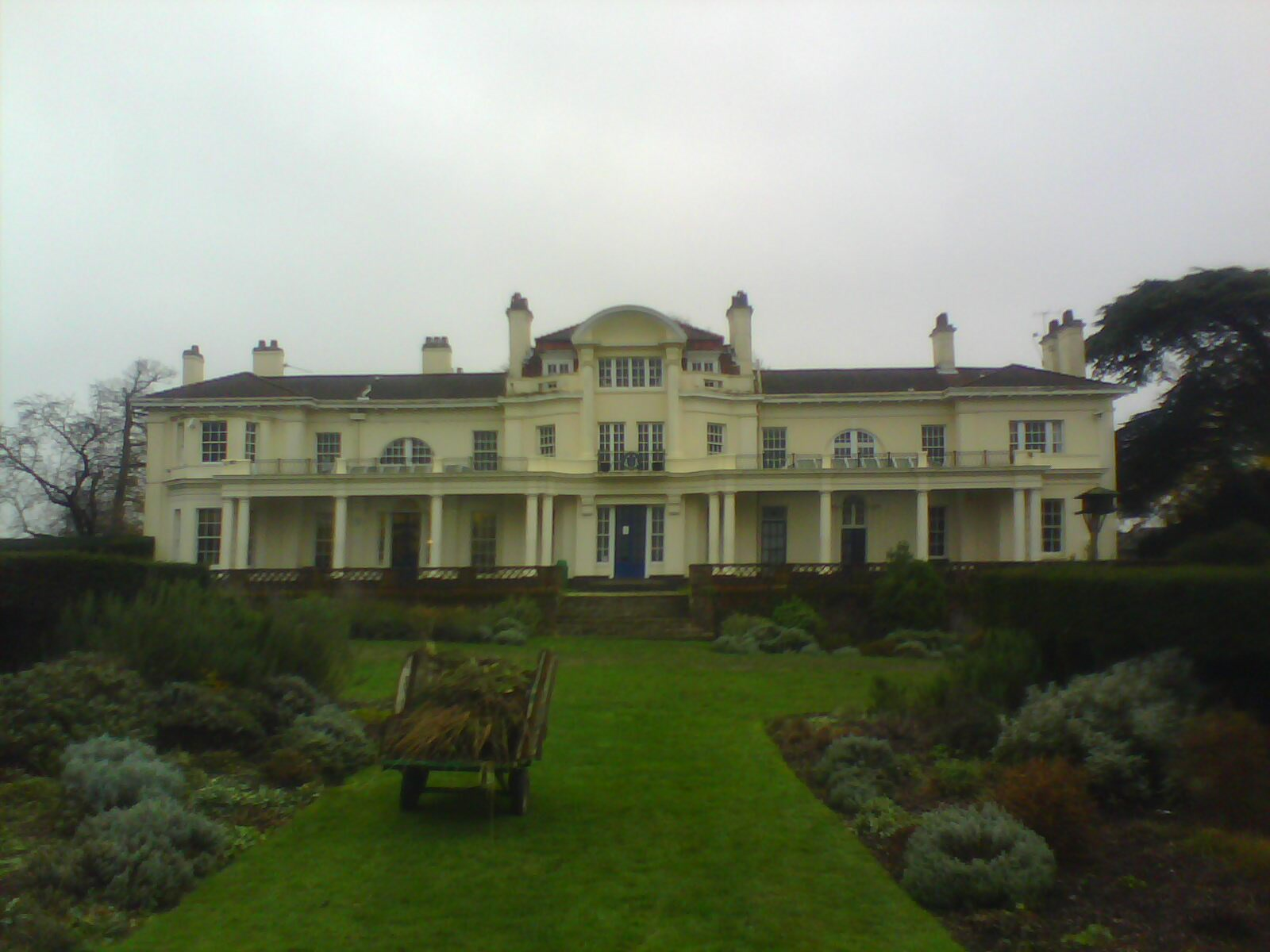
Townhill Park House in 2011

Middleton owned the manor of Allington. He was High Sheriff of Hampshire for 1800. Townhill went also under the name of Shamblehurst. Land at "Shamblehurst, or Townhill and Allington" was put up for sale in 1807, after Middleton's death.

Another land purchase by Middleton was part of Bitterne Manor. He gave it the name Midanbury. That was an Anglo-Indian allusion, mydan or midan standing for maidan, and -bury being an Old English suffix. The 19th century name for the associated mansion was Middenbury House.

== "Memory Middleton" ==
When called upon in 1788 to testify at the parliamentary proceeding against Warren Hastings, Middleton repeatedly fended off questions on events in India by replying that he couldn't remember. It gained him the sarcastic nickname "Memory Middleton", and he became a butt of satire.

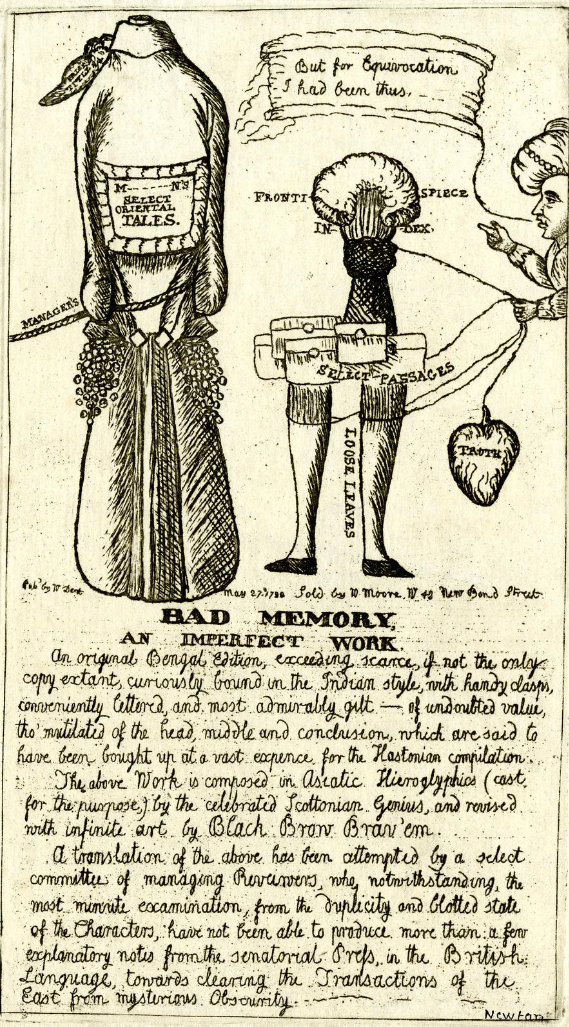
Bad Memory: An Imperfect Work, satirical print of 1788 in which Middleton, the figure on the left, has a leading rope marked "Managers"

After parliamentary consideration of the charges Hastings should face, during which Richard Brinsley Sheridan made an outstanding speech on 7 February 1787, on the "begums" charge, the trial began in Westminster Hall on 1 February 1788. On court day 18 of the trial—23 April 1788—Middleton's evidence was examined by Sheridan. A record shows Middleton repeatedly using the reply, that "he did not recollect". Viscount Stormont made a comment sympathetic with his plight. F. P. Lock considers that Middleton's extensive ducking of the questions he faced over four days, particularly on extortion of treasure by the Begum, on balance told against Hastings: it was other witnesses who helped the defence. Sheridan summed up the begum charge evidence, which turned largely on Middleton's testimony, over four separate days in early June 1788.

Edmund Burke early recognised Middleton's "powers of evasion", but with access to Middleton's correspondence, he was able in a major speech of 7 June 1794 to brand Middleton as the "active instrument" of Hastings as oppressor of Awadh. It was all to no avail, and the intermittent trial came to a close after more than seven years, with the acquittal of Hastings.

Nathaniel William Wraxall in his memoirs called Middleton a lucus a non lucendo, and alluded to the "mi non ricordo" of the trial of Queen Caroline, as employed by Theodore Majocchi.

== London banker ==
In 1793 Middleton set up a London bank with Richard Johnson who had served under him in Awadh, and others: it traded from Stratford Place, Oxford Street as the London & Middlesex Bank. The senior partner was Gerard Noel Edwards, with also George Templer and John Wedgwood. Initially Samuel Smith (1755–1793) MP was involved, who had banking connections, but his name dropped out.

As a business the bank did not prosper, and came to be dominated by Alexander Davison who bailed it out in 1803. It required large capital injections from Middleton at the end of his life. Its affairs were left in a disordered state on his death in 1807, not helped by his will not coming to light for nine years. Further support came from Josiah Wedgwood, father of John, and Charles Middleton, 1st Baron Barham, but the bank was wound up in 1816. Johnson's speculations have been blamed for this ultimate failure. Templer lost heavily, and had to return in 1818 to India, dying in 1819.

== Family ==
Middleton married in 1780 Ann(e) Frances Morse (1758–1823), daughter of John Morse (died 1781), an eminent West Indies merchant and slave-owner in Jamaica. They had 10 children together; Middleton also had three children in India outside marriage. Anne was of mixed race, being one John Morse's five children with Elizabeth Augier, a Jamaican of colour.

A week after Anne was wed, her sister Sarah married William Cator, a business associate of her brother Robert who was in Bengal as a lawyer. Cator bought Townhill, where Nathaniel Middleton had built a house, in 1799. Cator was later killed on the Indiaman Kent in 1800, off Bengal, in an attack by the privateer Robert Surcouf, as is recorded in the memoirs of William Hickey, a friend of Robert Morse. From John Morse Anne inherited a 20% share in some Jamaican plantations; these are thought to have been assigned to her nephew the merchant Robert Green, son of her sister Catherine (not in India), and brother of Edmund Francis Green, a major planter and slave-holder.

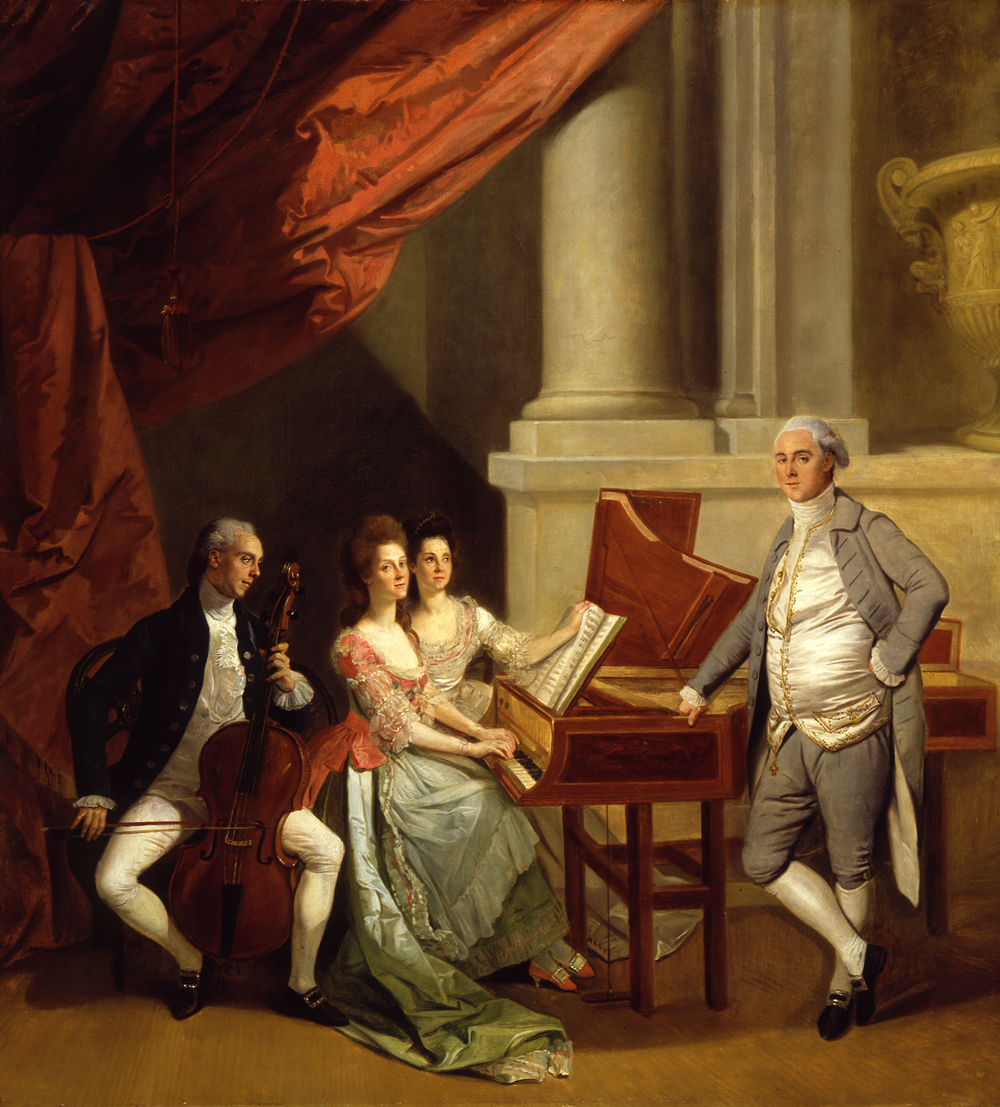
Group portrait by Johann Zoffany, The Morse and Cator Family from the 1780s, depicting from left to right Robert Morse, Anne Middleton and Sarah Cator at the piano, William Cator

The bank's troubles meant that family property was disposed of to creditors. Around 1816, when the bank folded, Anne who was living in Bath, Somerset with her widowed sister Sarah, began suffering from mental illness.

=== Children ===
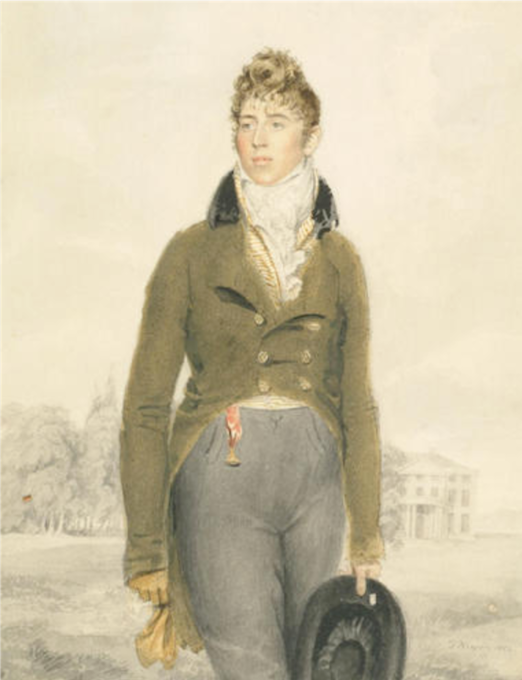
Hastings Nathaniel Middleton, 1802 watercolour by Thomas Heaphy

The eldest son of Nathaniel and Anne Middleton was Hastings Nathaniel Middleton, who after his father's death in 1807 became a partner in the family bank, by then known as Alexander Davison & Co. Hastings married Emily Purling, daughter of Charles Purling of the East India Company, went to live in Tunbridge Wells in reduced circumstances, and died in 1821, leaving an eldest son (c.1810–1898) of the same name who became a barrister. Emily's brother John Charles Purling married Harriet Anne, sister of Hastings, in 1806.

Another son was William (baptised in Calcutta 1783, died 1822 in Kamptee), who became a major in the 16th Native Infantry. Henry Johnson Middleton (baptised 1791) was a younger son. He studied at the East India College and joined the Bengal civil service. He married in 1816 Mary Anne Ochterlony, daughter of Sir David Ochterlony, at Patna. He died in Bath in 1866.

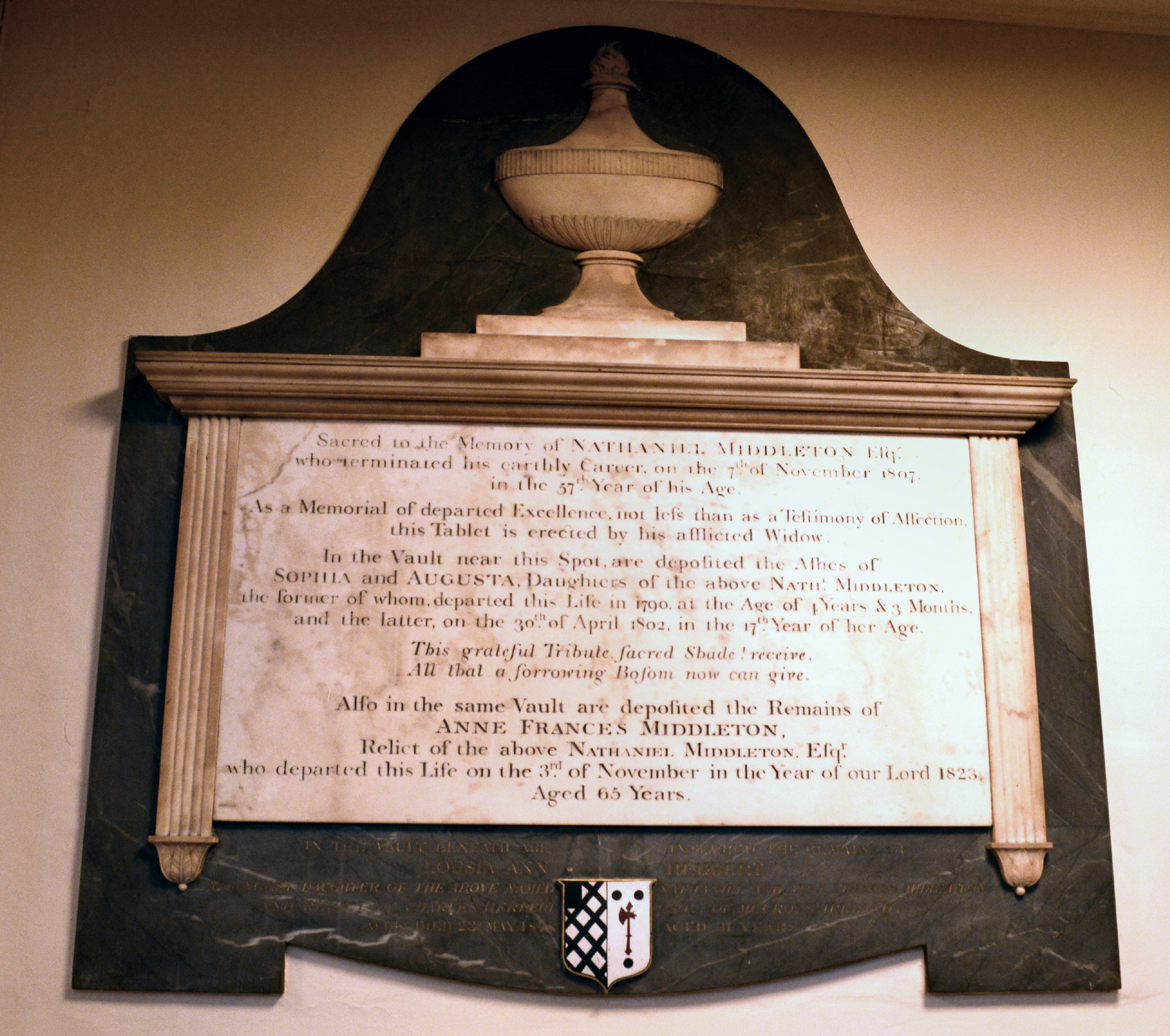
Memorial in St. Mary's Church, Battersea

Other daughters included:

- Emily, who married in 1804 Edward Jerningham, the younger son of Sir William Jerningham, 6th Baronet and was the grandmother of Hubert Jerningham, Governor of Mauritius, then Governor of Trinidad and Tobago.
- Louisa, who married Charles John Herbert of Muckross House, and was mother of Henry Arthur Herbert, MP and Jane Hedges-White, Countess of Bantry.

A grave in Dacca recorded the death at age 13 months of Frances Anne Middleton, on 30 October 1784.
