= History of Faizabad =

- City
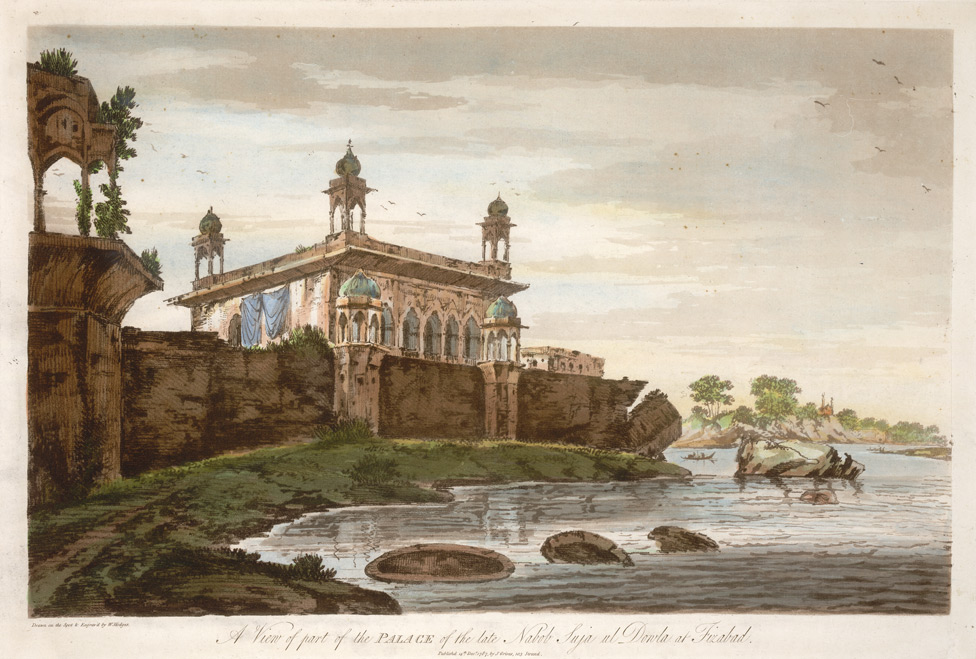
- Depiction of Faizabad Fort by William Hodges, 1787.

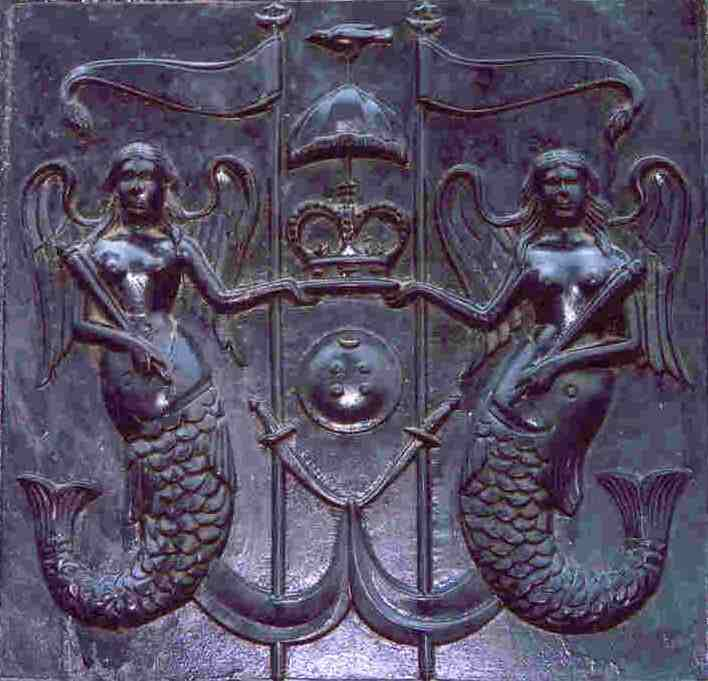
- Flag Seal

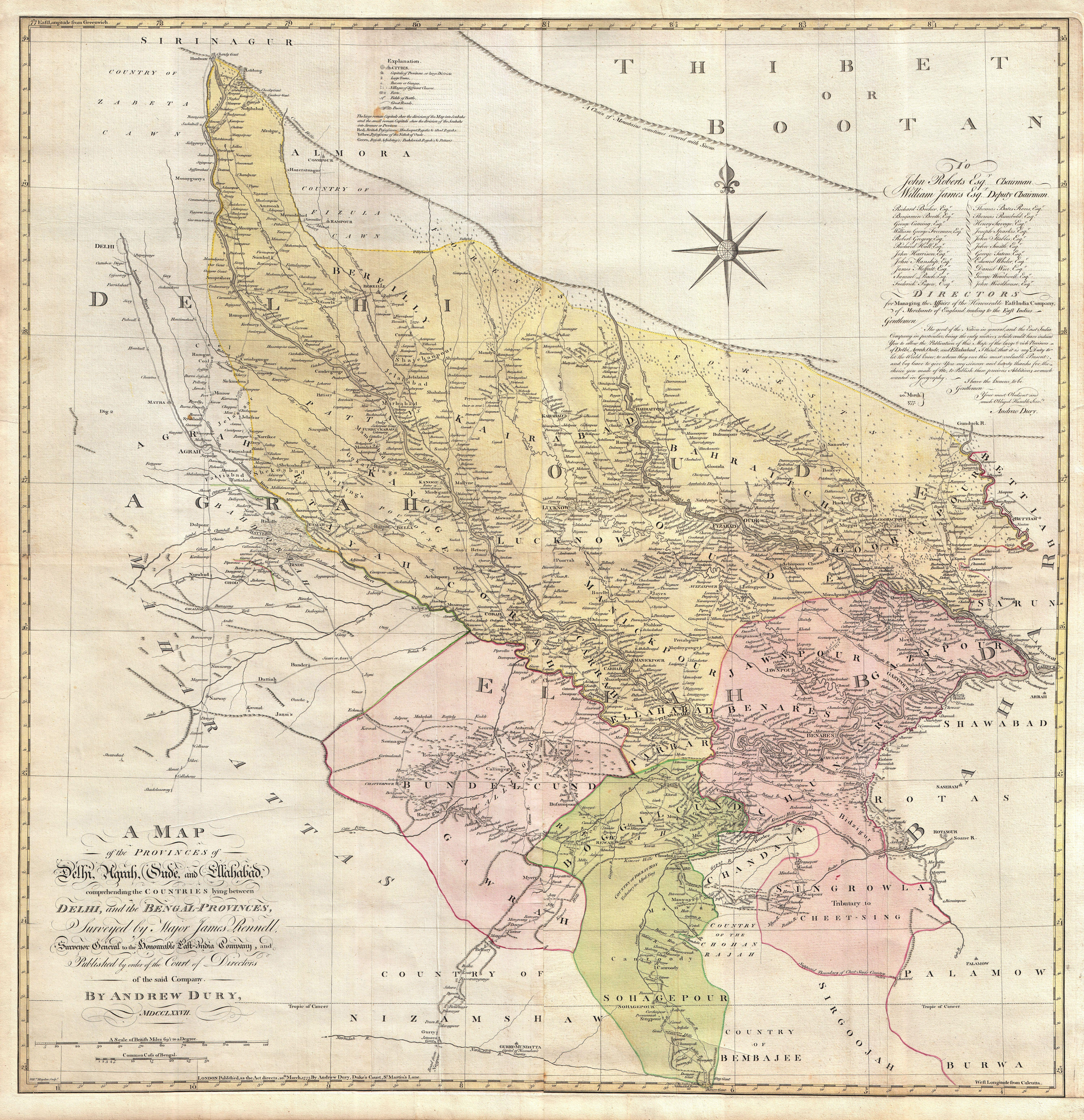
- Dury Wall Map of Delhi, Agra and Oudh
- Country: India
- State: Awadh
- Founder: Faiz Bakhsh and later by Nawab Sadat Khan and his successors as capital city
- Seat: Fyzabad

Government
  - Nawabs (Governor): Saadat Ali Khan I, Safdarjung, Shujauddaula and Asafuddaula.

Local tradition holds Fyzabad or now Faizabad is identical with Saketa of the Ramayana, supposedly the private estate of King Dasharatha, the father of Rama. It is claimed that Saket was renamed after the death of Faiz Baksh, a courtier of the Nawab of Awadh. Historically, when Nawab Saadat Ali Khan, Burhan-ul-Mulk was given the charge of the Subah of Awadh around 1722 by the Mughal court, he settled on the banks of the river Ghaghara, building a fortress and mud barracks. Due to these temporary dwellings, the settlement was initially referred to as 'Bangla' (implied meaning- hutment).

== Princely State of Avadh ==
Avadh was established around 1722 with Faizabad as its capital and Saadat Ali Khan I as first Nawab and progenitor of Nawabs of Awadh. He made his own palace near Ayodhya, and founded a new city Faizabad, which became the capital of the new government. Due to his management policy state's income rose from 7 million to 20 million rupees.

== The 1st Nawab Saadat Ali Khan I ==
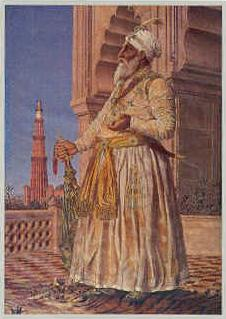
Saadat Ali Khan, the first and powerful Nawab, who laid the foundation of Faizabad as capital city.

Sa'adat Khan was born Muhammad Amin Musawi the son of Muhammad Nasir Musawi a merchant of Khurasan. (Note: An oriental biographical dictionary: founded on materials collected by the late Thomas William Beale;2nd Edition; Publisher:W.H. Allen, 1894; page 337) His grandfather a wealthy merchant migrated to India during the reign of the Mughal Emperor Shah Jahan. Saadat Ali Khan I's father became a very prominent official during the rule of Bahadur Shah I. He is the progenitor of the Nawabs of Awadh.

Nawab Saadat Ali Khan, was given the charge of the Subah of Awadh around 1722 by the Mughal Court. Nawab Saadat Ali Khan made the first settlements along the banks of Ghaghra river with a cantonment consisting of a fortress and mud barracks.

Awadh under him included five districts Khalilabad, Faizabad, Gorakhpur, Bahraich and Lucknow. Boundaries of Oudh stretched to Himalayan hills in north, Bihar in east, in south unto Kara-Manikpur of Allahabad province and in west unto Kannauj. From Gorakhpur to Kannauj 270 miles long and from northern hills to Kara-Manikpur the province was 230 miles wide, totalling to 10,171,080 Bigha in area.

Local kings, zamindars and jagirdars have created mismanagement and destroyed the peace of the area since the reign of Aurangzeb, specially the Sheikh Zadas. Sadat Khan tamed them, made his own palace near Ayodhya, and founded a new city Faizabad, which became the capital of the new government. Due to his management policy state's income rose from 7 million to 20 million rupees. Muhammad Shah was very pleased with his service and gave him the title of "Burhan-ul-Mulk".

Sa'adat Khan enlarged the state boundary on eastern front by taking Banaras, Jaunpur, Ghazipur and Chunar under his control from Jagirdar Murtaza Khan in 1728.

He was one of the commanding Mughal generals in the Battle of Karnal against Nadir Shah. Sa'adat Khan was captured during the battle and died on the night prior to the massacre of Delhi by Nadir Shah on 19 March 1739. He was buried at Delhi in the mausoleum of his brother Sayadat Khan.

=== Issue and successor ===
His only child was a daughter who was married to his nephew Muhammad Muqim better known as Abul Mansur Khan Safdar Jung the son of Sayadat Khan who succeeded him in the government of Awadh.

== The 2nd Nawab Safdarjung ==
Faizabad developed further during the reign of Nawab Safdarjung, the second nawab of Avadh (1739–54), who made it the military headquarters while his successor Nawab Shuja-ud-daula developed it as full-fledged capital city.

== The 3rd Nawab Shujauddaula ==
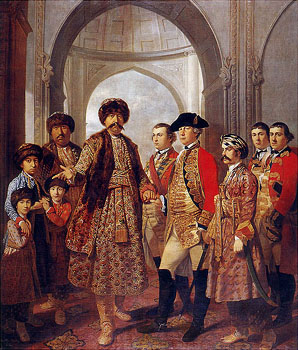
Shuja-ud-Daula the Nawab of Awadh, with Four Sons, General Barker and other Military Officers.

Faizabad was developed later on by Nawab Safdarjung's successor, Nawab Shujauddaula into a full-fledged capital city, with gardens, palaces, markets, roads and other infrastructure. Under Shuja-ud-Daula's reign Faizabad achieved its culmination as an important centre of trade and commerce in northern India and attracted travellers, writers, merchants, artists and courtesans from sll over Europe and Asia. Shuja-ud-Daula also built a fortress on the banks of Saryu after he lost the battle of Buxar in 1764. however, this fort now is nothing more than a hummock.Suja-ud-daula, the third Nawab of Awadh, built a fort known as Chhota Calcutta, now in ruins. In 1765 he built the Chowk and Tirpaulia and subsequently laid out the Anguribagh and Motibagh to the south of it, Asafbagh and Bulandbagh to the west of the city. During the reign of Shuja-Ud-Daula, Faizabad attained such a prosperity which it never saw again. The Nawabs graced Faziabad with several beautiful buildings, notable among them being the Gulab Bari, Moti Mahal and the tomb of Bahu Begum. Gulab Bari is a striking building of fine properties, standing in a garden surrounded by a wall, approachable through two large gateways. These buildings are particularly interesting for their assimilative architectural styles. Shuja-ud-daula's wife was the well known Bahu Begum, who married the Nawab in 1743 and continued to reside in Faizabad, her residence being the Moti-Mahal. Close by at Jawaharbagh lies her Maqbara, where she was buried after her death in 1816. It is considered to be one of the finest buildings of its kind in Avadh, which was built at the cost of 300,000 rupees by her chief advisor Darab Ali Khan. A fine view of the city is obtainable from top of the Begum's tomb. Bahu Begum was a woman of great distinction and rank, bearing dignity. Most of the Muslim buildings of Faizabad are attributed to her. From the date of Bahu Begum's death in 1815 till the annexation of Avadh, the city of Faizabad gradually fell into decay. The glory of Faizabad finally eclipsed with the shifting of capital from Faizabad to Lucknow by Nawab Asaf-ud-daula.

== The 4th Nawab Asaf-ud-Daula ==
Nawab Asaf-ud-Daula, son of Nawab Shujauddaula, was the fourth Nawab of Avadh. He shifted the capital from Faizabad to Lucknow this led to decline of rapidly growing Faizabad but glory to Lucknow. It is said that due to interference in the regime by his mother after the death of his father Nawab Shujauddaula he compelled to move from Faizabad to Lucknow.

=== Move of capital From Faizabad to Lucknow ===
Asaf-ud-Daula, the fourth Nawab and son of Shuja-ud-Daula, moved the capital from Faizabad to Lucknow in 1775. His rule saw the building of the Asafi Imambara and Rumi Darwaza, built by Raja Tikait Rai Nawab Wazir (Diwan) of Awadh, which till date are the biggest architectural marvels in the city. Asaf-ud-Daula made Lucknow one of the most prosperous and glittering cities in all India. It is said, he moved because he wanted to get away from the control of a dominant mother. On such a thread did the fate of the great city of Lucknow depend. From the date of Bahu Begum's death in 1815 till the annexation of Avadh, the city of Faizabad gradually fell into decay. The glory of Faizabad finally eclipsed with the shifting of capital from Faizabad to Lucknow by Nawab Asaf-ud-daula.

== 3rd Battle of Panipat (1761) ==
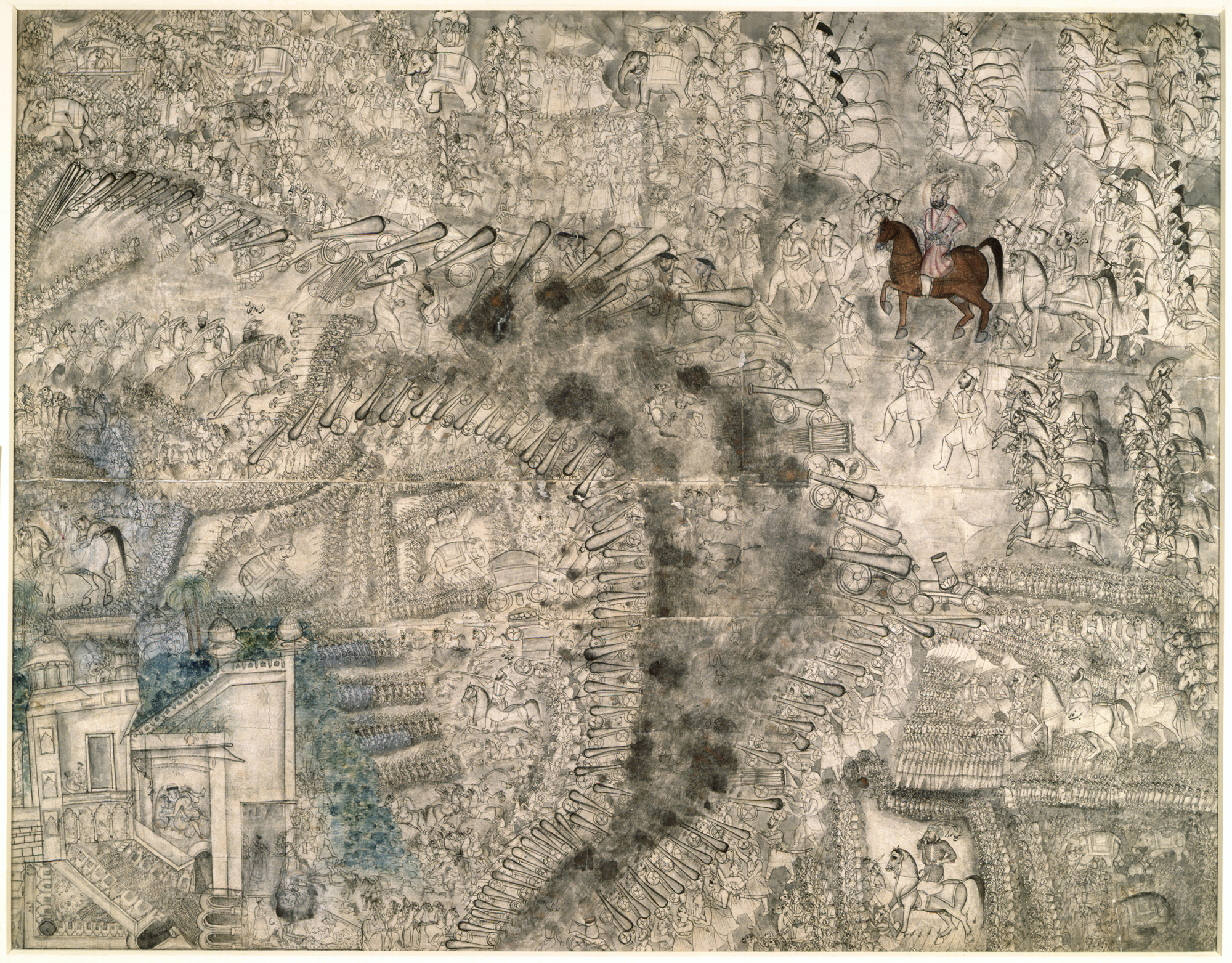
The Third battle of Panipat 13 January 1761

Third battle of Panipat was fought between Maratha Empire and coalition forces. Shujauddaula was one of the commander/leader of coalition forces.

Faizabad was also a centre of one of many battles of the Mutiny of 1857. A detailed history of Faizabad can be read in 'Tareekh-e-Farahbaksh', written by Munshi Mohd. Faiz Baksh, (after whom Faizabad is named) a courtier in the Shuja-ud-Daula's court. This book has been translated into English by Hamid Afaq Qureshi as 'Memoirs of Faizabad'. Faizabad also finds a prominent and detailed mention in Guzashta Lucknow written by Abdul Halim Sharar. The fourth nawab of Awadh, Nawab Asaf-ud-Daula, shifted the Capital of Avadh to Lucknow in 1775 after his terms with his mother became sour.

== Nawabs of Awadh with Faizabad as capital ==
Portrait	Titular Name	Personal Name	Birth	Reign	Death
	Burhan ul Mulk Sa'adat Khan برہان الملک سعادت خان	Mir Muhammad Amin Musawi	1680	1722–1739	1739
	Abul-Mansur Khan Safdar Jung ابو المنصور خان صفدرجنگ	Muhammad Muqim	1708	1737–1753	1754
	Shuja-ud-Daula شجاع الدولہ	Jalal-ud-din Haider Abul-Mansur Khan	1732	1753–1775	1775
	Asaf-ud-Daula آصف الدولہ	Muhammad Yahya Mirza Amani	1748	1775–1797	1797

== Gallery ==
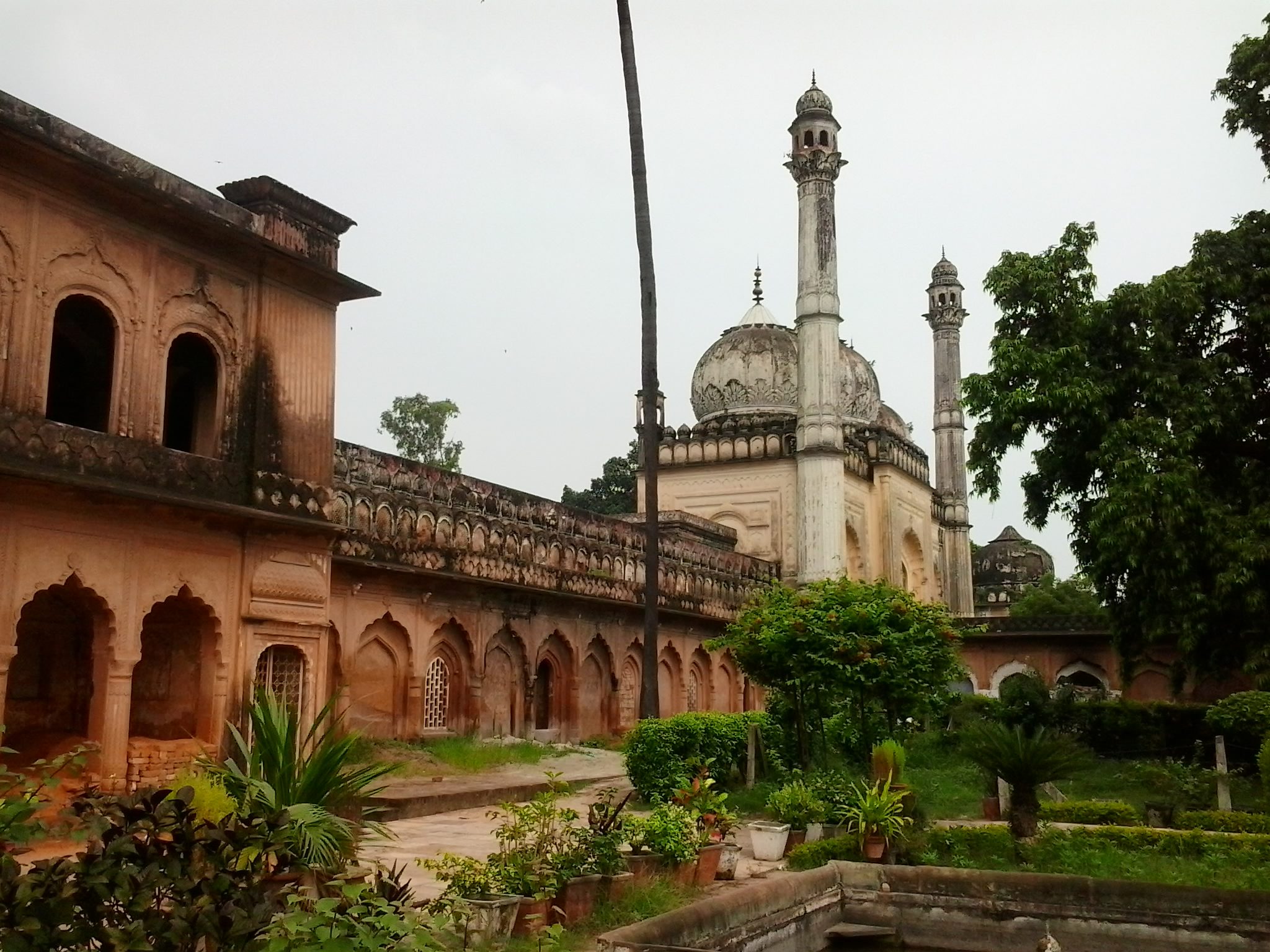

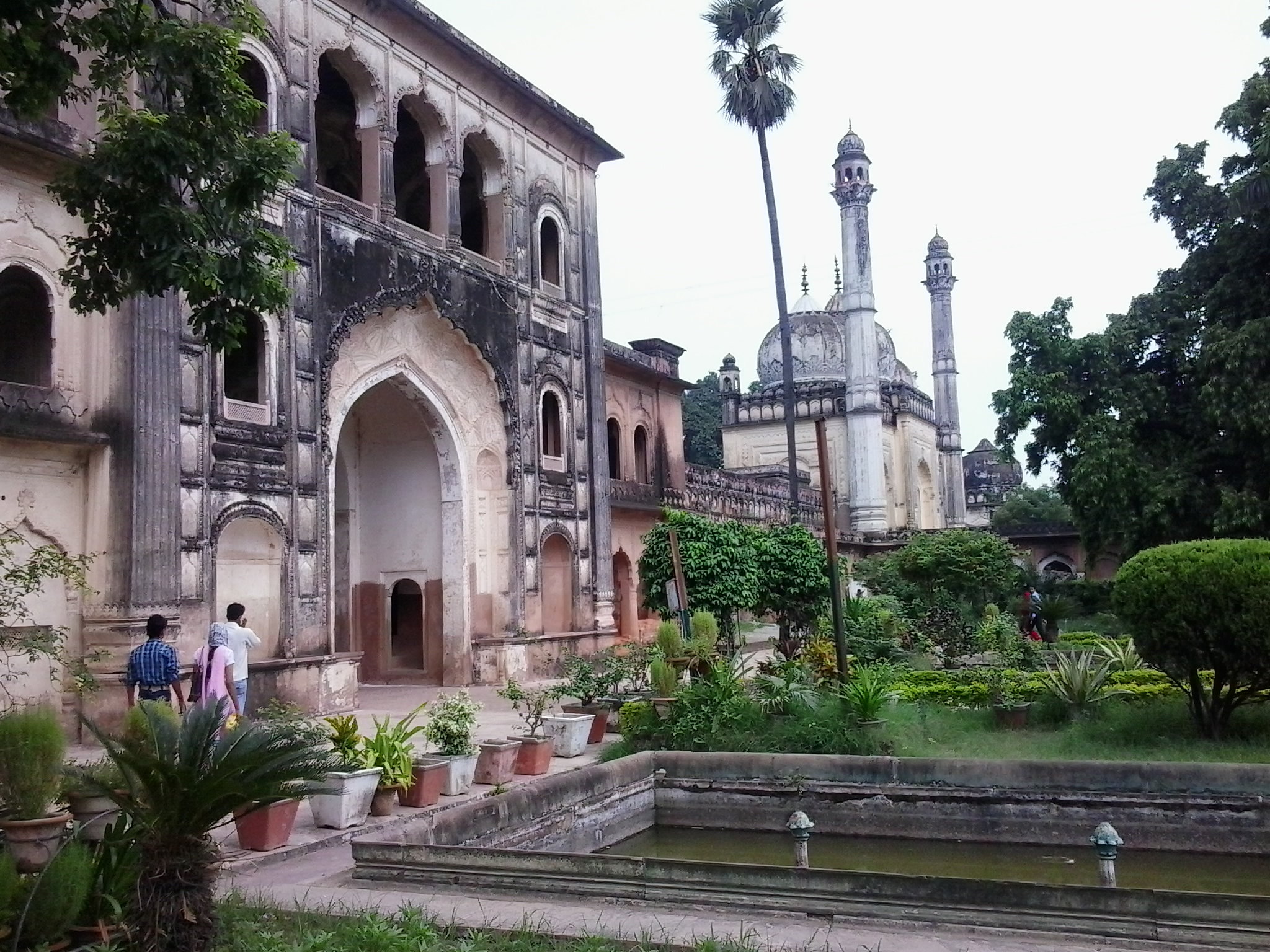

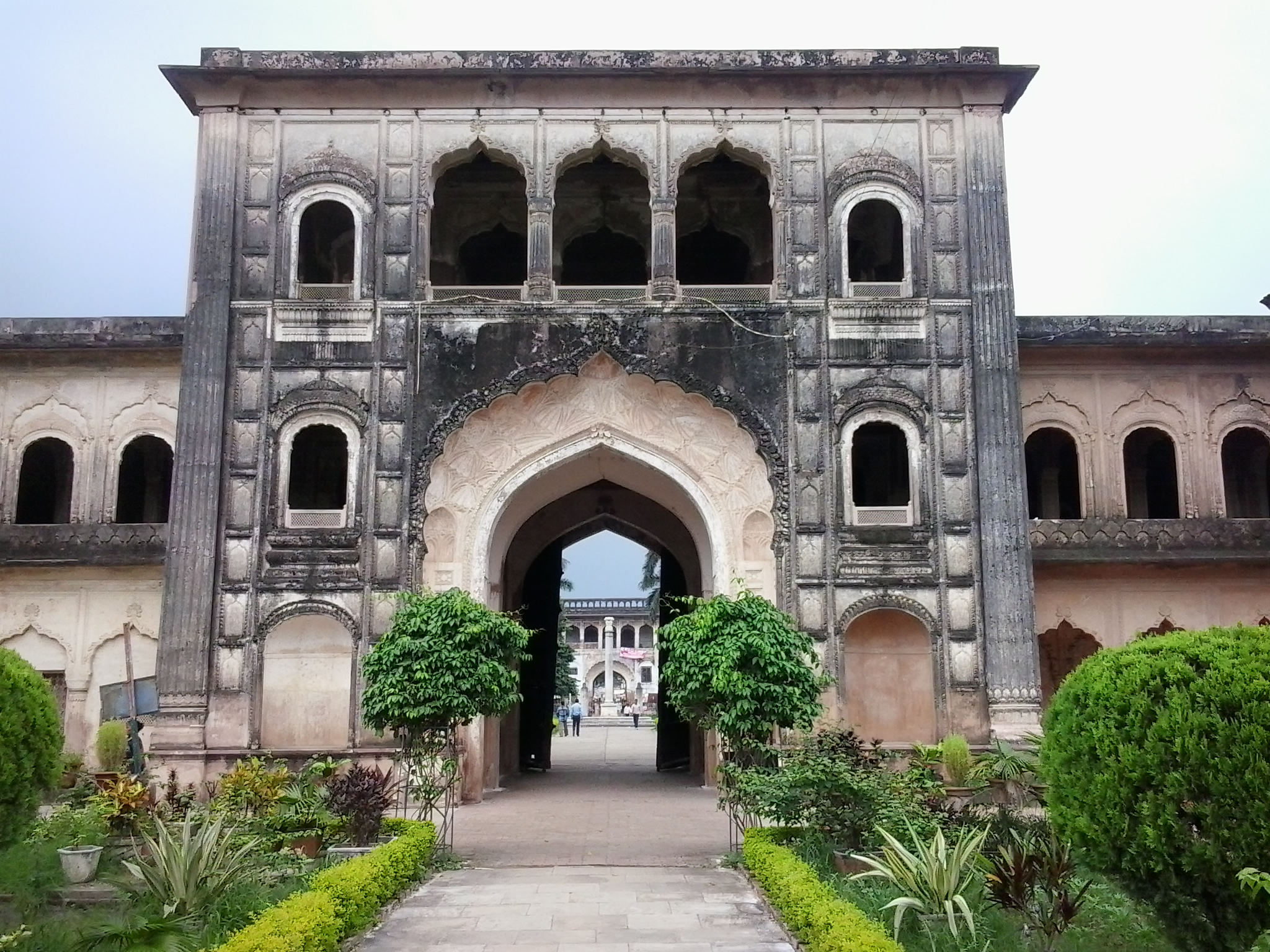

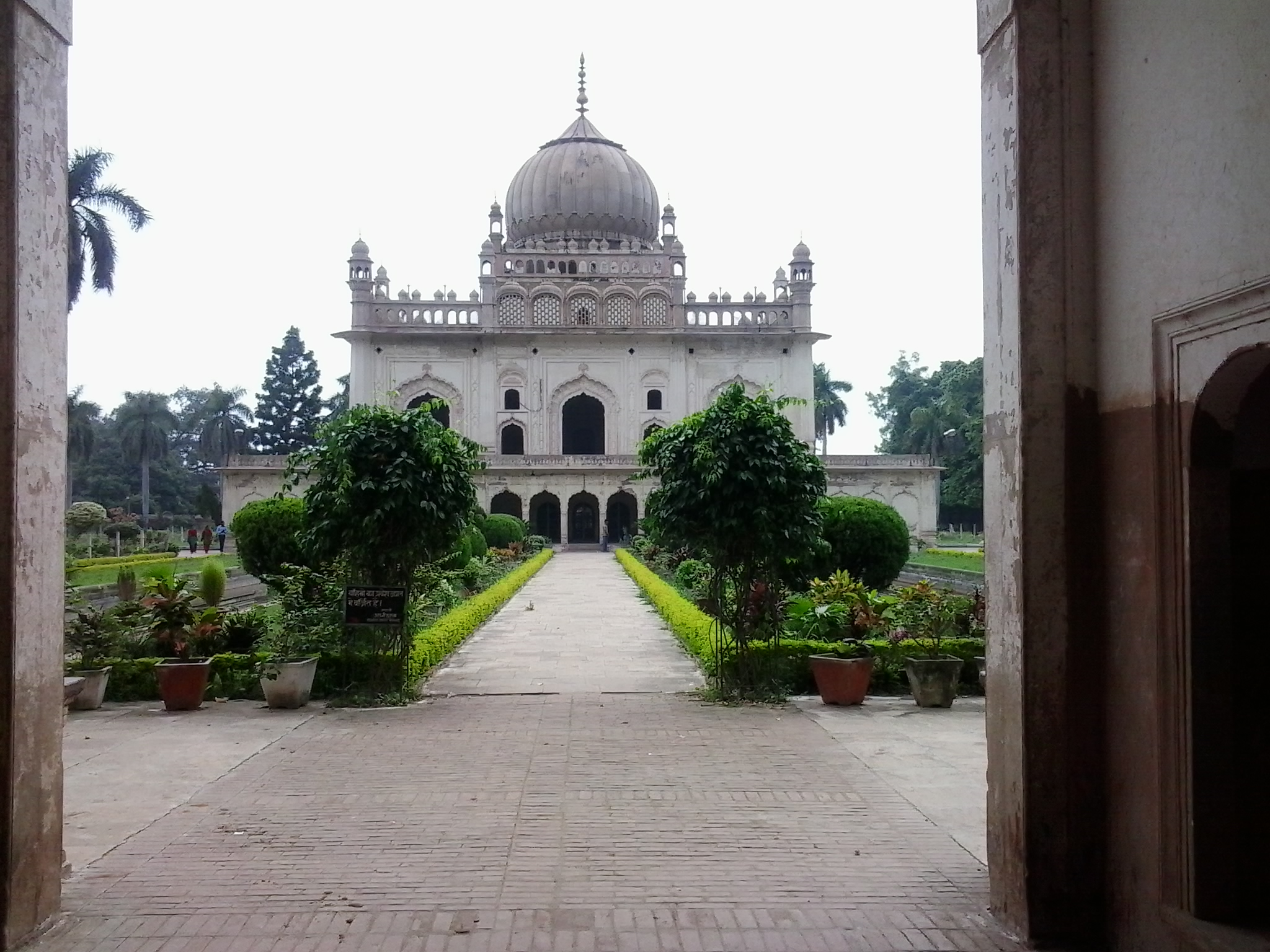

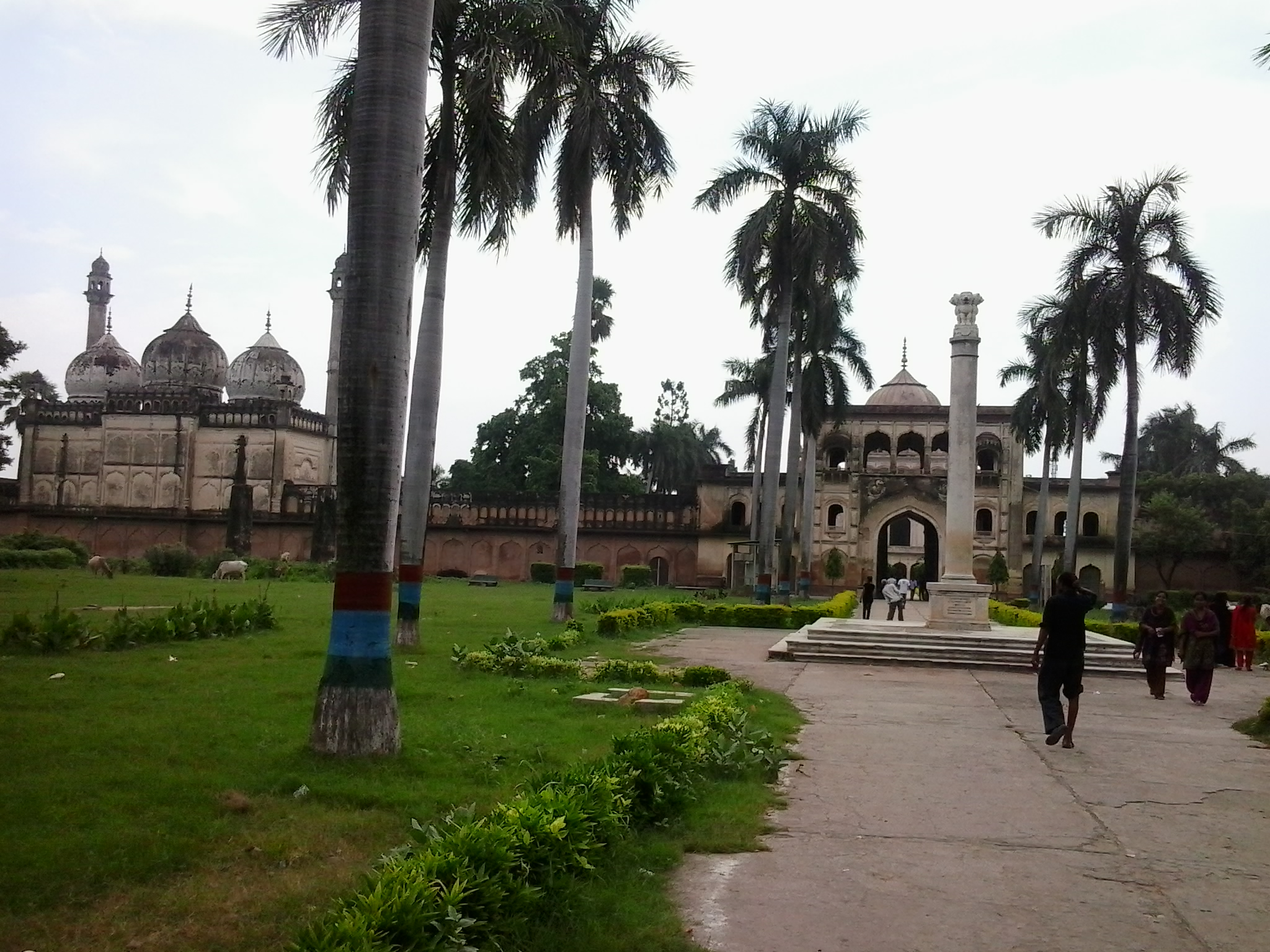

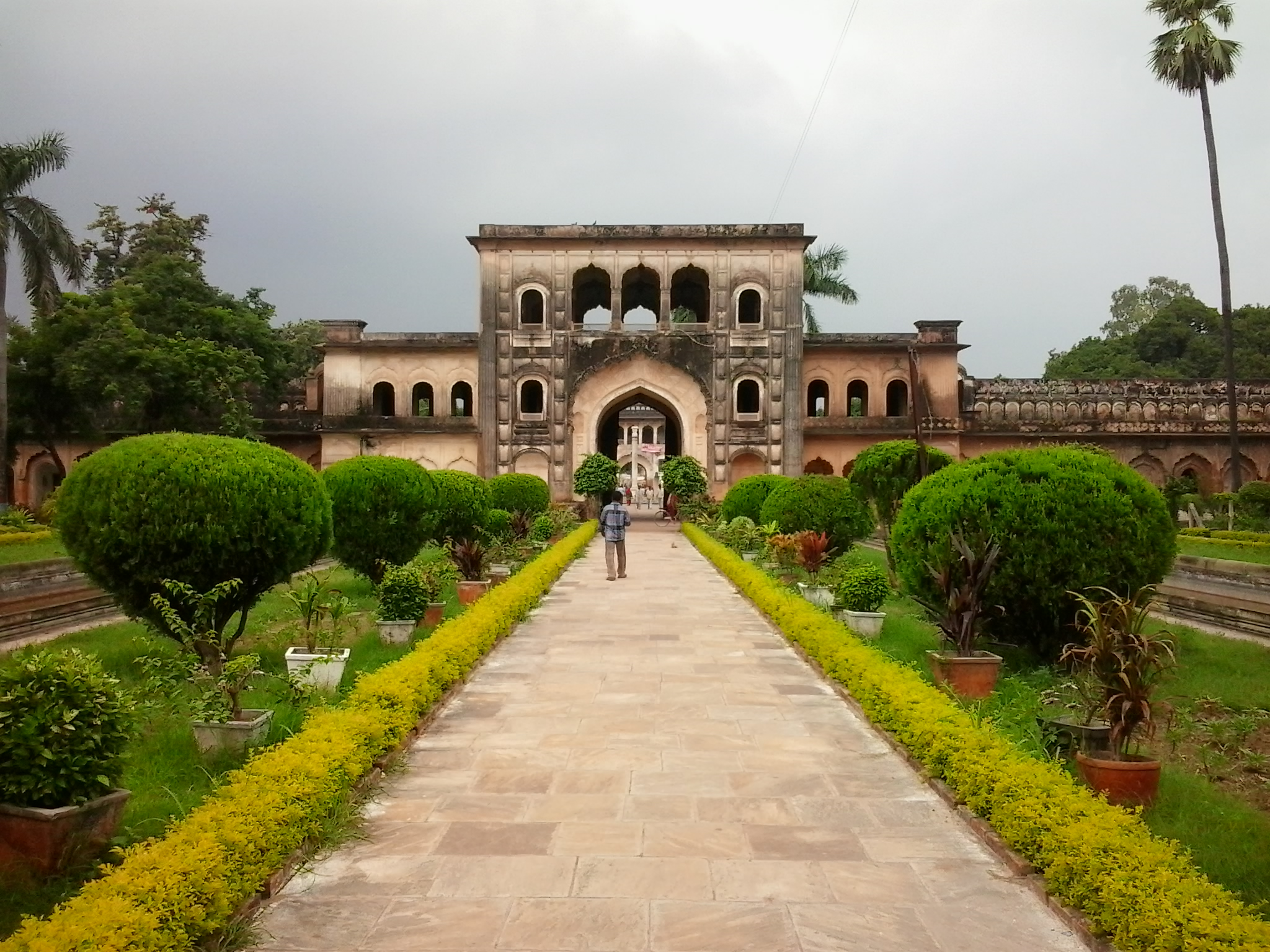

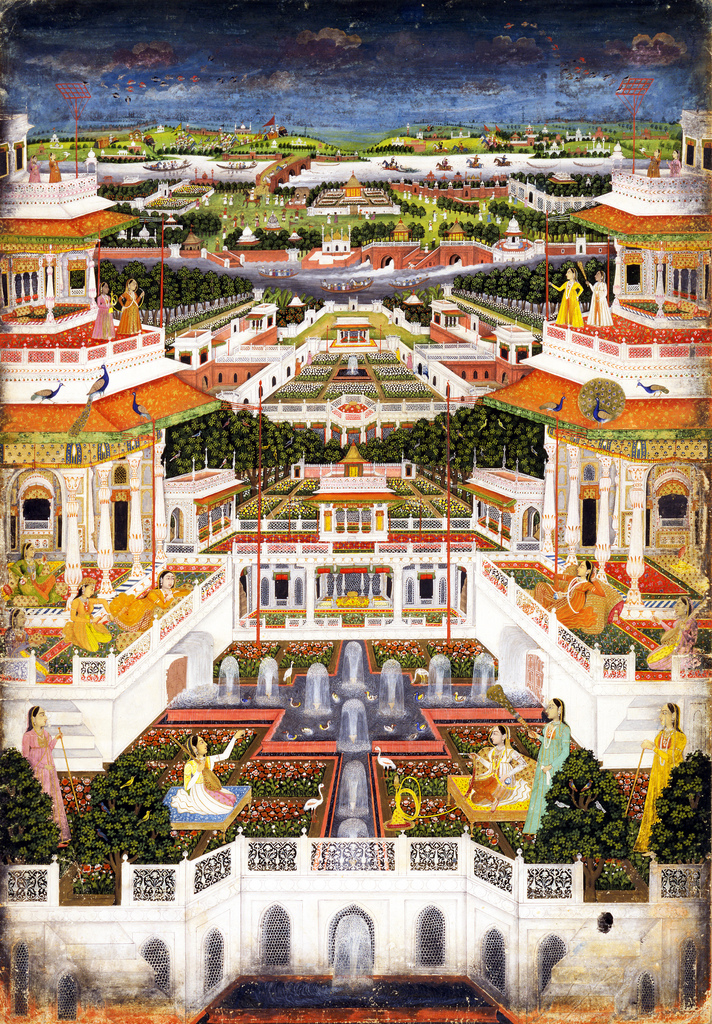
A Palace Complex with Harem Gardens India, Faizabad, c. 1765

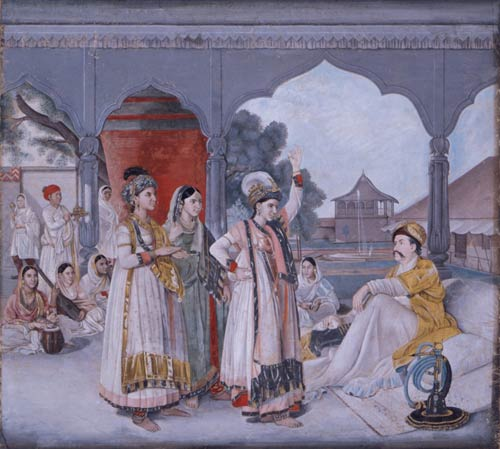
watching a nautch, after a painting by Johann Zoffany, circa 1786–88

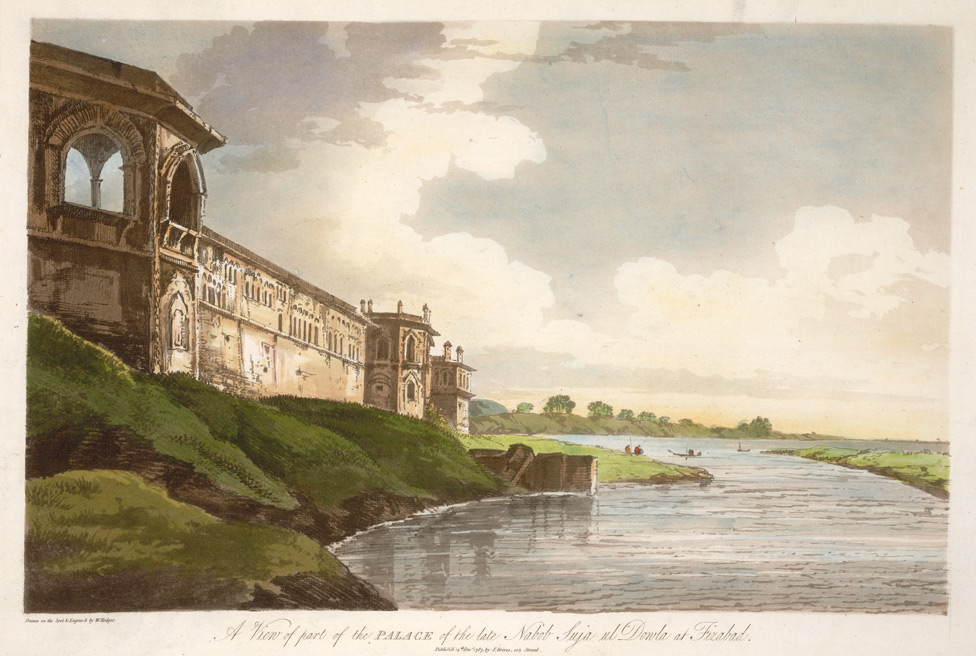
Depiction of The fort, now ruined, was built by Shujaudaula of Faizabad Hodges, William (1744–1797).

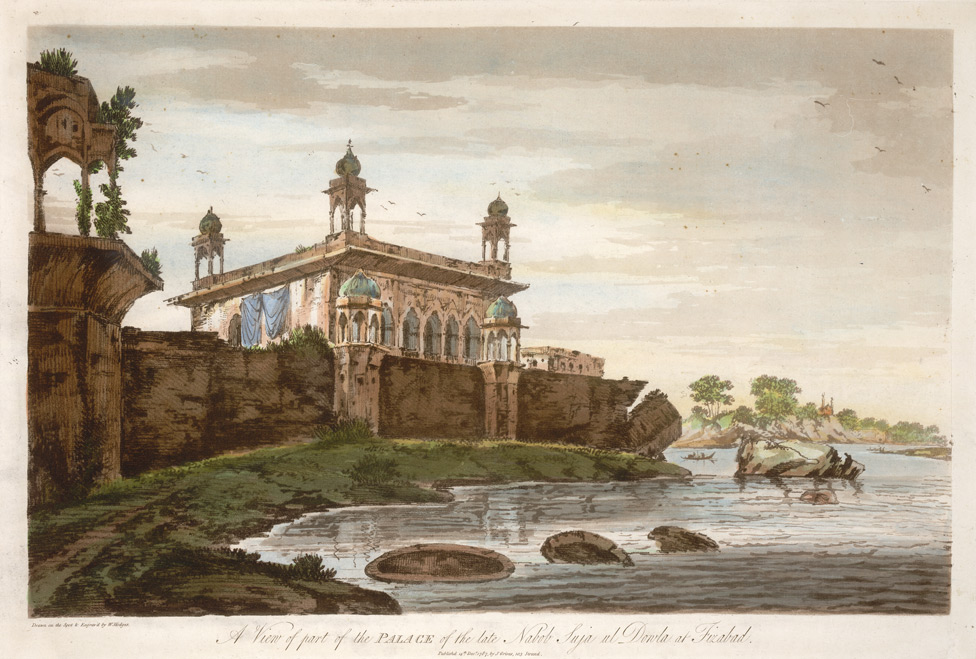
Depiction of Faizabad Fort by William Hodges, 1787.

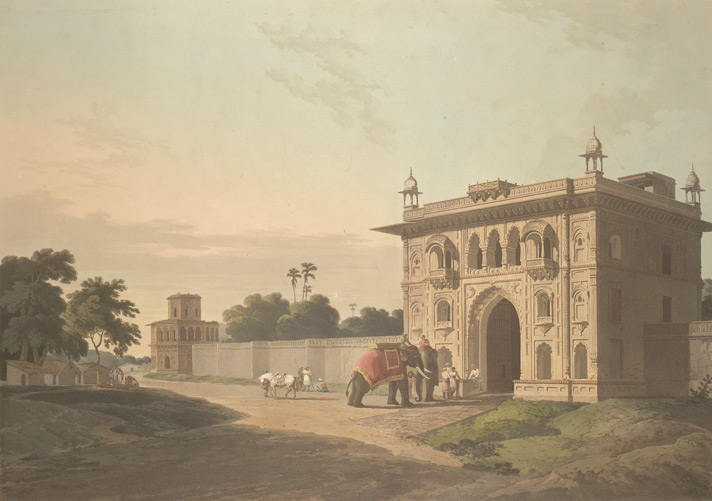
Gate of the Loll-Baug at Fyzabad; by Thomas and William Daniell, 1801* (BL).

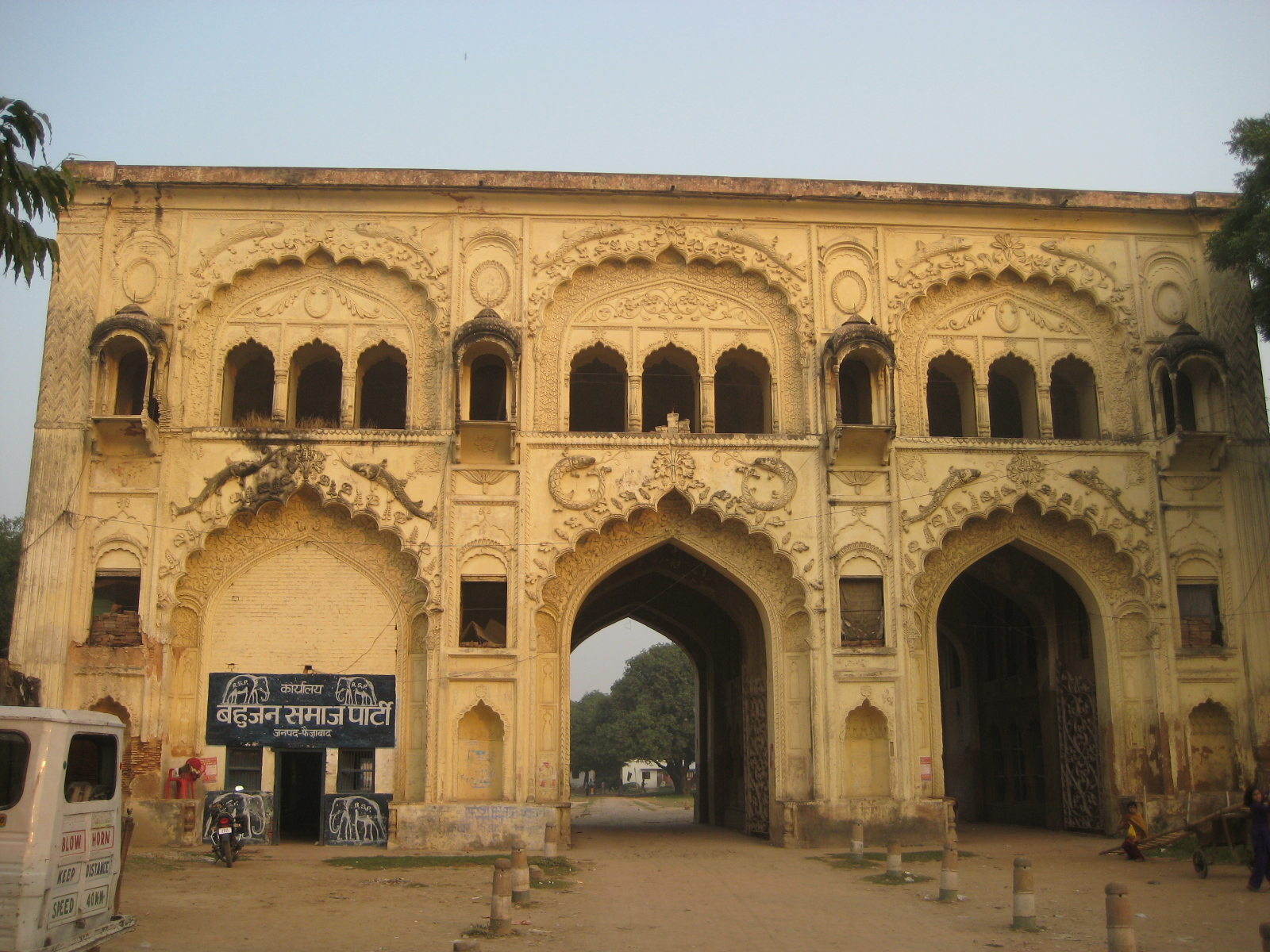
Entrance to Bahu Begum ka Maqbara.

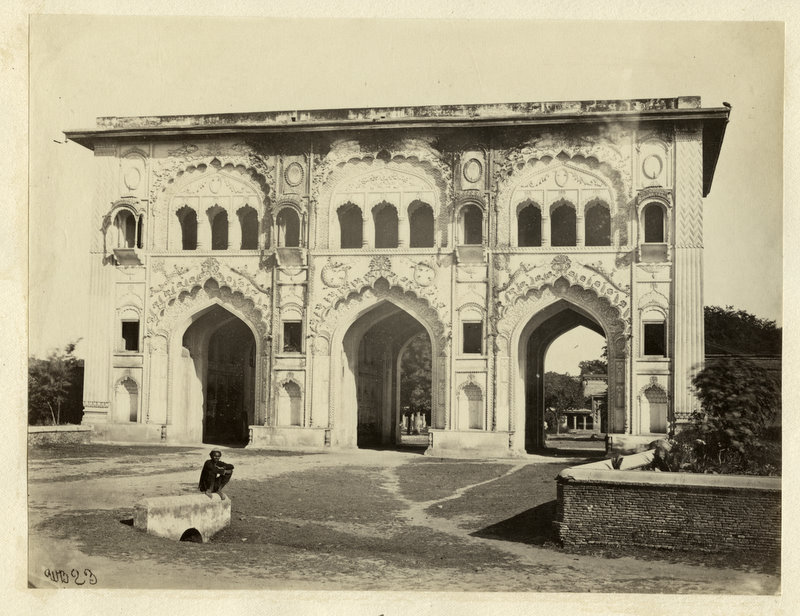
"Gateway, Faizabad," a photo, c. 1880s.

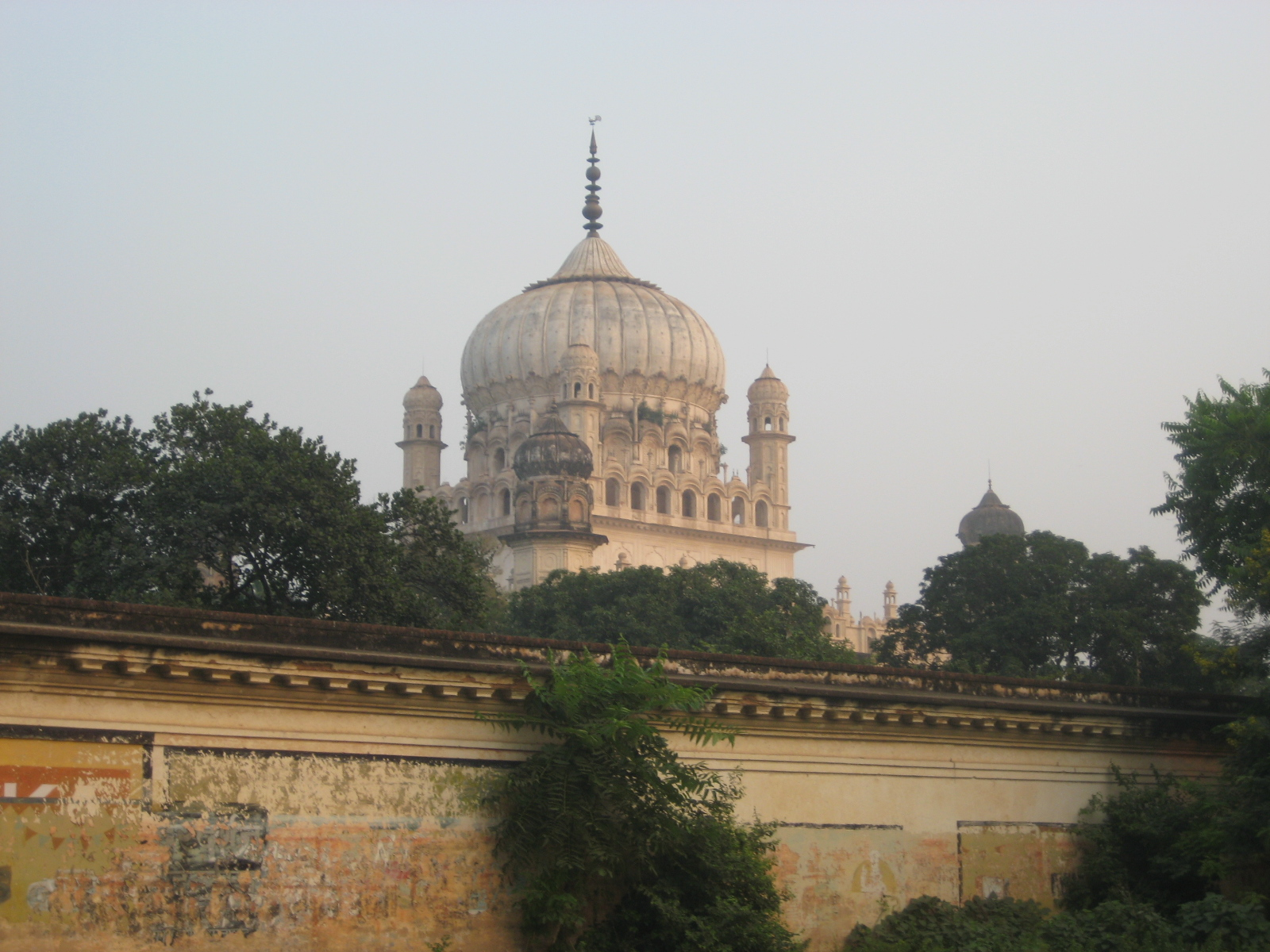
another view of Maqbara

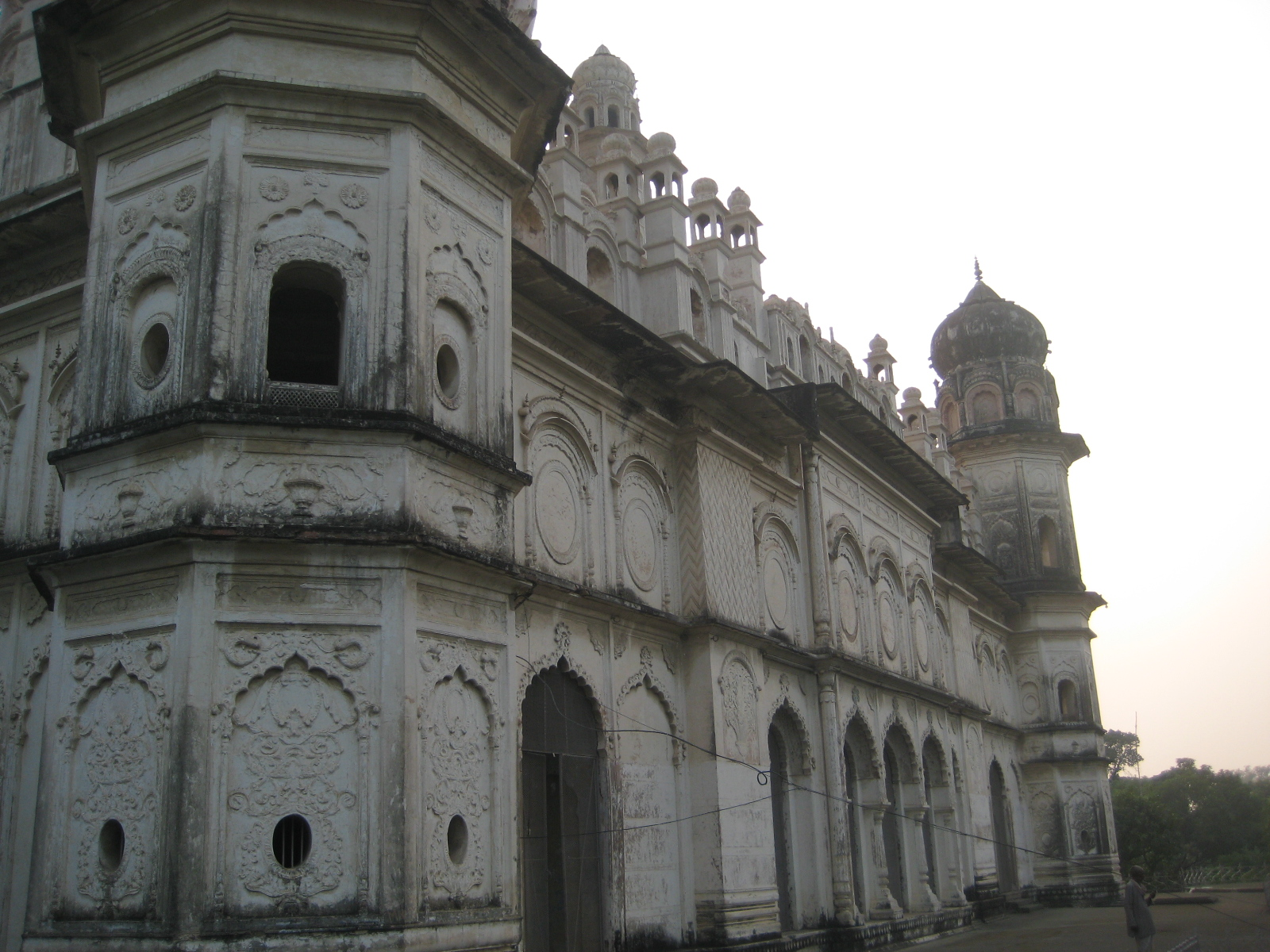
Ramparts of Maqbara

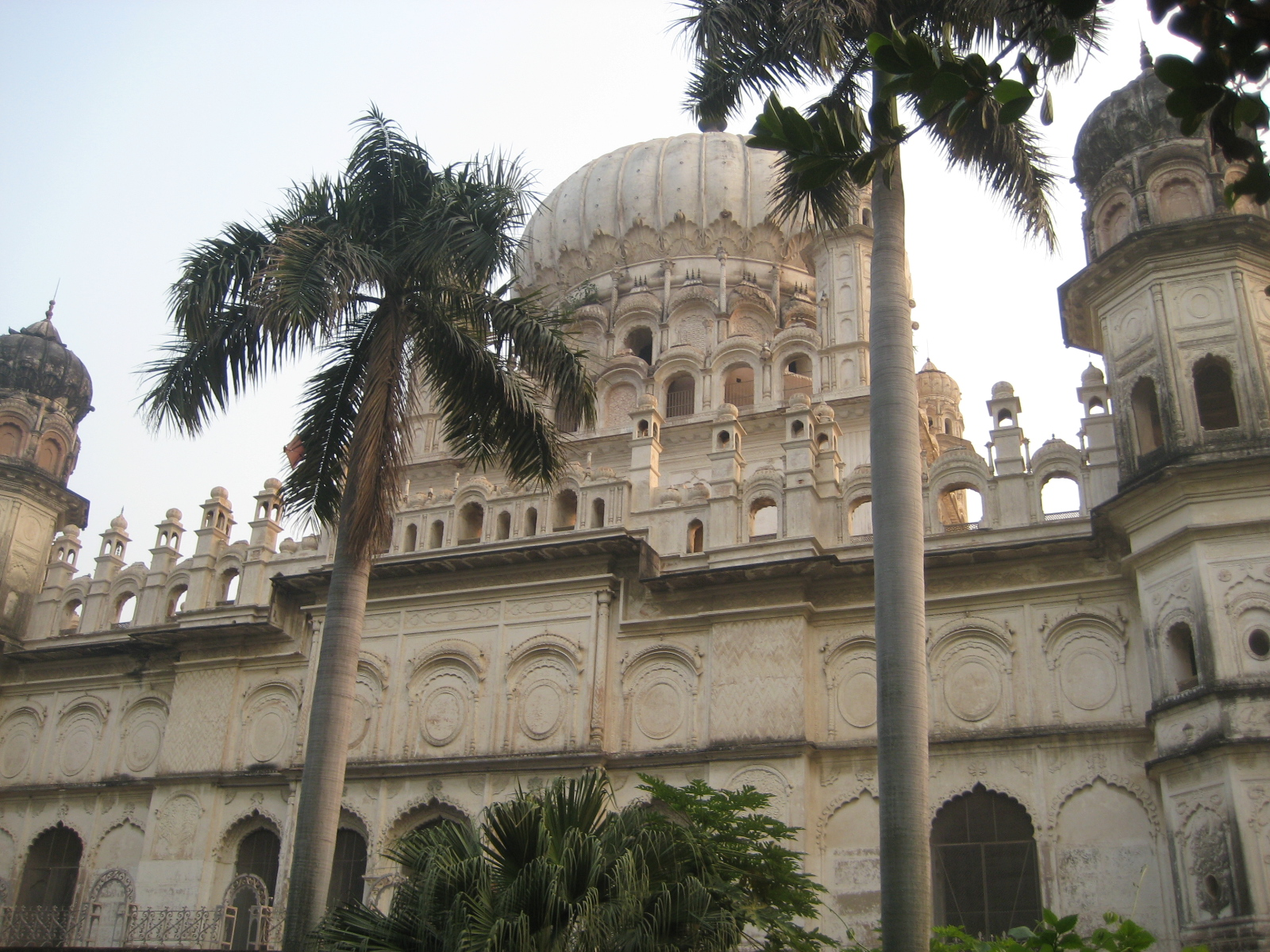
The main entrance way of Maqbara is lined with palm trees.

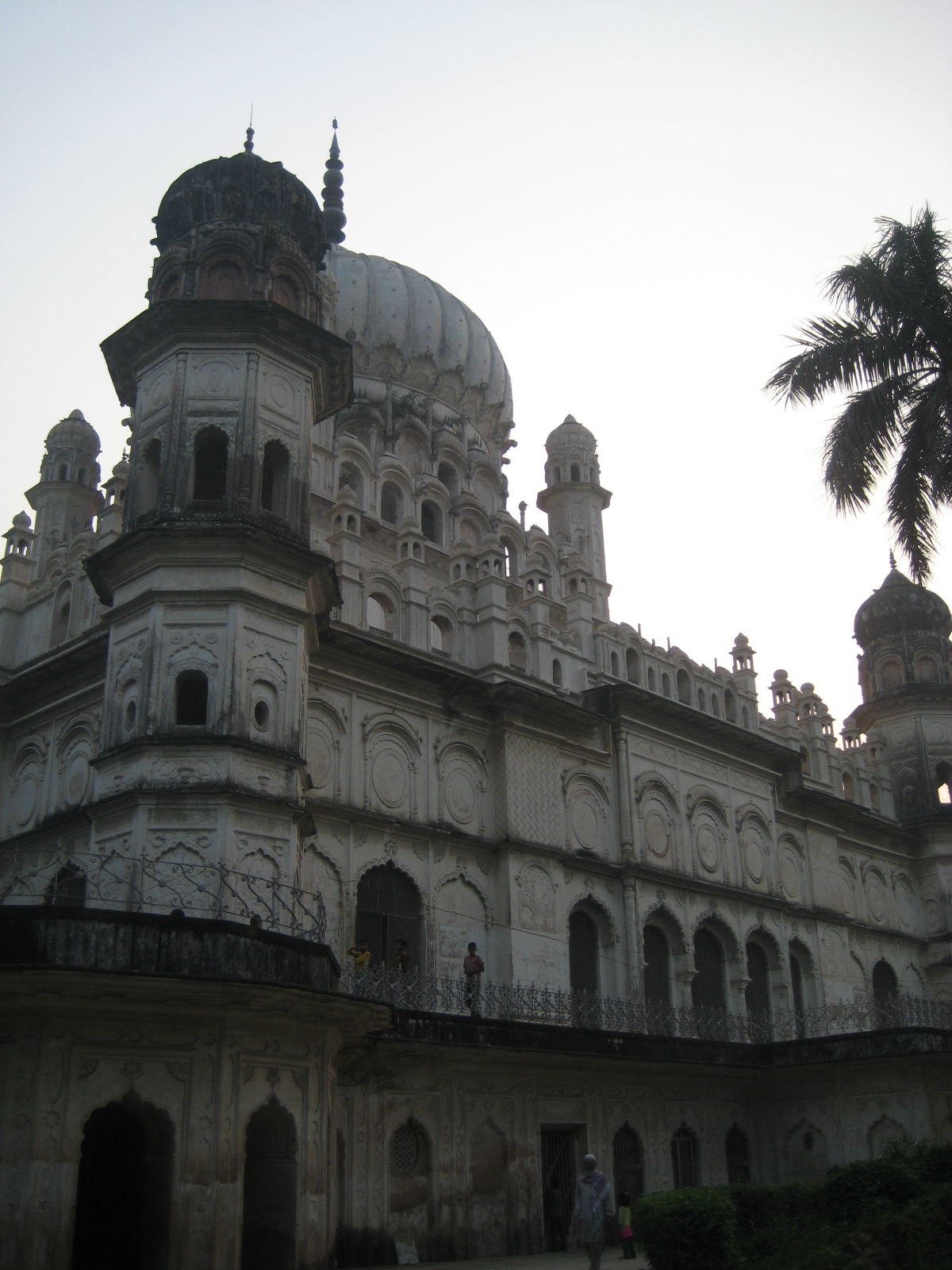
The majestic architecture

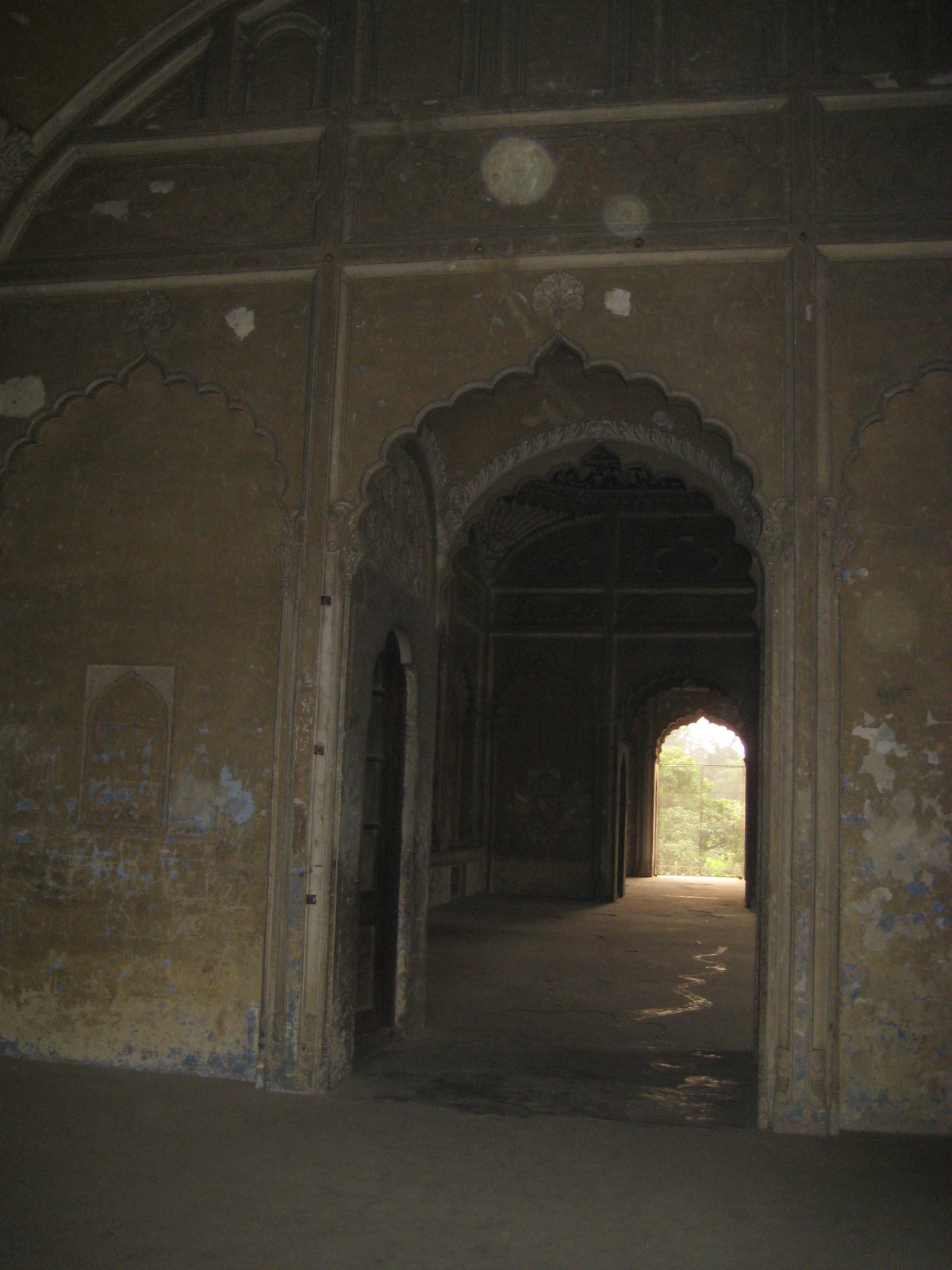
Arched entrance to halls inside Maqbara.

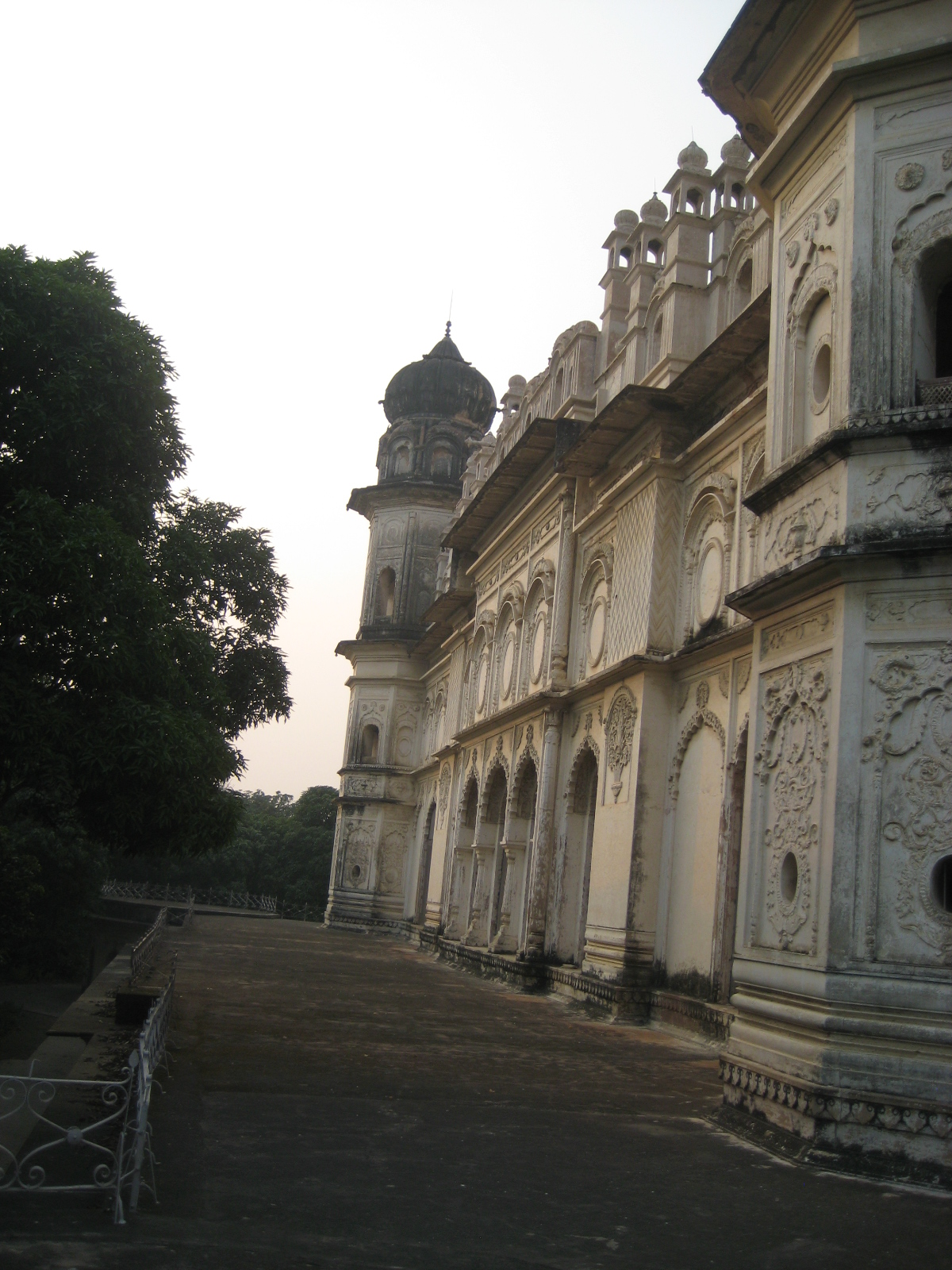

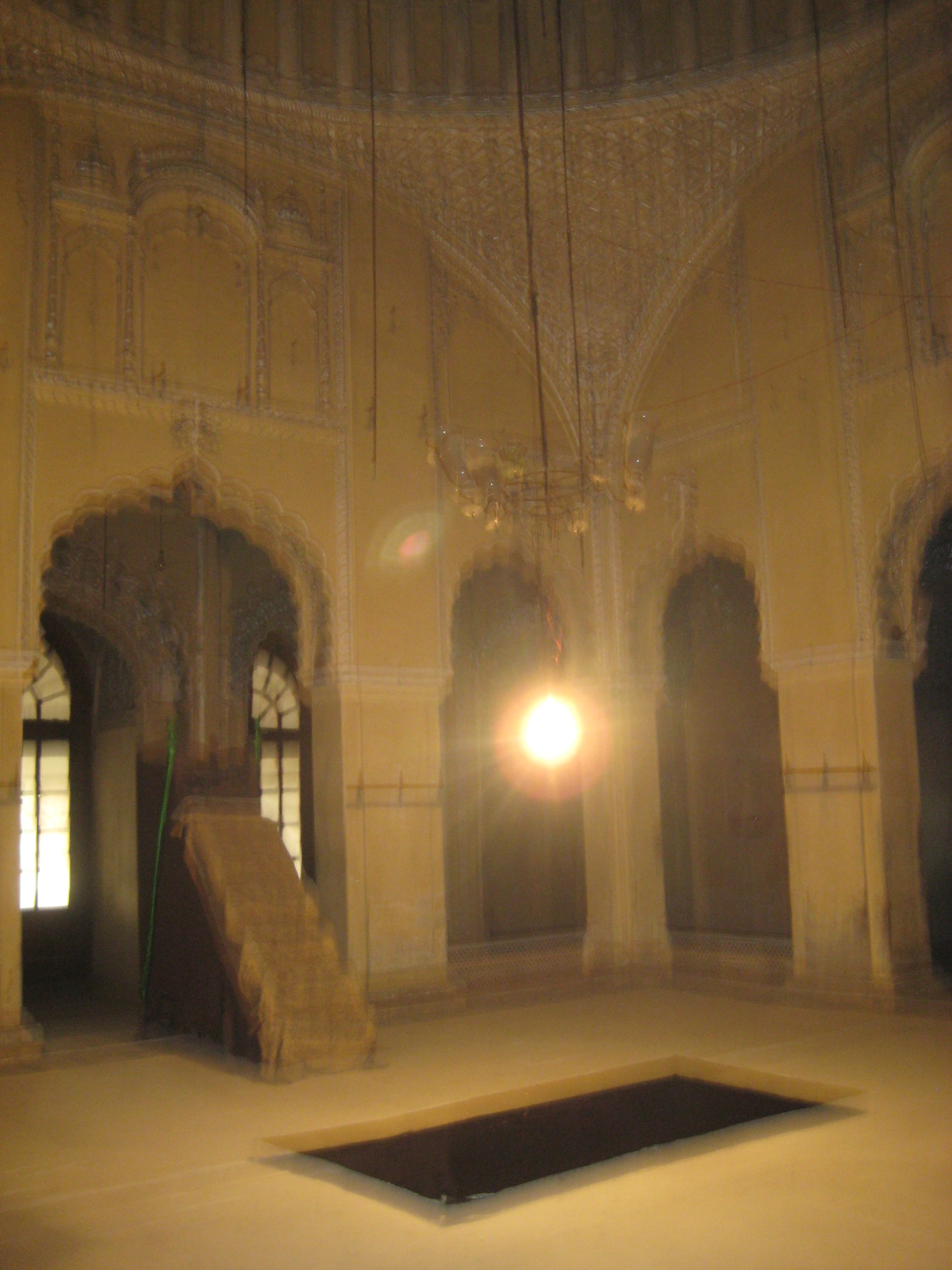
A hall inside maqbara of Bahu Begum

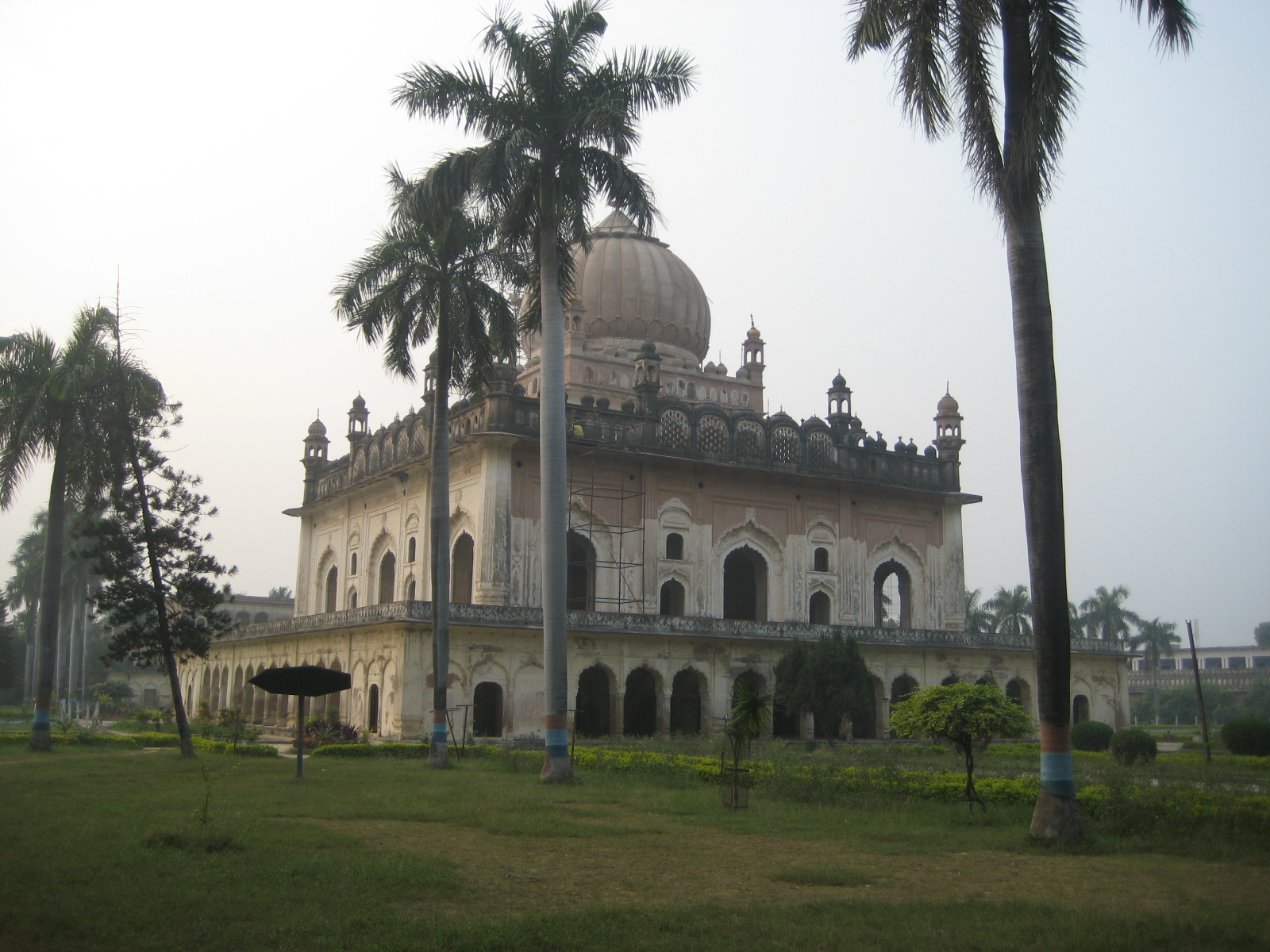
Gulab Bari, The Mausoleum of Nawab Shuja ud Daulah,

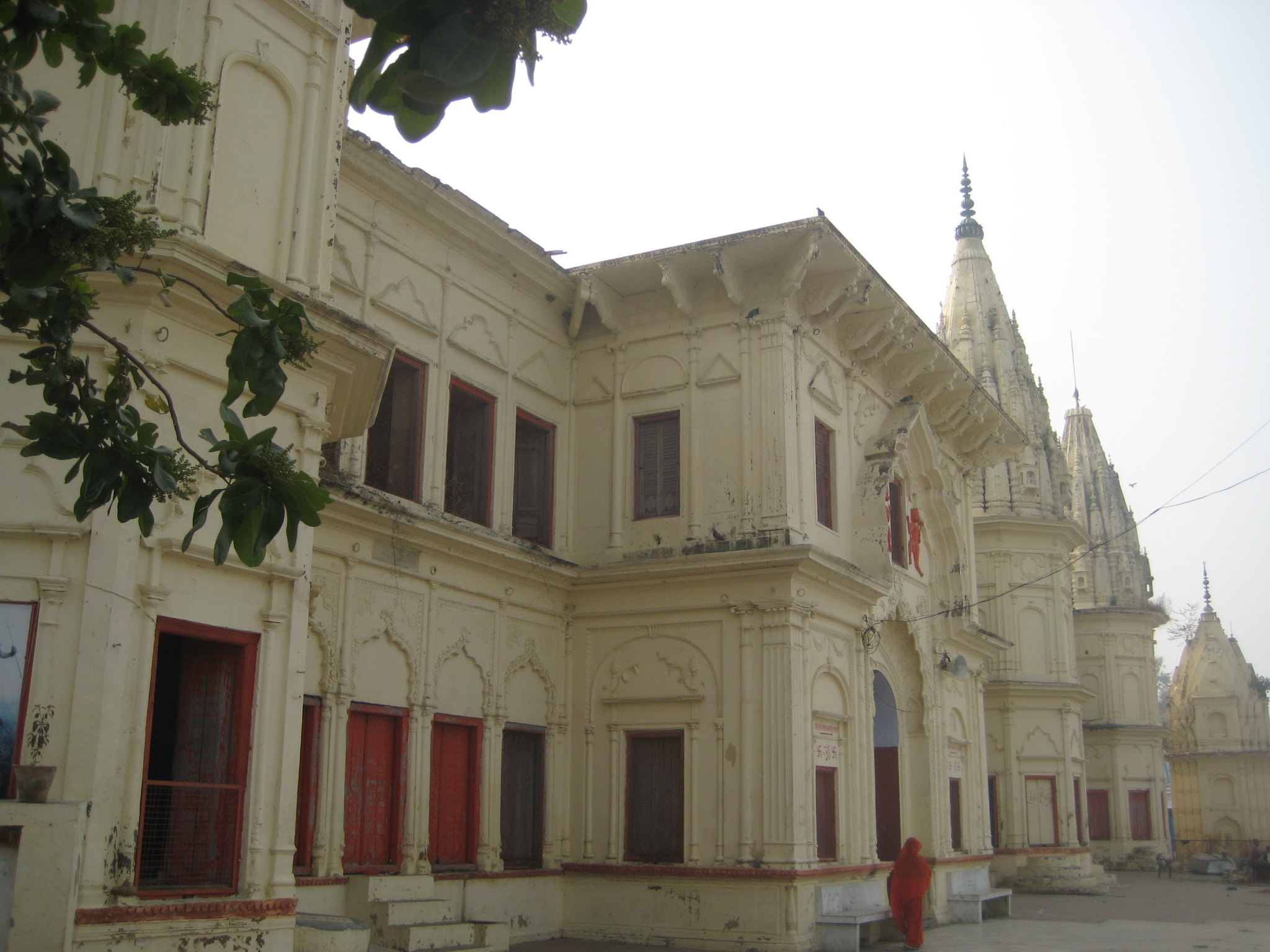
The temple at Guptar Ghat

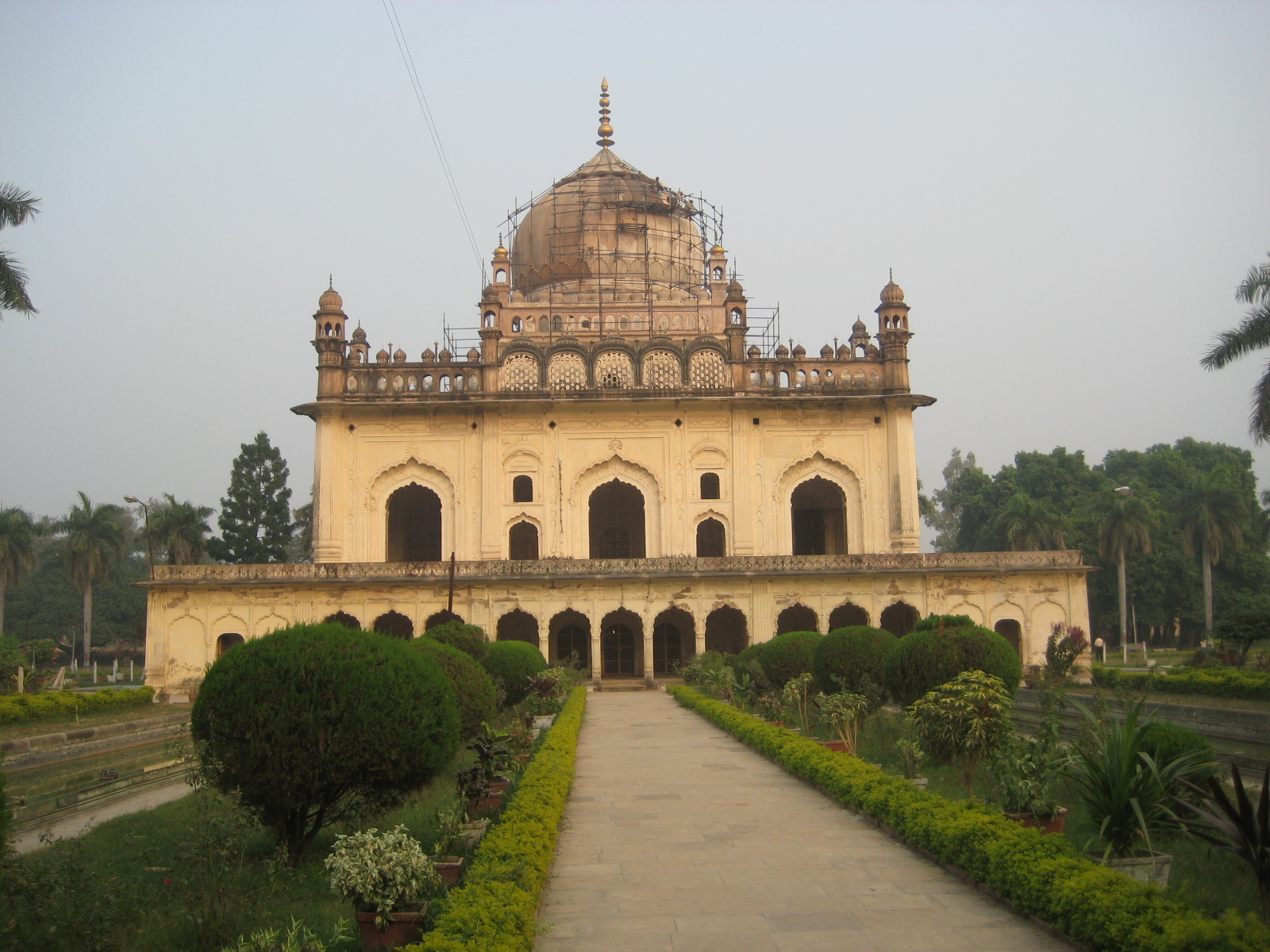
Gulab Bari

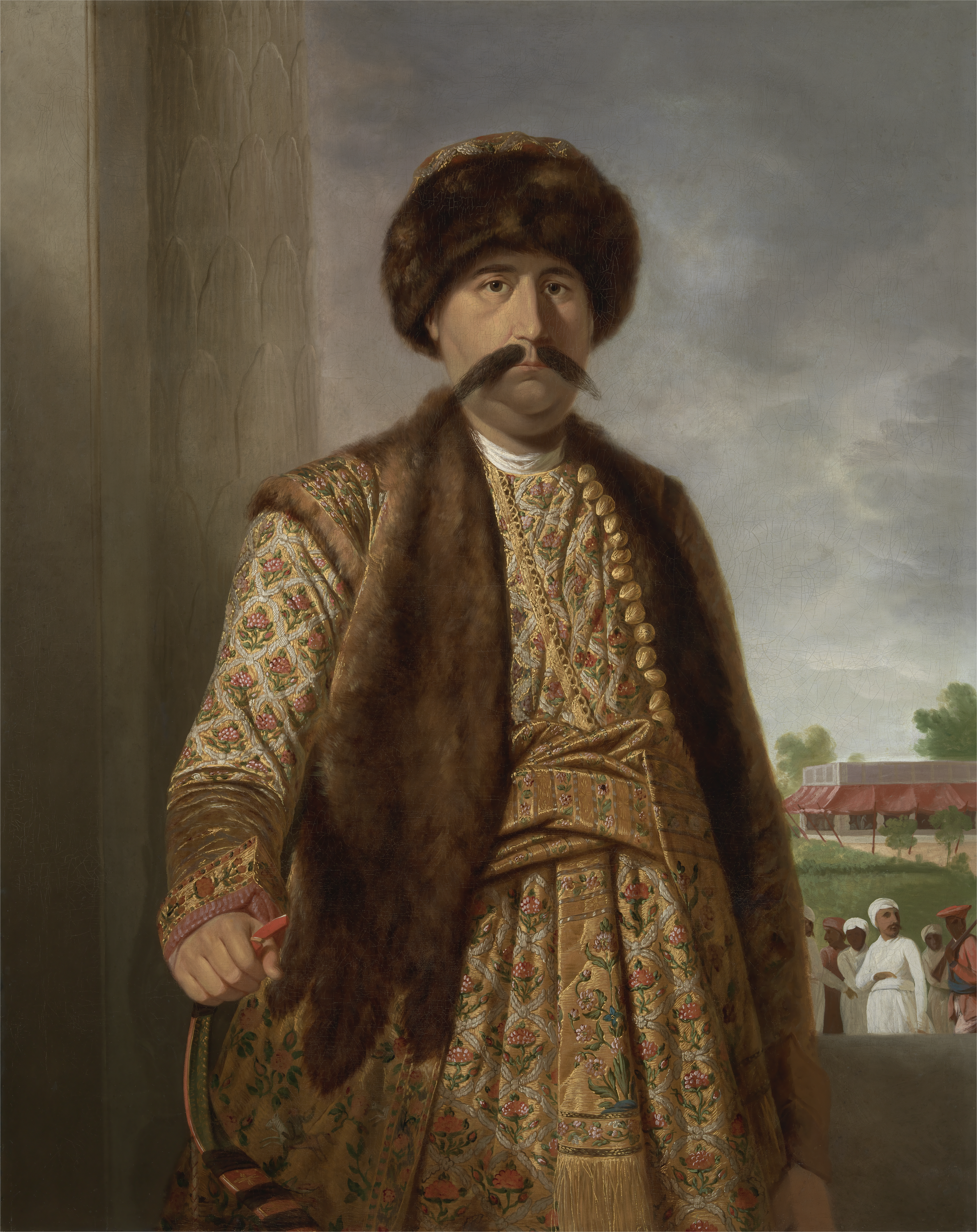
Shuja-ud-Daula

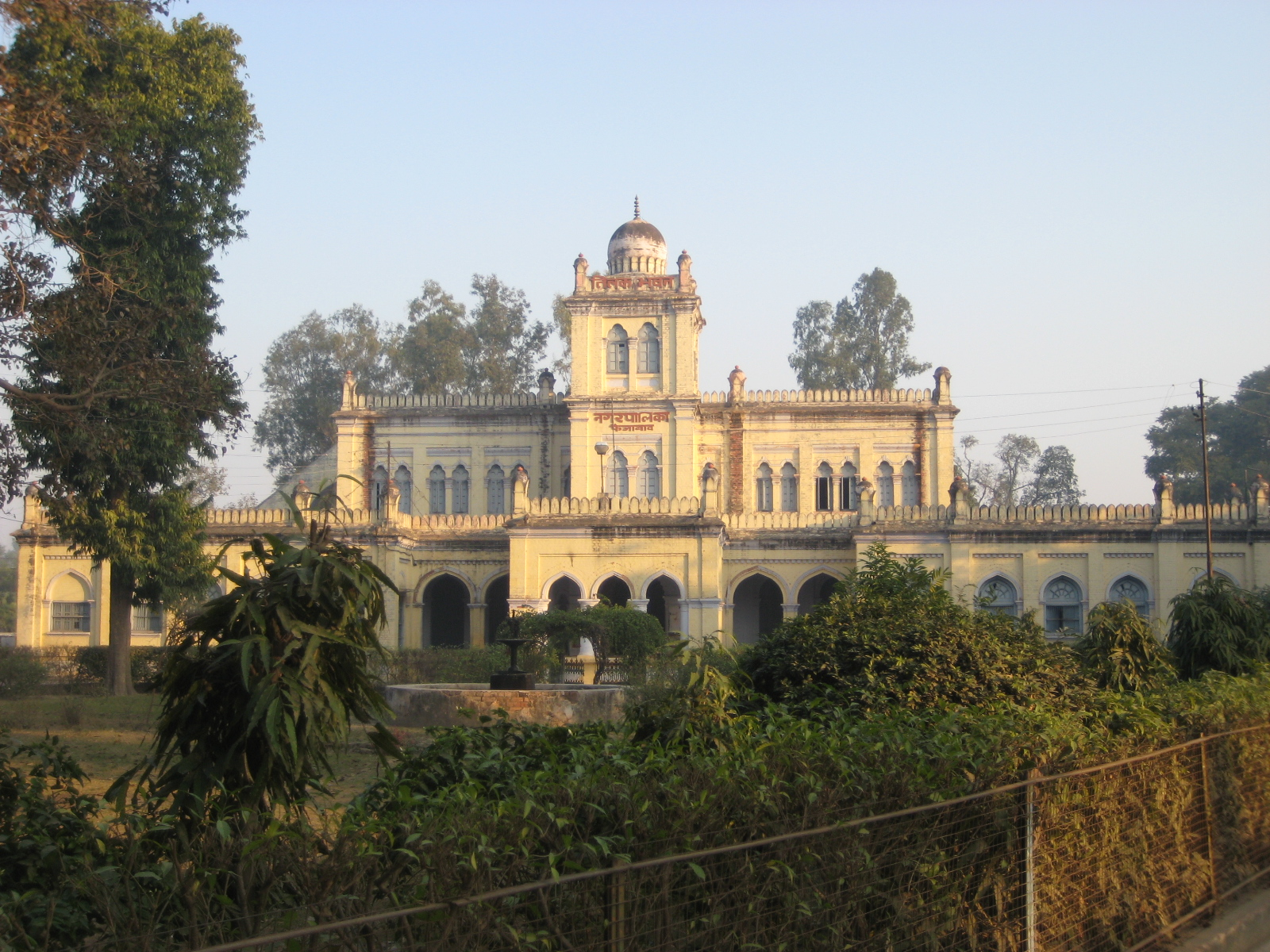
Tilak Hall, Faizabad's town hall, office of the municipal board. During the Raj, was known as "Victoria Memorial Hall"

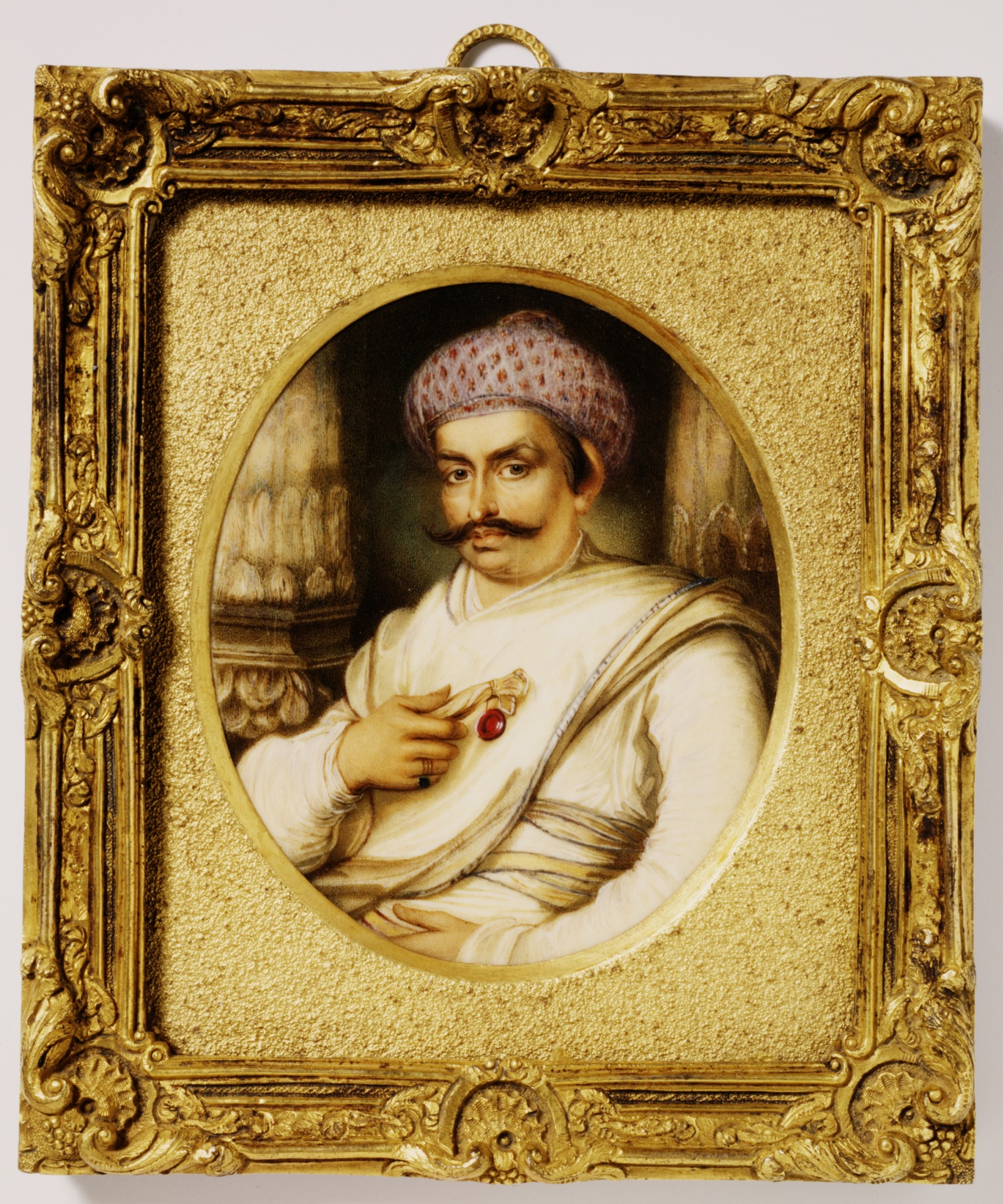
Portrait of Hyder Beg Khan, the Minister to the Nawab of A Wadh, Asaf-Au-Daula
