= Aliganj Hanuman Temple =

Hindu temple in Lucknow

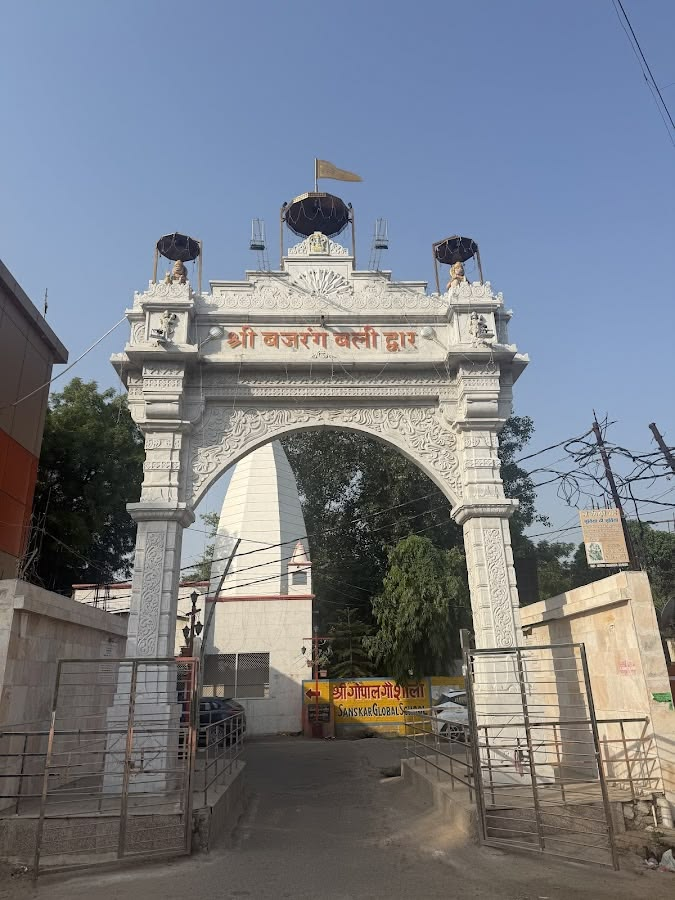

Religion
- Affiliation: Hinduism
- District: Lucknow
- Deity: Hanuman
- Festivals: Dussehra, Hanuman Jayanti, Bada Mangal, Ram Navami, Deepawali
- Governing body: Aliganj Shri Mahavir Ji Trust

Location
- State: Uttar Pradesh
- Country: India
- Interactive map of Aliganj Hanuman Temple
- Coordinates: 26.88387°N 80.950366°E

Website
- www.aliganjhanumanmandir.org

Aliganj Hanuman Temple is a Hindu temple dedicated to deity Hanuman in Uttar Pradesh, India. Located in Lucknow, it is one of the most important temples in the city along with other temples such as Mankameshwar Temple and Chandrika Devi Temple. It is associated with the annual Bade Mangal or Mahavir Mela, held on Tuesdays during the Hindu month of Jyeshtha. This shrine is operates under the Aliganj Shri Mahavir Ji Trust.

== History ==
There are two ancient temples in the Aliganj area dedicated to Lord Hanuman, that date to the period of nawabi rule of the kingdom of Awadh.

=== Purana Mandir ===
Aliganj’s Purana Hanuman Mandir, said to be one of the oldest Hanuman temple in the city. Located on the western bank of the Gomti River.

Local tradition associates the older Hanuman shrine of Aliganj with the Ramayana period. According to this tradition, when Rama decided to send Sita away, Lakshmana and Hanuman accompanied her towards the hermitage (āśrama) of Valmiki at Bithoor. They are said to have halted overnight in the area now associated with Aliganj, near Lakshman Tila and the present-day Hewett Polytechnic. Sita rested there as evening approached, while Lakshmana went to his palace on Lakshman Tila and Hanuman remained behind to protect her.

A temple was later believed to have been established at this site and was known as Hanuman Bari ("Hanuman’s orchard’’). In the 14th century, Bakhtiyar Khilji changed its name to Islambari.

The present Purana Hanuman Mandir established in 1783, during the late eighteenth century at Aliganj is traditionally linked with Janab-i-Aliya Begum, also known as Aliya Begum (her maiden name Chhattar Kunwar), the wife of Nawab Shuja-ud-Daula of Awadh. She was the mother of Nawab Saadat Ali Khan II and the grandmother of Nawab Wajid Ali Shah.

According to a popular tradition, Aliya Begum was a devout follower of Lord Hanuman,she is said to have prayed to him for a child. Following the birth of her son, Nawab Saadat Ali Khan II, she is said to have arranged for the renovation of the older temple and the construction of a new Hanuman temple in Aliganj.

Aliya Begum received instructions in a dream to excavate a site near the old temple. An svayambhu idol of Hanuman was reportedly discovered there and placed on an elephant for transportation. The idol was initially intended to be installed near the Bara Imambara (built by Nawab Asaf-ud-Daula), but when the elephant reached the present-day site of the Aliganj temple, it sat down and refused to move further. This was interpreted by the Begum and her attendants as a divine indication that Hanuman's wish to remain at that location on the western bank of the Gomti, after which idol was therefore installed at the site, and a temple was constructed there. The temple subsequently developed into an important centre of Hanuman worship in Lucknow.Aliya Begum is also said to have installed a crescent and star atop the temple dome; the symbols remain on the structure.

Some accounts also connect the beginning of the fair with an outbreak of plague, during which devotees reportedly visited the temple and attributed their recovery to Hanuman. Another local tradition holds that Aliya Begum organised celebrations and distributed charity after recovering from an illness; this event is also associated with the origin of the annual fair and the naming of Aliganj.

=== Naya Mandir ===
Naya Mandir also known as Aliganj Mahavir Temple. The present main shrine of the Aliganj Hanuman Temple was commissioned in 1783 by Lala Jatmal, a Marwari merchant associated with the trade in aromatic substances. According to local tradition, Jatmal supplied saffron and musk for the construction of Kaiserbagh and later financed the rebuilding of the temple. The principal pavilion (mandap) was reportedly completed on 6 May 1783.The land for the temple is said to have been granted by the Mahmudabad Estate.

Temple tradition holds that the idol of Hanuman is swayambhu (self-manifested). It is said to have been discovered underground by Mahant Khasa Ram after he received instructions in a dream. The temple was constructed at his behest, and Sadanand Ji is regarded as its first priest. A pond known as Pushkarini, located near the temple, is believed to predate the present structure and is cited in local accounts as evidence of the site's earlier religious significance.

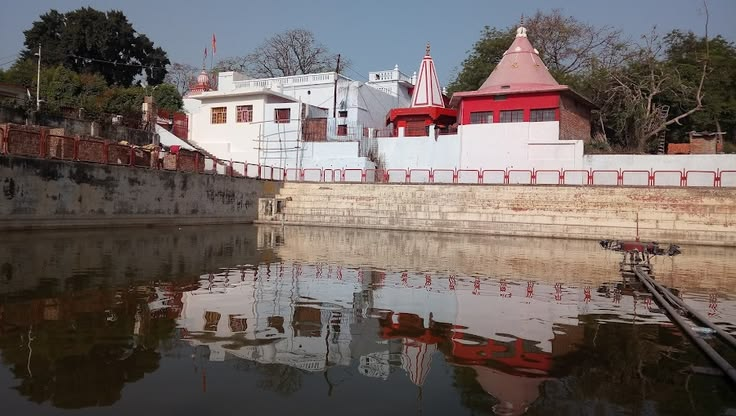
Pampa Sarovar at Naya Hanuman Temple

The temple is regarded by devotees as a Siddha Kshetra, or a place of special spiritual significance.Sadanand Ji served as the temple's first priest. According to a local legend, Hanuman appeared before an ascetic at the site. Over time, the temple received donations of land and money from devotees. It was formerly surrounded by a garden; the present complex is enclosed by walls and gateways, with shops along parts of its perimeter.

== Location ==
The temple is located in Aliganj, in the northern part of Lucknow, Uttar Pradesh, India. It can be reached by road from various parts of the city. Gomti Nagar railway station is the nearest railway station, while Chaudhary Charan Singh International Airport, also known as Amausi Airport, is the nearest airport. Local buses, taxis and auto rickshaws provide connectivity to the temple from the railway station, airport and other parts of Lucknow.

== Significance ==
The temple is associated with Bade Mangal, also known as the Mahāvīr melā, a religious observance held on Tuesdays during the Hindu month of Jyeshtha. The fair attracts large numbers of devotees and is regarded as one of the principal annual religious gatherings in Lucknow. The first Tuesday of Jyeshtha is traditionally considered particularly significant. According to local belief, Hanuman manifested at the site on that day.

Devotees visit the temple on each Tuesday of Jyeshtha and perform parikrama (circumambulation) of the Aliganj Hanuman temples. Some pilgrims undertake dandavati parikrama, in which they progress by repeatedly prostrating themselves along the route. Participants are sometimes described as wearing red loincloths, associated with Hanuman worship.

A special feature of this festival is the vow (sankalp) taken by many male worshipers to circumambulate the temple with full-body prostrations, or by rolling in the dust, while clad only in red loincloths. This vow may be performed in gratitude for the fulfillment of a request (manauti), or to petition for one. The temple is also said to provide, free of charge, outfitting for Hanumans being established elsewhere: sindoor (vermilion), red loincloths, crowns, bells, silver parasols, and other items ‘‘blessed’’ by having been briefly used by the murti here.

The festival has historically been associated with the Nawabs of Awadh. Local accounts state that Nawab Wajid Ali Shah arranged meals for Brahmins during the observance, while women of the Nawabi household distributed chickpeas to monkeys. Monkeys were traditionally revered because of their association with Hanuman, and some accounts state that their killing was prohibited during the Nawabi period.

Although the observance was initially centred on the Aliganj Mahavir Temple, Bade Mangal celebrations later spread to Hanuman temples elsewhere in Lucknow and the surrounding district.Along with Muharram, the festival has been described in local accounts as one of the city's major traditional fairs.

== Festivals ==
- Hanuman Jayanti
- Bada Mangal
- Rama Navami
- Dussehra
- Deepawali

== Gallery ==
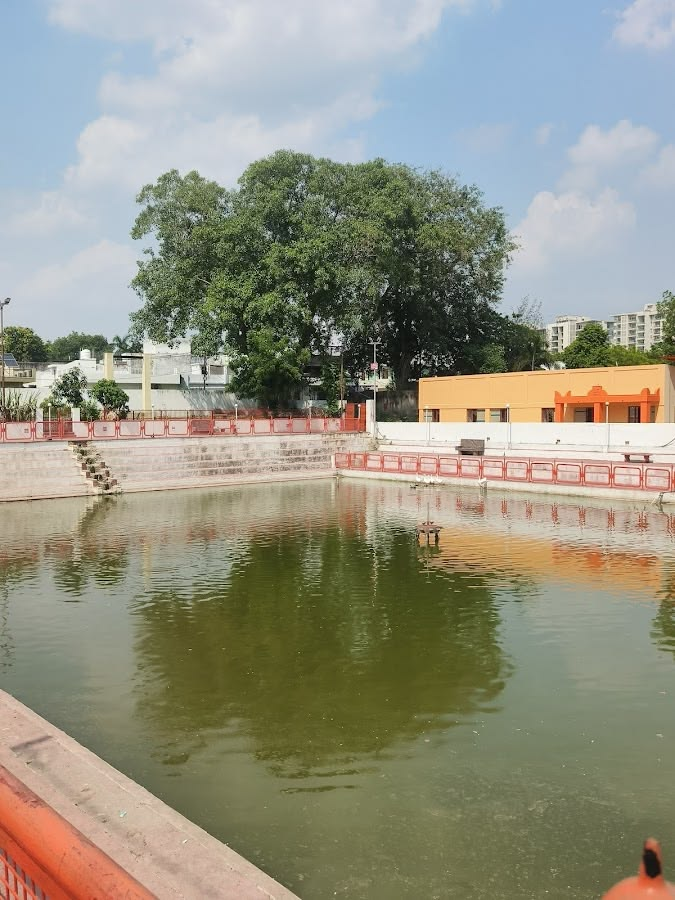
Pampa Sarovar

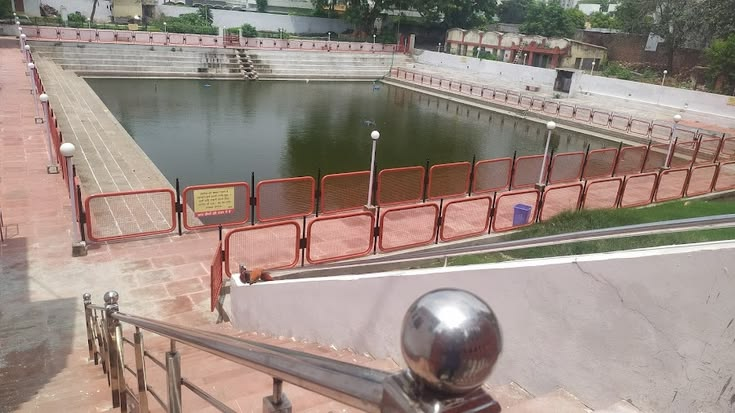
Pampa Sarovar

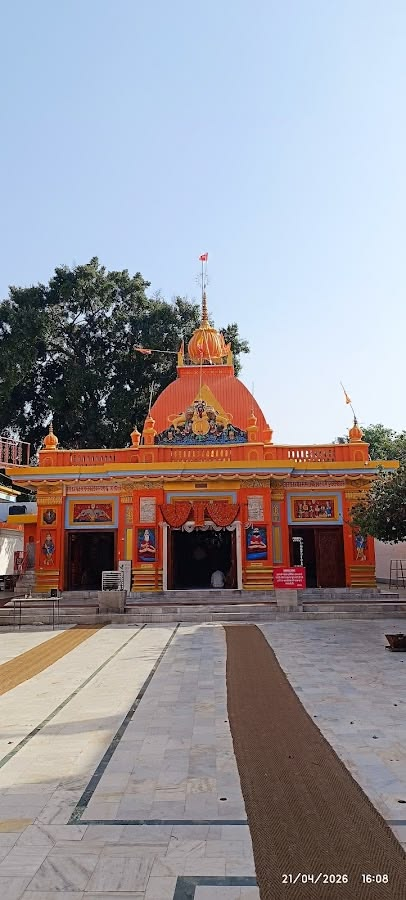
