= Chattar Kunwar =

Hindu wife of third king of Awadh

- Janab-e-Alia
- Burial: Maqbara Alia, Lucknow, Uttar Pradesh, India
- Spouse: Nawab Shuja-ud-Daula
- Issue: Nawab Saadat Ali Khan
- Religion: Hindu

Chattar Kunwar, better known by her title Janab-e-Alia, was the Hindu wife of Shuja-ud-Daula, the third Nawab of Awadh in northern India from 1754 to 1775. She was the mother of Saadat Ali Khan, who became the sixth Nawab of Awadh in 1798. When laying the foundation for a new palace, her son named Chattar Manzil after her. Her tomb, Maqbara Alia in Lucknow, Uttar Pradesh, is protected under the Archaeological Survey of India.

Today she is associated with the Naya Hanuman temple in the Aliganj area of Lucknow, as well as the Bada Mangal festival during the Hindu month of Jyeshtha.

== Early life and family ==
She was born Hindu into a Raikwar Thakur family from Baudi riyasat, near Bahraich. Chattar Kunwar was part of the zenana of the Shia Muslim court of Awadh, and was the mother of Mirza Mangli, later known as Saadat Ali Khan.

Although Nawab Shuja-ud-Daula favoured her son Mirza Mangli as his heir, his chief consort Bahu Begum insisted that their eldest son Asaf-ud-Daula should succeed him. Asaf-ud-Daula thus became nawab following the death of Shuja-ud-Daula in 1775. Saadat Ali Khan became the sixth Nawab of Awadh 23 years later, in 1798. Following his accession, Saadat Ali Khan gave his mother the title Janab-e-Alia, which reportedly upset Bahu Begum.

== Hanuman temple in Aliganj ==
In the present day, she is often mentioned as a devotee of Hanuman. According to popular folklore, hoping to conceive, Janab-e-Alia prayed at the old Hanuman temple in Aliganj, and then had a son. In gratitude, she had the old temple renovated and had a new one built. The new temple was built by her son, Nawab Saadat Ali Khan.

In another version of the story, a divine entity told her in a dream to excavate a site, where an idol of Hanuman was unearthed. According to The Hindustan Times, the location was not far from present-day Hewett Polytechnic near Rahimnagar in Lucknow. As the idol was being transported, the elephant carrying it sat down and refused to move. Tradition holds that Janab-e-Alia took this as a sign to build a new temple to Hanuman in the exact spot in Aliganj.

== Tomb in Golaganj ==
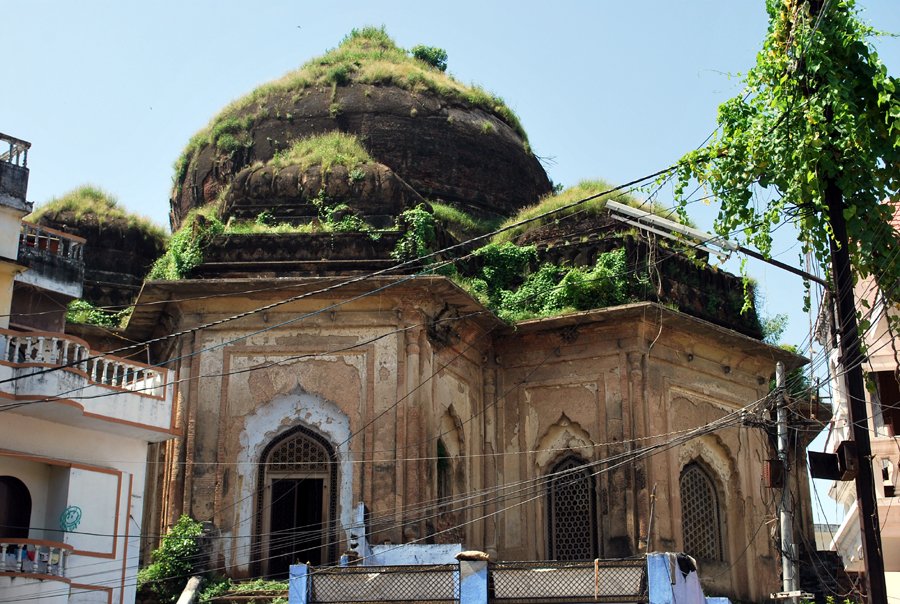
Maqbara Alia (Tomb of Chattar Kunwar) in 2012

Maqbara Alia, the Tomb of Alia, is located in the Golaganj neighbourhood of Lucknow, near a vegetable market. Her tomb was built by Saadat Ali Khan on top of the actual grave of his mother, which lies in its basement. Octagonal in shape, it has a main dome at the center surrounded by eight smaller domes.

Described in 1883 as a "grand mausoleum", as of 2024, the building had fallen into disrepair with broken windows and falling plaster. Neglected for decades, the tomb is now being encroached on all sides. The former imambara in front of the tomb was converted into a house called Mishra Bhavan.
