= Nagla Murli =

Nagla Murli Murli Nagla
- Village
- Location in Uttar Pradesh, India
- Coordinates: 27.43°N 79.124°E
- Country: India
- State: Uttar Pradesh
- District: Etah

Population (2011)
  - Total: 1,200

Languages
  - Official: Hindi
- Time zone: UTC+5:30 (IST)

Nagla Murli is a village located at 27.43°N,79.124°E, It has an average elevation of 170 metres (557 feet). It comes under the administration of Aliganj Tehsil, Within Etah district of Uttar Pradesh state of India. Nearest cities are Etah, Mainpuri, and Farrukhabad.

As of 2001 India census, Nagla Murli had a population of 1200. Males constitute 53% of the population and females 47%. Nagla Murli has an average literacy rate of 53%, lower than the national average of 59.5%; with 60% of the males and 40% of females literate. 18% of the population is under six years of age.

There is a primary school located in the village.
