= Hanuman Garhi Temple =

Hindu Temple in Uttar Pradesh, India

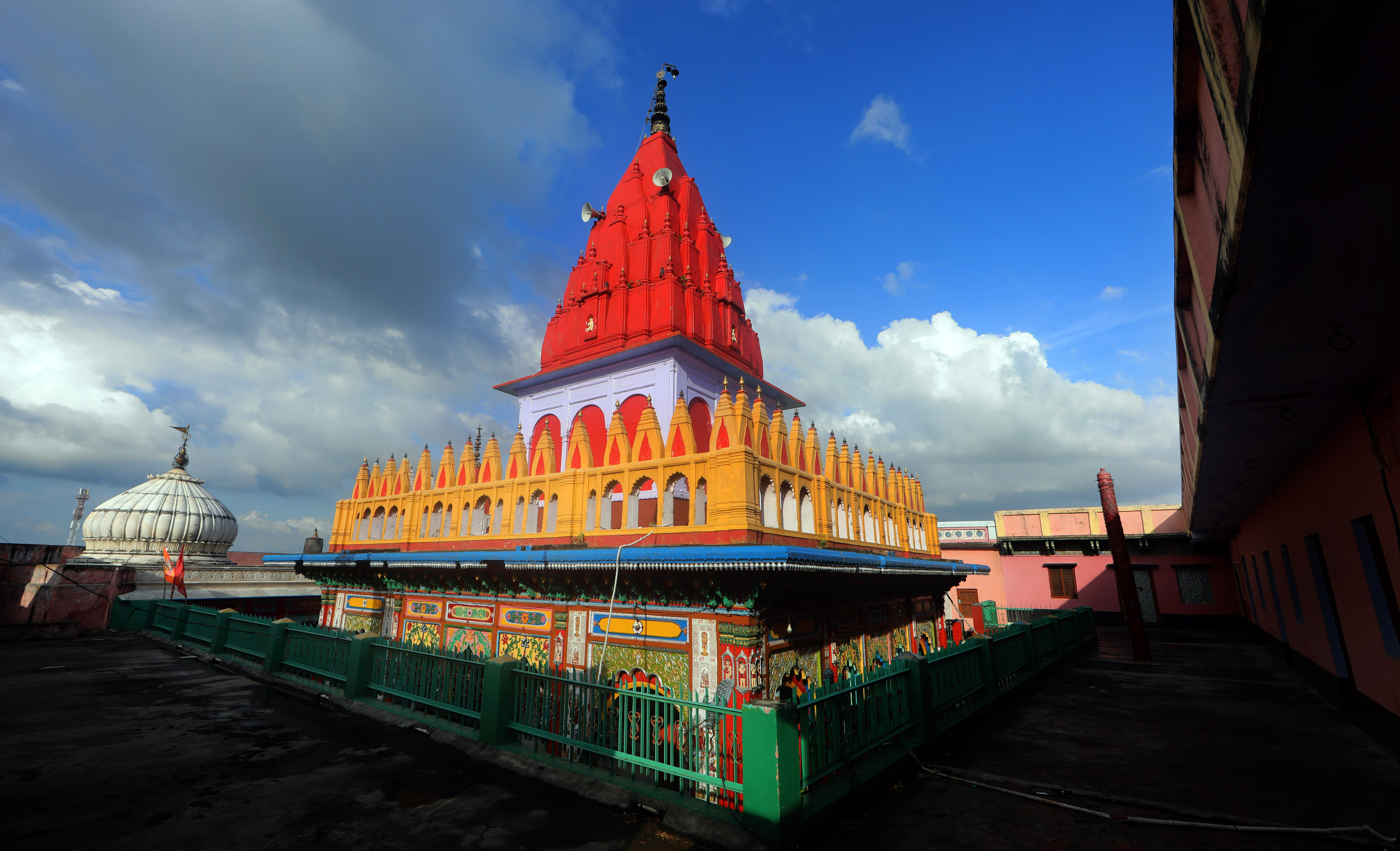
- The Hanuman Garhi Temple in Ayodhya

Religion
- Affiliation: Hinduism
- District: Ayodhya
- Deity: Hanuman
- Festivals: Dussehra, Hanuman Jayanti, Bada Mangal, Ram Navami, Deepawali

Location
- State: Uttar Pradesh
- Country: India
- Interactive map of Hanuman Garhi Temple

Architecture
- Completed: 10th Century

Website
- www.hanumangarhiayodhya.com

Hanuman Garhi Temple is a Hindu temple of Hanuman in Uttar Pradesh, India. Located in Ayodhya, it is one of the most important temples in the city along with other temples such as Ram Mandir and Nageshwar Nath. This shrine is under the charge of Bairagi Mahants of Ramanandi Sampradaya and Nirvani Akhara.

== History ==
Hanuman Garhi temple is located near Ram Janmabhoomi. According to Legend, after defeating Ravana when Lord Rama and Mata Sita along with Lord Hanuman returned to Ayodhya, the birthplace of Lord Rama, Lord Hanuman started living in a cave in Ayodhya to protect Ramkot. According to the Skanda Purana, King Vikramaditya built Hanuman Garhi along with 360 other temples. But Aurangzeb destroyed The Hanuman Garhi and built a Mosque. Later, The Bairag occupied the land by defeating Nawab Shujauddula the King of Awadh. They removed the Mosque and built a new temple for Lord Hanuman. Some Muslims thought that Hanuman Garhi was built on a mosque. Therefore they tried to break the temple many times but failed. In 1855, the Nawab of Awadh granted land revenue to build the temple. Historian Sarvepalli Gopal has said that the 1855 dispute was not for the Ayodhya temple dispute but for the Hanuman Garhi temple.

== Architecture ==
Hanuman Garhi Temple is shaped like a four-sided fort with circular ramparts at each corner, housing shrines dedicated to the primary deity Hanuman. There are 76 stairs to reach the main temple, where the garbha griha, adorned with silver carvings, awaits. The central has three intricately designed doors leading to the inner chamber. Within, a 6-inch deity of Hanuman, depicted in his youthful (Bal) form, is positioned on the lap of his mother Anjani. A silver tulsi garland, inscribed with the name of Rama is adorned by Hanuman. The verses of the Hanuman Chalisa are inscribed on the temple walls. The temple features a Victory Pillar, known as Vijay Stambh.

== Festivals ==
- Hanuman Jayanti
- Bada Mangal
- Rama Navami
- Dussehra
- Deepawali
