= Usman Enclave, Lucknow =

Residential colony in Uttar Pradesh, India

Usman Enclave is a residential colony for ex-army men, at Aliganj in Lucknow, Uttar Pradesh, India. It is named after Brigadier Mohammad Usman who was the highest-ranking officer of the Indian Army killed in the Indo-Pakistani War of 1947. As a Muslim, he became a symbol of India's inclusive secularism. Constructed in 1982, Usman Enclave is now shared by both army-men and citizens.

== Houses ==
Having 108 houses and divided in five segments, this colony is known as one of the poshest colonies in Lucknow.

== Facilities ==
There is a central park which is used by the colony authorities for marriages and functions. This way money is generated for the welfare of the colony. In 2007 a badminton court was established, which was named Usman Enclave Badminton Club.
