= Daheliya Pooth =

Village in India

Daheliya Pooth, also known as Dahliya Pooth, (Village ID 214577) is a village situated in Aliganj of Etah district, Uttar Pradesh. In this village there are many farmers, generally farming wheat and rice. According to the 2011 census it has a population of 1799 living in 300 households.
