= Gulab Bari =

Tomb of Nawab Shuja-ud-Daula, located in Ayodhya, Uttar Pradesh, India

Coordinates: 26°46′47″N 082°09′26″E

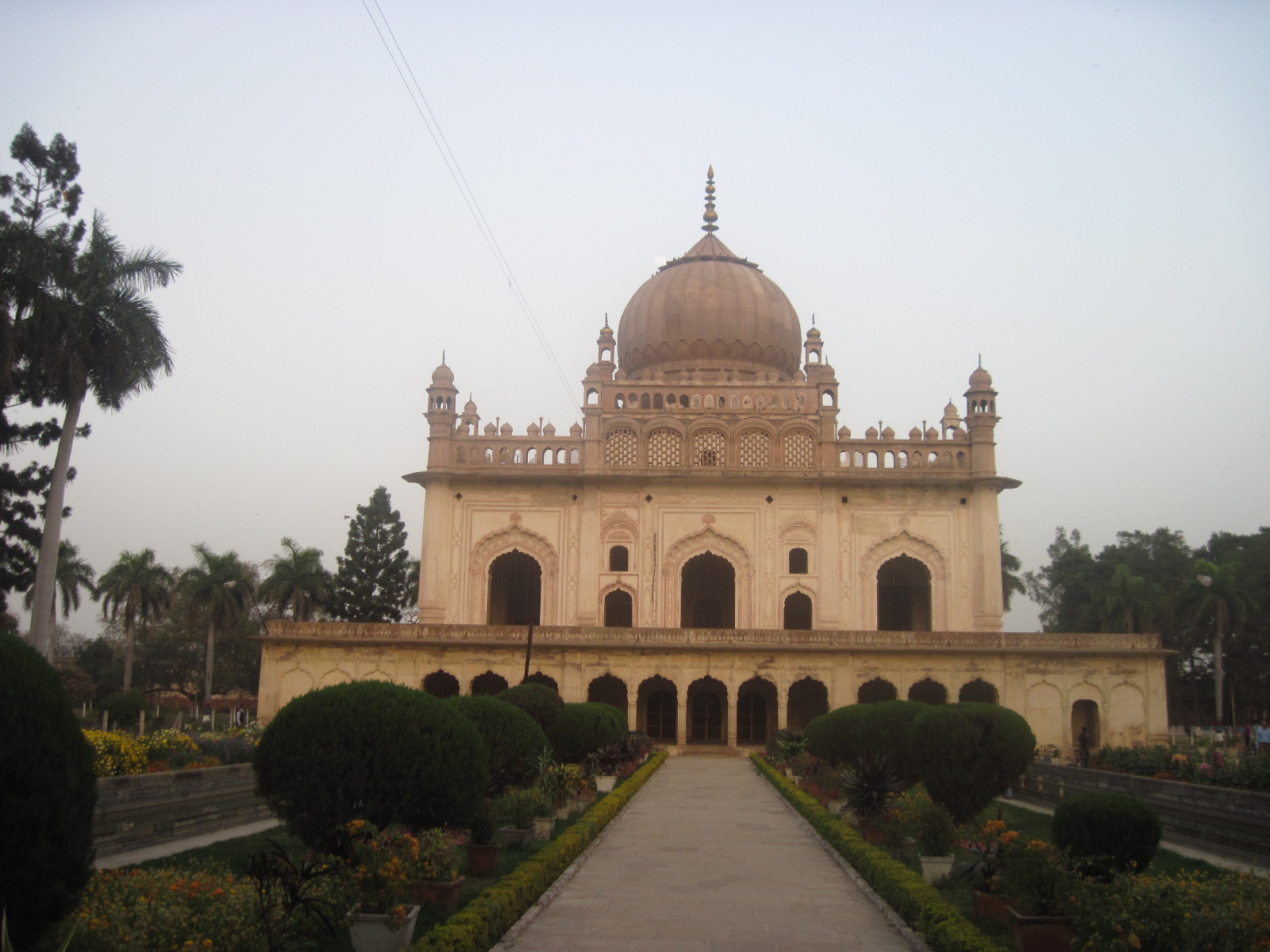
- Gulab Bari, the tomb of Nawab Nawab Shuja-ud-Daula.

- Location in Uttar Pradesh, India
- Location: Faizabad, Ayodhya district, Uttar Pradesh, India

Site notes
- Architectural style: Nawabi

Gulab Bari (lit. 'Garden of Roses') is the Tomb of Nawab Shuja-ud-Daula, located in Faizabad, Ayodhya district of Uttar Pradesh, India. This place has a good collection of roses of various varieties set by the sides of water fountains. Gulab Bari is the maqbara (Mausoleum) of Nawab Shuja-ud-Daula, the third Nawab of Oudh (now Faizabad) in the campus. The monument has declared to be of National Importance under the Ancient Monuments and Archaeological Sites and Remains Act 1958 as updated by the Ancient Monuments and Archaeological Sites and Remains (Amendment and Validation) Act, 2010. Further under Sub-section 20 (a) and 20 (b) of Ancient Monuments and Archaeological Monuments and Remains (Amendment and Validation) Act, 2010.

Gulab Bari is surrounded by an enclosure wall, built of Lakhauri bricks lime plastered and decorated with plaster mouldings. The enclosure contains the tomb of Shuja-ud-daula along with mosque Imambara, Shahi Hammam, Baradari and a well approached through triple-arched gateways. The tomb of Shuja-ud-daula (1753–1775) was constructed by himself during his lifetime which is approached through an imposing gateway. The central chamber contains the cenotaph which houses the graves of Nawab Shuja-ud-daula and his mother. The tomb proper stands in the centre of a Charbagh Garden accompanied by fountains and shallow water channels. The square double-storeyed structure of the mausoleum has an arched verandah on each side, while its upper storey has a three arched façade adorned by minarets on the corners. The dome of the central chamber is crowned by inverted lotus and metal finial.

Gulab Bari is not only a spot that needs to be visited; it is a place of worship and various cultural events. The locals treat it as a holy place. It is said that the monument is connected to a boali in Lucknow and used to be hiding place for the successors of the Nawab Shuja-ud-daula. The fragrance of roses in the Gulab Udyaan brought relief to the busy mind of the nawab and allowed him to work and take decisions. It might have served as soldier's cabin and a house for the servants (not the main monument but the structures around). Today Gulab Bari is though in a poor condition, it still is very important for the locals (mostly of the Muslim Community). It remained very important, remains important and will remain important only if its tourism is boosted and the people become a little more conscious about its importance.

== History ==
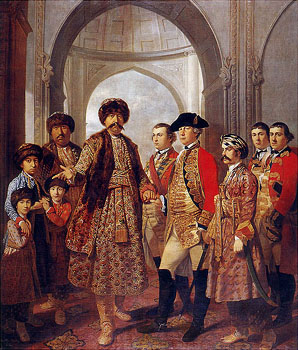
Shuja-ud-Daula, the Nawab of Awadh, with four sons, General Barker and other military officers.

The Nawabs graced Ayodhya with several beautiful buildings, notable among them are the Gulab Bari, Moti Mahal and the tomb of Bahu Begum. Gulab Bari is a beautiful building of fine architecture, standing in a garden surrounded by a wall, approachable through two large gateways. Shuja-ud-Daula's wife was the well known Bahu Begum, who married the Nawab in 1743 and continued to reside in Faizabad, her residence being the Moti-Mahal. Close by at Jawaharbagh lies her Maqbara, where she was buried after her death in 1816. It is considered to be one of the finest buildings of its kind in Avadh, which was built at the cost of three lakh rupees by her chief advisor Darab Ali Khan. A fine view of the city is obtainable from top of the begum's tomb. Bahu Begum was a woman of great distinction and rank, bearing dignity. Most of the Muslim buildings of Faizabad are attributed to her. From the date of Bahu Begum's death in 1815 till the annexation of Avadh, the city of Faizabad gradually fell into decay. The glory of Faizabad finally eclipsed with the shifting of capital from Faizabad to Lucknow by Nawab Asaf-ud-Daula.

Shuja-ud-daula, the Nawab of Awadh, made Faizabad the capital of Awadh. During his reign Faizabad attained prosperity, which it never saw again. He constructed very huge & magnificent buildings in the city. Unique features of these buildings are their assimilative architectural designs. This magnificent building is the mausoleum of Nawab Shuja-ud-daula which is surrounded by a well laid out rose garden. The entire complex is enclosed by a boundary wall with two large gates to gain access. The tomb of Shuja-ud-daula (1753–1775) was constructed by himself during his lifetime which is approached through an imposing gateway. The central chamber contains the cenotaph which houses the graves of Nawab Shuja-ud-daula and his mother. The tomb proper stands in the centre of a Charbagh Garden accompanied by fountains and shallow water channels. The square double-storeyed structure of the mausoleum has an arched verandah on each side, while its upper storey has a three arched façade adorned by minarets on the corners. The dome of the central chamber is crowned by inverted louts and metal finial.

Gulab Bari is open 4 am – 7 pm, year-round. It can be reached by taking a cycle rickshaw from any part of the city

== Gallery ==
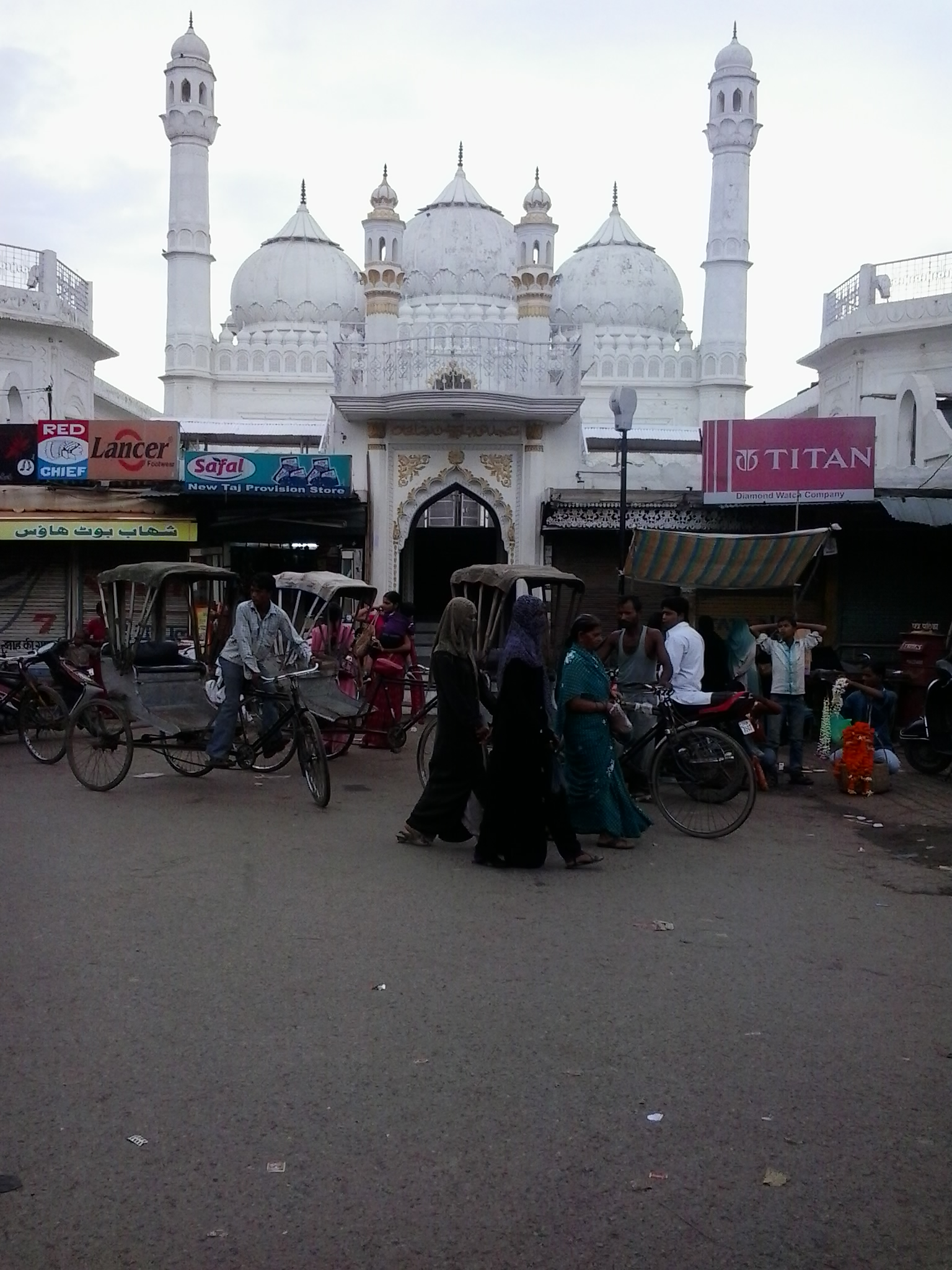

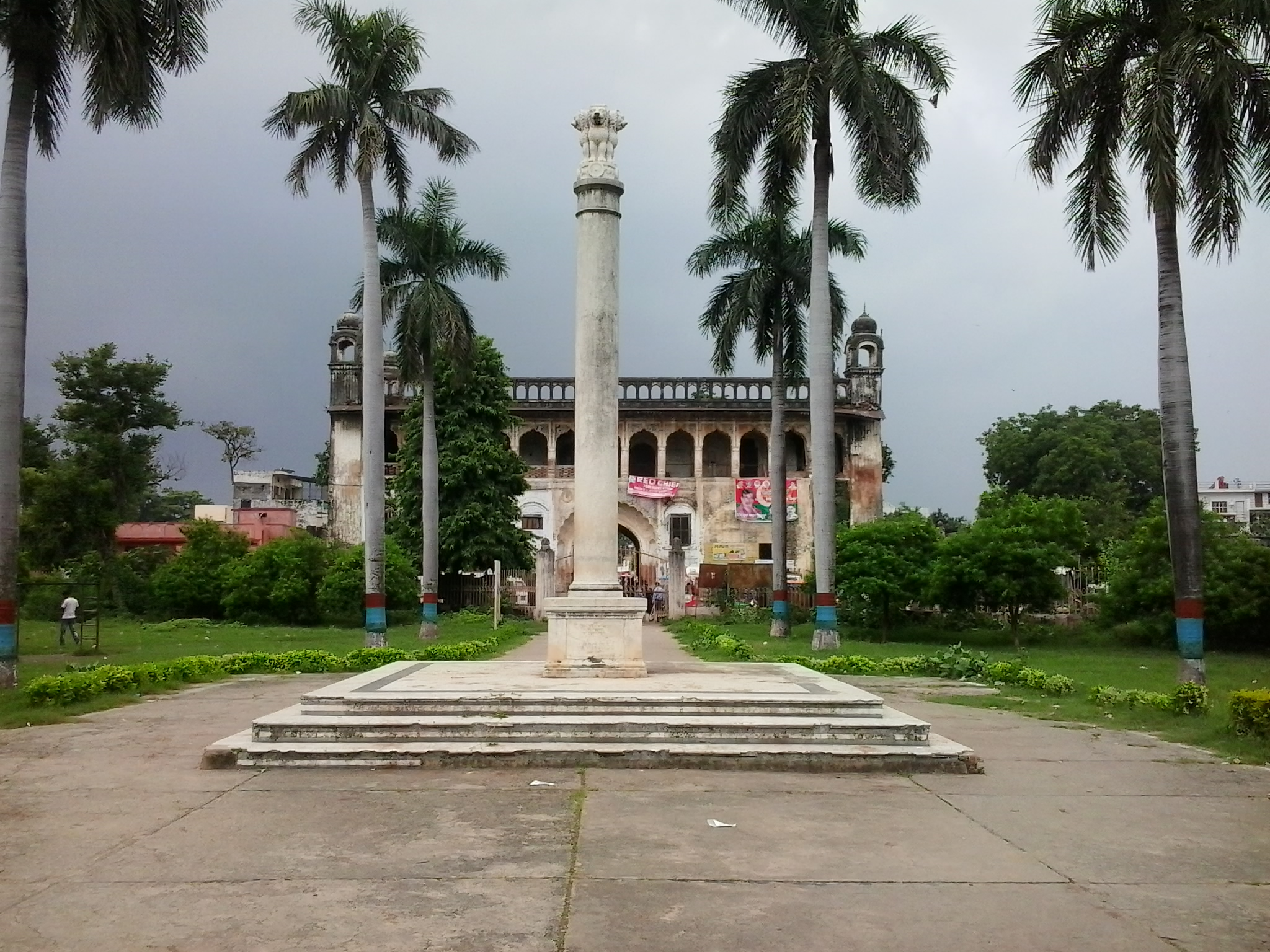

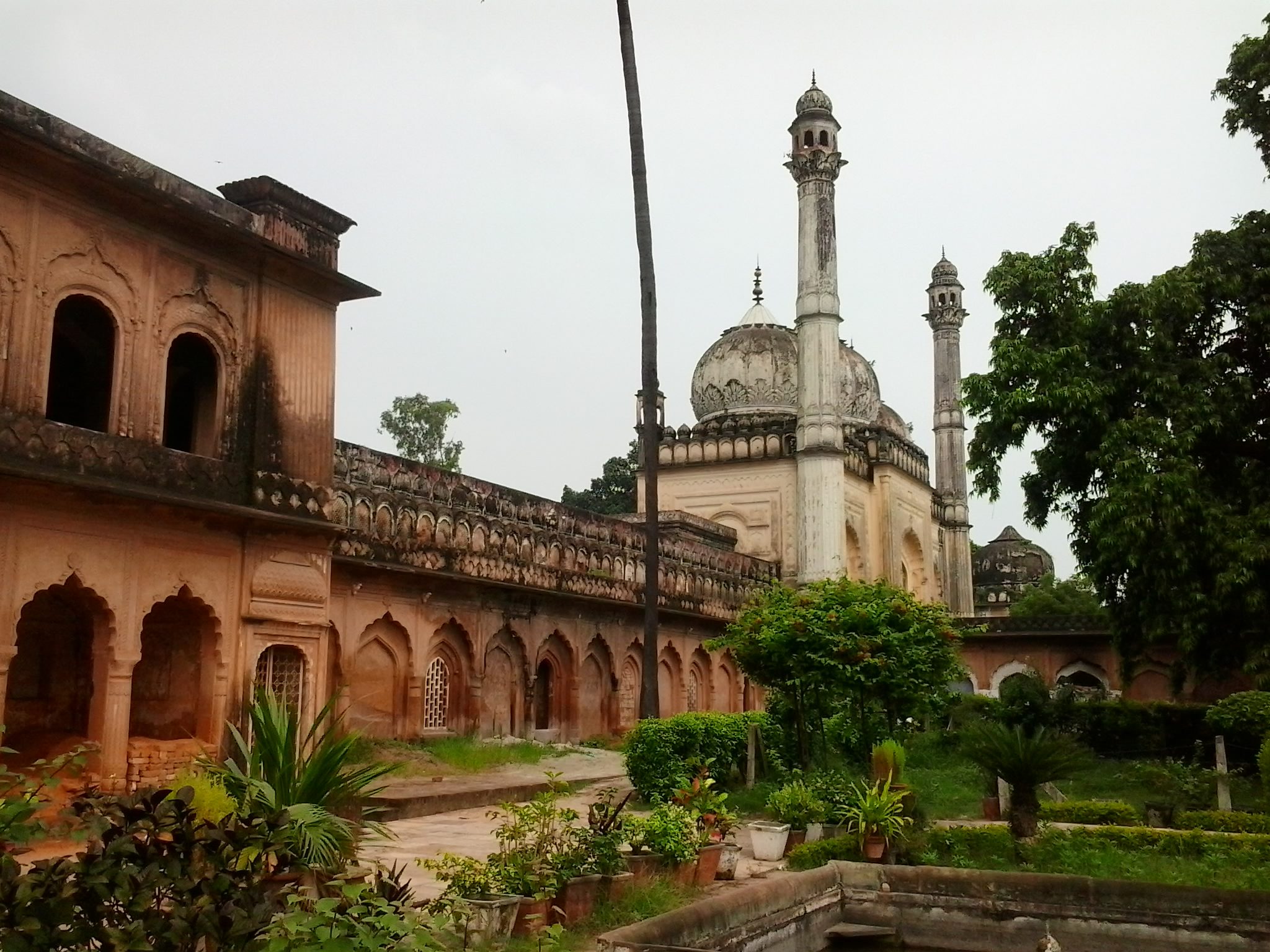

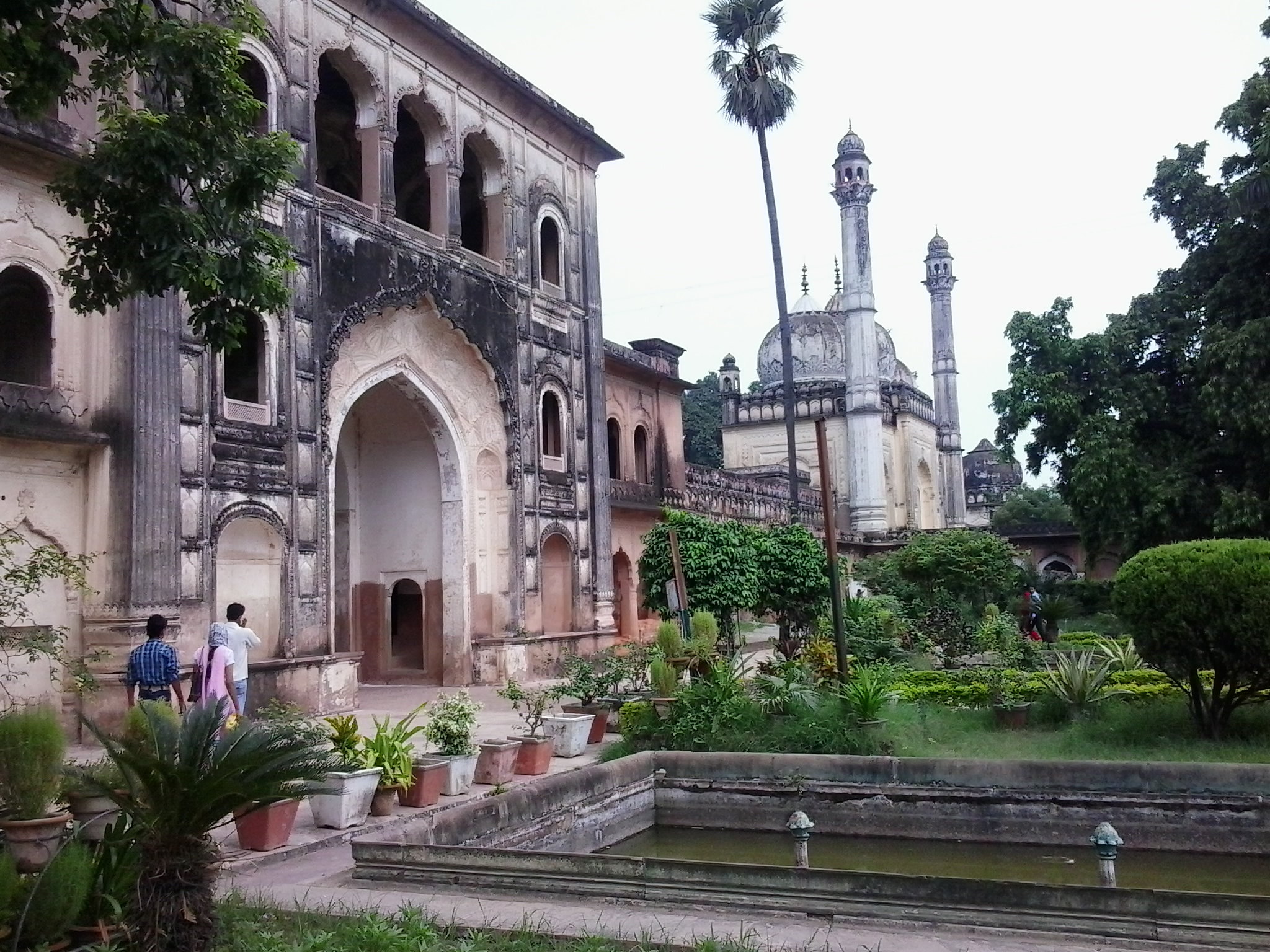

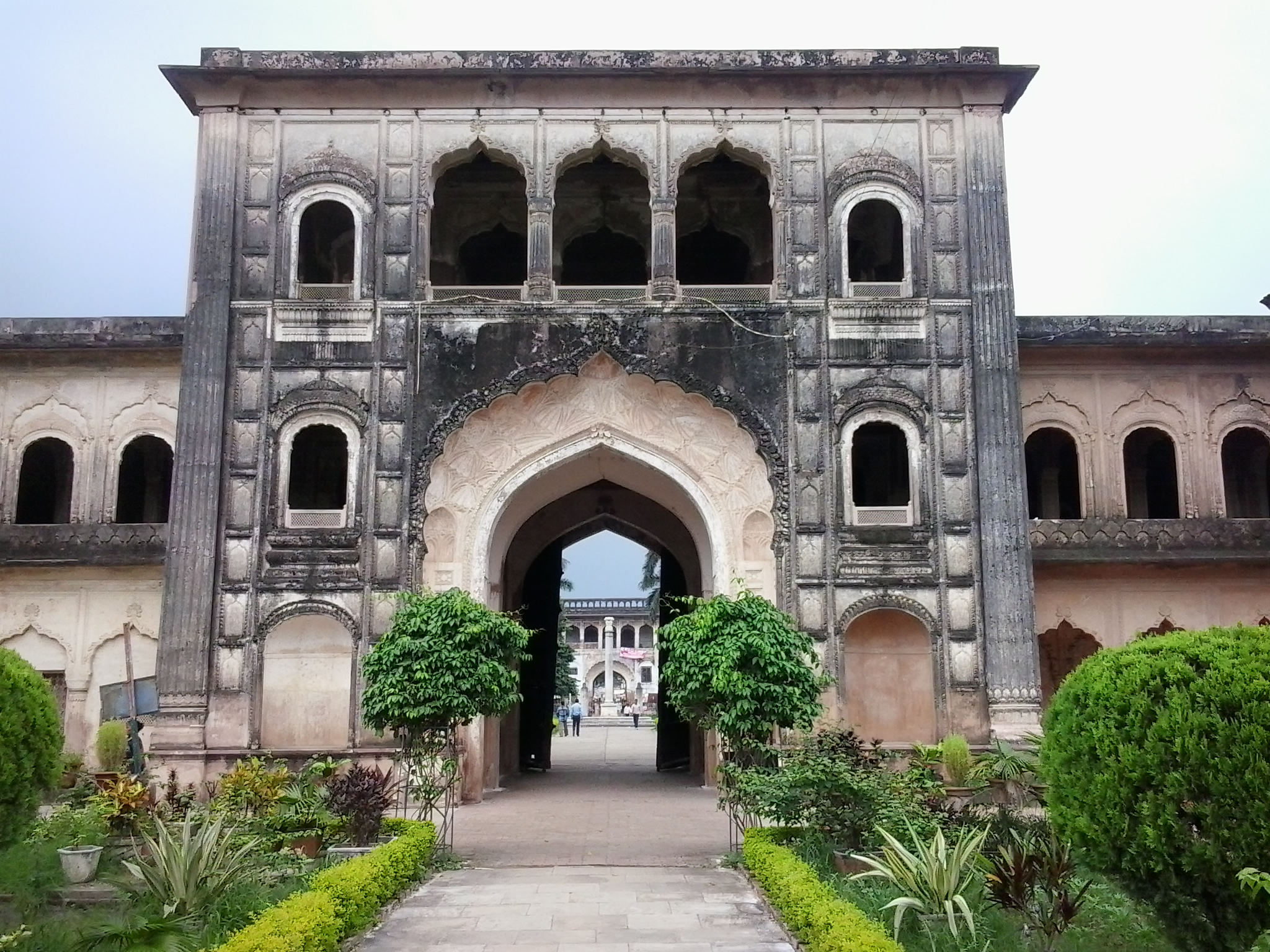

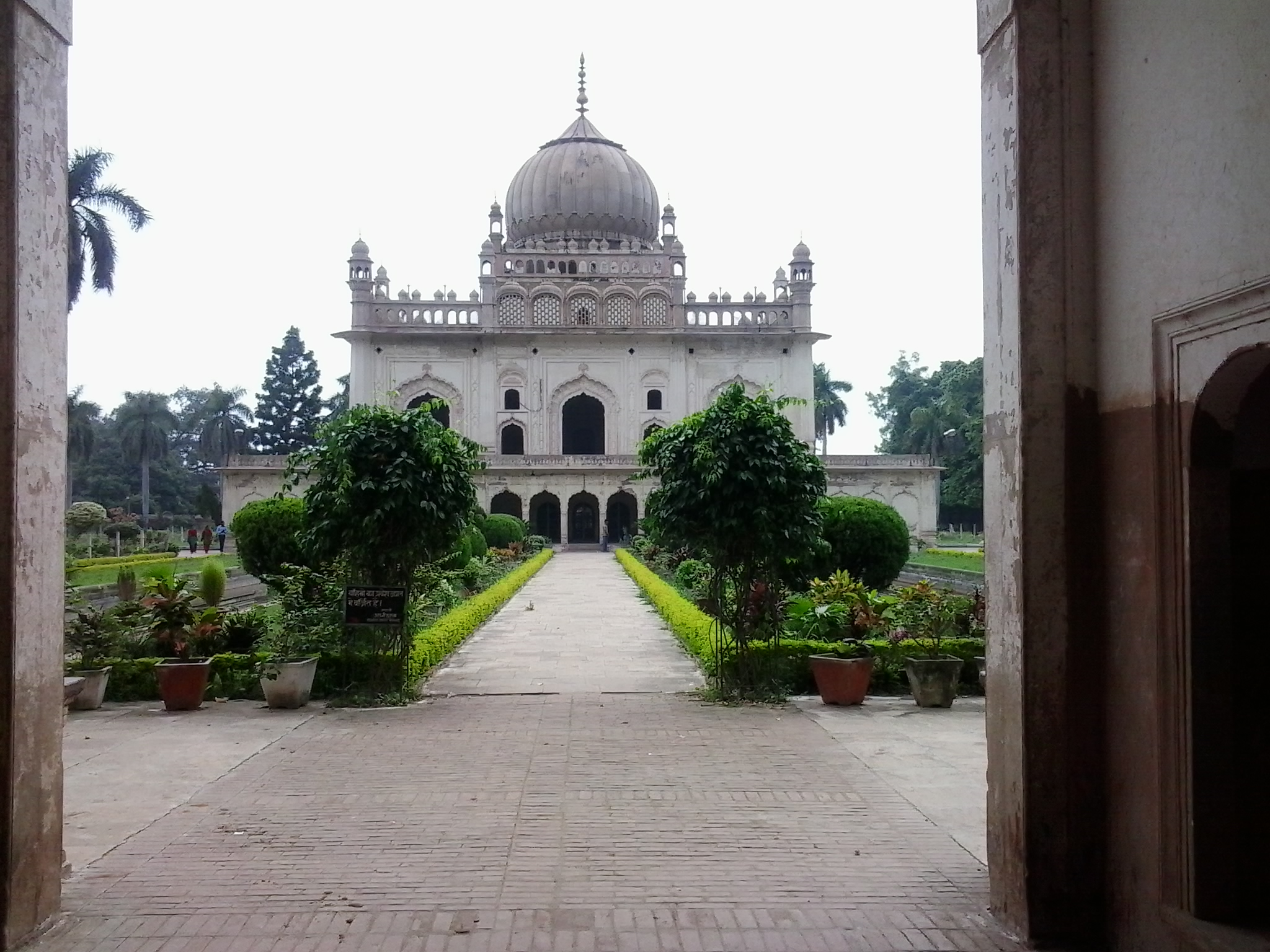

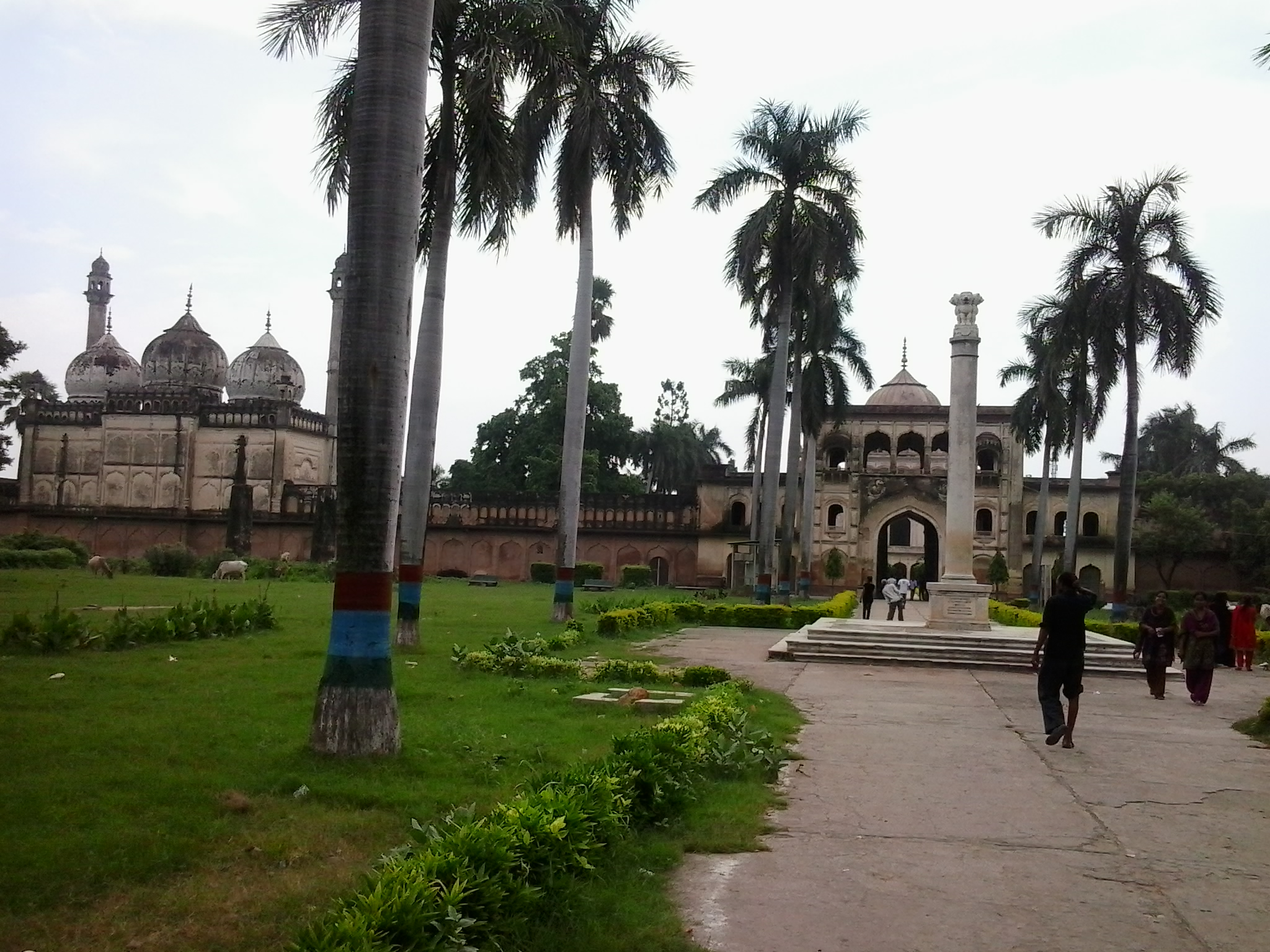

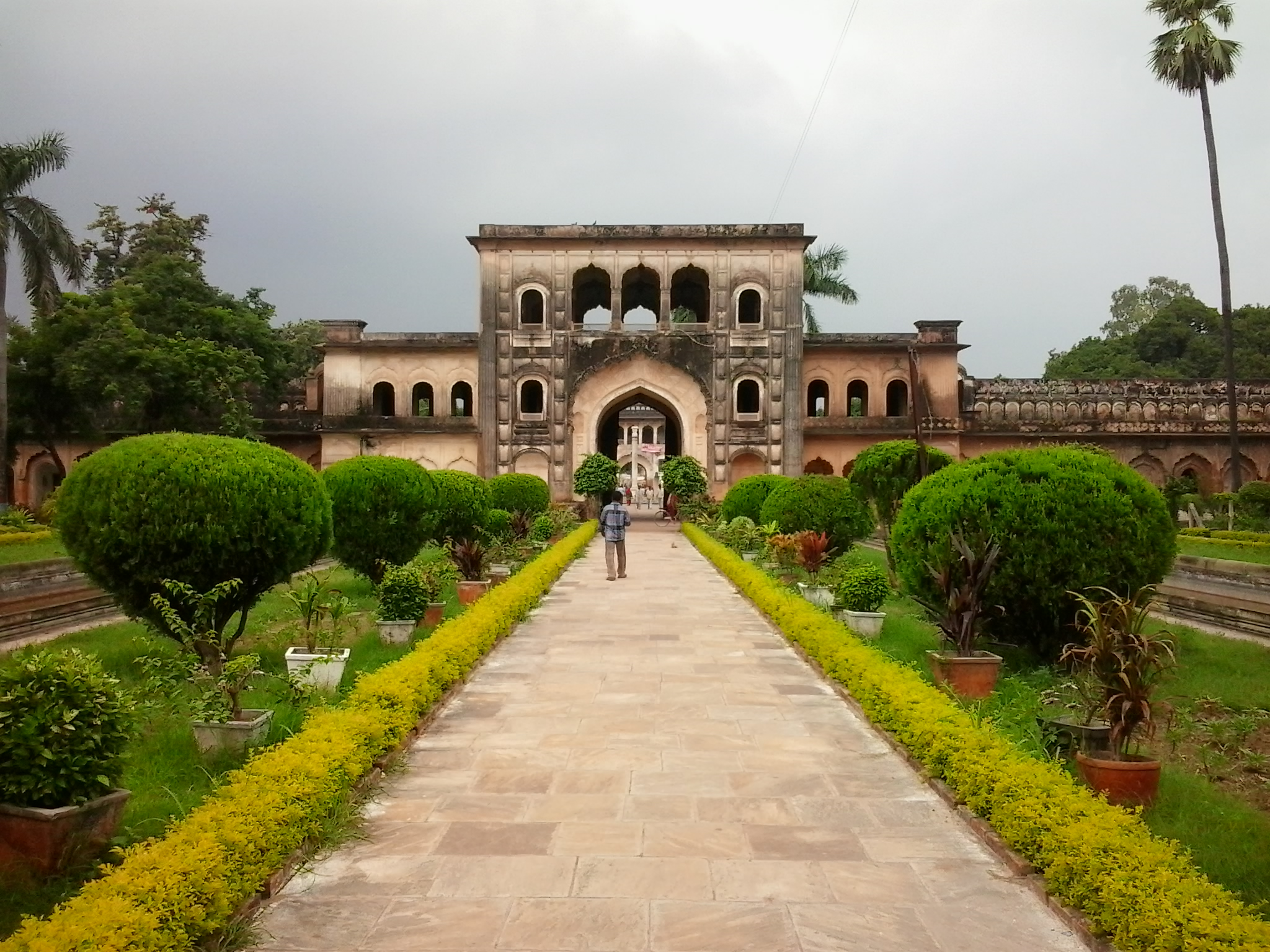

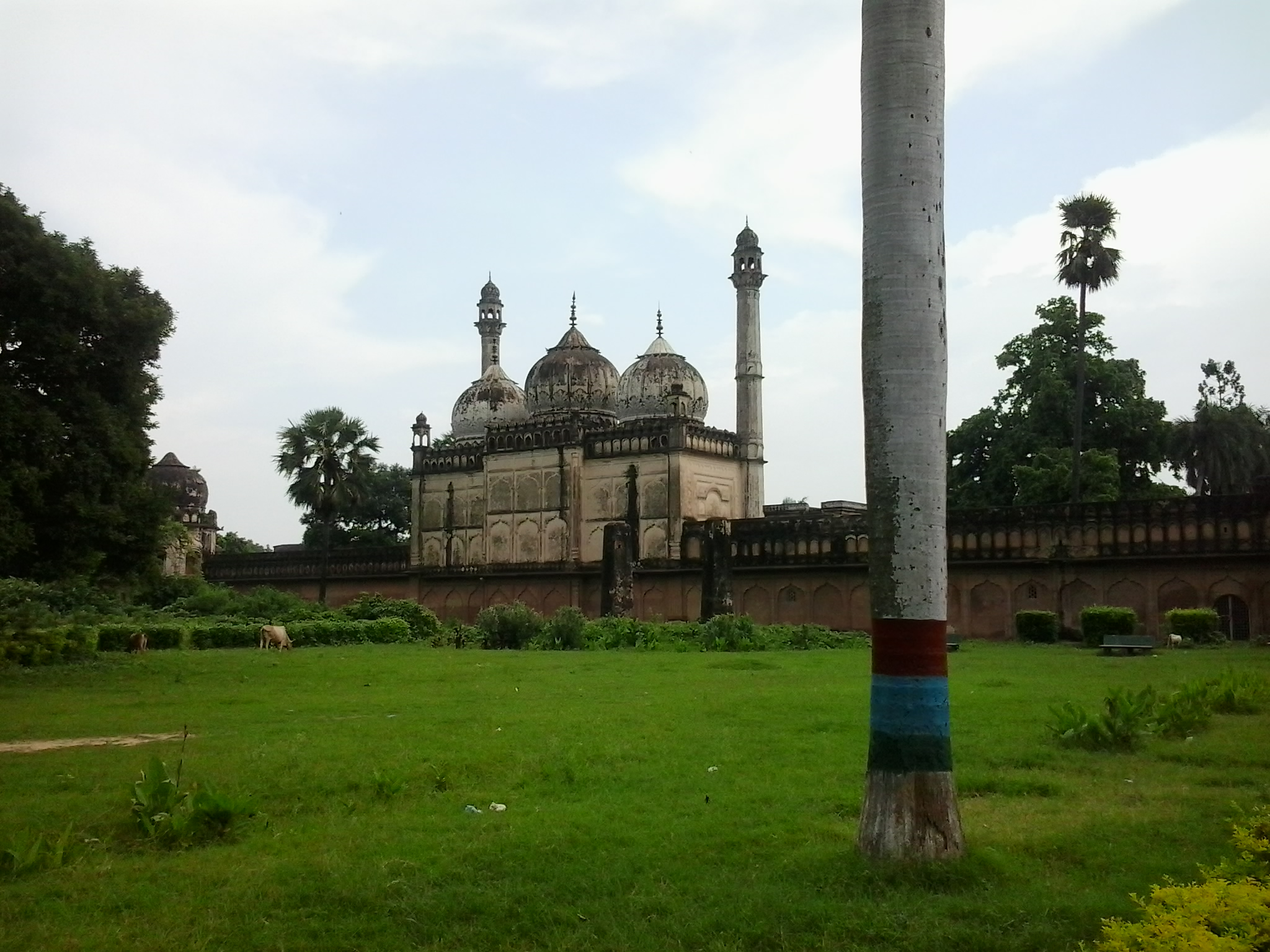

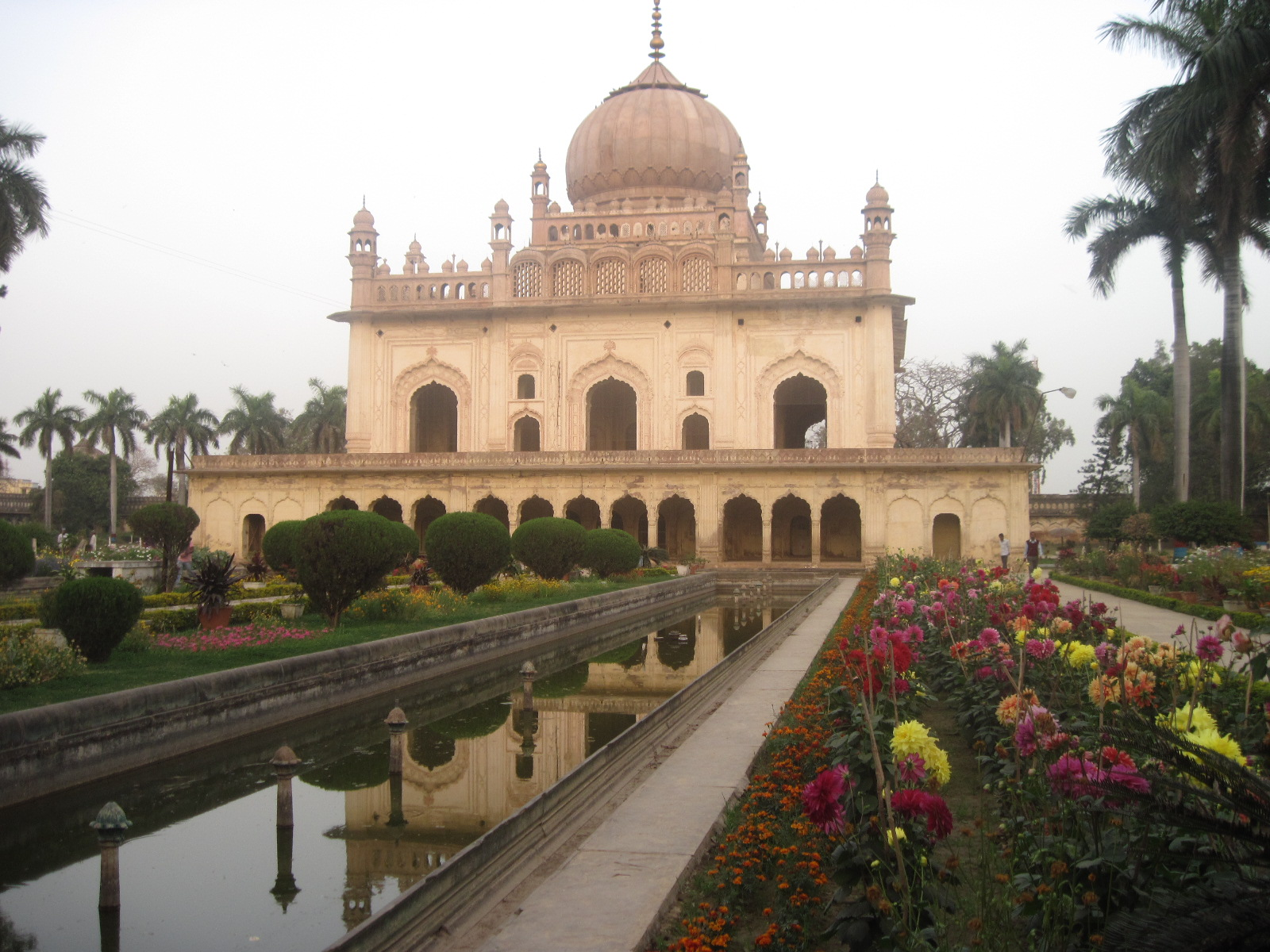

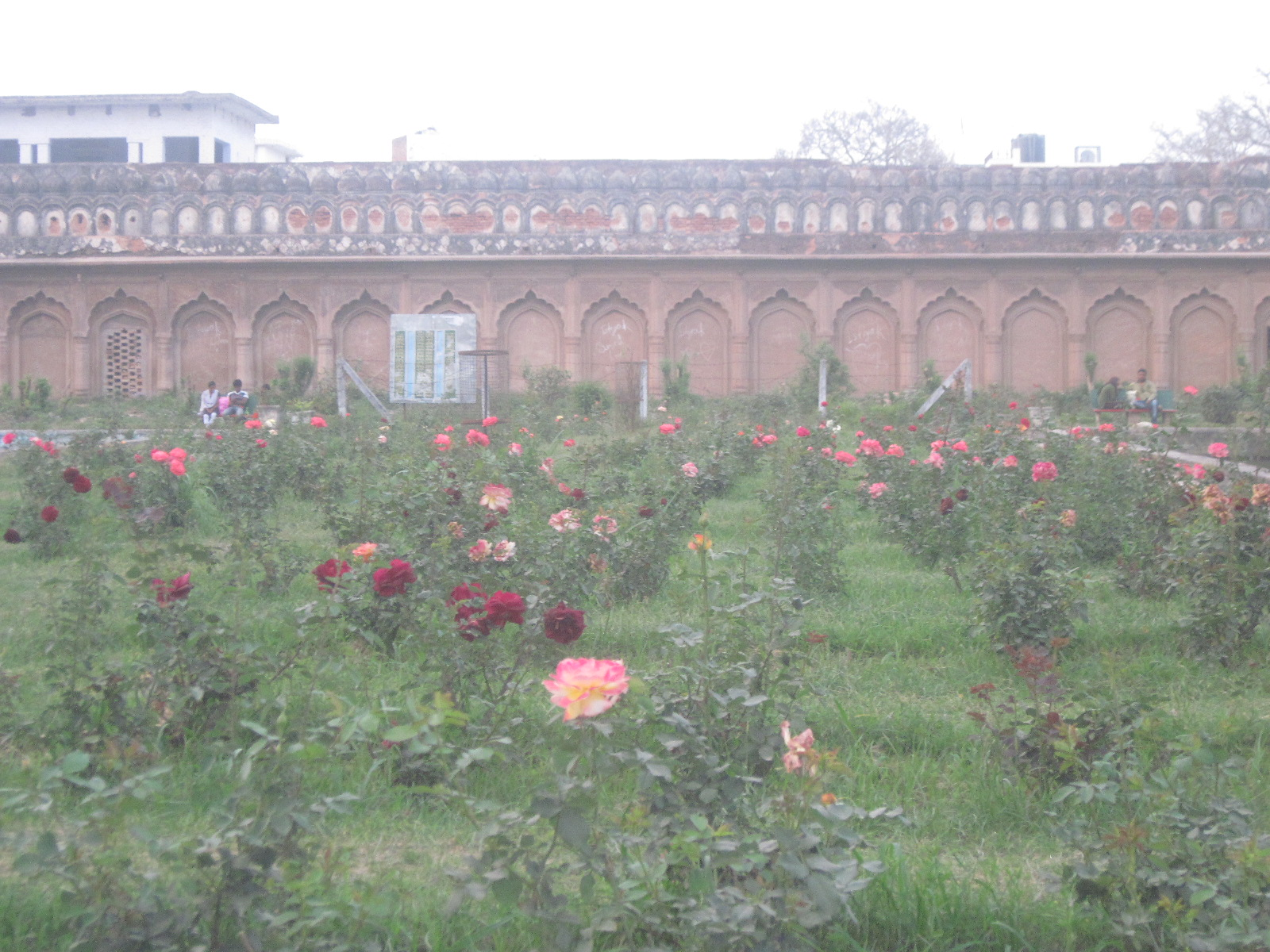
Rose Garden at Gulab Bari

Inside view of the Tomb

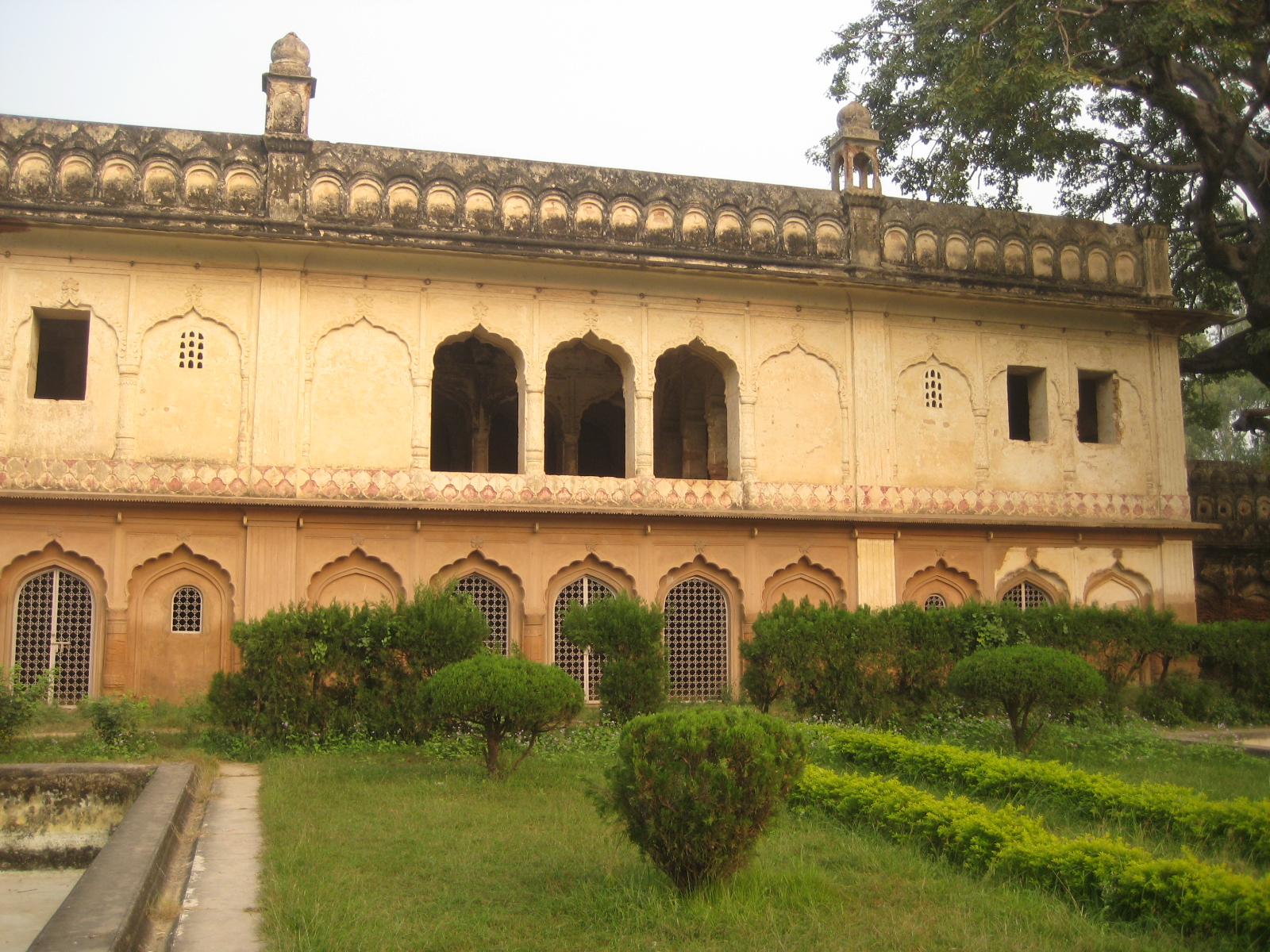
Hammam at the Gulab Bari
