= Bada Mangal =

Long festival celebrated in Lucknow, Uttar Pradesh, India

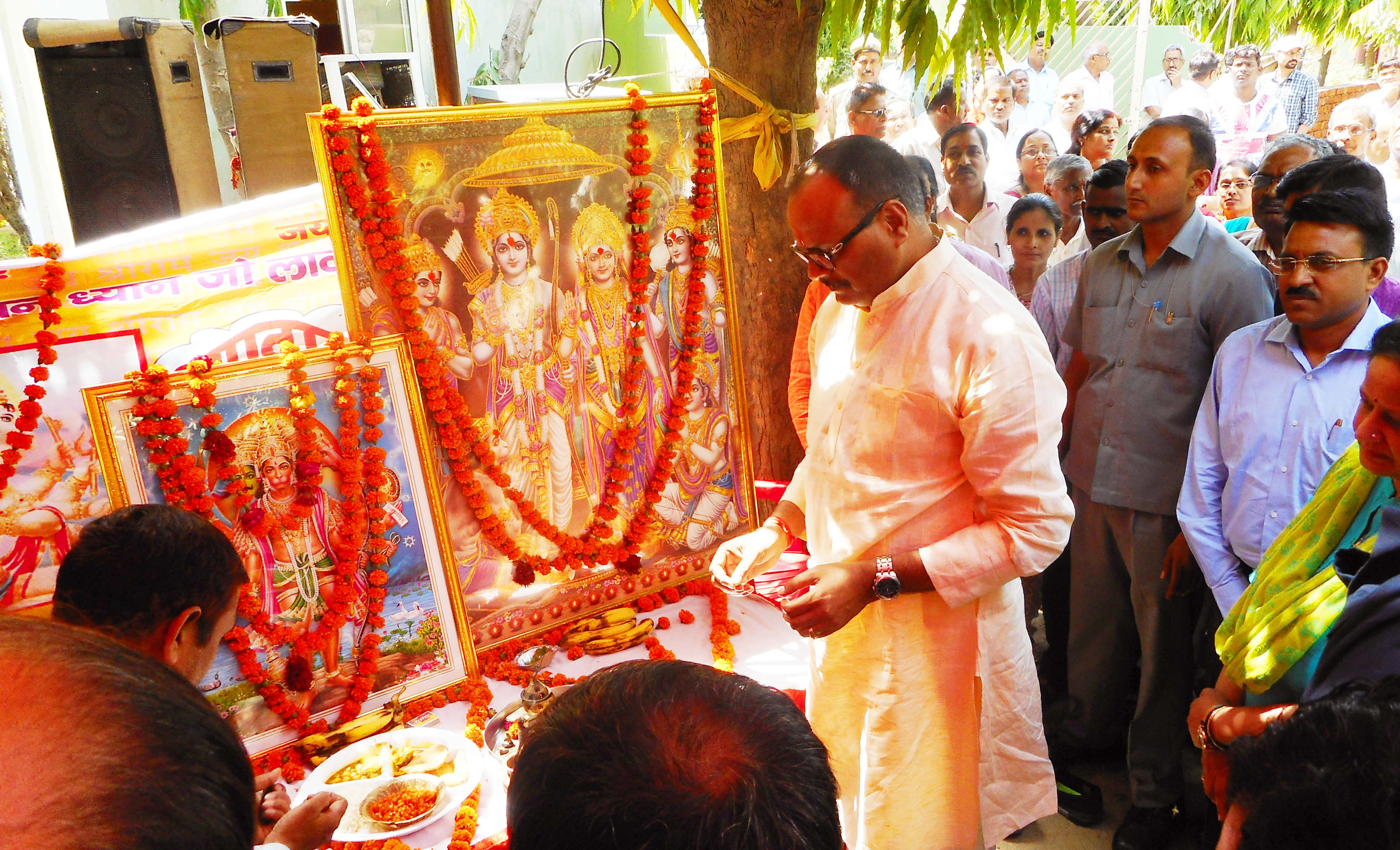
- Bada Mangal in 2017
- Genre: Religious festival
- Date: Tuesdays during Jyeshtha
- Frequency: Annual
- Locations: Lucknow, Uttar Pradesh
- Country: India

Bada Mangal, or Bada Mangalwar, is a festival dedicated to Hanuman celebrated in northern India, particularly Uttar Pradesh. It is observed every Tuesday in the Hindu month of Jyeshtha, which usually runs from May to June each year. With origins in Lucknow, Bada Mangal is seen as symbolic of the city's syncretic Hindu-Muslim culture, or Ganga-Jamuni tehzeeb. According to local tradition, dates back centuries to the era of Nawabi rule of Awadh. In Lucknow, devotees gather at the city's Hanuman temples, while people of all religions participate in bhandaras or communal feasts.

The festival is also sometimes called Budhwa Mangal, referring to an elderly form of Hanuman Ji. Although Bada Mangal usually lasts for four or five weeks, in 2026 it is being observed over eight Tuesdays due to a rare occurrence in the Hindu lunar calendar.

== Festivities ==
In Lucknow, Bada Mangal is the most prominent local festival of the year, celebrated by all Hanuman temples across the city. Among the most popular during Bada Mangal are Hindu temples in the Aliganj area of Lucknow – Purana Hanuman Mandir, which has an Islamic crescent moon (chand tara) at the top of the temple dome, and Naya Hanuman Mandir – which are regarded as central to the festival's origin story. Others include the Hanuman temples at Hanuman Setu, located opposite University of Lucknow, and Chhachhi Kuan. Long queues of devotees can be seen around the clock every Tuesday during Jyeshtha, receiving darshan and offering prasad. During Bada Mangal, a popular prayer is the 40-verse Hanuman Chalisa written by Tulsidas, who once stayed in old Lucknow on his way to Mathura in the 16th century.

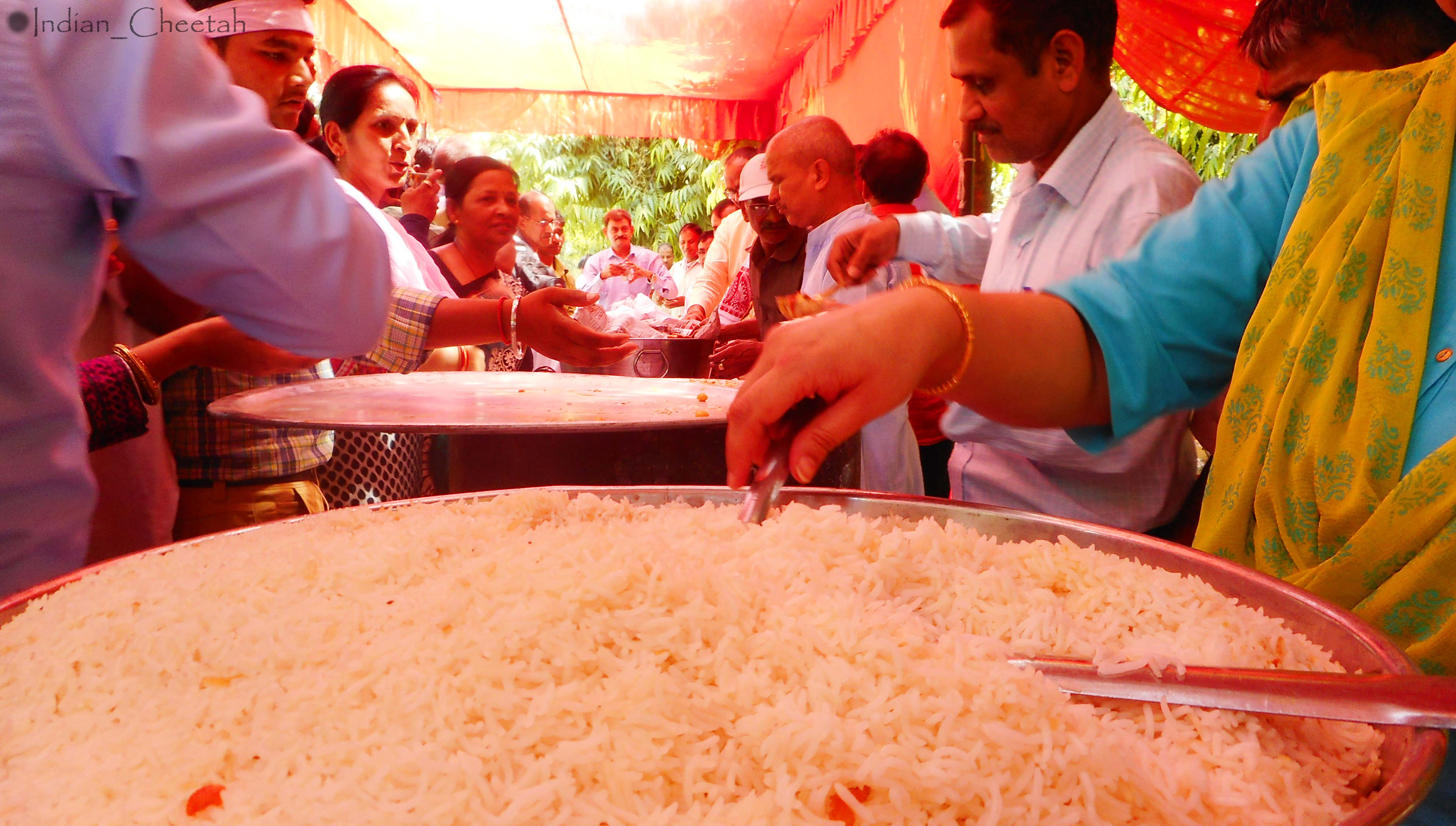
Bhandara during Bada Mangal

Festivities in Lucknow have expanded over the last 30 to 40 years. Free meals or bhandaras are distributed to large crowds of devotees each week from an estimated 3,000 food stalls. Traditionally, sharbat and puri sabzi have been the main refreshments, with Muslim residents of the city joining Hindus in serving devotees. Today the other bhandaras on offer during Bada Mangal include boondi, halva, meetha paani, ice cream, kulfi, noodles, laddoo, and many other foods. People from other faiths including Sikhs and Christians also participate in organising the communal feasts.

== Origins ==
In Hinduism, Tuesday (Mangalavara) is the day of the week that is considered the most auspicious for devotees of Lord Hanuman. The qualities of Hanuman – physical strength, courage, and selfless devotion – are closely associated with Mangala (Mars), which in astrology is associated with Tuesday. According to historians, there are many legends about the origins of Bada Mangal and its celebration. Some of these stories date back to the 18th and 19th centuries, when Lucknow emerged as the capital of Awadh, ruled by the Shia Muslim nawabs.

=== Janab-e-Alia and Mirza Mangli ===
Janab-e-Alia, the Hindu wife of the third Nawab of Awadh, Shuja-ud-Daula, is often credited with founding a Hanuman temple in Aliganj and inspiring Bada Mangal. Historians say the temple was actually built by her son Saadat Ali Khan, who became the sixth Nawab of Awadh.

According to popular folklore, in the mid-18th century, Chattar Kunwar (later known as Janab-e-Alia) was blessed with a baby boy after praying at the old Hanuman temple in Aliganj. In gratitude, she named her son Mirza Mangli (nickname Manglu), derived from the word for Tuesday. In a dream, a divine entity told her to build a new Hanuman temple, thus starting the tradition of Bada Mangal. (Her son later took the name Saadat Ali Khan.)

A variation of the story is that a divine entity led Janab-e-Alia to a site near Rahimnagar, where a statue of Hanuman was discovered buried in the earth. As the statue was being transported, the elephant carrying it suddenly stopped, sat down, and refused to move. Interpreting this as a sign, she decided that a new temple to Hanuman should be built in that exact location in Aliganj.

=== Muhammad Ali Shah ===
The origins of Bada Mangal and its traditions are also associated with Muhammad Ali Shah, the ninth Nawab of Awadh and grandfather of Wajid Ali Shah. According to the story, one of Muhammad Ali Shah's sons was cured of an illness after the divine intervention of Lord Hanuman. Proponents of this story suggest that the festival thus emerged in 19th-century Awadh as a demonstration of Ganga-Jamuni tehzeeb, the fusion of Hindu and Muslim beliefs, and an ethic of shared social responsibility.

As of 2025, descendants of Muhammad Ali Shah continue to organise bhandaras during Bada Mangal to honor their ancestral tradition and support interfaith harmony.

== See also ==
- Hanuman Jayanti, festival celebrating birth of Hanuman
