= Golaganj, Lucknow =

Golaganj (Urdu: گولہ گنج, Hindi: गोला गंज) is a neighbourhood in the city of Lucknow in the Awadh region of Uttar Pradesh, India. It is home to the famous Lucknow Christian College, Balrampur Hospital and Shahid Apartment. Gola Ganj is situated near Kaiserbagh bus station.

There are various other known landmarks in Gola ganj including:
- Lal Ji Sweets
- Sarah Marriage Hall
- Lal Masjid
- Noor-ul-Islam School
- Gulab Cinema
