= Lakshman Tamil =

Researcher

- Education: University of Rhode Island (PhD); Indian Institute of Technology (MTech); Madurai Kamaraj University (BE)
- Occupations: Researcher; Professor
- Scientific career
- Workplaces: University of Texas at Dallas

Lakshman Tamil is a researcher and professor known for his contributions to the fields of wireless communication, telemedicine, machine learning, and quality of life technology. He is also known for his role as a director of University of Texas at Dallas' Quality of Life Labs and advancements in AI for cancer screening.

== Career ==
Tamil has supported or founded several companies for translating research into commercial application. He has been involved with startups including Yotta Networks, Spike Technologies, HygeiaTel, and MedCognetics.

== Awards and honours ==
- 2020, Fellow of the National Academy of Inventors
