= Shuja-ud-Daula =

Nawab of Awadh from 1754 to 1775

- Nawab of Oudh; Khan Bahadur; Asad Jang; Arsh Manzil
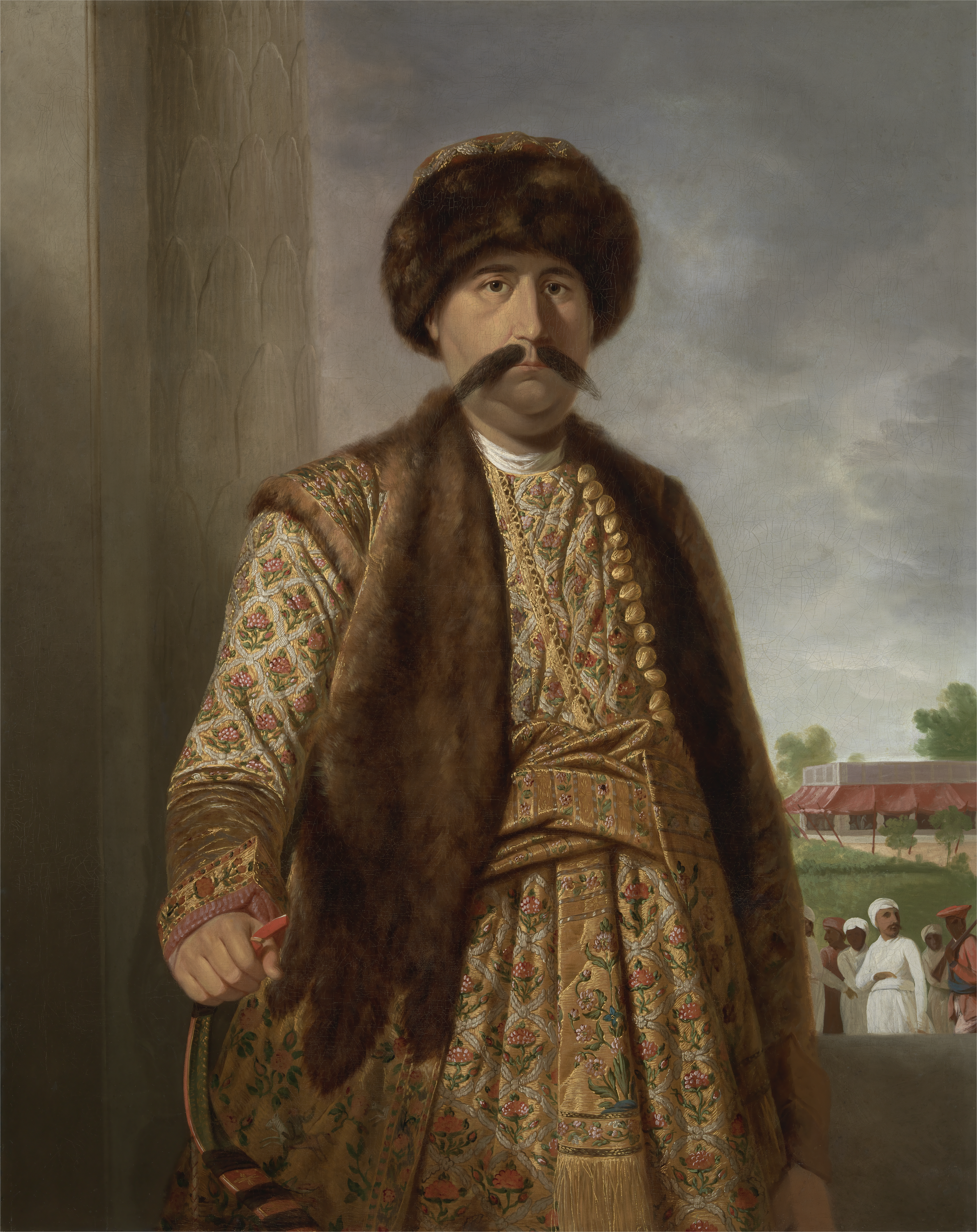
- Portrait by Tilly Kettle, 1772

3rd Nawab of Awadh
- Reign: 5 October 1754 – 26 January 1775
- Predecessor: Safdar Jang
- Successor: Asaf-ud-Daulah
- Born: 19 January 1732; Mansion of Dara Shikoh, Delhi, Delhi Subah, Mughal Empire
- Died: 26 January 1775 (aged 43); Faizabad, Kingdom of Awadh (present-day Uttar Pradesh, India)
- Burial: Gulab Bari, Faizabad, Awadh
- Spouse: Nawab Begum Ummat-uz-Zahra Bano "Bahu Begum" Saheba; Chattar Kunwar "Janab-e-Alia"
- Issue: Asaf-ud-Daulah; Saadat Ali Khan II
Names
- Jalal-ud-din Haider Abul Mansur Khan Shuja-ud-Daula
- House: Nishapuri
- Dynasty: Qara Qoyunlu
- Father: Safdar Jang
- Mother: Nawab Begum Sadar Jahan Ara Begum Saheba

Shuja-ud-Daula (19 January 1732 – 26 January 1775) was the third Nawab of Oudh and the Vizier of Delhi from 5 October 1754 until his death on 26 January 1775.

He was a key 18th-century Mughal ally who despised the Maratha-backed grand vizier of the Mughal Empire, Imad-ul-Mulk. He supported Prince Ali Gauhar (later Shah Alam II) against Mughal usurpers and became Grand Vizier. His army, backed by influential clans and Shi'a migrants from Kashmir, was a major force in North India. Shuja joined Ahmad Shah Durrani in the Third Battle of Panipat, helping defeat the Marathas by cutting their supply lines. Later, he allied with Shah Alam II and Mir Qasim to fight the British in the Battle of Buxar but was defeated. In 1765, he signed the Treaty of Allahabad, ceding territory and financial control to the East India Company. Though strategic, this marked the start of increasing British dominance in India.

== Early life ==
Shuja-ud-Daula was the son of the Mughal Grand Vizier Safdarjung, who was chosen by Emperor Ahmad Shah Bahadur. Unlike his father Shuja-ud-Daula was known from an early age for his abilities to synthesize his subordinates; this skill would eventually cause him to emerge as the chosen Grand Vizier of Shah Alam II.

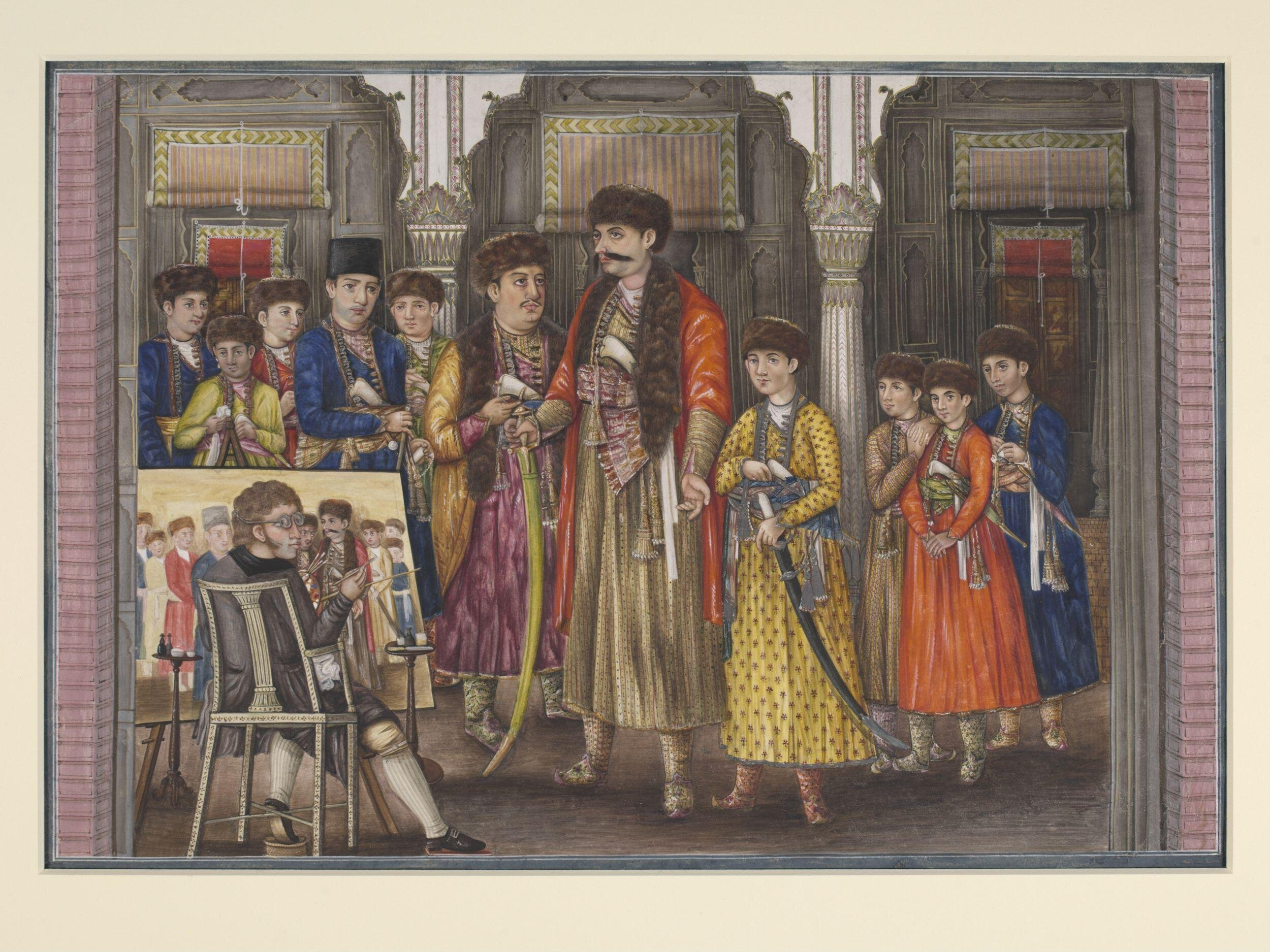
Painting a portrait of Shuja ud-Daula and his ten sons

Shuja-ud-Daula is also known to have assisted Alivardi Khan, Nawab of Bengal, on various occasions when the territories of the latter were being ravaged by Raghoji I Bhonsle and his Marathas. Thus, Shuja-ud-Daula is known to have been a very respected figure among the servicemen of Alivardi Khan.

== Nawab of Awadh ==
After the death of his father in the year 1753, Shuja-ud-Daula was recognized as the next Nawab by Ahmad Shah Bahadur.

Shuja-ud-Daula despised Imad-ul-Mulk, an ally of the Marathas whose regime emerged after the Battle of Sikandarabad with the support of the Sadashivrao Bhau. Imad-ul-Mulk blinded Ahmad Shah Bahadur and placed Alamgir II on the Mughal throne. Alamgir II and his son Prince Ali Gauhar were often persecuted by Imad-ul-Mulk because they refused to abandon their peaceful terms with Ahmad Shah Durrani; they also demanded the resignation of Imad-ul-Mulk, mainly due to his relations with the Marathas.

Shuja-ud-Daulah's household cavalry was composed of the Sheikhzadi, much of whom belonged to the Qidwai clan, who claimed descent from the Bani Israil. Clan-groups such as the Sayyids of Bilgram, Kara-Manikpur, Sheikhs of Kakori, and the Sayyids of Barha served as court officers and soldiers. The troops of Naval Rai, the most vigilant of Shuja-ud-Daulah's commanders, were a contingent of his Barah Sayyids, while the Bilgramis were of the same stock. These clans had not taken any profession other than soldiery. Shuja-ud-Daulah's father had maintained a contingent of 20,000 "Mughal" cavalry, who were mainly Hindustanis, many of whom were chiefly from the Jadibal district in Kashmir and who imitated the Qizilbash in dress and spoke the Persian language. The state also saw a large migration of Kashmiri Shi'as to the Shi'a kingdom of Awadh, both to escape persecution and to secure courtly patronage. This was especially the case with men from the district of Jadibal in Kashmir, who were all Shias, who looked to the state as the sword-arm of the Shi'as in India.

== Grand Vizier of the Mughal Empire ==
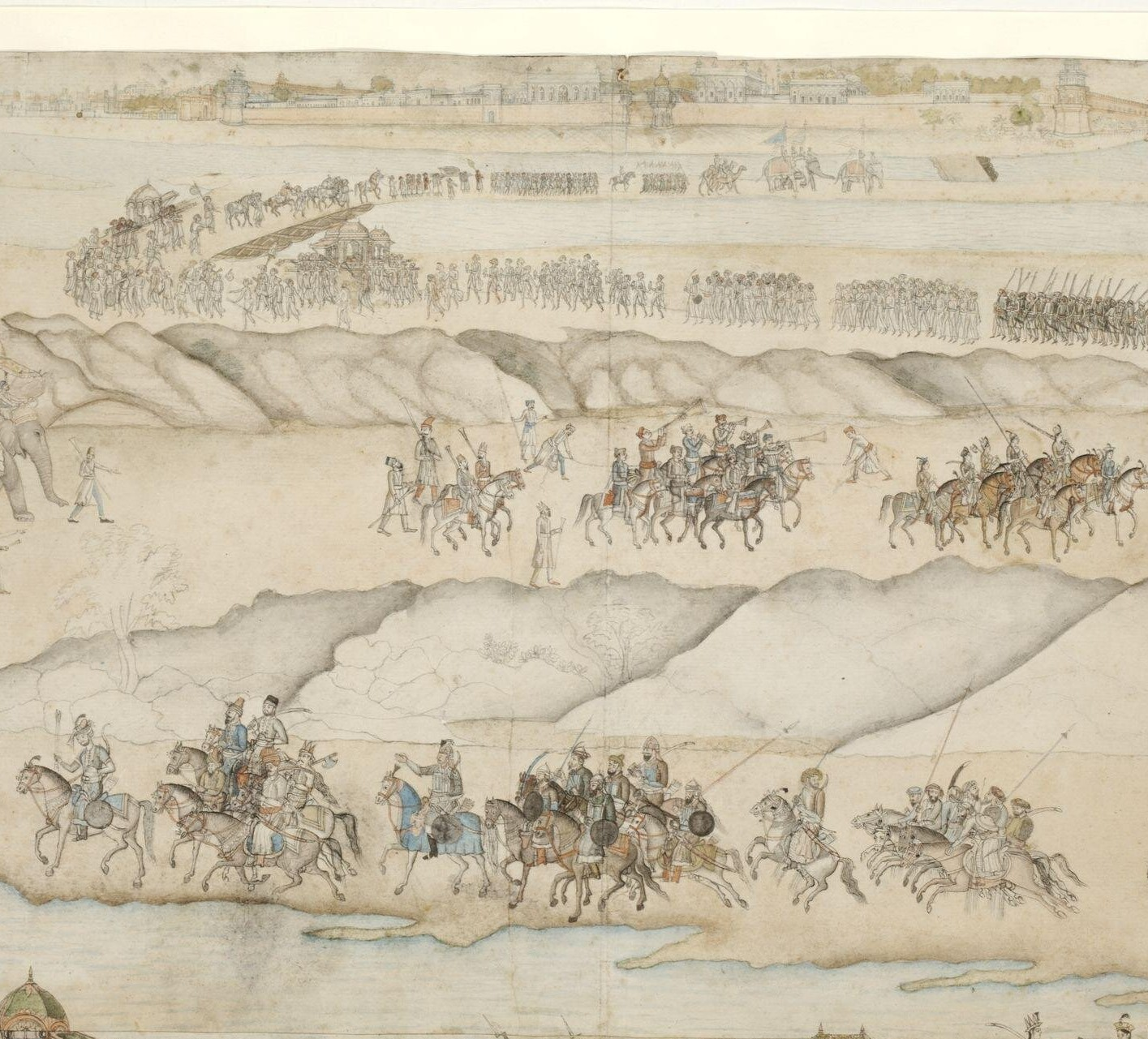
Escort of Shah Alam II returning from the Treaty of Allahabad

Prince Ali Gauhar fled from Delhi when he realized a conspiracy that would eventually lead to the murder of the Mughal emperor Alamgir II. Shuja-ud-Daula welcomed and protected Prince Ali Gauhar, who then declared himself Shah Alam II and officially recognized Shuja-ud-Daula as the Grand Vizier of the Mughal Empire. Together they challenged the usurper Shah Jahan III, who was placed on the Mughal imperial throne by Sadashivrao Bhau and his forces, which plundered much of the Mughal Empire.

Shah Alam II was then advised to lead an expedition that would attempt to retake the eastern regions of the Mughal Empire from Mir Jafar who was supported by the British East India Company. While Shuja-ud-Daula, Najib-ud-Daula and Mirza Jawan Bakht allied themselves with Ahmad Shah Durrani and assisted his forces during the Second Battle of Sikandarabad in the year 1760 and later led a Mughal Army of 43,000 during the Third Battle of Panipat.

=== Third Battle of Panipat ===
After escaping from Delhi due to the murder of his father the Mughal Emperor Alamgir II, the young Prince Ali Gauhar was well received by Shuja-ud-Daula. The Nawab of Awadh and the newly appointed Mughal Grand Vizier Shuja-ud-Daula assured Prince Ali Gauhar that he and Najib-ud-Daula would initiate a struggle that would overthrow the Maratha Empire if Prince Ali Gauhar would lead what remained of the Mughal Army against the expanding British East India Company in Bengal.

Shuja's decision about whom to join as an ally in the Third Battle of Panipat was one of the decisive factors that determined the outcome of the war as lack of food due to the Afghans cutting the supply lines of Marathas was one of the reasons that the Marathas could not sustain the day-long battle. Their forces were weak due to starvation and were also fighting facing the sun.

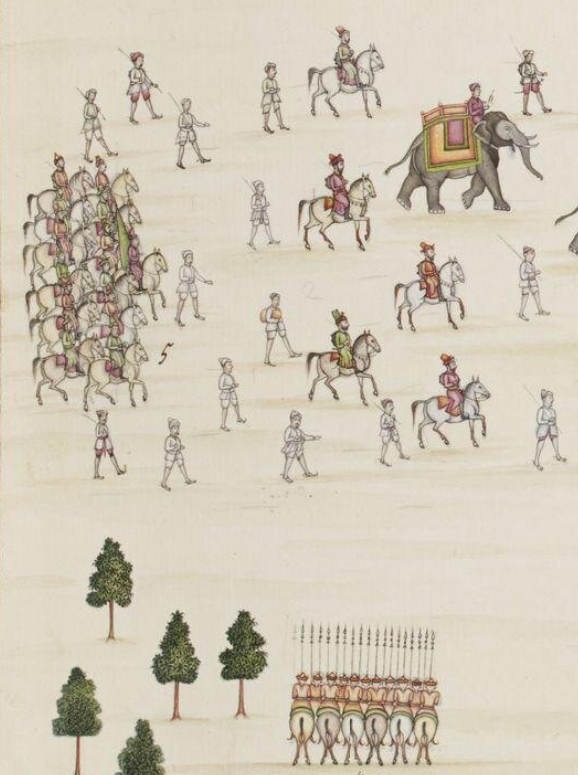
Shuja-ud-Daulah's camp, meeting with Colonel John Carnac who would go on to defeat the former in 1761

Shuja was not very sure about whose side should he take before the Third Battle of Panipat. The Marathas were still further south then and it would have taken them considerable time to reach Shuja's province. In spite of this, his mother was of the opinion that he should join the Marathas as they had helped his father previously on numerous occasions. However, in the end, Shuja decided to join Ahmad Shah Durrani.

As the chosen Grand Vizier of the Mughal Empire, Shuja-ud-Daula commanded a sizeable army of Mughal Sepoy, who cut off the supplies of the Marathas and even defeated them in pitched confrontations during the Third Battle of Panipat and dispatched the Maratha leader Sadashivrao Bhau.

Abdali wrote to Shuja-ud-Daulah:

"It is now incontestably known that the addressee is a native of those parts, but that forsaking the conversation and manners of his native land, he has incorporated himself with the inhabitants of Hindustan. Whatever has come to pass, is altogether right. Whatever has been has been; the future will, by the favour of God, be fortunate.

=== Battle of Buxar ===
Shuja is also known for his role in the Battle of Buxar, a battle that was no less definite in Indian history. He along with the forces of Mughal emperor Shah Alam II & Mir Qasim ruler of Bengal were defeated by the British forces in one of the key battles in the history of British East India company.

=== Allahabad Treaty ===
He again fought the British with the help of Marathas at Kara Jahanabad and was defeated. On 16 August 1765 AD he signed the Treaty of Allahabad, which said that Kora and Allahabad district would go to Company and the Company would get 5 million rupees from Awadh. The British would be allowed free trade in Awadh and would help each other in case of war with other powers, which was a very shrewd political move by the Company.

To pay for the protection of British forces and assistance in war, Awadh gave up first the fort of Chunar, then districts of Benaras, Ghazipur and finally Allahabad.

== Death and burial ==
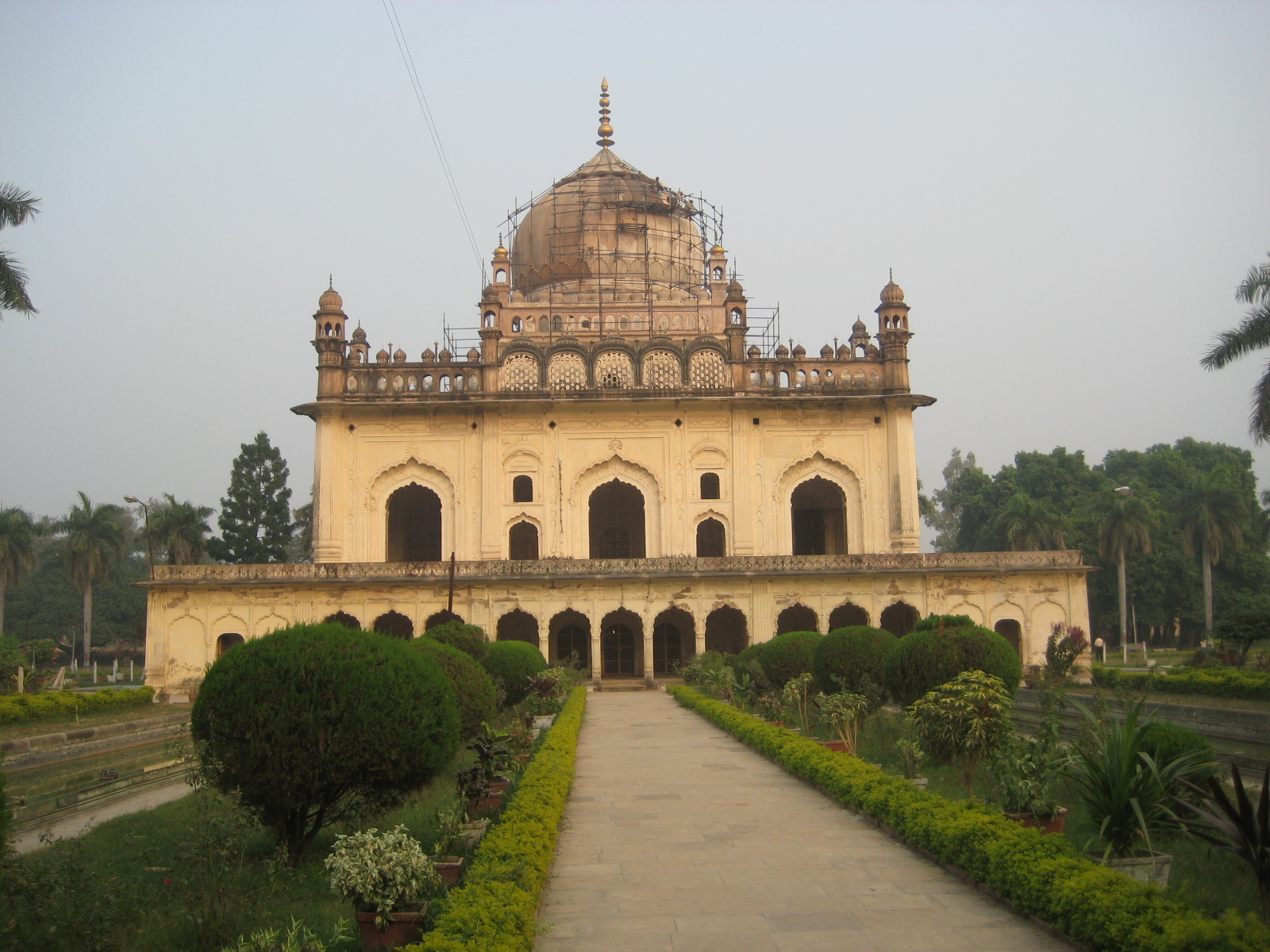
Gulab Bari, the tomb of Shuja-ud-Daula, in Faizabad

Shuja-ud-Daula died on 26 January 1775 in Faizabad, the then capital of Awadh, and was buried in the same city. His burial place is a tomb and known as Gulab Bari (Rose Garden).

== Personal life ==
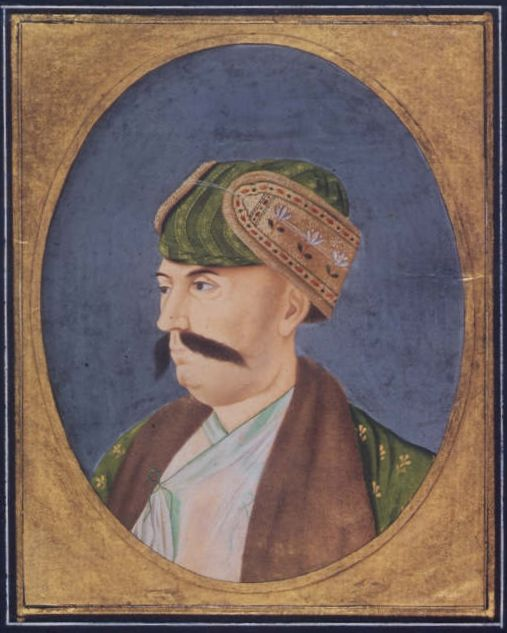
A portrait of Shuja ud-Daulah

According to historians, Shuja-ud-Daulah was nearly seven feet tall, with oiled moustaches that projected from his face like a pair of outstretched eagle’s wings, he was a man of immense physical strength. By 1763, he was past his prime, but still reputedly strong enough to cut off the head of a buffalo with a single swing of his sword, or lift up two of his officers, one in each hand. This was something that immediately struck the 18th-century, historian Ghulam Hussain Khan who regarded him as a slight liability, every bit as foolish as he was bold. Shuja, he wrote, ‘was equally proud and ignorant’.

== In popular culture ==
- In the 1994 Hindi TV series The Great Maratha, Shuja's character was portrayed by Benjamin Gilani.
- In the 2019 Bollywood film Panipat, Shuja-ud-Daula is portrayed by Kunal Kapoor.

== Gallery ==
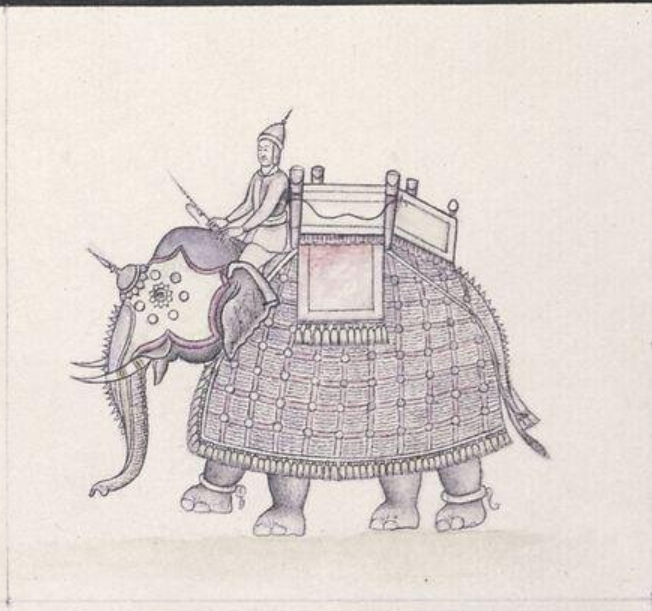
Mahout of Shuja-ud-Daulah, 1772

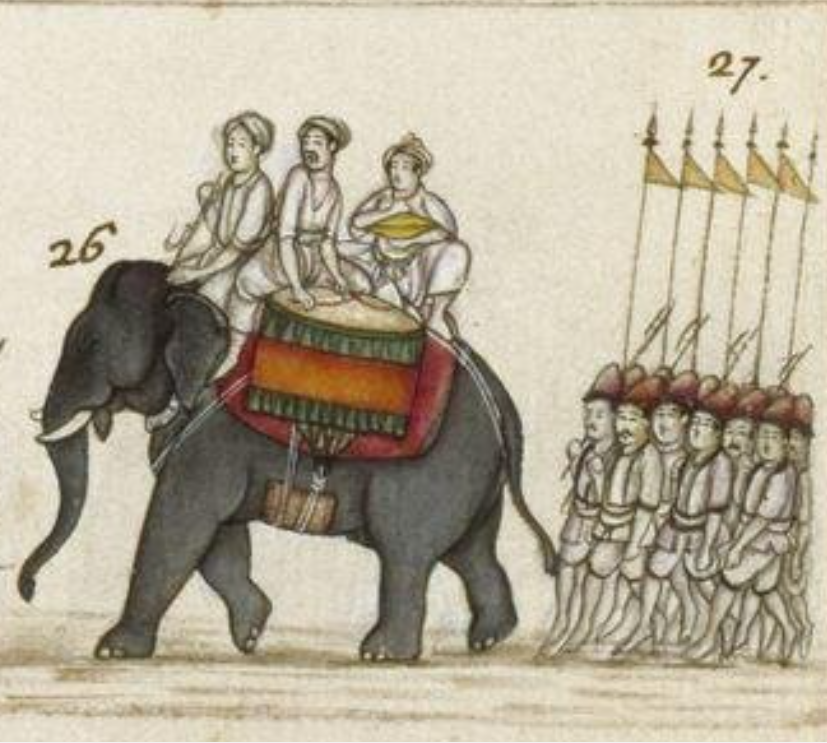
Muharram Procession, Faizabad, 1722

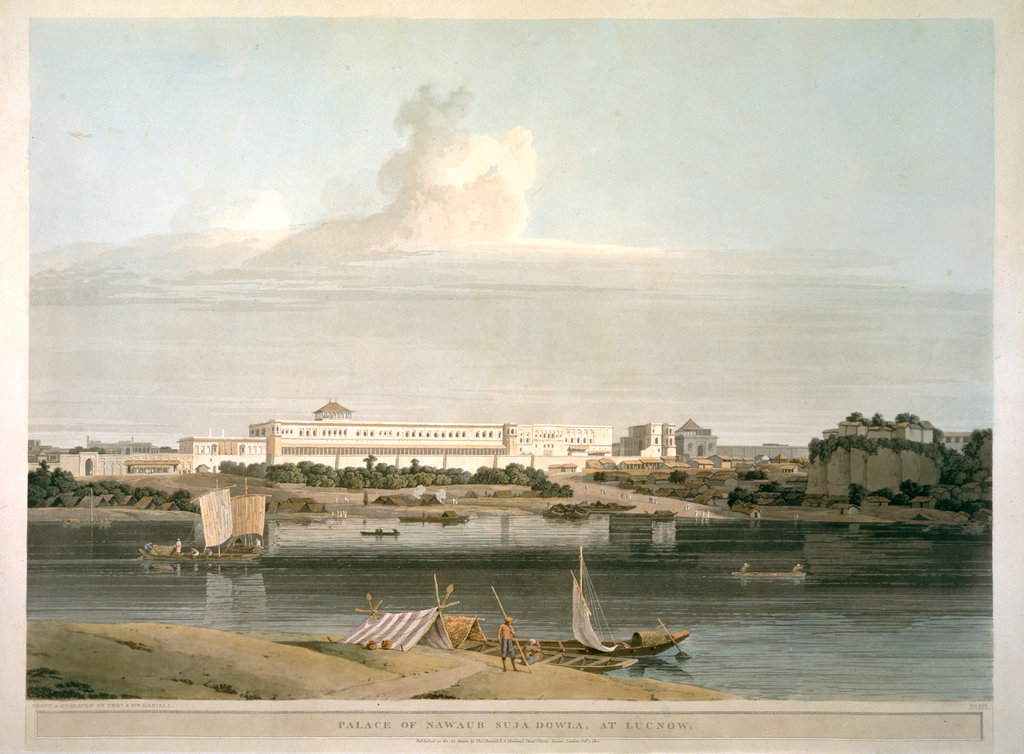
Palace of Nawab Shuja-ud-Daula at Lucknow

Preceded by Abu´l Mansur Mohammad Moqim Khan	Subadar Nawab of Oudh; 1754–1762	Succeeded by post abolished
Preceded by new creation	Nawab Wazir al-Mamalik of Oudh; 1762–1775	Succeeded by Asaf ad-Dowla Amani
