= Aliganj =

- town
- Nickname: City of plum
- Location in Uttar Pradesh, India Aliganj (India)
- Coordinates: 27.5°N 79.18°E
- Country: India
- State: Uttar Pradesh
- District: Etah

Government
  - Type: BJP
  - Body: Municipal Board
  - Chairperson: Suneeta Gupta

Area
  - Total: 4,446 km^{2} (1,717 sq mi)
- Elevation: 154 m (505 ft)

Population (2011)
  - Total: 28,396
  - Density: 6.387/km^{2} (16.54/sq mi)

Languages
  - Official: Hindi
- Time zone: UTC+5:30 (IST)
- Postal code: 207247
- Telephone code: 05742
- Vehicle registration: UP-82
- Website: etah.nic.in

Aliganj is a town and a municipal board in the Etah district of Uttar Pradesh, India. C.K. Sethi, the former Agriculture Chairman of India and a former Member of Parliament, belonged to this city. The official name of Aliganj is Pargana Azamnagar. Suneeta Gupta is the current Chairperson of Nagar Palika Parishad Aliganj.

== Geography ==
Aliganj is located at 27.5°N 79.18°E and has an average elevation of 154 metres (505 ft). The nearest cities to Aliganj include Sarai Aghat, Etah, Khair, Kaimganj, Jaithra, Dhumari, Kampil, Amoghpur Bhrahmanan, Farrukhabad, and Aligarh.

== Demographics ==
As of the 2011 India Census, Aliganj had a population of 28,396. Males constitute 53% of the population, while females make up 47%. Aliganj has an average literacy rate of 72%, which is higher than the national average of 59.5%. Among the literate population, 60% are males and 40% are females. Additionally, 15% of the population is under 8 years of age.

== Famous For ==
Aliganj is famous for its plums, earning it the nickname "City of Plums."

== Villages ==
- Daheliya Pooth Aliyapur
