= Bahu Begum =

Chief consort and queen mother of Awadh

- Jenab Aliya Muta-aliya
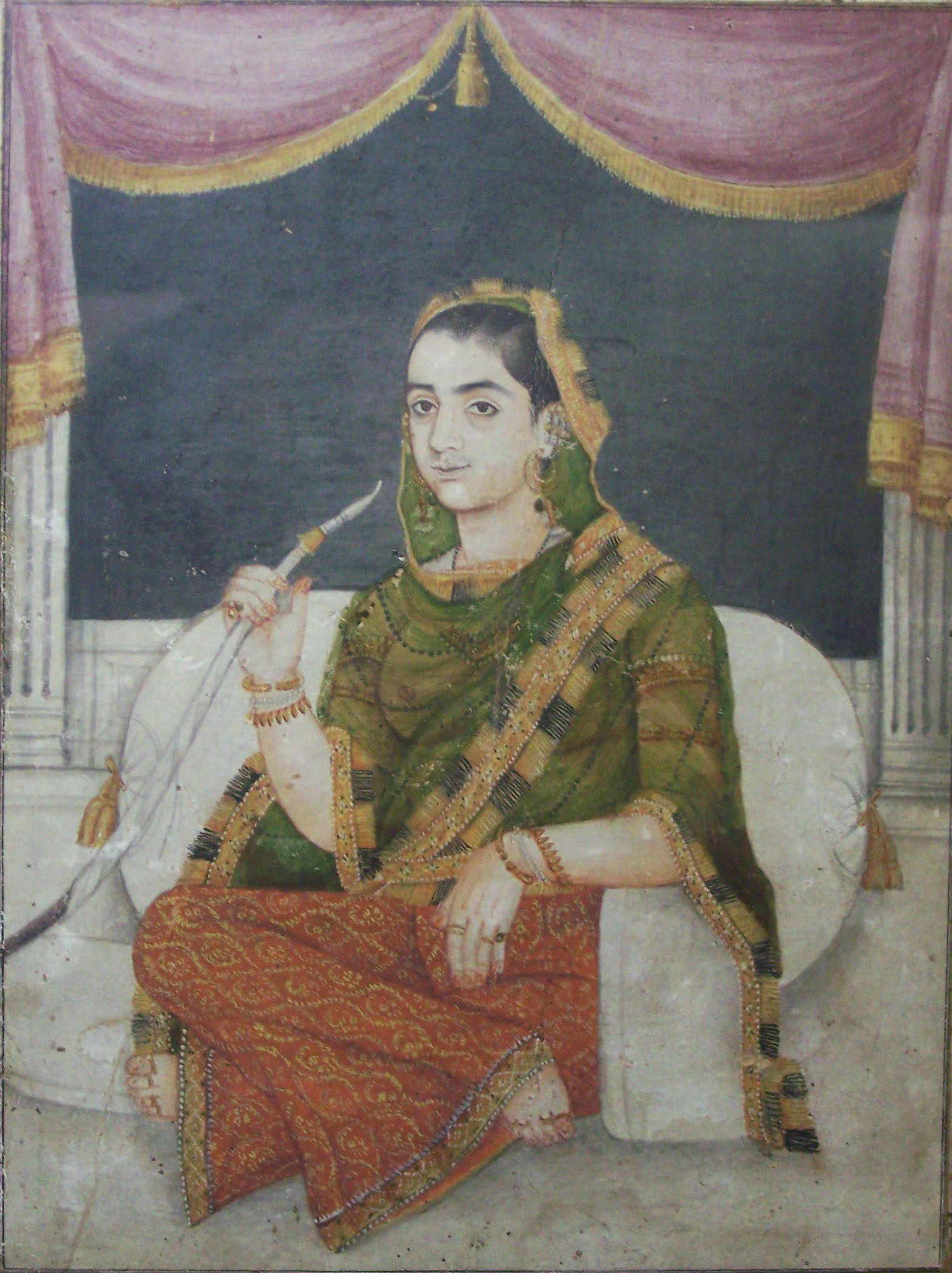
- Portrait in Lucknow State Museum

Chief consort of the Nawab of Oudh
- Tenure: 1745–26 January 1775

Queen mother of Oudh
- Tenure: 26 January 1775–21 September 1797
- Predecessor: Begum Sadar Jahan Ara Begum Saheba
- Born: Umat-ul-Zohra; Ummat-uz-Zahra; 1727
- Died: 1815 (aged 87–88)
- Spouse: Shuja-ud-Daula
- Issue: Asaf-ud-Daula
- Dynasty: Qara Qoyunlu (by marriage)

Umat-ul-Zohra Begum (1727–1815), popularly known as Bahu Begum, was the chief consort of Shuja-ud-Daula, the third Nawab of Awadh in northern India. She was an influential political figure in Awadh during his reign and after his death, when her only son, Asaf-ud-Daula, succeeded him. Bahu Begum controlled several jagirs which she governed through a network of officials. Her palace was Moti Mahal in Faizabad. Her tomb, Bahu Begum ka Maqbara, is also in Faizabad.

== Early life and marriage ==
Born in 1727, Umat-ul-Zohra was the daughter of Muhammad Ishaq Khan, a prominent Iranian noble in the Mughal court of Delhi and governor of Gujarat. Both her father and brother Najm-ud-Daula were close to the emperor Muhammad Shah. After the death of her father, the emperor adopted her as a foster daughter and negotiated her marriage to the son of nawab Safdar Jang.

In 1745, she married Jalal-ud-Din Haidar, later known as Shuja-ud-Daula. Their wedding was the second most expensive in the history of the Mughal Empire, after that of prince Dara Shikoh the century prior. Including the dowry and other gifts exchanged between families, it was reputed to have cost nearly 5 million rupees. Bahu Begum herself received cash, jewels, and other assets which became her personal property, and gained control of several jagirs.

Shuja-ud-Daula succeeded his father as nawab in 1754. While Bahu Begum was the khass mahal or chief consort and his only wife married by nikah, he went on to have more "lesser" wives than any of the nawabs of Awadh before or after his reign. During his lifetime, there were some 2,700 women living in his harem, at least 700 of whom were his wives. He was said to view his marriage to Bahu Begum as one of political expediency, until his defeat in the Battle of Buxar, which was the turning point in their relationship.

== Influence in politics ==
Modern historians consider Bahu Begum a politically skilled power broker. Although she was illiterate, she became an effective administrator, using her network of trusted eunuch officials from the harem.

=== Relationship with Shuja-ud-Daula ===
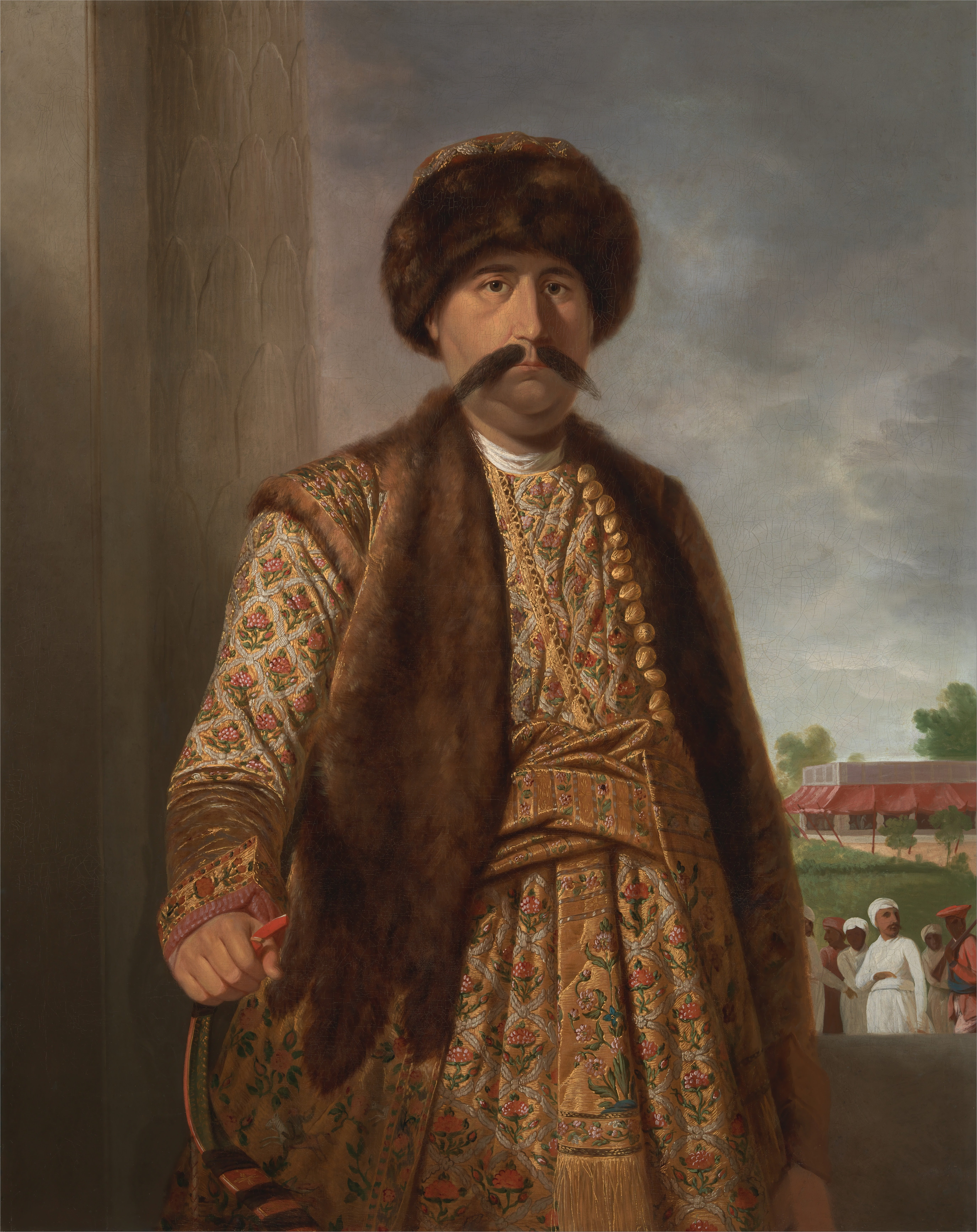
Shuja-ud-Daula portrait by Tilly Kettle

Bahu Begum earned the trust of Shuja-ud-Daula by supporting him after his military defeat in the Battle of Buxar. The 1765 Treaty of Allahabad required him to pay a significant indemnity to the British East India Company to be restored to power. With his resources depleted from the conflict, he sought financial help from his family, friends, and other officials, most of whom contributed minimally. In the end, it was Bahu Begum who financed the purchase of his sovereignty, providing the initial down payment of two million rupees in cash and jewels. Chroniclers of the day portrayed this as an act of supreme devotion, noting that she even sacrificed her nose ring with pearls, which most married women would be loath to part with.

Shuja-ud-Daula was said to be deeply moved by Bahu Begum's generosity and loyalty, and rewarded her financially. He gave her additional jagirs, entrusted her with the state seals, and gave her half the revenues of the state, adding considerably to her wealth. She, in turn, invested in commercial granaries (ganj) which generated further revenue. Other sources of income for her included interest-bearing loans, offered via her eunuchs' networks, and tributary gifts she received from people trying to gain favour with the nawab.

Her formal title, Jenab Aliya Muta-aliya, literally meant "Most exalted lady of the exalted", indicating that she was the favourite wife of Shuja-ud-Daula. (Her popular name, Bahu Begum, translates to "daughter-in-law begum".) As political tensions with the East India Company grew, Shuja-ud-Daula involved her in his dealings, inviting her to accompany him to Banaras for the impending arrival of Warren Hastings.

=== Relationship with Asaf-ud-Daula ===
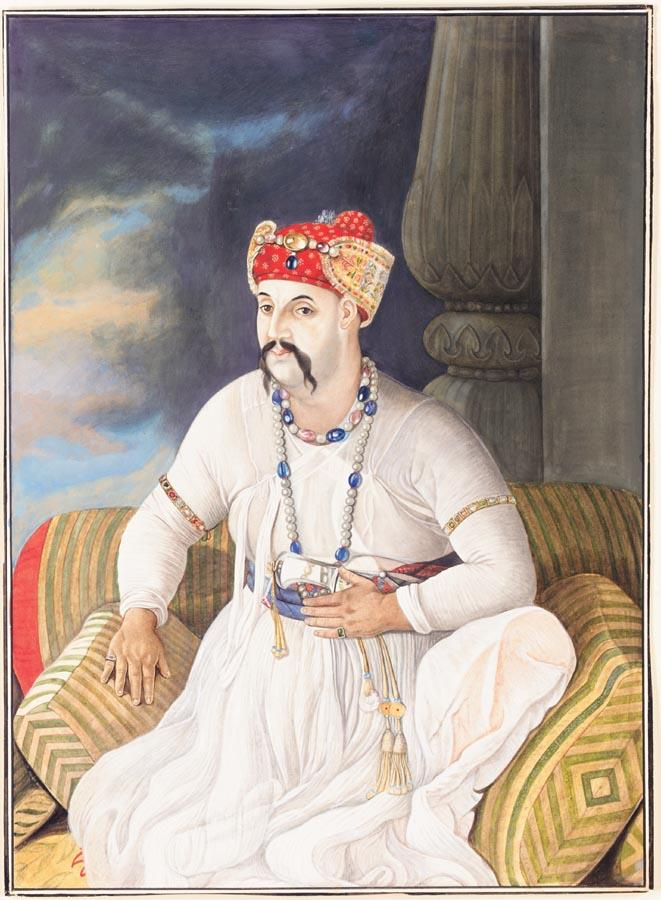
Asaf-ud-Daula after a portrait by Zoffany

The eldest son of Shuja-ud-Daula was Asaf-ud-Daula, the only child of Bahu Begum. From his youth, his teachers, father, and grandmother expressed concern about his suitability as an heir, because of his indulgent behaviour. Shuja-ud-Daula considered the possibility of naming Mirza Mangli, his son by another wife (Chattar Kunwar), as his successor. Nevertheless, Bahu Begum was determined to make her son the next nawab. As her husband's health declined, she kept him isolated and encouraged Asaf-ud-Daula to act in his father's stead. Immediately following his death in 1775, she wrote to British officials in the East India Company and to her late husband's military commanders for acknowledgement of Asaf-ud-Daula as the rightful heir. She also kept her son's main rival for power, Mirza Mangli (later known as Saadat Ali Khan), in check, instructing one of his generals to seize him if he started conspiring against his half-brother.

Her relationship with her son started deteriorating soon after his accession as nawab. Asaf-ud-Daula repeatedly demanded money and loans from Bahu Begum, which he quickly squandered. Against the wishes of his mother and grandmother, he also ceded Benares to the East India Company to pay off his father's debts. His principal advisor was Murtaza Khan, who had once been banished from Awadh by Shuja-ud-Daula. Murtaza Khan moved to dismiss long-standing officials and servants who had been loyal to Shuja-ud-Daula and replace them with his own relatives and supporters.

Asaf-ud-Daula soon left Faizabad for good, taking up residence in Lucknow, where he could live without interference from his mother and grandmother. Bahu Begum then began direct correspondence with the British resident of Awadh, John Bristow, complaining about her son. Bristow, however, was aware that the cash and other assets of past nawabs, including Shuja-ud-Daula and Safdar Jang, were secured in the zenana controlled by Bahu Begum, and that Asaf-ud-Daula wished to claim his right to those assets. Bristow then brokered an agreement between Asaf-ud-Daula and Bahu Begum, in which she would pay an additional 3 million rupees to her son, after which he would relinquish all other claims against her. Bahu Begum was persuaded to sign the agreement by two of her brothers, who advised that it was the best compromise under the circumstances. After the cash and assets were delivered, however, tensions continued to escalate, as Murtaza Khan disputed the value of the in-kind assets, infuriating Bahu Begum who wrote to the Governor-General accusing Bristow of misconduct.

=== Benares uprising and occupation of Faizabad ===
Bahu Begum and Sadr-un-Nissa Begum were widely believed to have indirectly supported the failed Benares uprising of 1781. Some historians, however, have argued that their seclusion in purdah was a plausible alibi against their involvement, and that rogue eunuchs were to blame for instigating violence. One of Bahu Begum's main accusers was minister Haidar Beg Khan, who had been in contact with Chait Singh himself.

In any event, the governor-general Warren Hastings was convinced by Haidar Beg Khan that Bahu Begum had approved the rebellion, and urged Asaf-ud-Daula to confiscate her treasury and her jagirs. By early 1782, forces under the command of the Resident and Asaf-ud-Daula had surrounded Bahu Begum's palace in Faizabad and imprisoned several high-ranking eunuchs. The nawab had also taken control of his mother's jagirs.

In the years that followed, however, Asaf-ud-Daula became increasingly resentful of British intrusion in his affairs. After occupying the old capital for over a year and collecting payment from the eunuchs, he withdrew his forces from Faizabad. He also took steps to reconcile with his mother and grandmother. In 1785, he returned the jagirs to Bahu Begum. He invited his mother and grandmother to Lucknow to attend a lavish wedding, and made a public proclamation of his respect for them. Although he continued to ask her for money, Asaf-ud-Daula started consulting Bahu Begum about official appointments and secretly began depositing his assets with her.

=== Conflict with Saadat Ali Khan ===
Following the death of her son in 1797, Bahu Begum supported the accession of 18-year-old Wazir Ali Khan, the adopted son of Asaf-ud-Daula. During the confusion of his reign, she seized Asaf-ud-Daula's animals and moveable property and moved them to Faizabad.

Four months later, Wazir Ali Khan was deposed by the East India Company and replaced with Mirza Mangli, who became known as Nawab Saadat Ali Khan. Both the resident and the governor-general John Shore sought Bahu Begum's support for the regime change, despite the fact that she had long opposed the new nawab. At this point, she employed as many as ten thousand people in her patronage network.

Shore brokered an agreement between Bahu Begum and Saadat Ali Khan, to guarantee her sources of income, including her control of certain jagirs. Nevertheless, the nawab proceeded to curtail her authority by limiting her allowances, taking control of the jagirs of her relatives, and stationing troops in Faizabad. He also upset her by granting his own mother the title of Jenab Aliya, similar to her own title which she had held exclusively during her husband's reign.

=== Last will and testament ===
Incensed by actions taken by Saadat Ali Khan, Bahu Begum took the highly unusual step of meeting personally with James Lumsden, the resident of Oudh. Only her minister Jawahir Ali Khan was present at the interview. In the meeting, she declared that she would bequeath all her property to the British government. Several years later, Bahu Begum sent Captain John Baillie her will listing her final wishes to be fulfilled, including the construction and maintenance of a mausoleum over her grave, donations to shrines in Kerbala, and allowances her minister and relatives, after which the rest of her property would belong to the British. However, the will lacked any detailed description of her assets.

As her health declined in her final years, Baillie was sent to visit Bahu Begum and ask for an accurate statement of her property and where it was held. Although she expressed disgust at the suggestion that she invest in the East India Company while she was still alive, he eventually convinced her that the British government would be unable to fulfill her wishes without more information. She eventually furnished a deed of disposal revising certain terms in her original will and describing where her money, jewels, and other property were kept.

== Death and legacy ==
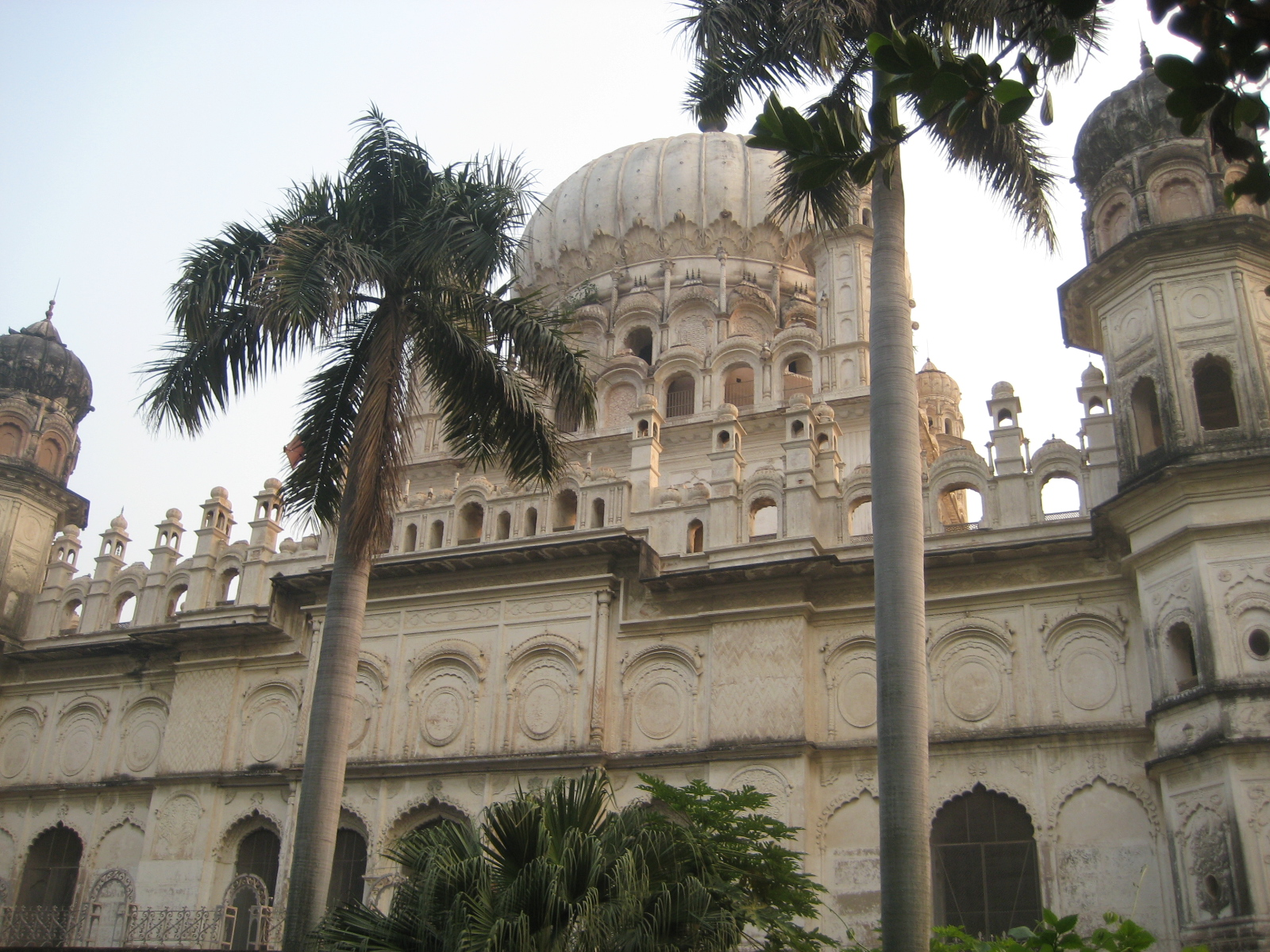
Mausoleum of Bahu Begum

Bahu Begum outlived Saadat Ali Khan by over one year. British officials prevented his son and successor Ghazi-ud-Din Haidar Shah from seeing her in her final days, to prevent her from changing her mind about her will.

She died in 1815 at the age of 88. She became feverish after her annual visit to her nephew during Muharram to see the tazia of Imam Husayn. Before she died, she repeated that "the great Nawab" had come to take her, a reference to her late husband Shuja-ud-Daula. Her steward Darab Ali Khan conducted the funeral rites.
