= Bahu Begum (disambiguation) =

Bahu Begum, also written Bahu Begam, may refer to:

- Bahu Begum, chief consort to Shuja-ud-Daula of Awadh
- Bahu Begum (film), a 1967 Hindi film
- Bahu Begum (2019 TV series)

== See also ==
- Bahu Begum ka Maqbara, the tomb of Bahu Begum
