= Asaf-ud-Daula =

Mughal and British era nobleman, Wazir (Minister) of the Nawab of Awadh (1748–1797)

- Mirza (Royal title); Nawab Wazir of Awadh; Khan Bahadur; Adan Muqaam (Note: title after death)
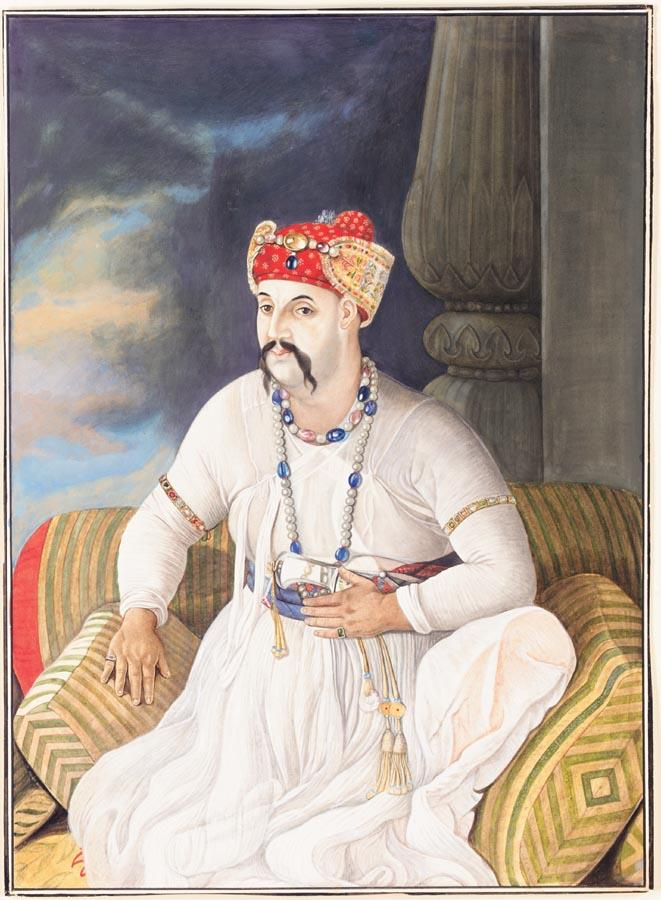
- Water colour in style of Zoffany

Nawab of Awadh
- Reign: 26 January 1775 – 21 September 1797
- Coronation: 26 January 1775
- Predecessor: Shuja-ud-Daula
- Successor: Wazir Ali Khan
- Born: 23 September 1748; Faizabad, Kingdom of Oudh
- Died: 21 September 1797 (aged 48); Lucknow, Kingdom of Oudh
- Burial: Bara Imambara, Lucknow
- Issue: adopted son Wazir Ali Khan
Names
- Muhammad Yahiya Meerza Amani Asaf-ud-Daula
- House: Nishapuri
- Dynasty: Qara Qoyunlu
- Father: Shuja-ud-Daula
- Mother: Bahu Begum
- Religion: Shia Islam
- Military career
- Allegiance: Mughal Empire
- Branch: Nawab of Oudh
- Rank: Nawab; Grand Vizier; Subadar

Mirza Asaf-ud-Daula (23 September 1748 – 21 September 1797) was the Nawab wazir of Oudh ratified by the Mughal emperor Shah Alam II, from 26 January 1775 to 21 September 1797, and the son of Shuja-ud-Dowlah. His mother and grandmother were the Begums of Oudh.

== Reign ==
Asaf-ud-Dowlah became Nawab at the age of 26, on the death of his father, Shuja-ud-Daula, on 28 January 1775. He assumed the throne with the aid of the British East India Company, outmanoeuvring his younger brother Saadat Ali who led a failed mutiny in the army. British Colonel John Parker defeated the mutineers decisively, securing Asaf-ud-Daula's succession. His first Chief Minister, Mukhtar-ud-Daula, was assassinated in the revolt.

The other challenge to Asaf's rule was his mother Umat-ul-Zohra (better known as Bahu Begum), who had amassed considerable control over the treasury and her own jagirs and private armed forces. She, at one point, sought the Company's direct assistance in the appointment of anti-Asaf ministers. When Shuja-ud-Daula died, he left two million pounds sterling buried in the vaults of the zenana. The widow and mother of the deceased prince claimed the whole of this treasure under the terms of a will which was never produced. When Warren Hastings pressed the nawab for the payment of the debt due to the Company, he obtained from his mother a loan of 26 lakh (2.6 million) rupees, for which he gave her a jagir (land) of four times the value; of subsequently obtained 30 lakh (3 million) more in return for a full acquittal, and the recognition of her jagirs without interference for life by the Company. These jagirs were afterwards confiscated on the ground of the begum's complicity in the rising of Chait Singh, which was attested by documentary evidence.

In the aftermath of Saadat's revolt, Asaf sought to restructure the government, particularly by appointing nobles favourable to his cause and British officers to his military. Asaf appointed Hasan Riza Khan as his chief minister. Although he had little experience in administration, his assistant Haydar Beg Khan turned out to be a valuable support. Tikayt Ray was appointed as the finance minister.

Asaf was known for his generosity, particularly the offering of food and public employment in times of famine. Notably, the Bara Imambara in Lucknow, was constructed during his reign by destitute workers seeking employment. A popular saying of his time spoke of his benevolence: "Jisko na de Maulā, usko de Asaf-ud-daulā" which translates to "to whom even God does not give, Asaf-ud-Daula gives."

He was painted several times by Johann Zoffany.

== Shifting the capital ==
In 1775 he moved the capital of Awadh from Faizabad to Lucknow and built various monuments in and around Lucknow, including the Bara Imambara.

== Architectural and other contributions ==
Nawab Asaf-ud-Dowlah is considered the architect general of Lucknow. With the ambition to outshine the splendour of Mughal architecture, he built a number of monuments and developed the city of Lucknow into an architectural marvel. Several of the buildings survive today, include the famed Asafi Imambara, which attracts tourists even today, and the Qaisar Bagh area of the downtown Lucknow where thousands live in resurrected buildings.

The Asafi Imambara is a famed vaulted structure surrounded by beautiful gardens, which the Nawab started as a charitable project to generate employment during the famine of 1784. In that famine even the nobles were reduced to penury. It is said that Nawab Asaf employed over 20,000 people for the project (including commoners and noblemen), which was neither a masjid nor a mausoleum (contrary to the popular contemporary norms of buildings). The Nawab's sensitivity towards preserving the reputation of the upper class is demonstrated in the story of the construction of Imambara. During daytime, common citizens employed on the project would construct the building. On the night of every fourth day, the noble and upper-class people were employed in secret to demolish the structure built, an effort for which they received payment. Thus, their dignity was preserved.

The Nawab became so famous for his generosity that it is still a well-known saying in Lucknow that "he who does not receive (livelihood) from the Ali-Moula, will receive it from Asaf-ud-Doula" (Jisko na de Moula, usko de Asaf-ud-Doula).

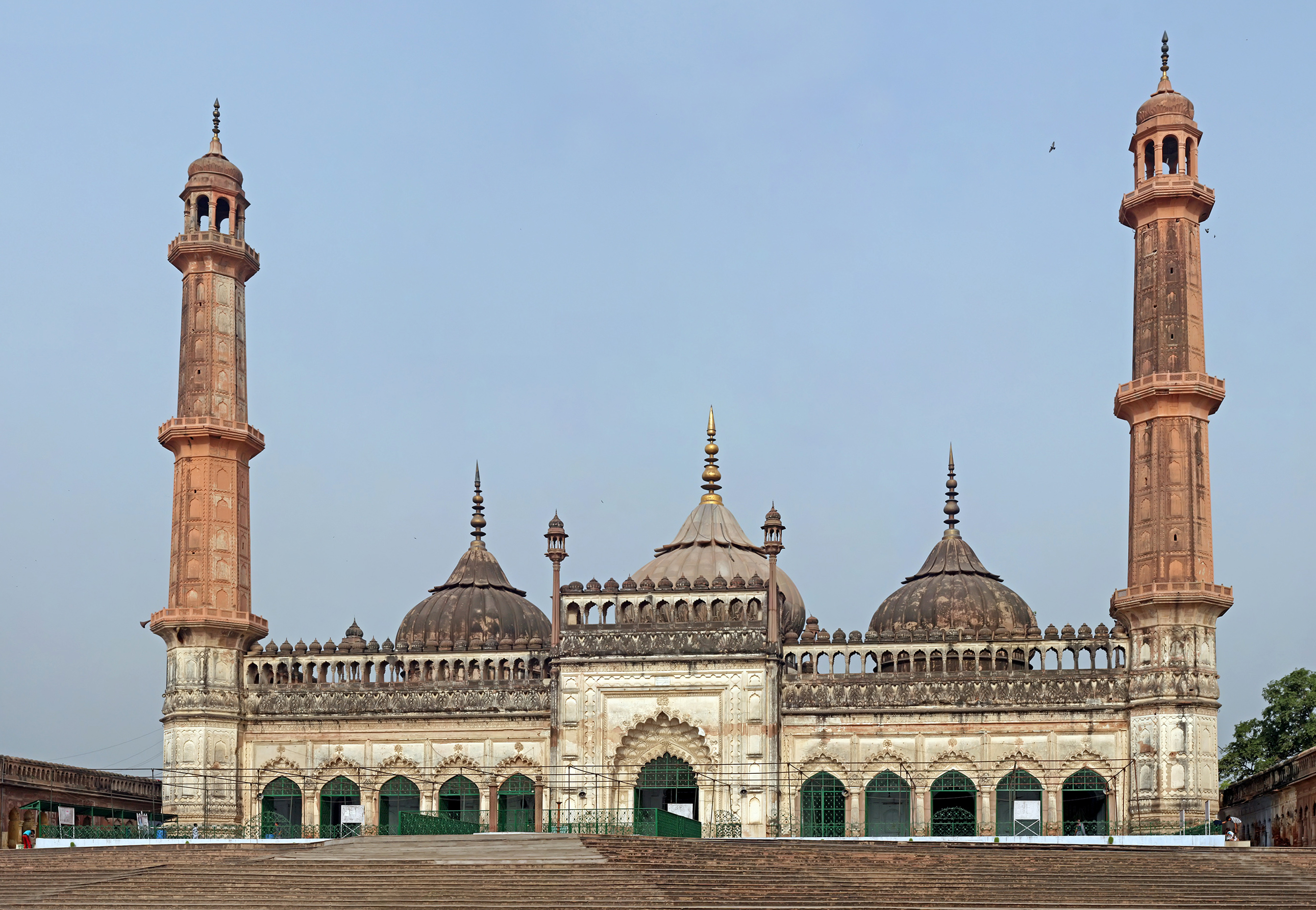
Asfi mosque, named after the Nawab, Asaf-ud-Daula.

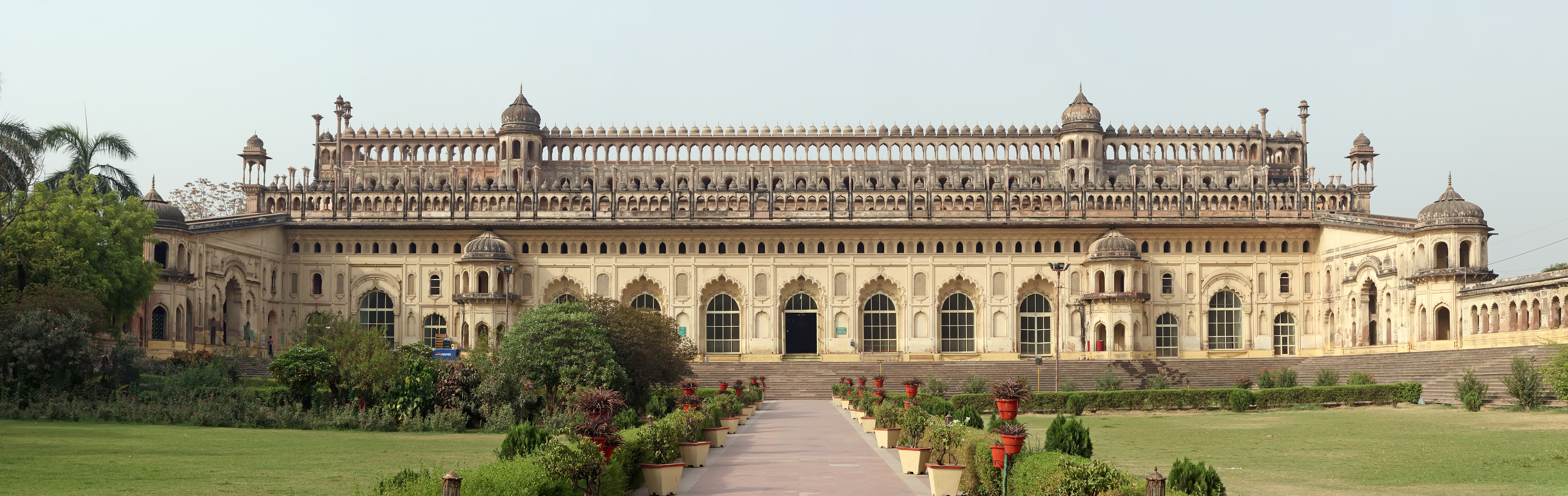
Bara Imambara (Asafi Imambara), an imambara, was built by Asaf-ud-Daula, in 1784 at Lucknow.

=== Rumi Darwaza (Turkish Gate) ===
The Rumi Darwaza, which stands sixty feet tall, modeled (1784) after the Sublime Porte (Bab-iHümayun) in Istanbul, is one of the most important examples of the exchange between the two cultures.

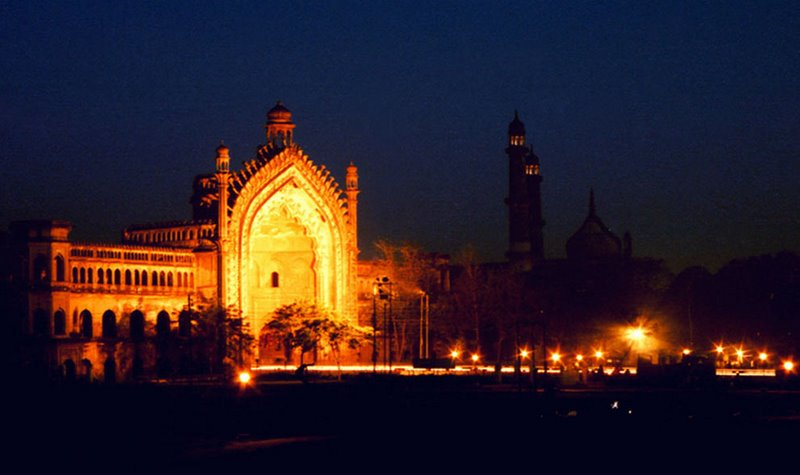

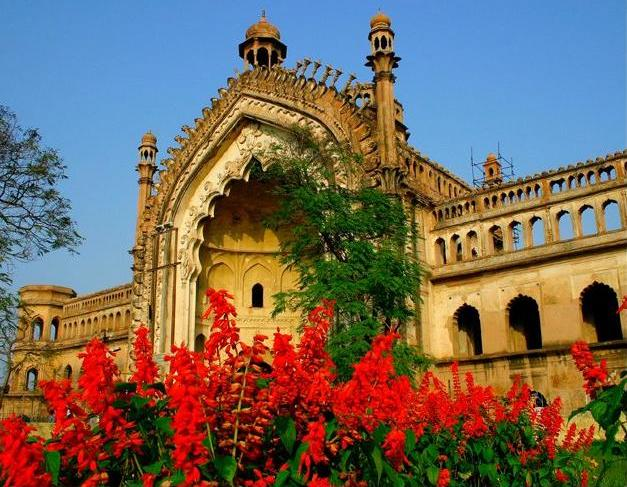

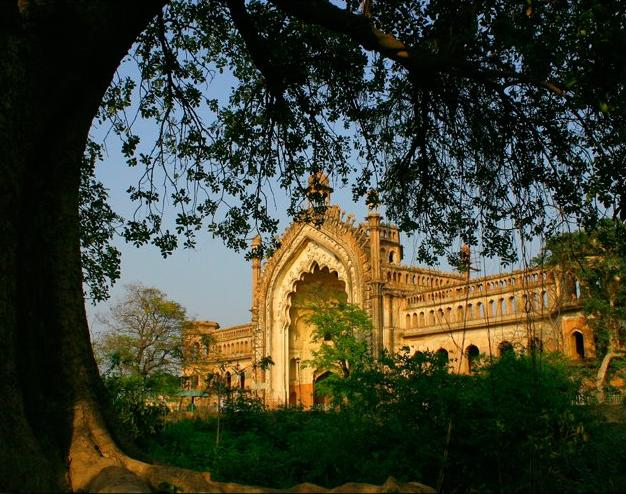

== Death ==
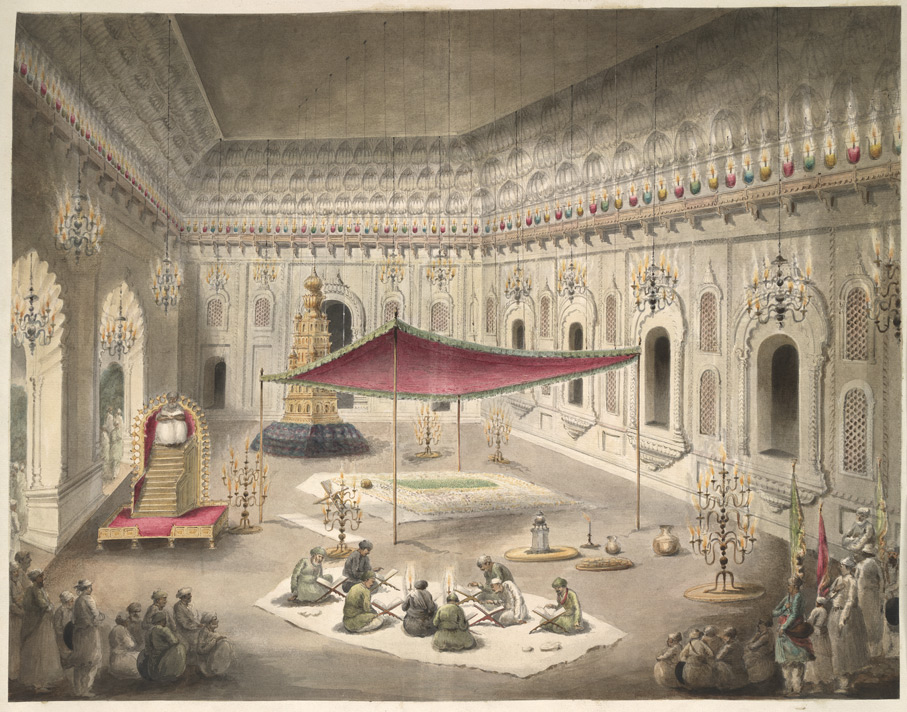
The simple grave of Asaf ud-Daula under a canopy inside the Bara Imambara; a watercolor by Seeta Ram, c.1814–15 (note:Flag of the Mughal Empire raised higher than the Awadh flag)

He died on 21 September 1797 in Lucknow and is buried at Bara Imambara, Lucknow.

== Gallery ==
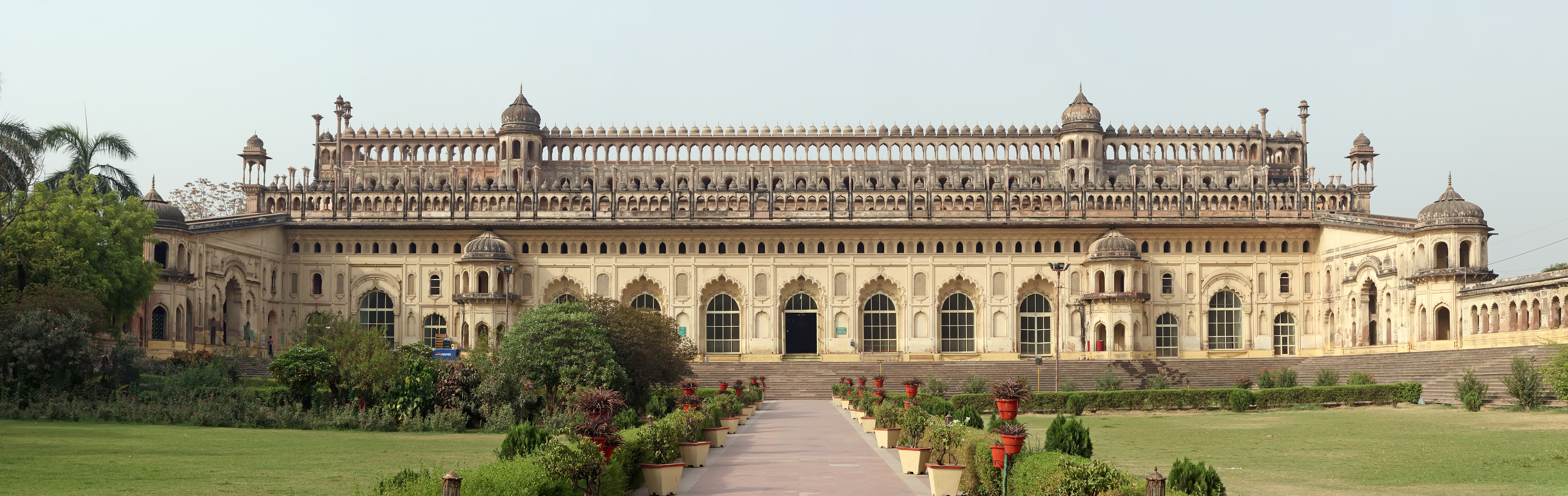
Bara Imambara, Lucknow, built by Asaf-ud-Daula

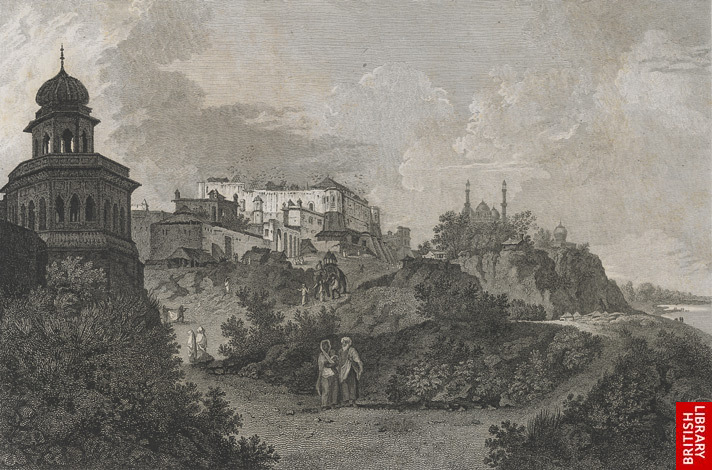
A view of the Palace of the Asaf-ud-Daula at Lucknow, c.1793

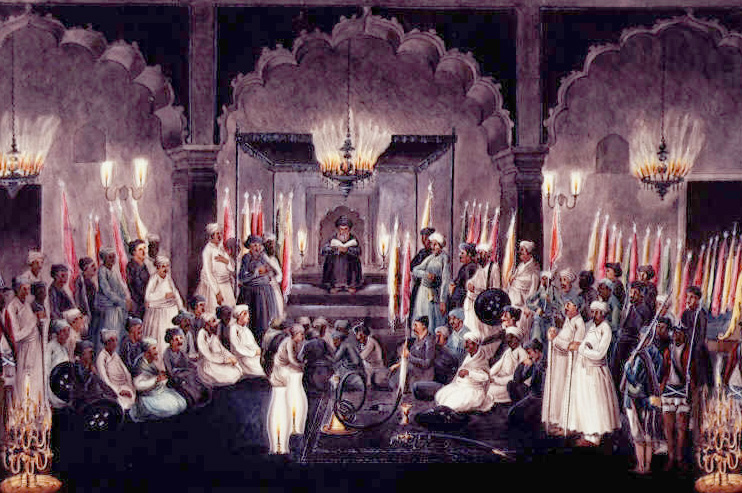
Asaf-ud-Daula, conducting the Muharram rituals at Lucknow, c.1812

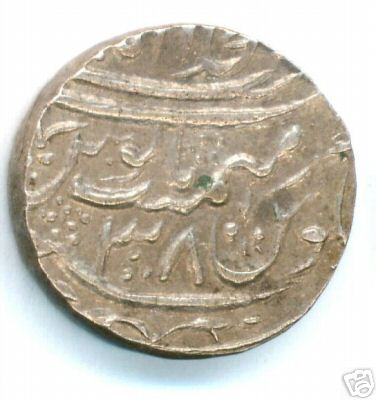
A silver ashrafi issued by Asaf-ud-Daula from the Najibabad mint in AH 1211 (1796/7), regnal year 38

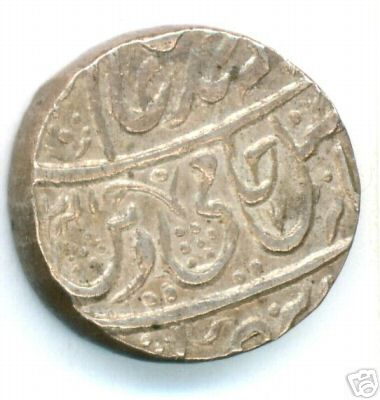
A silver ashrafi issued by Asaf-ud-Daula from the Najibabad mint in AH 1211 (1796/7), regnal year 38

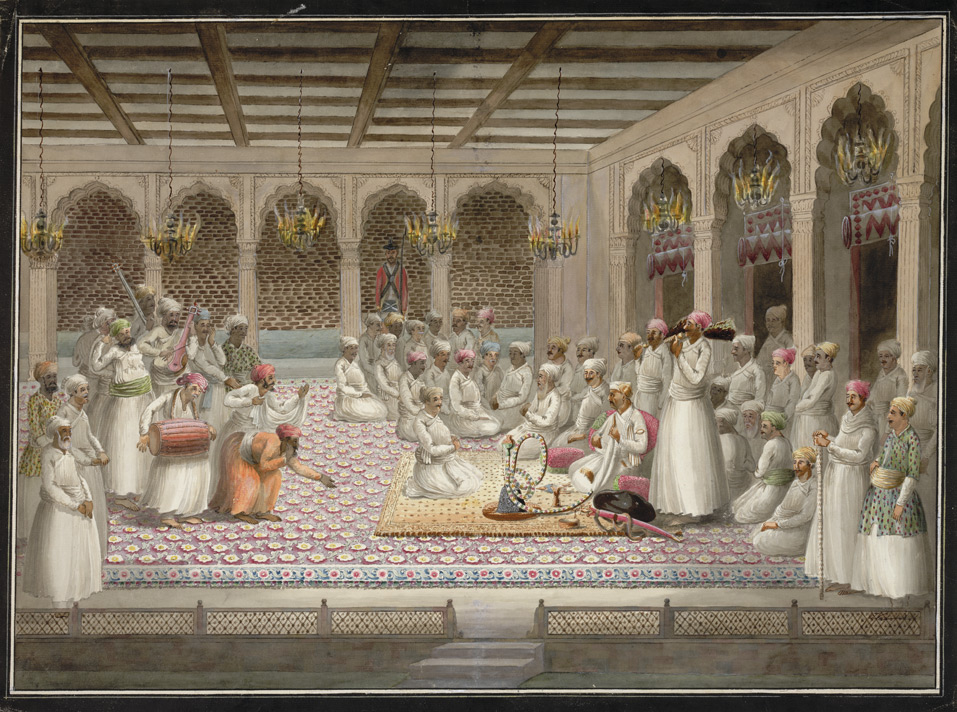
Nawab Asaf-ud-Daula seated on a rug smoking a hookah and listening to a party of male musicians, c.1812

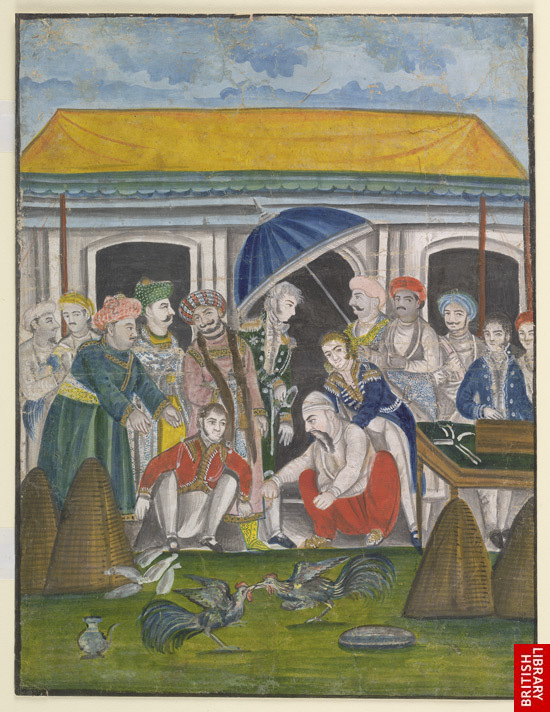
Asaf-ud-Daula at a cock-fight with Europeans; this painting most likely depicts the famous cockfight between Asaf al-Daula and Colonel Mordaunt which took place at Lucknow in 1786, c.1830-35

== Timeline ==
Preceded by Jalal ad-Din Shoja` ad-Dowla Haydar	Wazir al-Mamalik of Oudh; 1775 – 1797	Succeeded by Mirza Wazir `Ali Khan

== See also ==
- Bahu Begum ka Maqbara, the monument to his mother, Bahu Begum (also known as Umat uz-Zohra Begum)
- Safdar Jang, grandfather of Asaf-ud-Daula
- Tomb of Safdar Jang, his grandfather's memorial
- Claude Martin, French army officer who later served in India for the British East India company
- Mir Taqi Mir, Urdu poet at the Lucknow court of Asaf-ud-Daula
- Antoine Polier, Swiss adventurer and soldier who made his fortune in India, and designed a royal residence at Lucknow
- Dum pukht
