= Banaras Uprising of 1781 =

Rebel of Benares state against the Company rule

The Banaras Uprising of 1781 (also known as Chait Singh's Rebellion) was a significant armed revolt against the British East India Company in northern India. The rebellion began in Banaras (present-day Varanasi) following Warren Hastings attempt to extract additional revenue from Maharaja Chait Singh, but quickly spread to neighboring regions including Awadh (Oudh). The uprising represented one of the earliest organized resistances to expanding British control in the subcontinent and had lasting consequences for British administrative policies in northern India.

== Background ==
=== Political context ===
In the late 18th century, the British East India Company was expanding its influence throughout northern India. The Company had established a Residency at Banaras in 1775, and Raja Chait Singh, while maintaining titular authority, had become a tributary of the Company. Similarly, in neighboring Awadh, the Nawab had increasingly come under British influence, with Company officials involving themselves in revenue collection and military affairs.

=== Financial demands ===
In July 1778, Warren Hastings, the Governor-General of Bengal, levied an emergency war subsidy of Rs. 5,00,000 on Raja Chait Singh of Banaras to help finance the Anglo-French conflict. While Chait Singh paid this subsidy and its renewal the following year, by 1780-81, when the Second Anglo-Mysore War created additional financial strain on British resources, he fell behind on his payments. Hastings also demanded 2,000 cavalry for use by the Company, which Chait Singh failed to provide.

== The uprising ==
=== Initial confrontation ===
In August 1781, Hastings personally traveled to Banaras to confront Chait Singh about the arrears and to impose penalties. Viewing the Raja's behavior as "criminal contumacy and disobedience," Hastings tried to place Chait Singh under house arrest. This precipitated an immediate violent reaction from the Raja's supporters, who attacked and massacred the small Company detachment guarding him. Bravery military commanders of Chait Singh have taken their Raja to his Ramnagar fort safely, during the conflict, and Hastings himself was forced to flee to Chunar Fort.

=== Spread of the rebellion ===
What began as a localized conflict quickly expanded throughout the region. According to contemporary accounts, the revolt spread "so rapidly in all directions that it seems to have been planned in advance and coordinated over the entire area from Farrukhabad to Patna." By mid-September, British forces were encountering rebel units numbering up to 10,000 fighters.

=== Role of the Begums of Awadh ===
The uprising provided an opportunity for the Begums (royal women) of Awadh to resist growing British influence in their territories. The Begams, particularly the elder Begam (Burra Begum) and her associates, supported the rebellion both financially and by recruiting fighters. They directed particular hostility toward Colonel Alexander Hannay, whom Hastings had appointed in 1778 as a revenue contractor in Gorakhpur and Bahraich districts.

=== The Faizabad front ===
In Faizabad, the former capital of Awadh, the Begams' eunuch administrators Jawahar Ali and Bahar Ali played instrumental roles in coordinating anti-British activities. They recruited troops, disrupted supply lines, interrupted postal communications, and organized attacks on isolated British contingents. Colonel Hannay found himself besieged in Faizabad, with many of his troops deserting to join the rebels.

== British response ==
=== Military suppression ===
The British mobilized reinforcements from Allahabad, Kanpur (Cawnpore), and Lucknow to quell the uprising. Despite widespread rural support for the rebellion, by early October 1781, the superior military technology and organization of the Company forces had largely suppressed the revolt. The rebellion was characterized in British records as involving "Gongwallas" (village people), suggesting it had assumed dimensions of an agrarian revolt against Company revenue collection methods.

=== Support of few local Rajput Rajas and Zamindars to the British ===
During the uprising raised by Maharaja Chait Singh, almost the entire population supported the rebellion, however, a few Rajput chiefs joined hands and allied with the British to intercept the forces of Maharaja Chait Singh coming from Ramnagar & Varanasi. In return, the Britishers rewarded these Rajputs by money allowances or by restoration to their ancestral estates for being faithful to the Company.

=== Consequences for Raja Chait Singh ===
Chait Singh was permanently deposed from his position, and a more compliant relative was installed as Raja of Banaras under stricter Company control. The annual tribute was substantially increased, further cementing British economic dominance in the region.

=== Punishment of the Begams ===
Following the suppression of the revolt, the British took punitive measures against the Begams of Awadh. With the cooperation of the Nawab of Awadh (whose orientation toward the British differed markedly from the Begams), the Company confiscated substantial funds from the Begams, accusing them of supporting the rebellion. This incident later featured prominently in the articles of impeachment against Warren Hastings.

== Aftermath and significance ==
=== Administrative reforms ===
The rebellion, though ultimately unsuccessful, forced the Company to reconsider aspects of its governance. The most immediate change was "the complete redeployment of the British officer corps in Awadh." All Company officers in the Nawab's service were recalled, with instructions that their forces be paid before disbandment. Garrisons were repositioned, and a rotation system was implemented for remaining troops.

=== Removal of British revenue contractors ===
One significant outcome was the forced removal of direct British involvement in local revenue administration, particularly "Hannay's disruptive ijarah in Gorakhpur/Bahraich." Colonel Hannay was recalled by Hastings, stripped of authority, and all British personnel were removed from the revenue-collecting network he had controlled. Hannay reportedly died in Calcutta shortly afterward, with some accounts suggesting suicide.

=== Long-term impact ===
The Banaras Uprising highlighted the tensions created by expanding British administrative control into areas previously governed by traditional Indian authorities. The rebellion's failure demonstrated the growing military superiority of the Company, but also revealed the potential for widespread resistance when local power structures were disrupted too abruptly.

The revolt is significant as an early example of organized resistance against British colonial expansion, predating the more famous Indian Rebellion of 1857 by over seven decades, and shares certain characteristics with it, including the role of displaced elites and agrarian discontent.

== Legacy ==
The events surrounding the Banaras Uprising featured prominently in Warren Hastings' impeachment trial in Britain, where his treatment of Raja Chait Singh and the Begams of Awadh were presented as examples of misgovernance and corruption. Although Hastings was ultimately acquitted, the episode contributed to growing scrutiny of East India Company governance in India and eventually to greater Parliamentary oversight.
