= Nose chain =

Type of facial jewelry

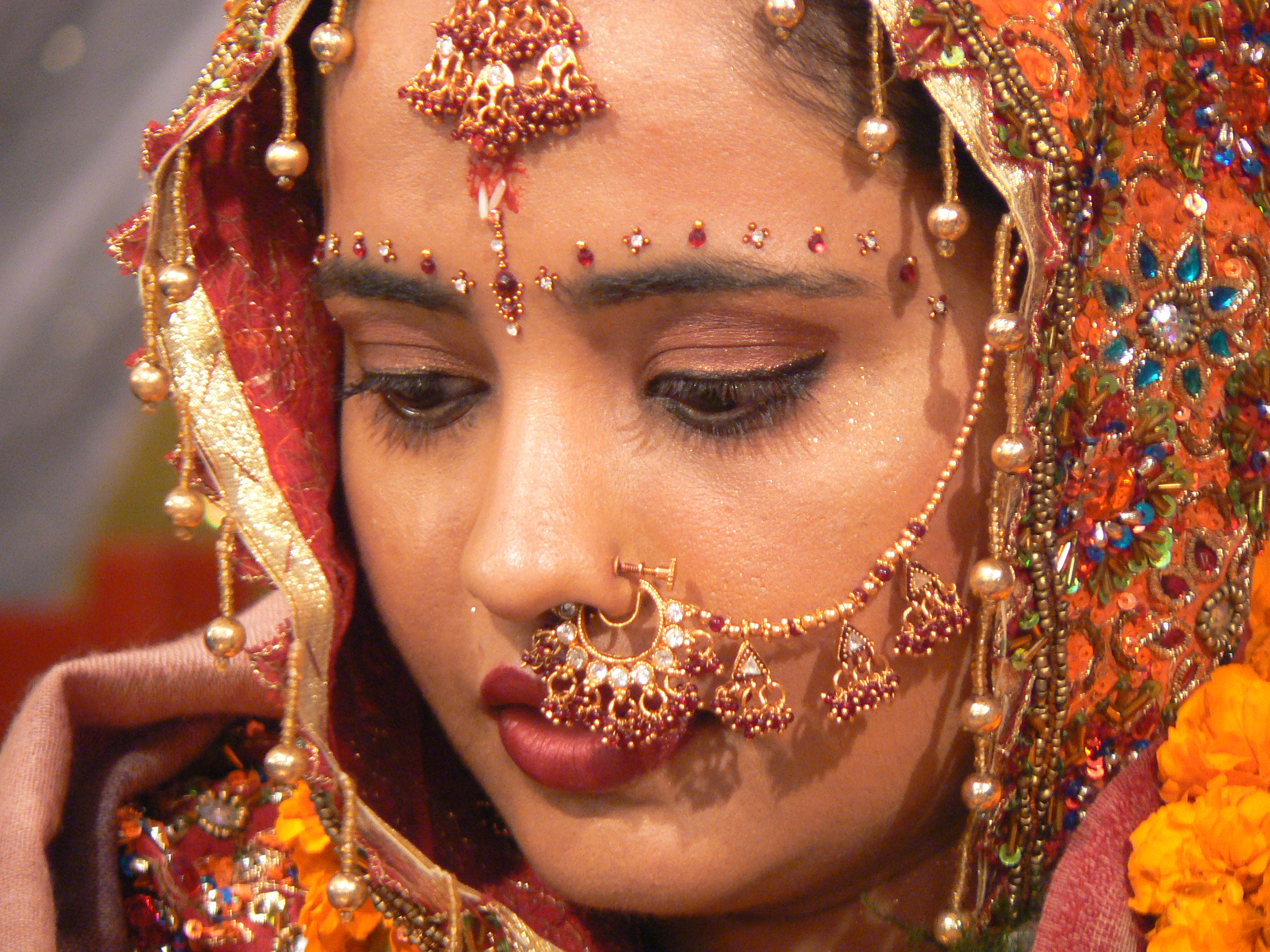
Indian bride wearing a nose chain

A nose chain is a type of facial jewelry that originated centuries ago in Indus Valley Civilization as part of women's fashion in India.

== Physical aspects ==
Simply put, the nose chain is a link between a nose piercing and an ear-piercing. Typically, these "chains" are just that: chain links, usually (though not always) made of some kind of metal. Yet, besides actual chains, the term "nose chain" can denote other types of connecting materials between the nose and ear piercings, such as the common alternative of rosary beads. Other connectors can be used as well.

== History ==
The nose chain has been commonly worn by women in South Asia and North Africa (Sudan) for centuries. Women in India have been wearing them since before 6th century. It can be evidently seen in many Indian sculptures. It is especially significant during wedding ceremonies. Hindu tradition suggests that on the wedding night, the bride wears a nose piercing which is in some regions of India is hooked by a chain to either the earring or hair, is only a nose ring in some, and a nose stud in others. The nose piercing is worn by women as ancient sanātana dharma practices believed that the left nostril piercing helps in reproductive and womb health and accordingly, upon marriage, women used to get their left nostril pierced (as ancient civilizations considered procreation/reproduction as a natural aspect of marriage).

=== Subculture ===
Today the nose chain has risen to prevalence as a recent appropriation of Hindu customs and introduction of Gothic fashion and is now known for its use in several different subcultures around the world.
