= Bahu Begum ka Maqbara =

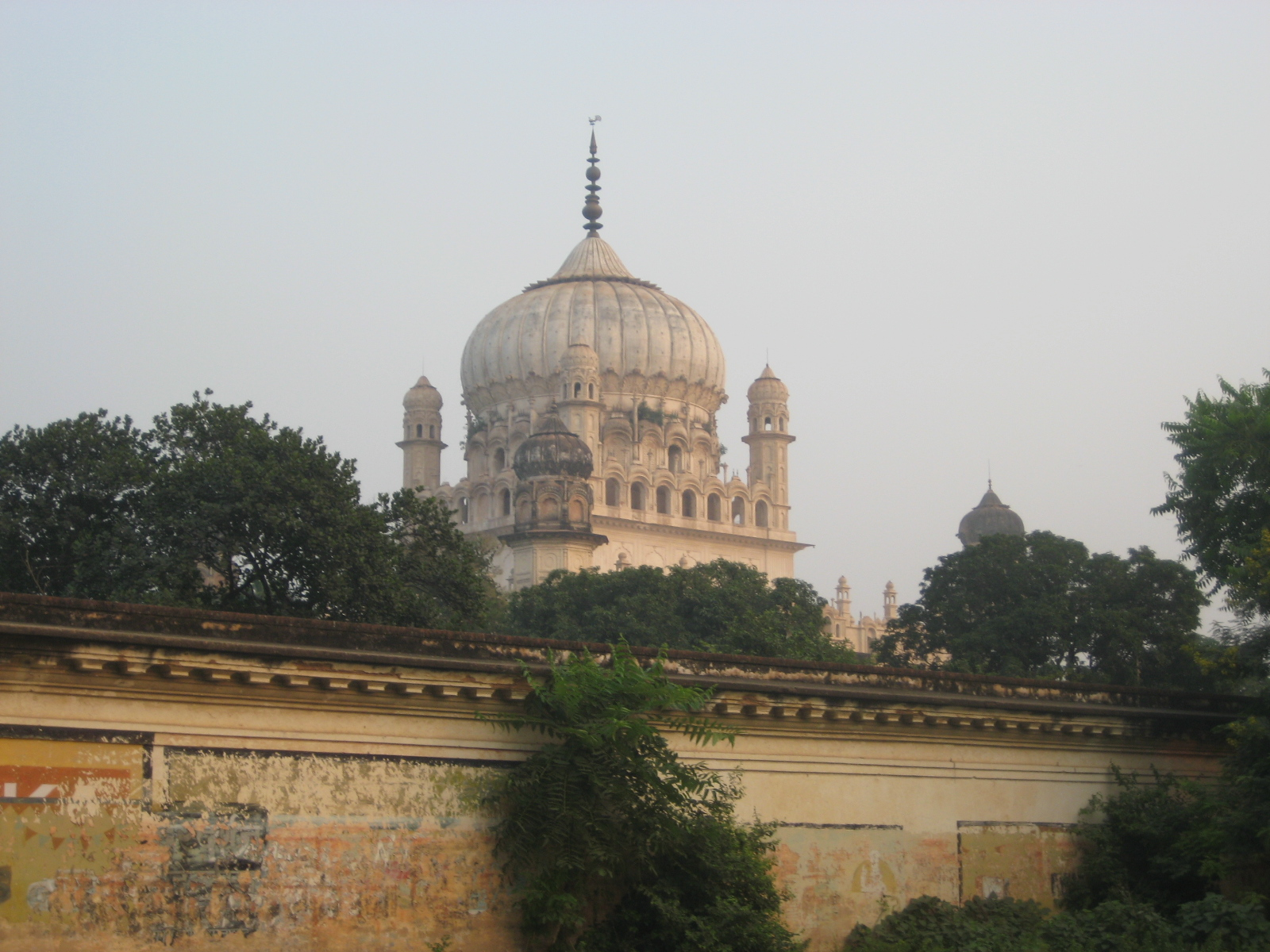
- Tomb of Unmatuzzohra Bano Begum alias Bahu Begum
- Interactive map of Bahu Begum ka Maqbara
- 26°45′58″N 082°08′40″E
- Location: Faizabad, Ayodhya district, Uttar Pradesh, India

History
- Built: 1816

Site notes
- Elevation: 335 ft (102 m)
- Architect: Darab Ali Khan
- Architectural style: Nawabi`

Bahu Begum ka Maqbara, the Tomb of chief consort Begum Unmatuzzohra Bano also known as Bahu Begum, is a memorial built for the queen of Nawab Shuja-ud-Daula. It is one of the tallest buildings in Faizabad of the Ayodhya district, Uttar Pradesh and is a notable example of non-Mughal Muslim architecture. This monument is a victim of neglect and is depleting.

== History ==
The Mausoleum of Bahu Begum, built by Nawab Shuja-ud-Daula in memory of his loving wife, is famous for the creative architectural brilliance with which it was designed and constructed. Shuja-ud-Daula's wife was well known as Bahu Begum, who married the Nawab in 1743 and continued to reside in Faizabad, her residence being the Moti-Mahal. Close by at Jawaharbagh lies her Maqbara, where she was buried after her death in 1816. It is considered to be one of the finest buildings of its kind in Avadh, which was built at the cost of three lakh rupees by her chief advisor Darab Ali Khan. A fine view of the city is obtainable from the top of the Begum's tomb. Bahu Begum was a woman of great distinction and rank, bearing dignity. Most of the Muslim buildings of Faizabad are attributed to her. From the date of Bahu Begum's death in 1815 till the annexation of Avadh, the city of Faizabad gradually fell into decay. The glory of Faizabad was eclipsed with the shifting of capital from Faizabad to Lucknow by Nawab Asaf-ud-Daula.

"Bahu Begum" (H.H. Nawab 'Umat uz-Zohra Begum Sahiba) was the widow of the third Nawab of Avadh or Oudh, Shuja-ud-Daula (H.H. Shuja ud-Daula, Nawab Mirza Jalal ud-din Haidar Khan Bahadur, Nawab Wazir of Oudh, r. 1754-75). Her maqbara, "the finest building of the kind in Oudh" (Carnegy, Woodburn & Noble 1870: 26) was not completed before 1858. This date is important since Umrao Jan expressively mentions that her father worked there as "jamadar". In "A Historical Sketch of Tahsil Fyzabad, Zillah Fyzabad, including Parganas Haveli Oudh and Pachhimrath, with the old Capitals Ajudhia and Fyzabad, Pargana Mangalsi and Pargana Amsin" (Lucknow 1870), the account on this monument is as follows: "The Bahu Begam's Mausoleum. It was arranged by treaty between the British Government, the Bahu Begam, and the Nawáb of Oudh, that 3 lacs of sicca Rs. of her riches, were to be set apart for the erection by her confidential servant Daráb Alí Khán, of her tomb, and that the revenue of the villages to the aggregate amount of sicca Rs. 10,000 per annum, were to be assigned for its support. The Begam died on the 27th of January 1816. Daráb Alí laid the foundations and built the plinth, when he also died, on the 10th of August 1818. Panáh Alí, vakíl, and Mirzá Haider, the son of an adopted daughter, then carried on the work through a series of years when, with the completion of the brick work, the grant of 3 lacs came to an end, and the beautiful edifice remained unfinished till after the mutiny of 1857." (ibid.: 26).

== Monuments in Ayodhya ==
The Nawabs graced Ayodhya with several buildings, notable among them are the Gulab Bari, the Moti Mahal and the Bahu Begum ka Maqbara.

Gulab Bari is a building standing in a garden surrounded by a wall, approachable through two large gateways. The tomb was built in 1816 from white marble and was an attempt to recreate the grandeur of the Taj Mahal at a cost of Rs 3 lakhs. The marble used almost 200 years ago still shines its brightest and provides the Mausoleum of Bahu Begum an aura of immortality. Rising up to 42 meters, the tomb also affords view of the Ayodhya town and its surroundings. This royal monument in memory of a dignified woman has been maintained well and even today the care taken by the Archaeological department is evident. In this tomb (Gulab Bari) had been hidden the treasure of jewellery belonging to Begum Khurshid Mahal, the mother of Nawab Asaf-ud-Daulah. The value of this jewellery treasure was Rs. 80 lakhs (eight million), which was a phenomenal, unimaginable fortune in the 1850s. This invaluable treasure was looted and despoiled by Colonel Hunt, a British army officer.

== Gallery ==
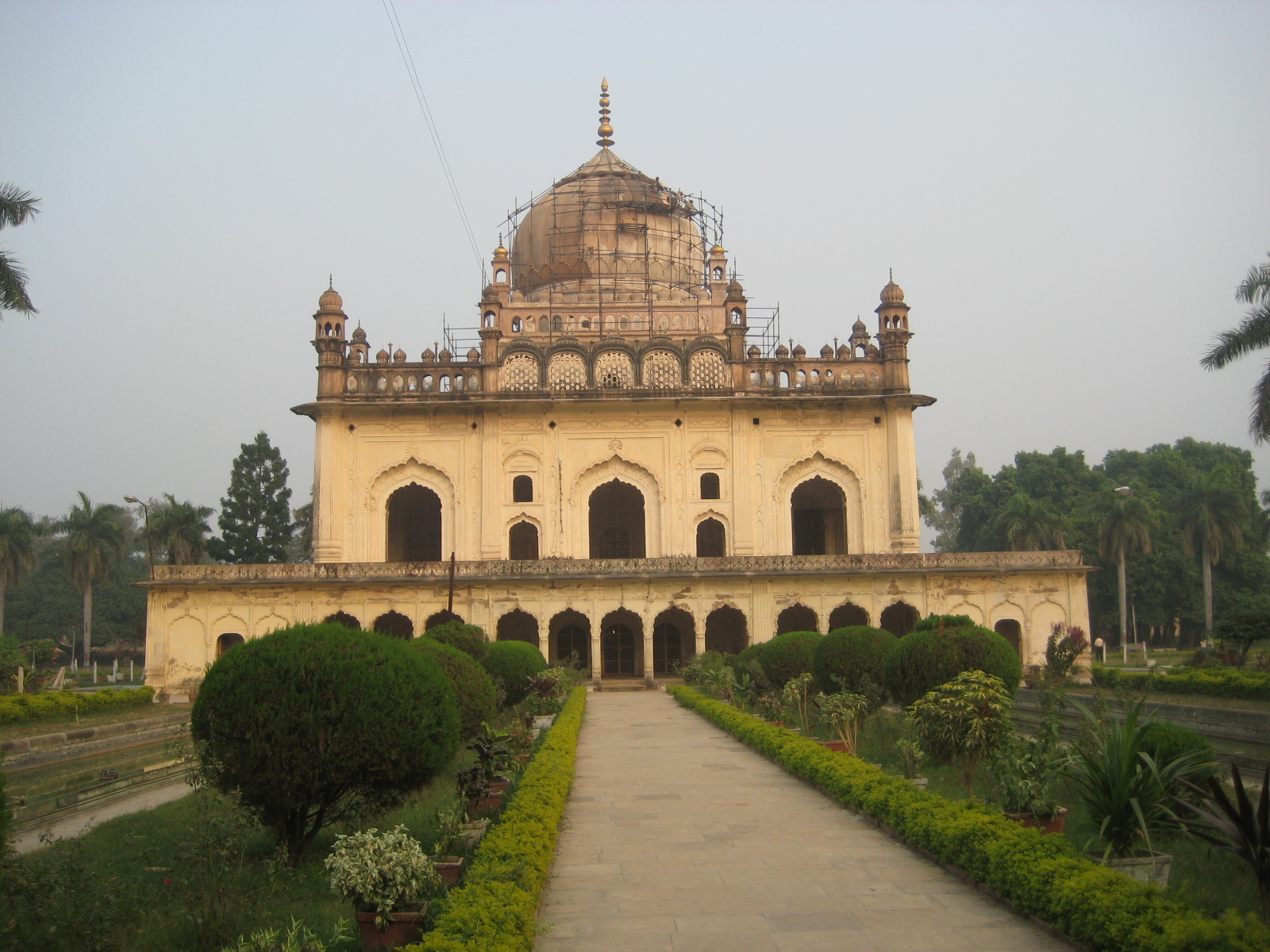
Gulab Bari, the tomb of Shuja-ud-Daula, husband of Bahu Begum.

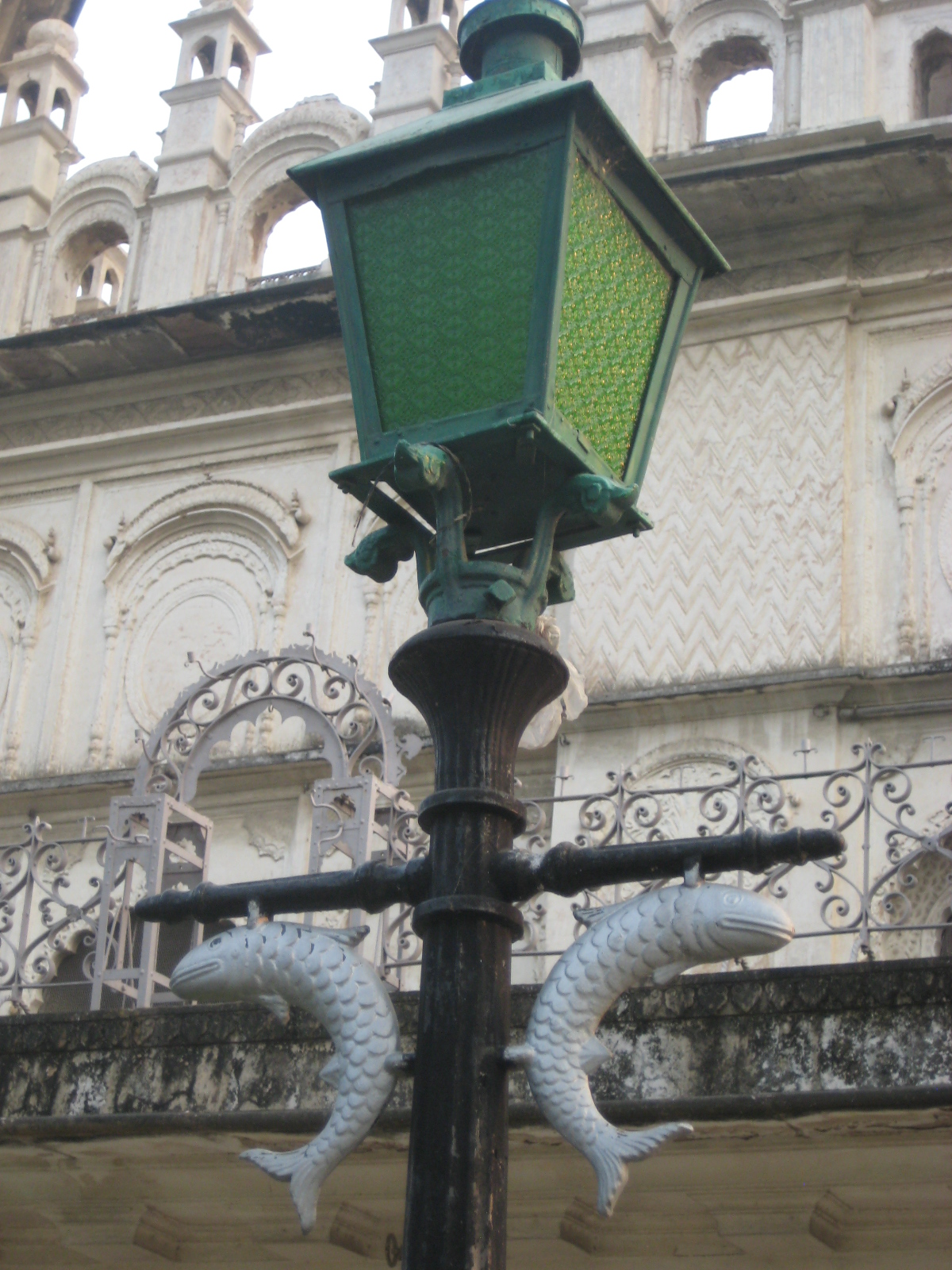
A lamppost with the royal fish motif inside Maqbara

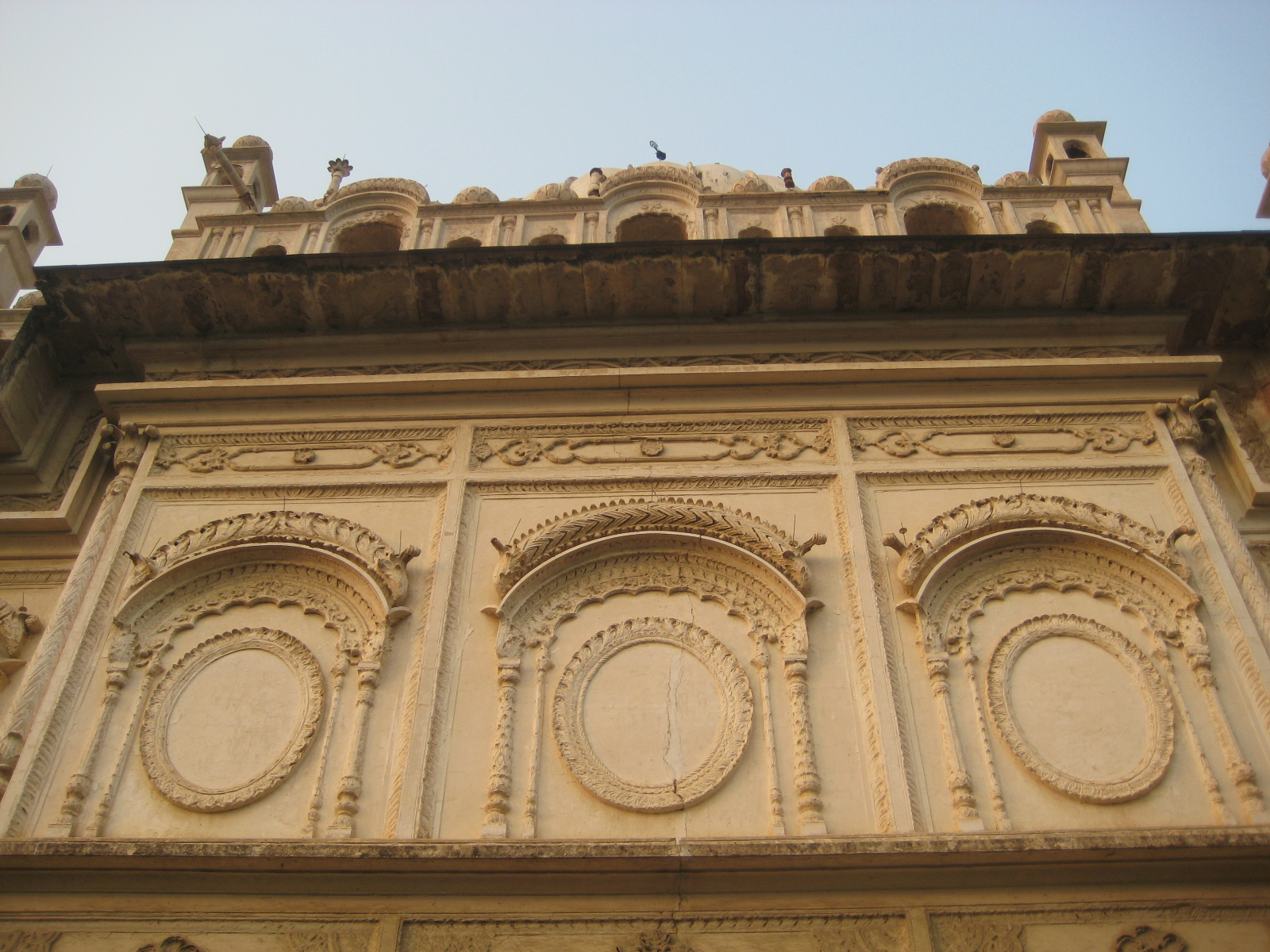
Facade of Maqbara

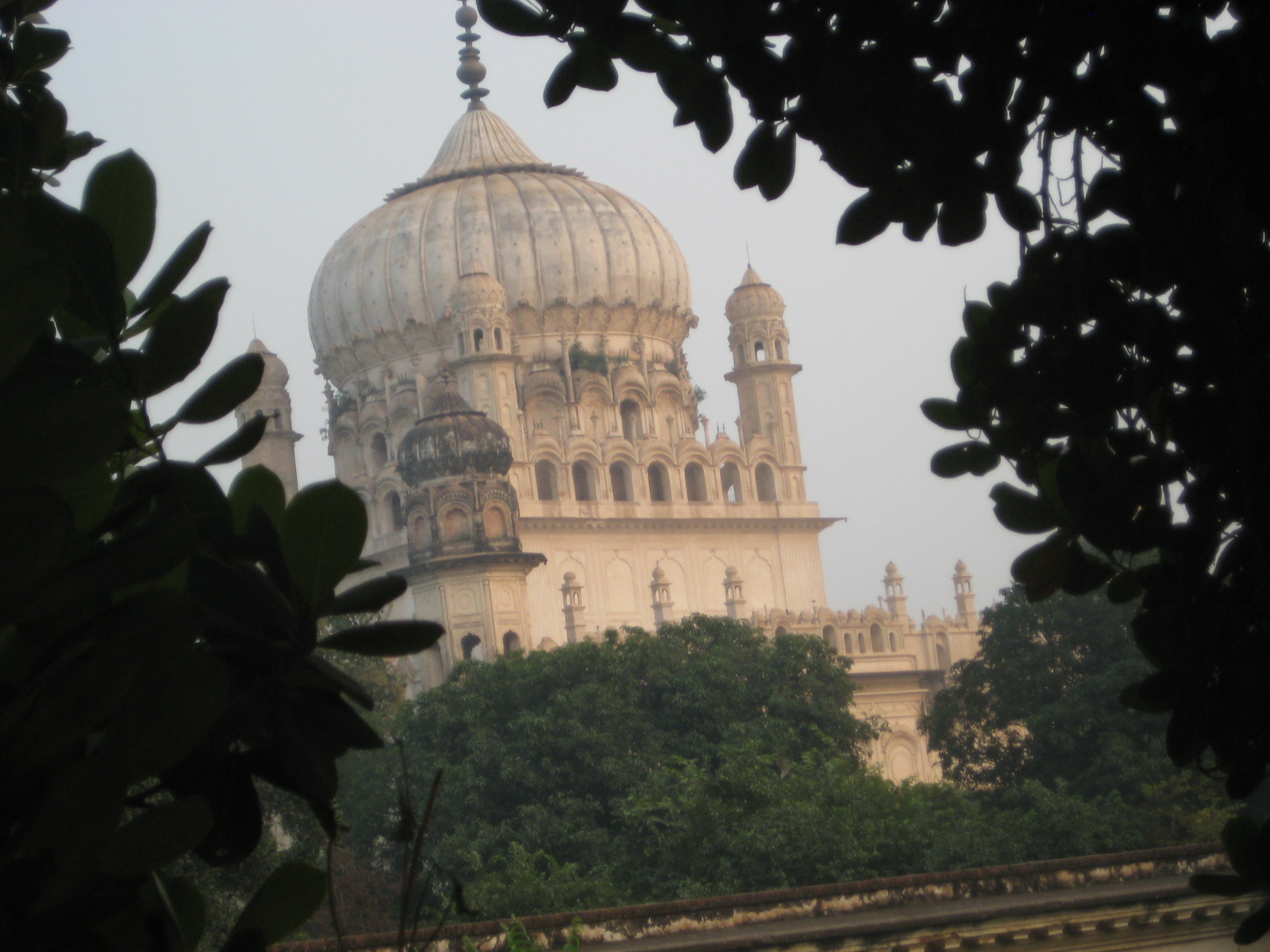
Another view of Maqbara

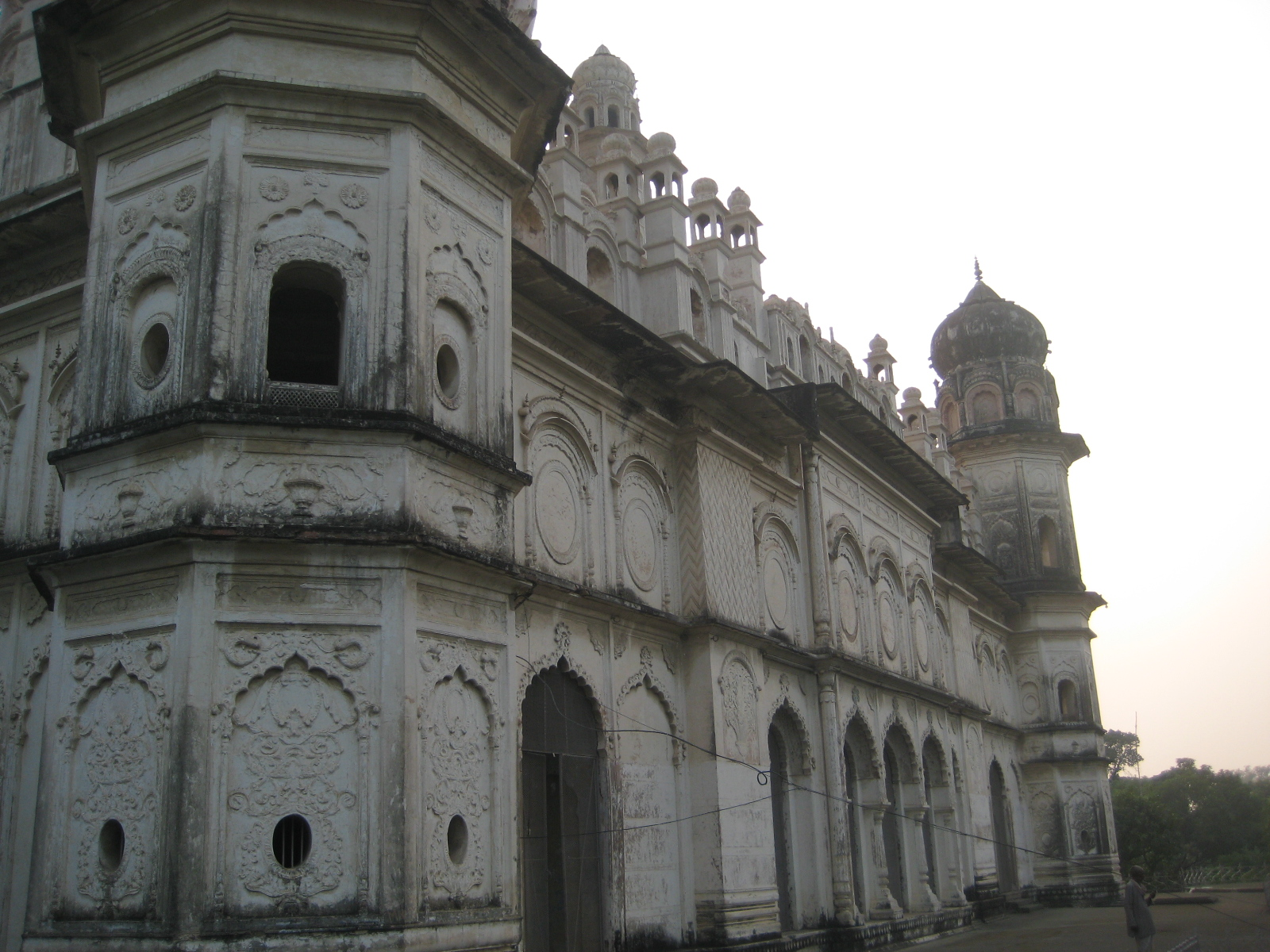
Ramparts of Maqbara

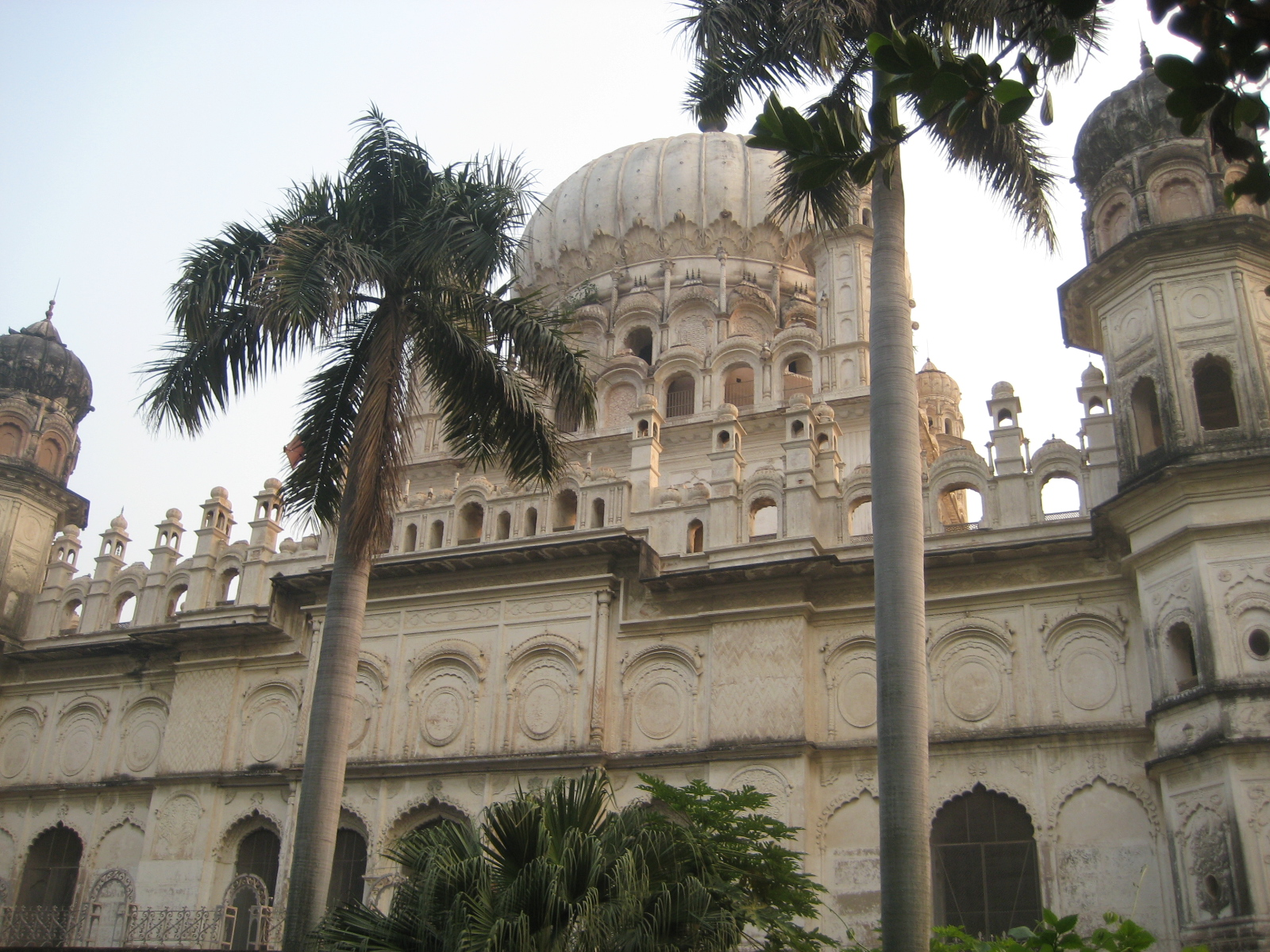
Main entrance way of Maqbara, lined with palm trees

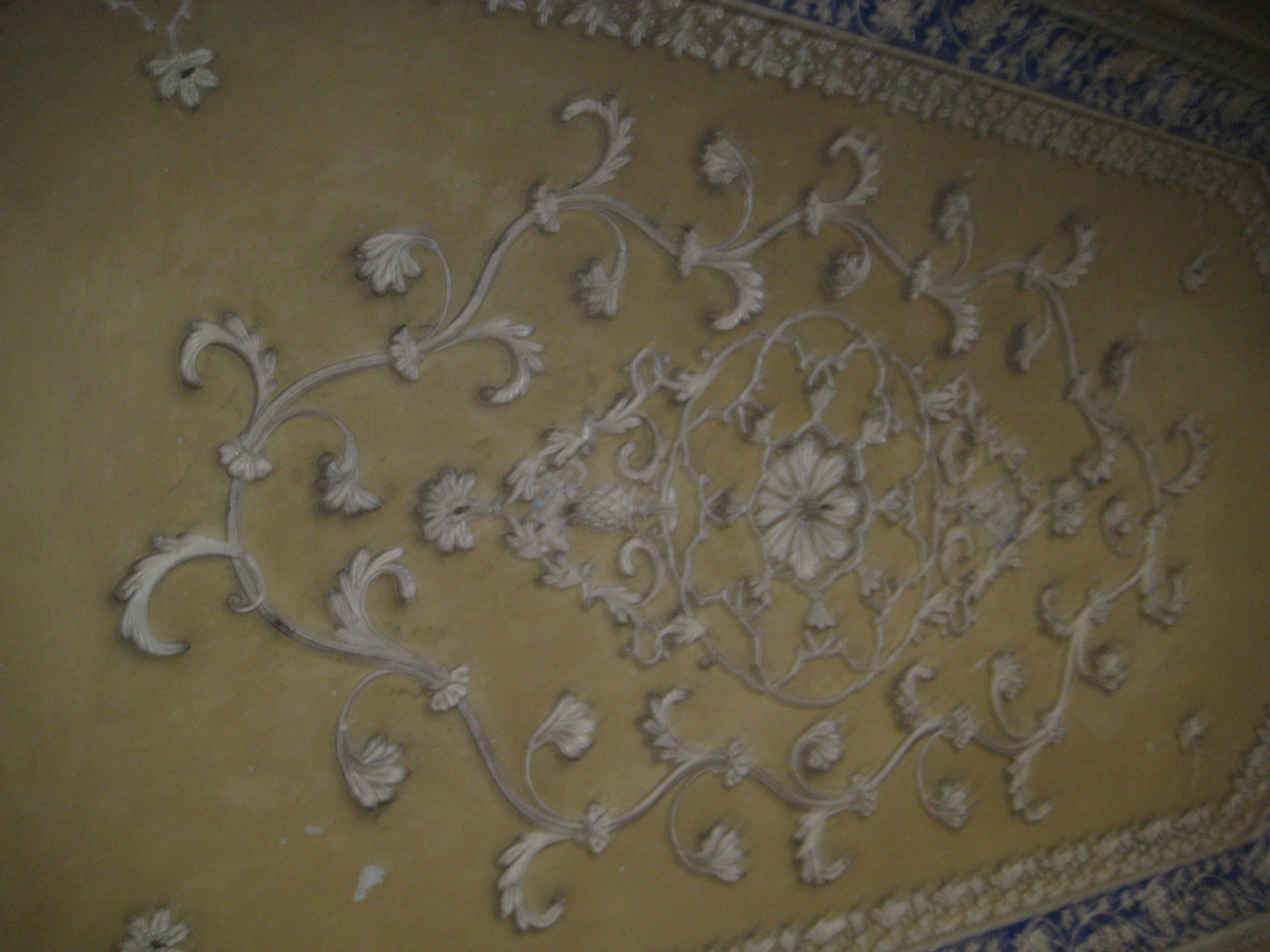
Stucco work on the ceiling of Maqbara

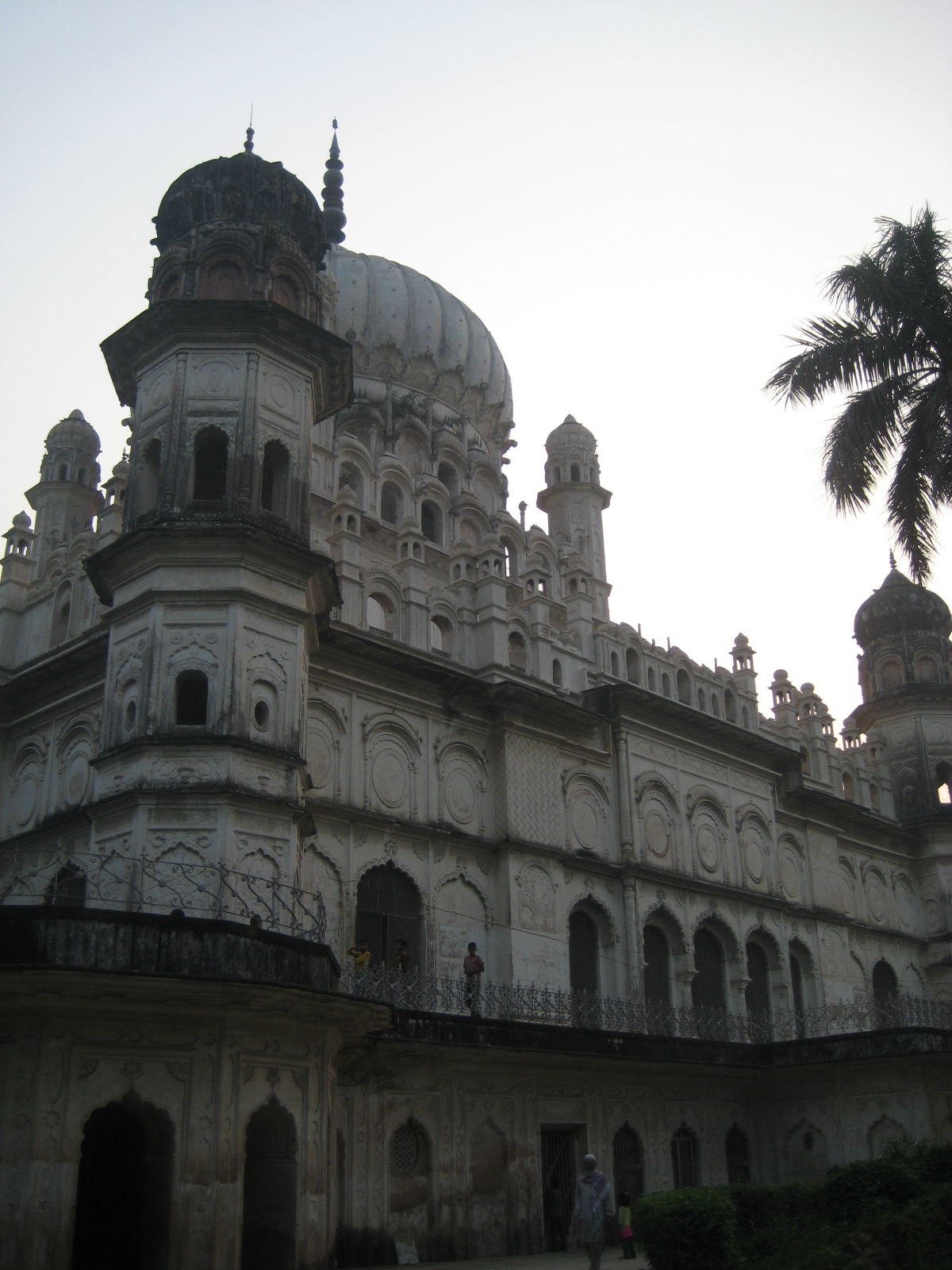
Exterior facade of Maqbara

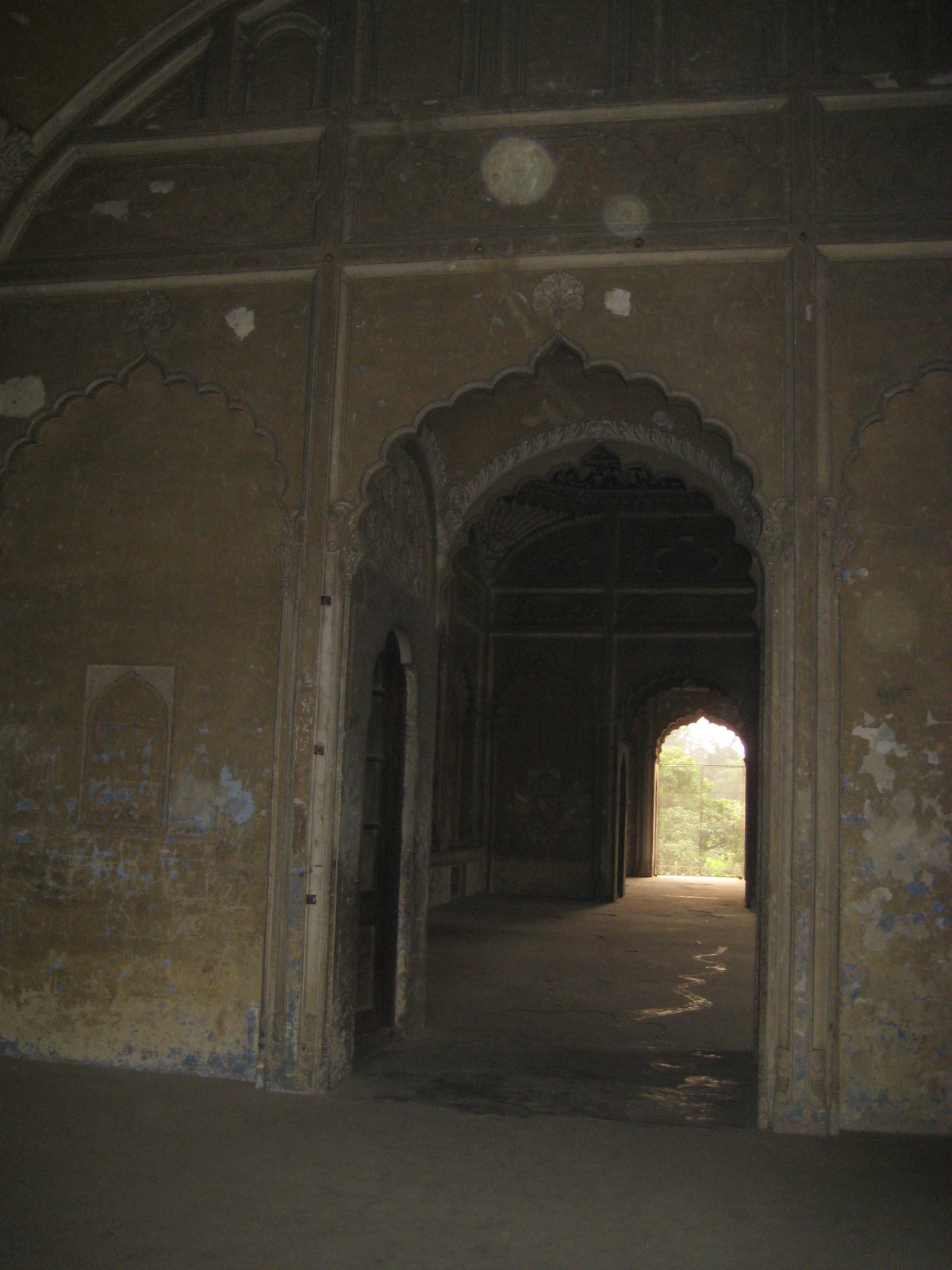
Arched entrance to the halls inside Maqbara.

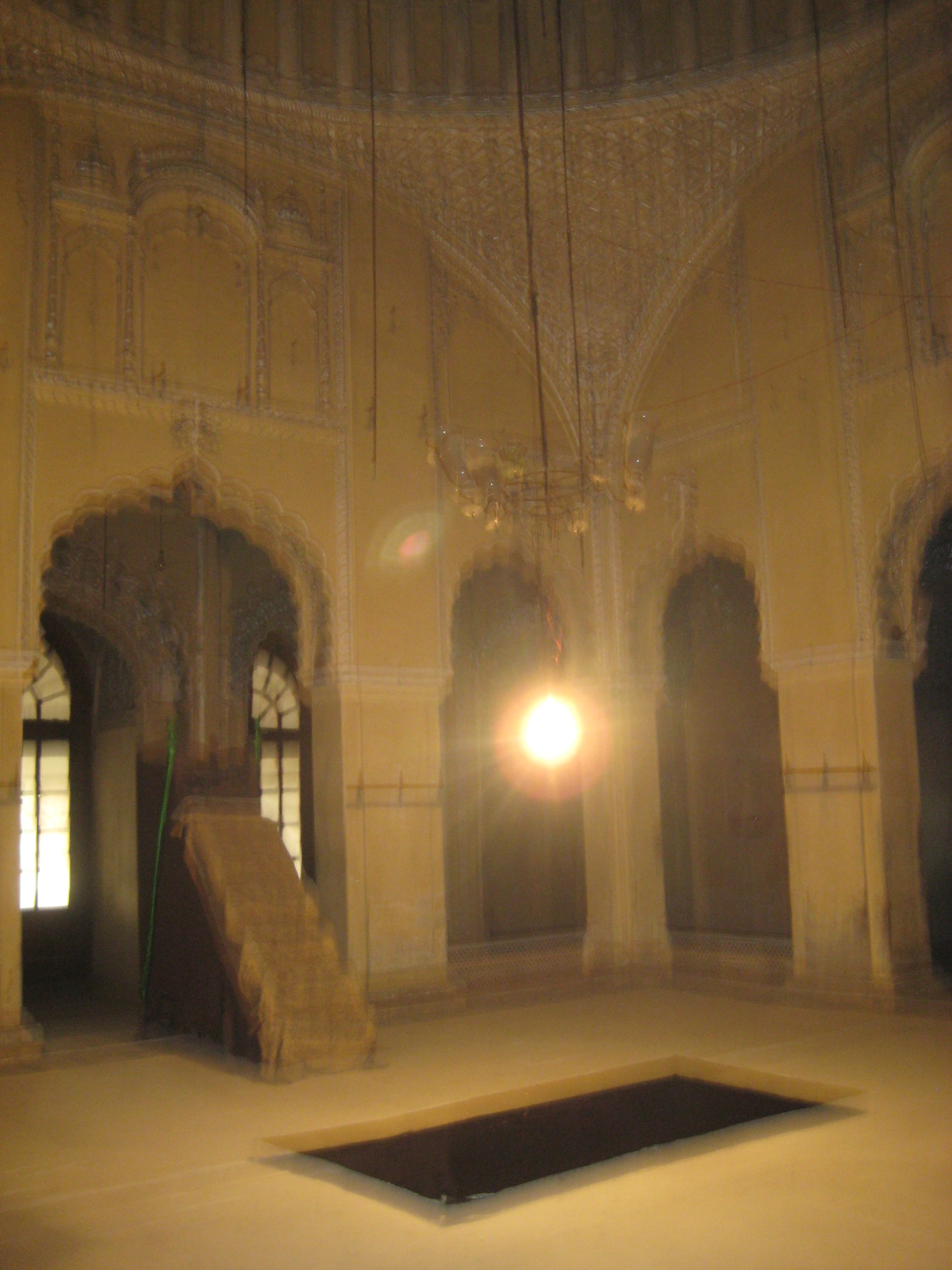
A hall inside Maqbara, where 'Majlis' (religious gatherings) are held.

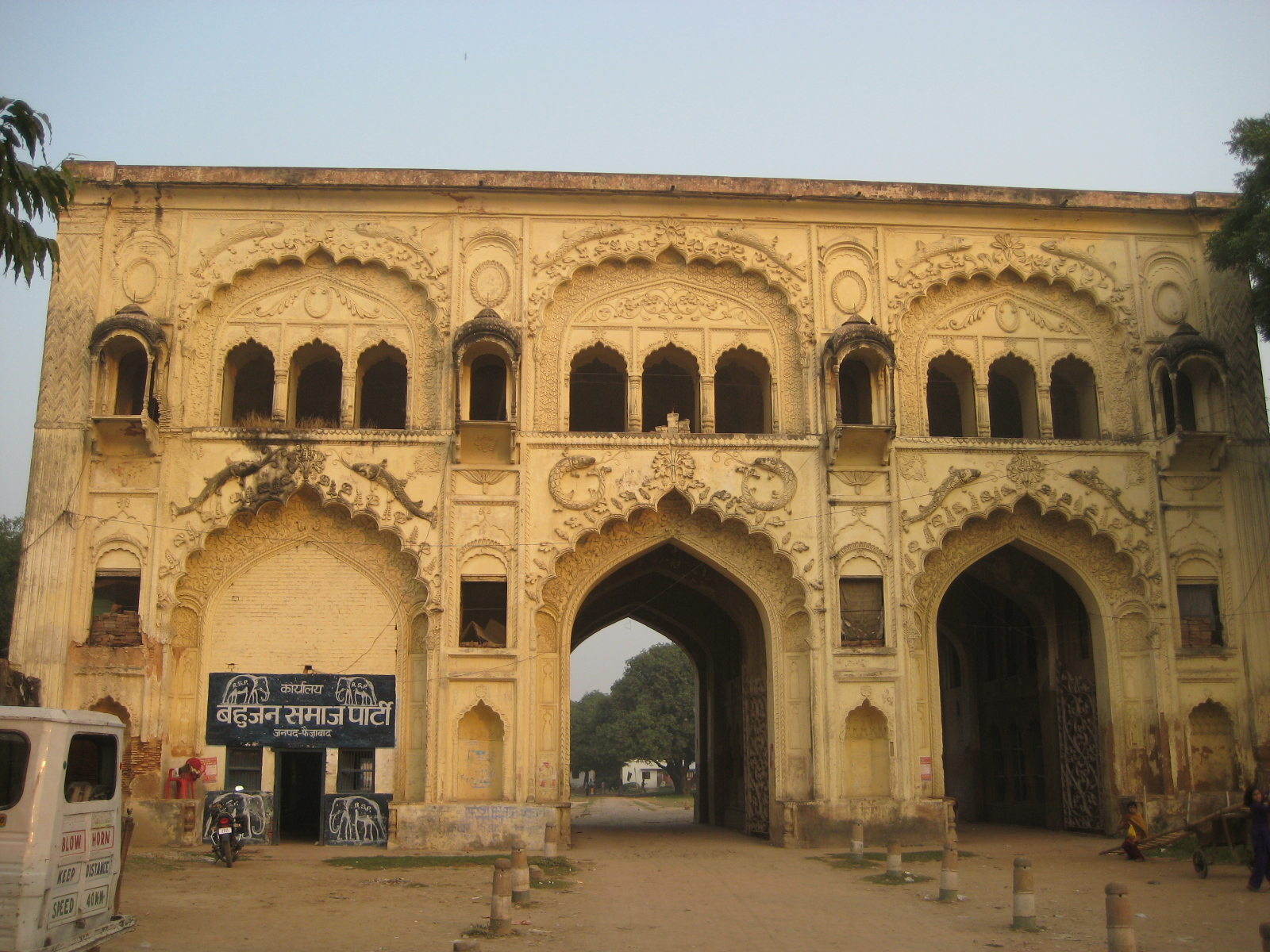
Photograph taken of the main gateway entrance of Bahu Begum ka Maqbara in Nov 2010.

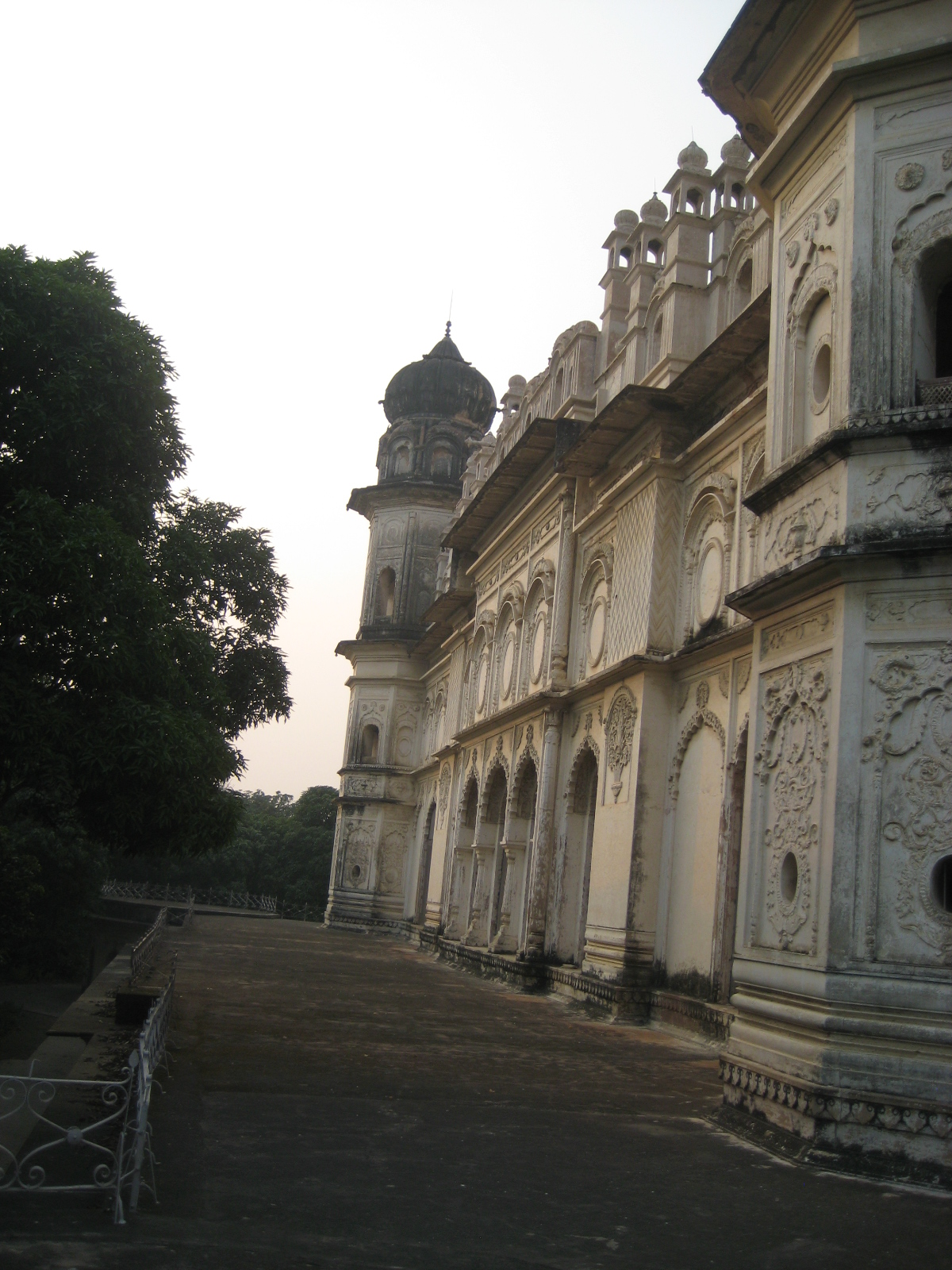
Maqbara
