= Begum =

Turkic honorific title for females

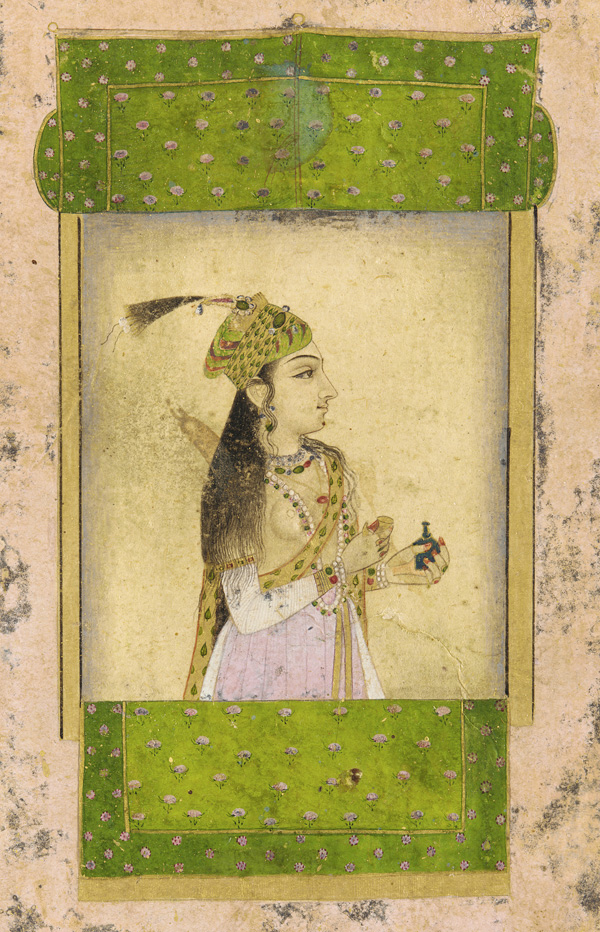
Begum Malika-uz-Zamani, wife of the Mughal Emperor Muhammad Shah.

Begum (also Begüm, Bagum, Begim, Begom, Begam, Baigum or Beygum) is an honorific title from Central and South Asia, often used by leading women in society, including royals, aristocrats, first ladies and prime ministers. It is the feminine equivalent of the title baig or bey, which in Turkic languages means "higher official". It usually refers to the wife or daughter of a beg. The related form begzada (daughter of a beg) also occurs.

In the Indian subcontinent, particularly in Delhi, Hyderabad, Sindh, Punjab, Khyber Pakhtunkhwa and Bengal, begum has been adapted for use as an honorific for Muslim women of high social status, accomplishment, or rank, as in English language the title "Lady" or "Dame" is used.

== Title ==
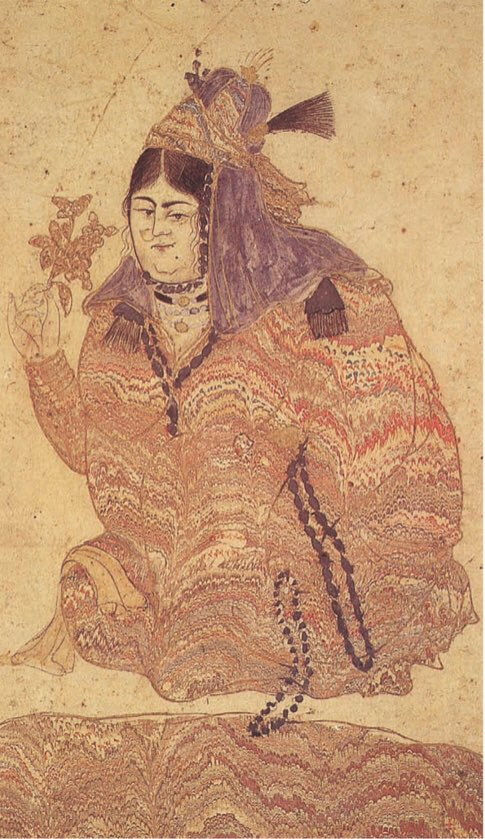
A Begum inscribed Hur Khanum Mughlani, Deccan, ca.1625

== In modern society ==
Colloquially, the term is also used in Uzbekistan, India, Pakistan and Bangladesh by Muslim men to refer to their own wives, daughters, sisters or as an honorific address to a married or widowed woman.

In Bangladesh the term has been used for the titles of current and former First Lady of Bangladesh e.g. Begum Khaleda Zia, Begum Fazilatunnesa Mujib and Begum Rowshan Ershad. It has also been used to refer to women of high social status such as philanthropists, activists, authors and many others such as Begum Rokeya and Begum Sufia Kamal. Khaleda Zia and Sheikh Hasina, who have alternated as Prime Ministers of Bangladesh since 1991, are nicknamed "the battling begums".

The term became well known in the West, especially in the French-speaking world, due to Jules Verne's 1879 novel The Begum's Millions.

The term had earlier become known in Great Britain during the impeachment and Parliamentary trial of Warren Hastings, former Governor-General of India, which lasted from 1787 until 1795. One of the major charges against Hastings was that he had unjustly confiscated land (and thus taxes) belonging to the "Begums of Oudh" (the mother and grandmother of Asaf-Ud-Dowlah, Nawab of Oudh).

Begumpet is one of the major commercial and residential suburbs of the city of Hyderabad, India. Begumpet stands on land given by the sixth Nizam of Hyderabad (in office: 1869-1911) to his daughter as her wedding present when she married a Paigah noble.

Members of the Pakistani community of Toronto refer to Mississauga, Ontario, Canada (a suburb of Toronto) as Begumpura ("Ladies' Town"). Mississauga has a large Pakistani immigrant community and many husbands work in the Persian Gulf and Saudi Arabia while their wives and children live in Mississauga.

Among the Nizari Ismaili people, the title is also used as the official style of the consort of their imam, the Aga Khan.

== See also ==
- Khanum
- Khatun
