= Polier =

Polier is a surname. Notable people with the name include:

- Antoine-Noé de Polier de Bottens (1713–1783), Swiss Protestant theologian and pastor
- Louise Polier de Corcelles (1726–1796), Swiss amateur artist known for her correspondence
- Adolphe de Polier (1795–1830), French officer in the service of the Russian Empire
- Antoine Polier (1741–1795), Swiss army officer and art collector
- Jacques von Polier (born 1979), French designer based in Russia
- Justine W. Polier (1903–1987), American lawyer, the first woman Justice in New York
- Marie-Elisabeth Polier (1742–1817), Swiss journalist and translator
- Shad Polier (1906–1976), American lawyer and civic leader
