= Mihr Chand =

18th-century Indian miniature painter

- Born: 1730s or 1740s
- Known for: Colonel Polier watching a nautch
- Patrons: Shuja-ud-Daula, Antoine Polier

Mihr Chand (born c. 1730s or 1740s) was a prolific painter in Mughal India. He was active in the second half of the 18th century in Faizabad, Delhi and Lucknow.

Mihr Chand was born in the 1730s or 1740s and at first worked under Shuja-ud-Daula, the Nawab of Awadh. In the 1770s he became the head of the art workshop of Antoine Polier, a Swiss army officer and art collector and from this time onwards worked almost exclusively for his new patron. During this time he assembled many muraqqas for Polier, which are now known as Polier albums. After Polier left India in January 1788, no further information on Mihr Chand is known.

Works of Mihr Chand are contained in many museums, especially in the Museum of Islamic Art in Berlin. The art historian Malini Roy considers Mihr Chand to be "one of the pre-eminent artists to have flourished at the Nawabi courts of Awadh, in Faizabad and Lucknow". In art history, Mihr Chand is known for his mix of different motifs especially of Islamic and Hindu origin, as well as his copies of Persian, Indian and European paintings, with the scholar Terence McInerney noting that Mihr Chand embodied "the delicious schizophrenia of the Faizabad years".

Works of Mihr Chand can fetch high prices at auction; an important folio was sold at Christie's in 2025 for £2,429,000.

== Biography ==
=== Early life ===
A painting (RP-T-1993-173) by Ganga Ram, possibly the father of Mihr Chand

Little is known about the early life of Mihr Chand. According to the art historian Malini Roy, he was born in the 1730s or 1740s and was instructed in the art of painting by his father or another senior artist during his early years. The long form of Mihr Chand's signature suggest that a Ganga Ram was his father. The literature has produced two artists, both named Ganga Ram, as his possible father but scholarship by Malini Roy concluded in 2009 that "[t]he lack of concrete evidence to connect [him] to either of these artists makes it difficult to authenticate the artist's origins". John Seyller, a fellow art historian, disagreed in 2025 and identified the Ganga Ram who painted a miniature of Akbar holding up a turban ornament (now part of the collection of the Rijksmuseum [RP-T-1993-173]), as his father.

=== Faizabad ===
Mihr Chand worked from c. 1765 in Faizabad under Shuja-ud-Daula, the Nawab of Awadh from 1754 to 1775. Whether he was employed by Jean Baptiste Joseph Gentil, a French military man in the service of Shuja-ud-Daula, during this time is disputed. It is, however, certain that Mihr Chand had access to the collection of Gentil and copied some of Gentil's paintings, with the copies later included in Polier albums.

Antoine Polier, a Swiss army officer and art collector active in India, joined the court of Shuja-ud-Daula in 1773 as a surveyor and architect. Mihr Chand became the head of Polier's workshop and according to Malini Roy he "began to work almost exclusively for his new patron for the remainder of his career"; most of the information about Mihr Chand's life comes from his involvement with Polier. The Ijaz-i Arsalani, the Persian letters of Polier, contain many references to him. The earliest reference in the letters is dated 26 December 1773 and Mihr Chand is addressed as "a painter in Faizabad", "the painter of the sarkar" or "Mehrchand". Mihr Chand was paid a monthly salary of 60 rupees by Polier.

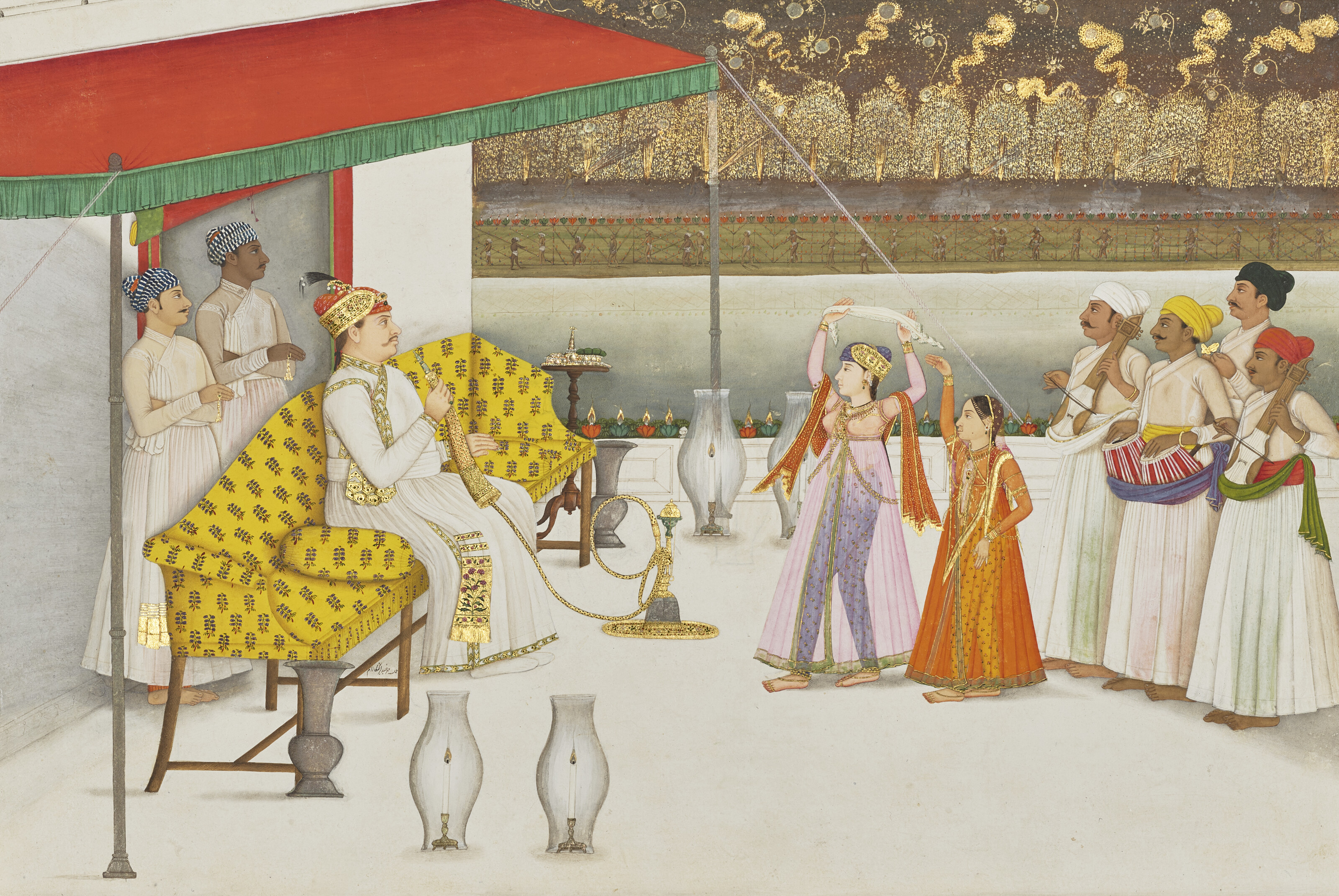
Colonel Polier watching a nautch by Mihr Chand

Polier commissioned Mihr Chand for various projects: he had him paint portraits of Shuja-ud-Daula imitating works of the English painter Tilly Kettle and had him craft a painting of himself watching a dance ("Colonel Polier watching a nautch"). The main task of Mihr Chand was assembling his own works and works of other artists into muraqqas or albums, the Polier albums. Malini Roy considers the painting Colonel Polier watching a nautch to be Mihr Chand's most important work; it was sold for £2,429,000 at Christie's in 2025. In a letter dated 18 July 1774 Polier remarked on the painting's production, giving insight into the collaboration between patron and artist:

I have learnt from Mr. Martin's letter that you are preparing a painting of the dance. I instruct you to suspend the work for the moment. Instead prepare a halfsize portrait of Didar Bakhsh [...]. After you have finished this, prepare a draft [...] of the painting of the dance [...]. I will see the draft when I come back and then you can finalise it as per my instructions.

— Antoine Polier, 18 July 1774

=== Delhi ===
Polier joined the court of Shah Alam II, the Mughal emperor, and moved to Delhi in March 1776. Polier's wealth increased significantly and he was able to expand his art workshop. He instructed Mihr Chand to come to Delhi writing in a letter dated 28 March 1776 that he should join him with "two other painters and one naqqāsh [decorator] who should be a good person, skilful and keen to accompany" him. Polier further elaborated that "[i]f the naqqāsh is not willing" Mihr Chand should let him go, because "[w]e have a good naqqāsh here". In a second letter dated 26 April 1776 he reminded Mihr Chand to "keep all the albums [...] and [...] [calligraphic specimens] in one box [...] so that they are safe from the dust and do not get damaged in transit". Mihr Chand joined Polier in Delhi in June 1776 and evidence exists that he was employed by Polier from this year to November 1779.

=== Lucknow ===
Lucknow became the capital of Awadh in 1775, and as Polier had regained his position as an architect at the Awadhi court in 1780, he moved there in the same year. No firm evidence of a relocation of Mihr Chand's workshop for Polier to Lucknow exists. It is however certain, that Mihr Chand met Warren Hastings, the first English Governor-General of India, in Lucknow who watched him finishing a seal with his machinery in 1784. Friederike Weis, a German art historian, suggests that Mihr Chand managed Polier's workshop from c. 1773 until c. 1785, which would mean that he continued to run Polier's workshop during Polier's Lucknow years.

=== Final years ===
In January 1788, Polier left India from Calcutta and returned to his hometown of Lausanne in September 1788. He was murdered on 9 February 1795 near Avignon. After Polier's departure from India, nothing more is known about Mihr Chand. Malini Roy speculates that he may have retired or died.

== Work ==
=== Albums with signed paintings and individual signed paintings ===
When Mihr Chand signed his work, he often used the signature ʿamal-i Mihr Chand pisar-i Gangā Rām (work of Mihr Chand, son of Ganga Ram), which has been identified as his extended signature, while other paintings only contain the short signature ʿamal-i Mihr Chand (work of Mihr Chand). 27 paintings are known to have been signed in the long form way.

The known works signed by Mihr Chand are listed below:

Signed works by Mihr Chand
Works with extended signature (ʿamal-i Mihr Chand pisar-i Gangā Rām)
Type and inventory number	Museum and location	Polier album number	Image	Paintings signed by Mihr Chand	Source
Albums
Polier album (I 4594)	Museum of Islamic Art, Berlin	9	Folio 27r	Folios 1v (fakirs sitting in front of a hermitage), 2r (Nilgau), 6r (Shiv Puja), 8r (a Mughal lady), 9r (Bhairava Ragini), 10r (a noble on an elephant), 16r (an unidentified portrait), 18r (Shuja ud-Daula holding a bow), 21r (Shayista Khan), 25r (Humayun), 27r (Venus), 28r (a sheikh sitting under a tree with an ascetic and musicians), 30r (a prince celebrating the festival of Holi with the women of the harem), 32r (Shah Alam II), 38r (Shuja ud-Daula), 39v (a garden scene) and 40r (a dervish receiving a visitor) [17 paintings]	(Note: Roy (2009) gives a contrary view on recto and verso.)
Polier album (I 4595)	Museum of Islamic Art, Berlin	10 (possibly)	Folio 22r	Folios 2r (a woman holding a tambura), 22r (Venus) and 35r (Vishnu and Lakshmi with Garuda) [3 paintings]	
Polier album (I 4596)	Museum of Islamic Art, Berlin	3	Folio 18r	Folios 18r (Shuja ud-Daula with his ten sons) and 29r (a prince meeting Sheikh Shir Muhammad Kawwal) [2 paintings]	
Polier album (Indian Drawings 13)	John Rylands Research Institute and Library, Manchester	8 (possibly)		Folios 3v (Asaf al-Dawla) and 4v (a military camp in front of a castle modelled on a European painting) [2 paintings]	
Phillipps album (Ms. 6730)	Dispersed after an auction by Sotheby's on 27 November 1974; lot 757 (EA1993.11) is now in the Ashmolean Museum, Oxford	—	Lot 723	Lots 723 (Colonel Polier watching a nautch) (Note: The painting was auctioned off again in 2025 by Christie's as lot 51 of the auction "Exceptional Paintings from the Personal Collection of Prince & Princess Sadruddin Aga Khan".) and 757 (Shuja ud-Daula) [2 paintings]	
Individual leaf
Nawab Amir al-Umara Zabita Khan (S1986.416)	National Museum of Asian Art, Washington, D.C.	—		1 painting (Zabita Khan)	
Works with short signature (ʿamal-i Mihr Chand)
Albums
Polier album (I 5063)	Museum of Asian Art, Berlin	17	Folio 14v	Folio 14v (Farrukhsiyar) [inscribed to Mihr Chand]	
Individual leaves
Imaginary courtesan (Johnson Album 66,2)	British Library, London	—		1 painting (an imaginary courtesan)	
Nawab Asaf al-Dawla (Add.Or.4390)	British Library, London	—		1 painting (Asaf-ud-Daula) [signed on the frame]	

=== Reception ===
Ernst Kühnel in 1960 who introduced Mihr Chand to academic art history

Mihr Chand was first introduced to art history in 1922 by Ernst Kühnel, who later became the director of the Museum of Islamic Art, Berlin. Kühnel argued that Mihr Chand was the "most remarkable exponent" of the eclectic movement of the 18th century art scene in India, noting that he "was surely unrivalled [...] in his receptiveness to the most diverse influences", explaining that Mihr Chand "juxtaposed purely Islamic and purely Hindu motifs [...]", that "he copied or adapted Persian, Indian and European models from the 16th to the 18th centuries, and also created his own portraits, landscapes and compositions in various styles [...]." Terence McInerney, an independent scholar, emphasised a similar point in 2019, writing that Mihr Chand embodied "the delicious schizophrenia of the Faizabad years" producing skillful copies of Tilly Kettle's works as well as "high-style Mughal works".

Writing in 2010, Malini Roy recognised Mihr Chand as "one of the pre-eminent artists to have flourished at the Nawabi courts of Awadh, in Faizabad and Lucknow, during the second half of the eighteenth century."
