= List of Polier albums =

List of albums of Indian painting and calligraphy assembled for Antoine Polier

Owner's inscription for Antoine Polier (Museum of Islamic Art, Ident. No. I 4594, fol. 40v)

The Polier albums are the albums, mostly of Indian paintings and calligraphy, that Antoine Polier (1741–1795), a Swiss architect and art collector active in Mughal India, numbered as volumes of his own collection, together with albums made on his behalf as gifts for his European friends. (Note: Not listed here are other albums owned by Polier which are not numbered or commissioned by him or on his behalf, such as the calligraphy albums now in the Bibliothèque nationale de France (Supplément persan 390 and 391), which bear his ex-libris dated 1787.) Polier commissioned many of these albums, notably from a workshop run by Mihr Chand, an Indian miniature painter, from c. 1773 onwards. When Polier returned to his hometown of Lausanne, Switzerland, in September 1788, he brought more than 30 albums of Indian paintings with him. Of these, 25 albums were personally numbered by Polier. 21 of these 25 albums are known to be extant, with 11 of them in Berlin museums and two dispersed.

Polier is considered an "unparalleled figure" among collectors of muraqqas – albums with paintings and calligraphy – during the second half of the 18th century. Today, individual folios of his albums fetch high auction prices, with a single folio sold for £2,429,000 at Christie's in 2025 (Colonel Polier's nautch), a folio from the dispersed album known as Phillipps Ms 6730.

The Polier albums have to be distinguished from the unillustrated Indian manuscripts of Polier, which also carry a catalogued Polier number and were mainly purchased by Edward Ephraim Pote (1750–1832). They form the Pote Collection at King's College, Cambridge, and Eton College, both now on long-term deposit at the Cambridge University Library.

== Primary textual sources ==
As of 2026 two primary textual sources for the number of Polier albums are known: A letter dated 20 March 1789 of Michel-Vincent Brandoin (1733–1790), a Swiss painter, to William Beckford (1760–1844), a British writer. According to this letter, Polier kept 35 albums in his Lausanne home. An undated notice with a sale offer of 38 volumes of Indian paintings (38 volumes de peintures indiennes) in French, now archived in the Bibliothèque nationale de France, is the second primary source. (Note: The transcribed notice can be found here: Weis 2025, pp. 183–186) This notice lists the 25 numbered albums with short descriptions and furthermore mentions 13 volumes with images of natural history (volumes d’histoire naturelle).

== Numbered Polier albums ==
The 25 numbered Polier albums are listed below. Friederike Weis, a German scholar, reconstructed the numbering of these volumes using three types of evidence: On four albums (I. 4596 [Vol. 3], I. 4599 [Vol. 7], 1920,0917,0.133–153 [Vol. 12] and Indian Drawings 12 [Vol. 14]) the numbering is extant in Polier's own hand, one album (I. 4594 [Vol. 9]) carries a label on the back cover and the rest of the numbering is reconstructed using the undated French sale notice.

Polier's volume no. (muraqqa)	Shelfmark	Institution	Title inscribed by Polier	Example leaf	Number of folios	Dimensions	Dedication and signed paintings	Ref.
1? (muraqqa)	I. 4593	Museum of Islamic Art, Berlin	—		50 (of originally 60 folios?)	42.5 × 28.5 cm	Dedication on inner back cover.	
2? (muraqqa)	1920,0917,0.76–111 (formerly Add. 23,610)	British Museum, London	—		26 (of originally 60?)	42.6 × 29.0 cm	Dedication on inner back cover.	
3 (muraqqa)	I. 4596	Museum of Islamic Art, Berlin	Volume troisieme		30	50.0 × 36.5 cm	Dedicatory shamsa on fol. 30v. Fols. 18r and 29r are signed by Mihr Chand.	
4	Missing. Described in the undated French notice as a grand in/4° with about 50 ancient paintings of the same nature as volumes 1 and 2. Friederike Weis suggests that the album dispersed at Sotheby's on 27 November 1974 (lots 723–769 [Phillipps Ms 6730]) may be an assembly of remains of volume 4.							
5 (muraqqa)	I. 4601 and K 3431	Museum of Islamic Art, Berlin; Louvre, Paris	—	—	50 (49 + 1)	28.4 × 20.0 cm	—	
6? (muraqqa)	I. 4598	Museum of Islamic Art, Berlin	—		40	40.5 × 28.5 cm	Dedicatory shamsa on fol. 40v.	
7 (muraqqa)	I. 4599	Museum of Islamic Art, Berlin	Volume septieme	—	40	40.5 × 28.0 cm	Dedicatory shamsa on fol. 40v.	
8? (muraqqa)	Indian Drawings 13	John Rylands Research Institute and Library, Manchester	—	—	14 (fragment of 40?)	40.5 × 28.5 cm	Dedicatory shamsa on fol. 9r. Fols. 3v and 4v are signed by Mihr Chand.	
9 (muraqqa)	I. 4594	Museum of Islamic Art, Berlin	"No. 9." (on the back cover)		40	41.5 × 28.5 cm	Dedicatory shamsa on fol. 40v. Fols. 1v, 2r, 6r, 8r, 9r, 10r, 16r, 18r, 21r, 25r, 27r, 28r, 30r, 32r, 38r, 39v and 40r signed by Mihr Chand; fol. 36r signed by Dalchand; fol. 24r signed by Shivadas.	
10? (muraqqa)	I. 4595	Museum of Islamic Art, Berlin	—		36 (of originally 40?)	40.0 × 28.0 cm	Dedicatory shamsa on fol. 36v. Fols. 2r, 22r and 35r signed by Mihr Chand.	
11 or 15? (muraqqa)	I. 4597	Museum of Islamic Art, Berlin	—	—	40	40.0 × 28.0 cm	Empty shamsa on fol. 40v.	
11 or 15? (muraqqa)	Sotheby's, London, 12 December 1966, lots 1–34	Dispersed, present location unknown	—	—	34 (of originally 40?)	c. 37 × 26.5 cm	—	
12 (muraqqa)	1920,0917,0.133–153 (formerly Add. 23,609)	British Museum, London	Volume douzieme	—	21 (of originally 40)	40.7 × 29.6 cm	—	
13	Lost. Described in the undated French notice as eighteen folio miniatures forming part of a set of Ragamala paintings.							
14 (muraqqa)	Indian Drawings 12	John Rylands Research Institute and Library, Manchester	Volume quatorsieme	—	42 (of originally 40)	40.5 × 28.4 cm	—	
16	I 5062	Museum of Asian Art, Berlin	Volume seizième, Musique — nommé Raajmala		36	31 × 23.1 cm	—	
17 (muraqqa)	I 5063	Museum of Asian Art, Berlin	Genialogie [généalogie] des Empereurs		20 (of originally 21)	39.8 × 28.2 cm	Dedicatory shamsa on fol. 22v. Fol. 14v is ascribed to Mihr Chand.	
18	Lost. Described in the undated French notice together with volume 19, as a petit folio volume containing a collection of the finest and most sought-after examples of Persian and Arabic calligraphy by the greatest masters, assembled with the utmost care.							
19	Lost. Described in the undated French notice together with volume 18, as a petit folio volume containing a collection of the finest and most sought-after examples of Persian and Arabic calligraphy by the greatest masters, assembled with the utmost care.							
20	Missing. Described in the undated French notice as an in/4° long volume together with volumes 21 and 22 as containing a collection of full-length portraits from the life of Indian soldiers, sepoys and officers, male and female servants, craftsmen in their workshops, fakirs of various kinds, merchants, labourers and other common folk, as well as Indian palanquins, chariots and carriages, standards, etc.							
21?	583133i	Wellcome Collection, London	321. Domestiques et gens du Commun etc.		31	26.2 × 33.7 cm	—	
22?	583226i	Wellcome Collection, London	321. Faquirs Domestiques et gens du Comun [sic] Palanquins etc.		30	26.2 × 33.8 cm	—	
23 (muraqqa)	I 5005	Museum of Asian Art, Berlin	—		16	46.0 × 62.5 cm	Empty shamsa on fol. 16v.	
24	Or 4769	British Library, London	Drawings of Hindou Mythology, vol. 1	—	32	34.5 × 26 cm	—	
25	Or 4770	British Library, London	Drawings of Hindou Mythology, vol. 2	—	32	34.5 × 26 cm	—	
Unknown (perhaps an assembly of the missing volume 4 with calligraphy from volumes 18 and 19)	Sotheby's, London, 27 November 1974, lots 723–769 (Phillipps Ms 6730)	Dispersed; present location unknown	—		46	39.6 × 29.0 cm	Empty shamsa on the verso of lot 723. Lots 723 and 757 signed by Mihr Chand.	

== Other Polier albums ==
Three further albums were assembled on behalf of Polier for his European friends between 1784 and 1787.

Name or Shelfmark	Institution	Recipient	Example leaf	Number of folios	Dimensions	Ref.
MSL/1858/4765	National Art Library (Victoria and Albert Museum), London	William Jones; came into Warren Hastings' collection in 1784	—	29 (as catalogued)	—	
Persian MS 10	John Rylands Research Institute and Library, Manchester	William Jones, as a replacement for MSL/1858/4765	—	40	342 × 262 mm	
Lady Coote Album	Fine Arts Museums of San Francisco (1982.2.70.1 ff.); Harvard Art Museums, Cambridge, Massachusetts, U.S. (1953.48–50); San Diego Museum of Art (1990.414).	Susanna Coote (born Susanna Hutchinson, d. 1812), wife of Eyre Coote		12 (originally)	c. 45 × 61 cm	
