= Bibiyapur Kothi =

Coordinates: 26.8222°N 80.9819°E

Bibiapur Kothi
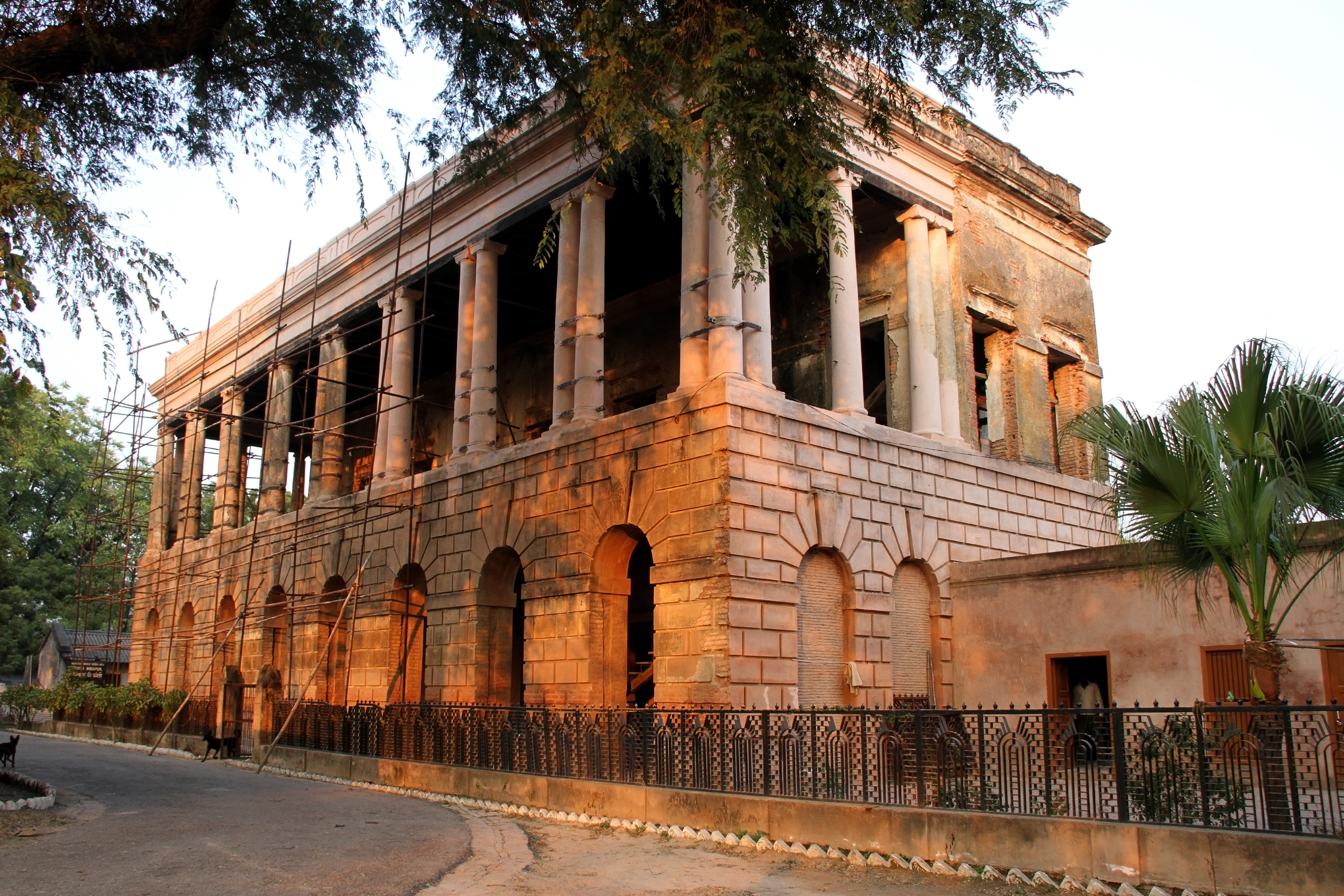
- Interactive map of the Bibiapur Kothi area

General information
- Status: preserved
- Type: Kothi
- Architectural style: Neo-classical
- Location: Bibiapur, Lucknow, India, Lucknow, India
- Completed: late 18th century
- Client: Asaf-ud-Daula
- Owner: Indian Army

Height
- Height: 2 stories

Technical details
- Material: stone
- Floor count: 2

Design and construction
- Architect: Antoine Polier
- Designations: protected site

Bibiyapur Kothi is a historic building in Lucknow, India. Built by Asaf-ud-Daula, Nawab of Awadh, the residence is now administered by the Indian Army.

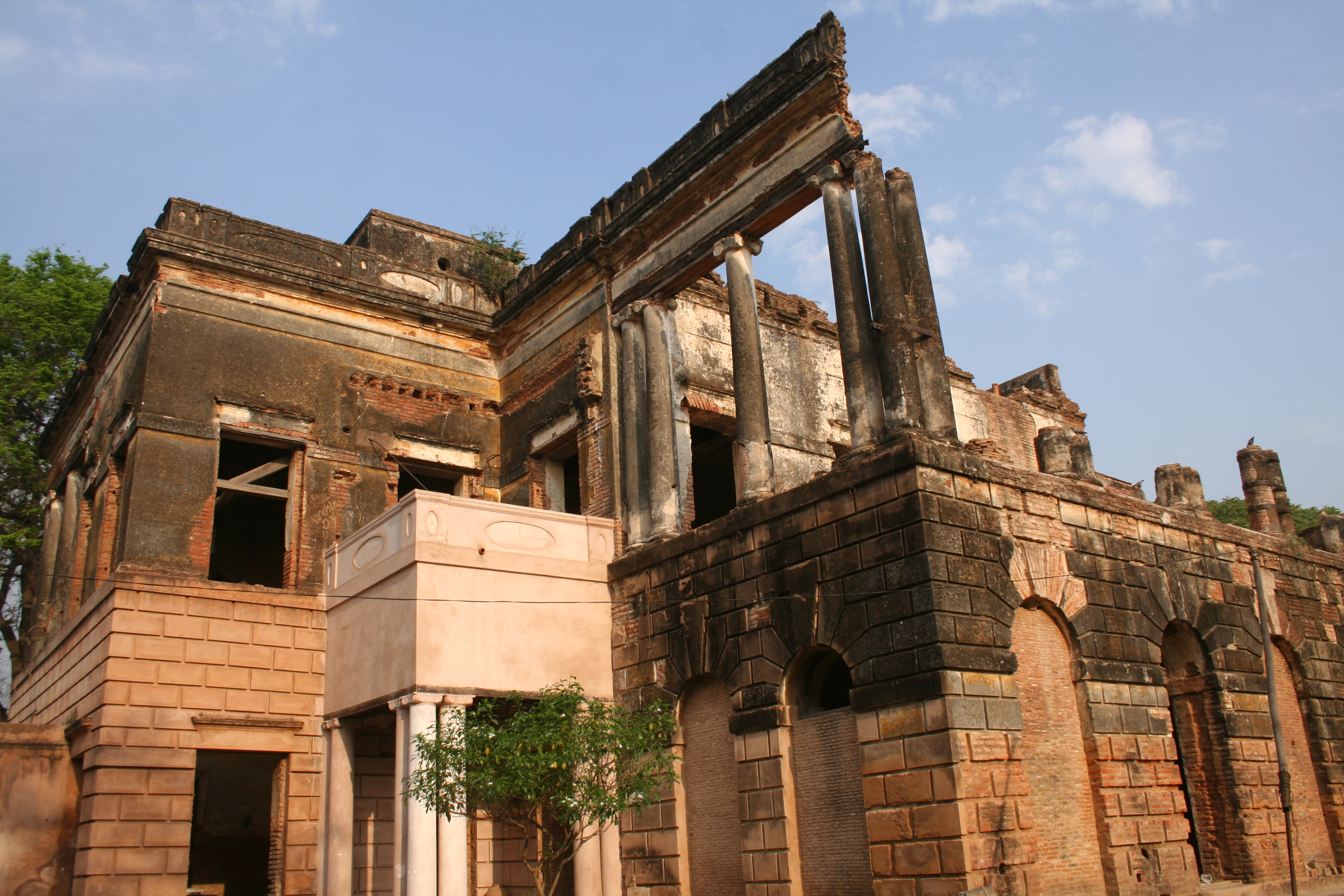
Another view of Bibiyapur House

== Description ==
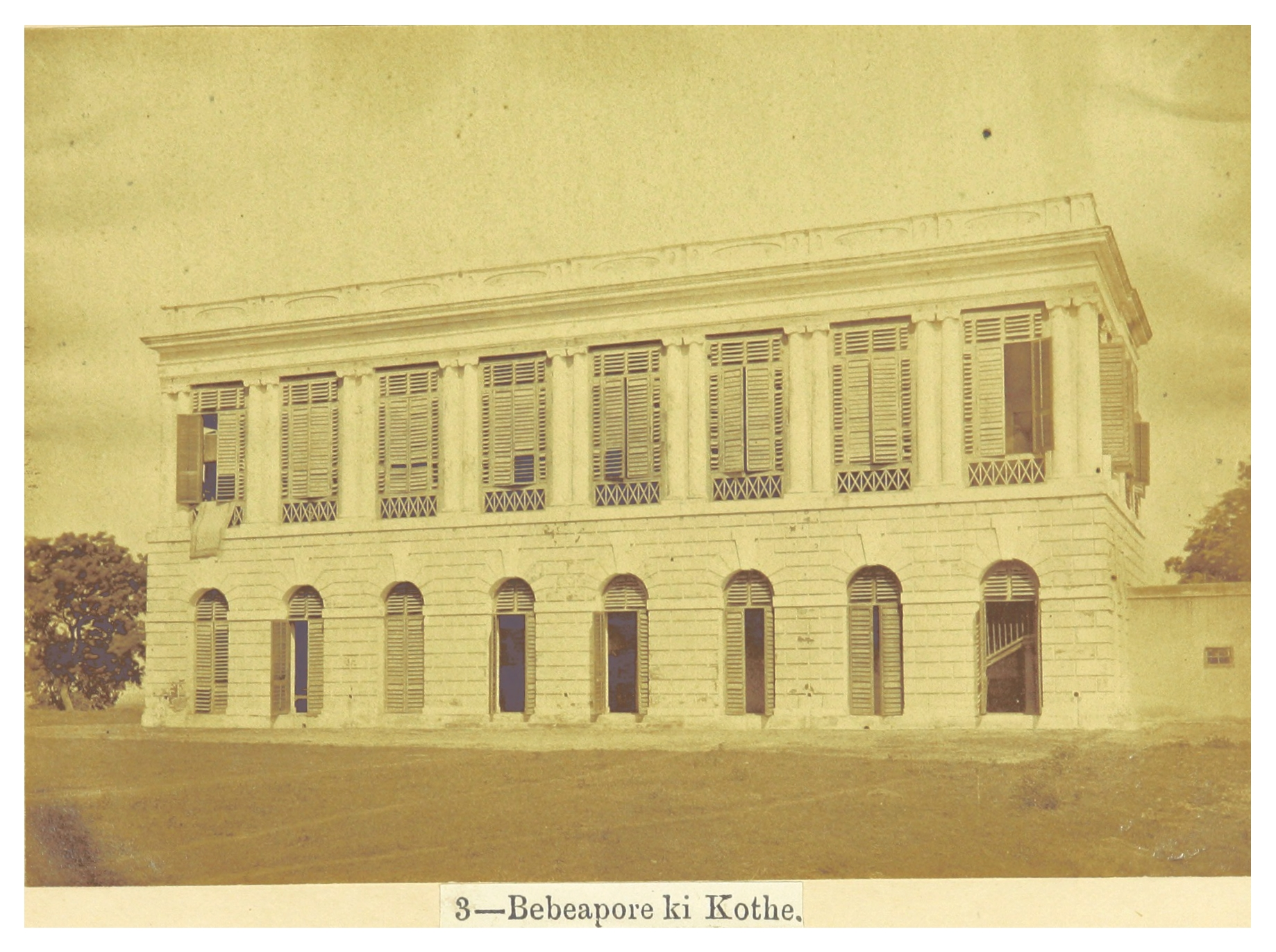
ca. 1874

The kothi at Bibyapur was built by Asaf-ud-Daula, Nawab of Awadh, in the late 18th century. The kothi is named after the nearby village of Bibiyapur and is located on the banks of the Gomti River. Designed by Antoine Polier in the neo-classical style, the residence was used as a country retreat, a place for the Nawab to escape pressures of royal court in nearby Lucknow. The building was better furnished than other residences owned by Asaf, and so was often visited by ladies of the royal court. The kothi remained in the royal family after Asaf-ud-Daula's death; in one notable instance, Wazir Ali Khan was placed under house arrest at the kothi by the British.

Following the dissolution of the Nawab of Awadh, the British government of India used the home to host military celebrations. It was declared a protected site in 1917. The residence became part of an army cantonment and is currently managed by the Indian army, though the public is allowed to visit the building.
