= Antoine Polier =

Swiss adventurer (1741–1795)

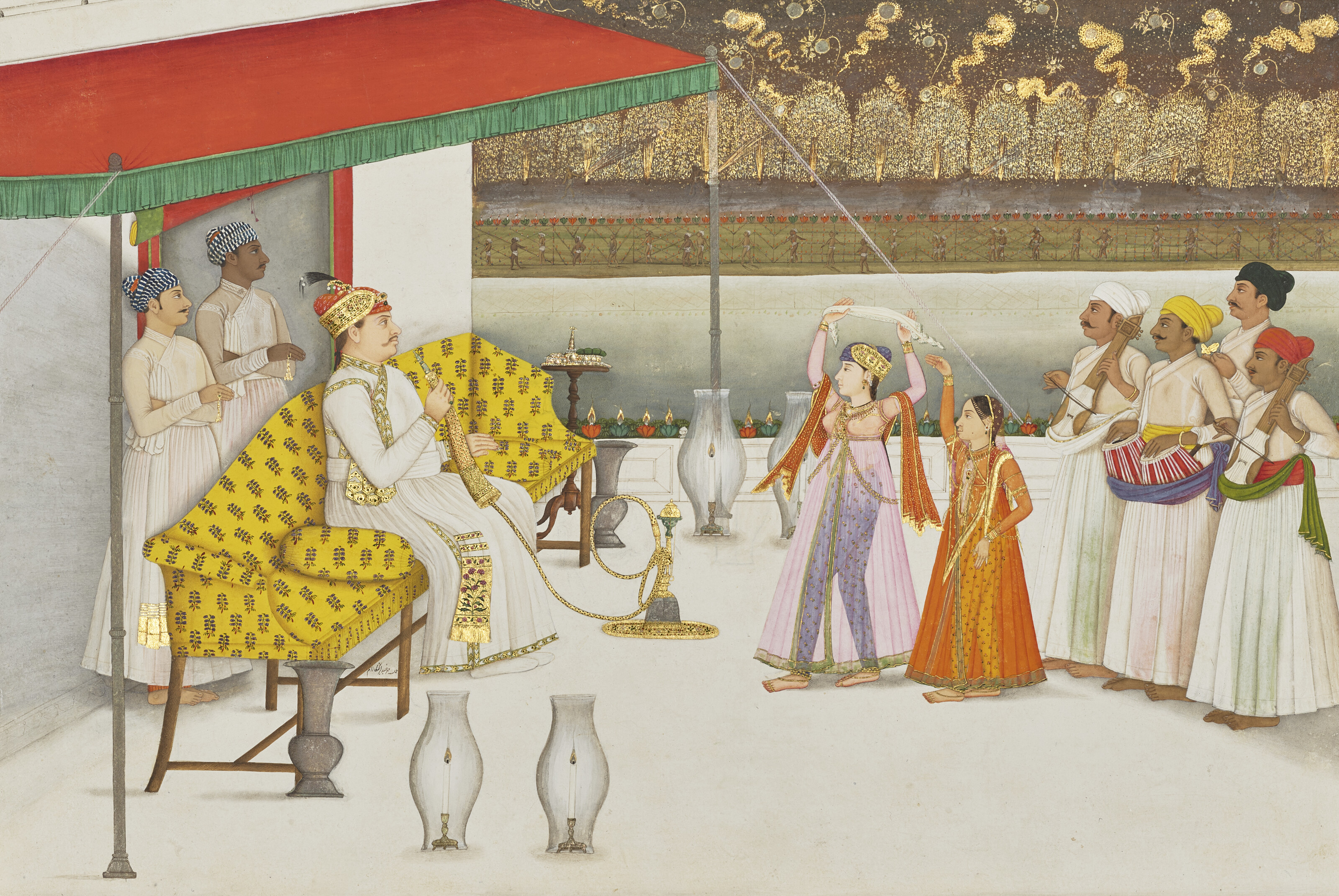
- Col. Polier's Nautch (Lucknow, c.1780), painted by Mihr Chand
- Born: 1741; Lausanne, Switzerland
- Died: 9 February 1795; France
- Occupation: Engineer
- Children: 3

Colonel Antoine-Louis Henri de Polier (1741 – 9 February 1795) was a Swiss army officer and art collector who served in the East India Company's Presidency armies during the eighteenth century. He was the father of Adolphe de Polier.

== Life ==
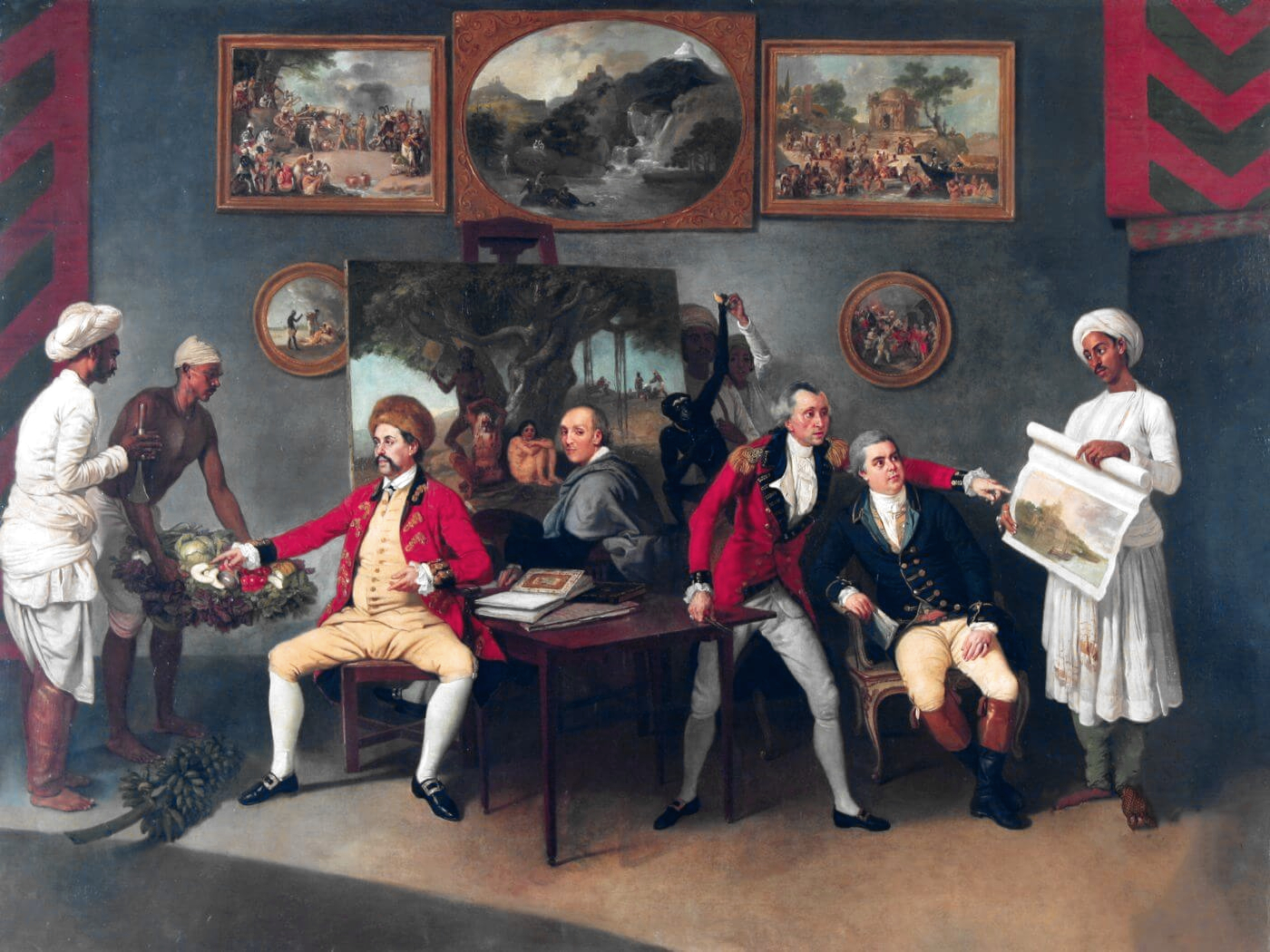
Polier, Claude Martin, John Wombwell and Johann Zoffany surrounded by servants and Polier's art collection.

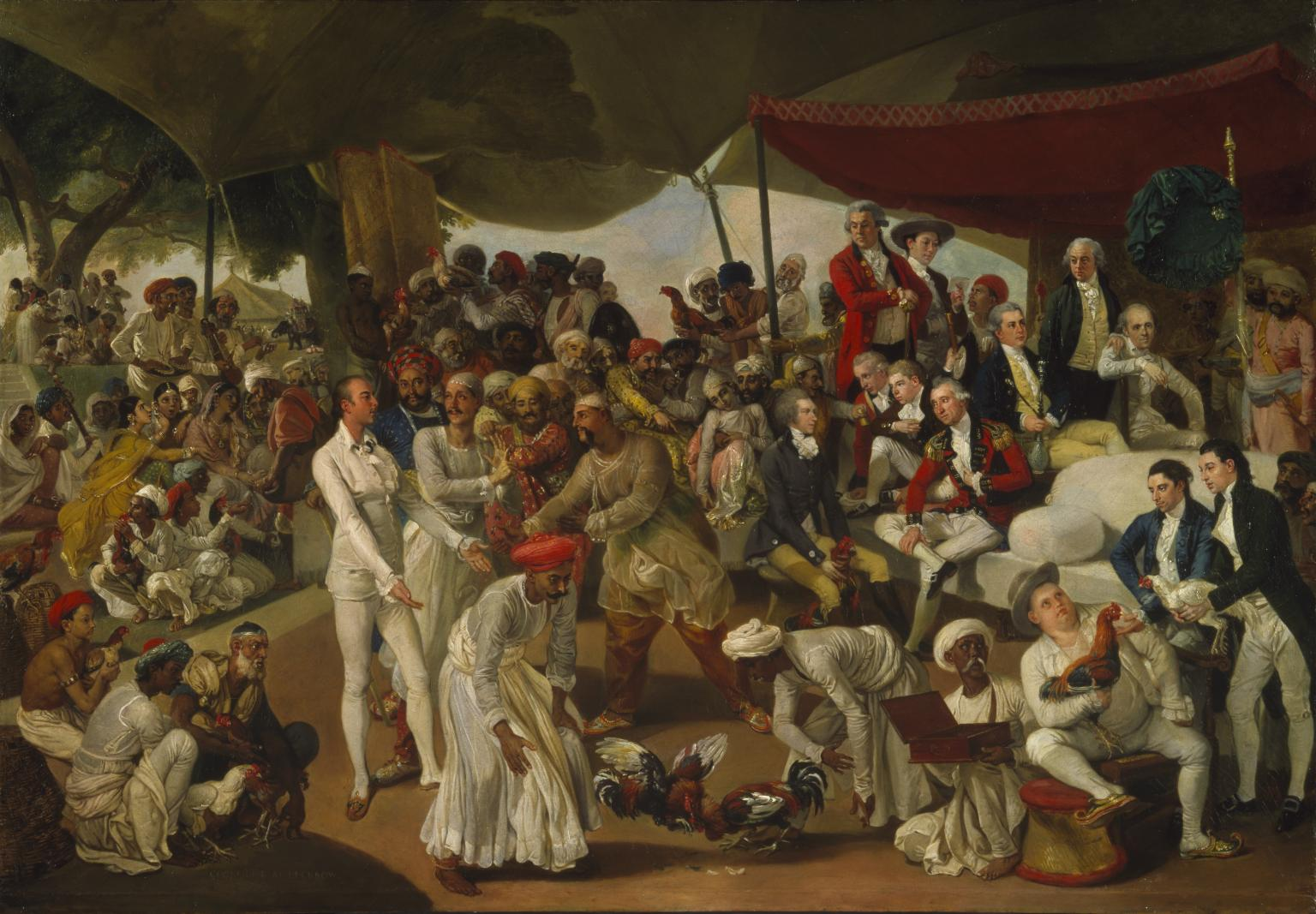
Colonel Mordaunt's Cock Match (Johan Zoffany, c. 1785)

Antoine-Louis was born in Lausanne from a French Huguenot family who emigrated to Switzerland in the mid 16th century to escape the wars of religion. He was the youngest son of Jacques-Henri de Polier and his wife Jeanne-Françoise Moreau. He later learned Hindi and Persian.

Antoine Polier was an engineer from Lausanne who supported the military adventures of Robert Clive and later became a rich trader and loyal supporter of the British administration in Calcutta. He devoted his free moments to collecting rare manuscripts in Sanskrit, Persian and Arabic. Many were sent back to France to augment the growing collection in the Royal Library. France was now the center for the study of ancient Indian languages and its 'orientalism' spread to Germany in the early 1800s as Europe began to show a keen interest in early Indian-Persian-Zoroastrian origins. He designed the Bibiyapur Kothi, a royal residence outside of Lucknow.

On learning Indian mythology, Polier notes:

When one begins such a study without the advantage of possessing the Samscrite[Sanskrit], or sacred, tongue of the Indous, which the Pundits or savants so constantly draw upon in their usual discourse that it is difficult for me to follow them in their conversation, even though I have a deep knowledge [je possédé à fond] of the common tongue of India, called Moors by the English, and Ourdouzebain by the natives of the land.

In India, he had two Indian wives, Jugnu and Zinat, one senior and one junior and three (or possibly, four) children who were all baptized in Calcutta. He acquired a large art collection and became rich working for the Indian royalty. In 1788 he left his Indian wives with his loyal companion and fellow enlightened adventurer, Claude Martin. and settled in France with an unfortunate timing as he arrived in time for the French revolution. Having purchased a chateau and taking a French wife and two children, Charles de Polier and Adolphe de Polier. He was assassinated in Avignon on February 9, 1795, in the terror that followed the French revolution.

== Legacy ==
Polier's Mythology of the Hindus was edited by his cousin, Marie-Elisabeth Polier, for posthumous publication. Polier, who felt he had lost the ability to express himself easily in French or English as a result of his travels, dictated an autobiographical preface to her. Sanjay Subrahmanyam has suggested that her lack of knowledge of Indian geography may have introduced inconsistencies into the text. He was one of the first English writers on the Sikhs, in 1776 and 1780. A further work of his on the Sikhs co-authored with George Forster was published in 1803.

Polier collected Indian miniatures and calligraphy and is considered as an "unparalleled figure" among collectors of muraqqas during the second half of the 18th-century. The more than 30 volumes of Indian paintings assembled for him are known as Polier albums and are today kept in museums around the globe.

== Bibliography ==
- Character of the Sieks. From the Observations of Colonel Polier and Mr. Forster (London: Asiatic Annual Review, 1803) by Antoine-Louis Henri Polier and George Forster

== See also ==
- Claude Martin
