= Muraqqa =

Album in book form containing Islamic miniature paintings and calligraphy

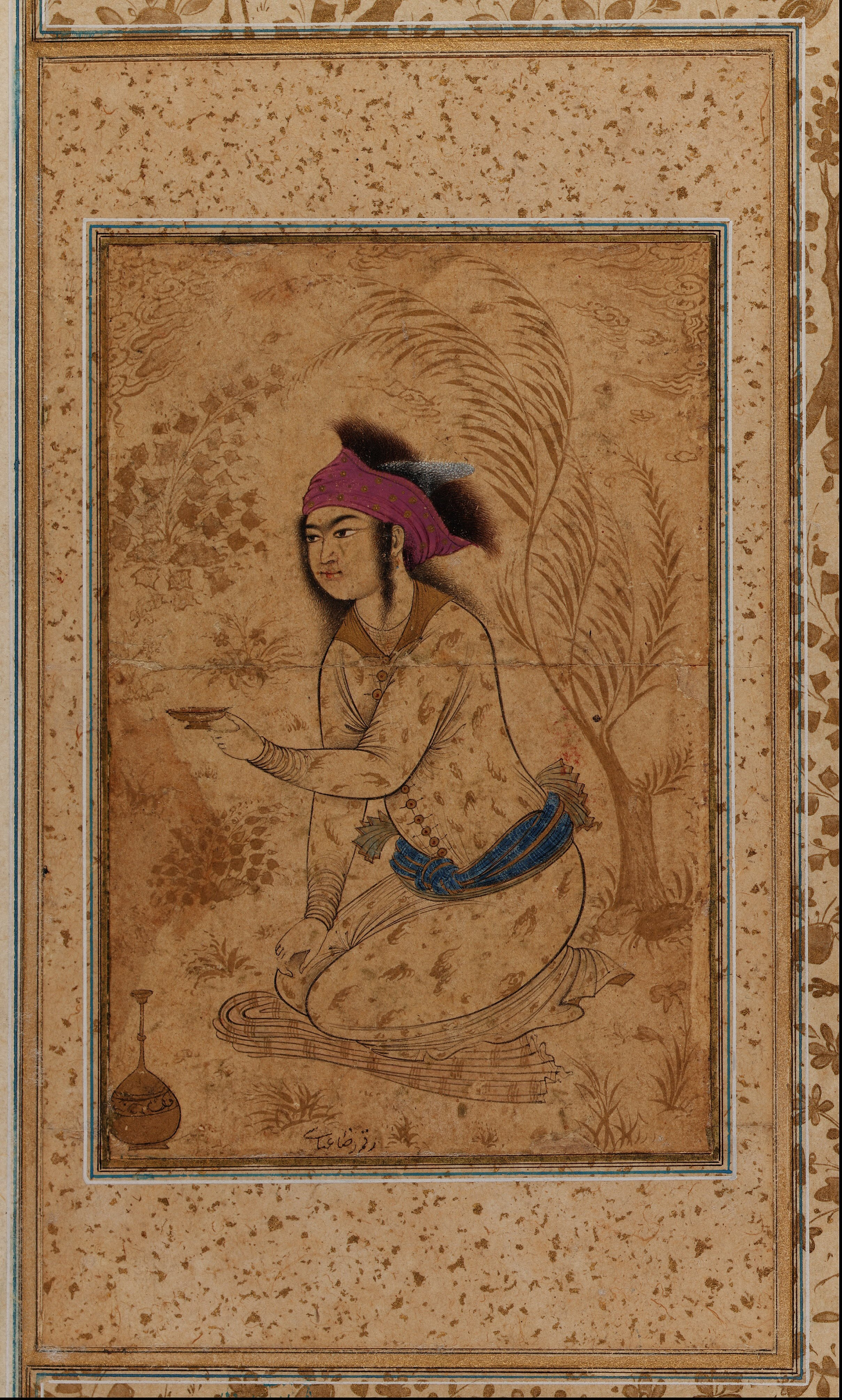
Youth kneeling and holding out a wine-cup. Safavid period, early 17th century. Isfahan School. Ink and color wash on paper. Freer Sackler Gallery F1928.10.

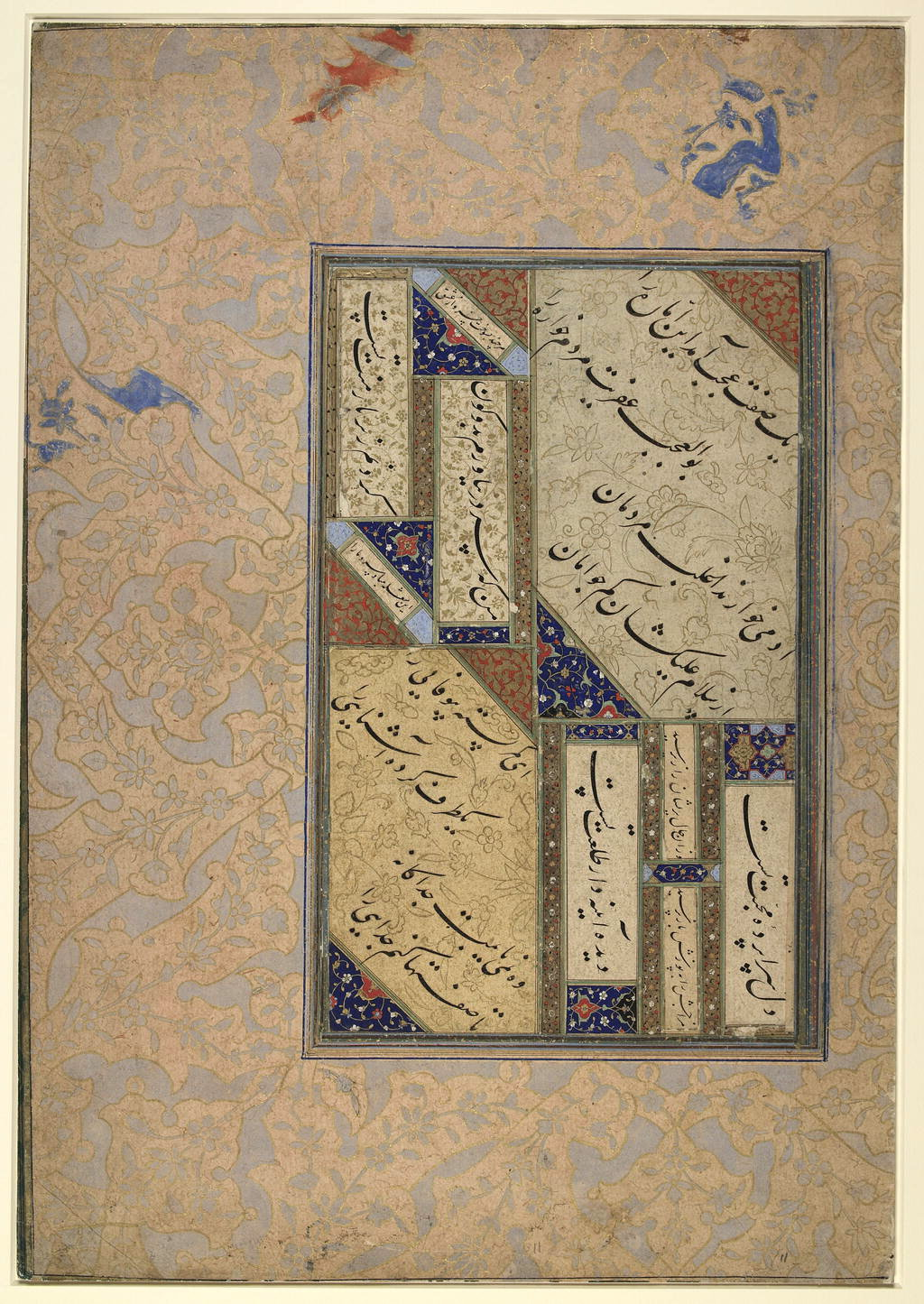
Some verses in Persian written in the Nasta'liq script, probably always a single page meant for a muraqqa; 16–17th century.

A Muraqqa (Persian: مُرَقّع, Arabic: مُرَقّع, Turkish: Murakka), meaning "patched" in Arabic, is an album in codex or concertina format, which can contain specimens of Islamic calligraphy and also paintings, often assembled from different sources and periods, and perhaps other matter. The album was popular among collectors in the Islamic world, and by the later 16th century became the predominant format for miniature painting in the Persian Safavid, Mughal Empire, and Ottoman Empire, greatly affecting the direction taken by the painting traditions of the Persian miniature, Ottoman miniature and Mughal miniature. The album largely replaced the full-scale illustrated manuscript of classics of Persian poetry, which had been the typical vehicle for the finest miniature painters up to that time. The great cost and delay of commissioning a top-quality example of such a work essentially restricted them to the ruler and a handful of other great figures, who usually had to maintain a whole workshop of calligraphers, artists and other craftsmen, with a librarian to manage the whole process.

An album could be compiled over time, page by page, and often included miniatures and pages of calligraphy from older books that were broken up for this purpose, and allowed a wider circle of collectors access to the best painters and calligraphers, although they were also compiled by, or presented to, shahs and emperors. The earliest muraqqa were of pages of calligraphy only; it was at the court in Herat of the Timurid prince Baysunghur in the early 15th century that the form became important for miniature painting. The word muraqqa means "that which has been patched together" in Persian.

The works in an album, typically of different original sizes, were trimmed or mounted on standard size pages, often with new border decoration being added. When the compilation was considered complete it was bound, often very luxuriously, with an Islamic book-cover that might be highly decorated with lacquered paint, gold stamping on leather, or other techniques. Other muraqqa might be bound in a special concertina-like form. Many were arranged with pages of calligraphy facing miniatures, the matching of verse to image allowing some scope for the creativity of the compiler. Albums containing only calligraphy tended to be arranged chronologically to show the development of a style. The bindings of many albums allowed items to be added and removed, or they were just removed from the centre of the page, and such changes were often made; some albums had marks which allow changes to be traced. The grandest albums had specially written prefaces which are the source of a high proportion of surviving contemporary writing on the arts of the book, and the biographies of painters and calligraphers; these tended to be written by calligraphers. For calligraphers too the single page for an album became the "bread and butter" source of income, using mostly texts from poetry, whether extracts from a long classic or ghazal lyrics, but sometimes an extract from the Qur'an, perhaps given the place of honour at the start of the album. Album pages often have areas of decorated illumination (as in the illustration) that share their motifs with other media, notably book-covers and carpet designs, the best of which were in fact probably mostly produced by the same type of artist at court, and sent to the weavers.

While the classic Islamic illuminated manuscript tradition had concentrated on rather crowded scenes with strong narrative content as illustrations in full texts of classic and lengthy works like the Shahnameh and the Khamsa of Nizami, the single miniature intended from the start for a muraqqa soon developed as a simpler scene with fewer, larger, figures, often showing idealized beauties of either sex in a garden setting, or genre figures from nomadic life, usually with no real or fictional identities attached to them. In Mughal India realistic portraiture, nearly always of rulers or courtiers, became a very common feature, and in Ottoman Turkey portraits of the Sultans, often very stylised, were a particular speciality. Fully coloured scenes tended to give way to part-drawn and part-painted ones, or to figures with little or no background. The album to some extent overlaps with the anthology, a collection of different pieces where the main emphasis is on the texts, but which can also include paintings and drawings inserted from different sources.

== Shift to the album ==
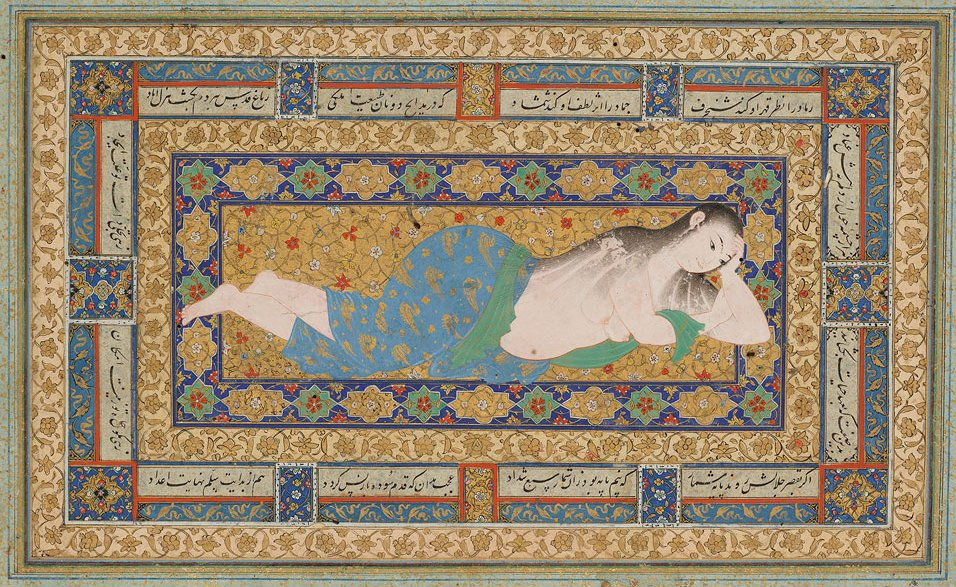
A Young Lady Reclining After a Bath, Herat 1590s, a single miniature for the muraqqa market

=== Iran ===
The dominant tradition of miniature painting in the late Middle Ages was that of Persia, which had a number of centres, but all usually dependent on one key patron, whether the shah himself, or a figure either governing a part of the country from a centre such as Herat, where Baysunghur was an important patron in the early 15th century, or the ruler of a further part of the Persianate world in a centre like Bukhara. As the Safavid dynasty centralized Persian rule in the 16th century the number of potential patrons of a full-size atelier declined, but the atelier of the shah expanded and produced a number of superb illustrated books, using a variety of very talented artists on each. However, in the 1540s Shah Tahmasp I, previously a keen patron, lost interest in commissioning books, and thereafter the Persian miniature painting tradition lacked a steady source of commissions for books in the old style. After a gap of some years, Tahmasp's nephew Ibrahim Mirza established an atelier at Mashad, which produced the Freer Jami in the 1560s, and which Shah Ismail II took over after having its former patron killed in 1577. But Ismail's reign was very brief, and thereafter consistent large-scale patronage was lacking. It was in this period that the single miniature designed for inserting in an album came to be dominant; such works had long been produced, but now they became the main source of income for many artists, who probably often produced them speculatively with no commission, and then looked to sell them (little is known about the market for album miniatures).

The artist who epitomises the Persian album miniature is Riza Abbasi, active from the 1580s until his death in 1635, whose early single miniatures of groups are somewhat like those in narrative scenes, but lacking any actual narrative attached to them. He soon turned to, and developed, subjects mostly of one or two figures, often portrait-like, although very few identities are given or were probably ever intended to be recognised. There are a large number of beautiful youths, to whose clothes great attention is paid.

=== Ottoman Empire ===
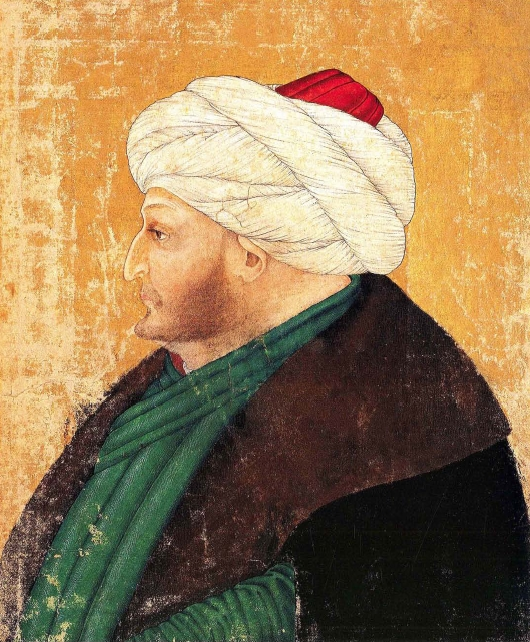
15th century portrait of Mehmet II (1432-1481), showing Italian influence

The best Ottoman painting was heavily concentrated in the capital, which from 1453 was Istanbul, and the most important patron was always the Sultan. The royal library remains very largely intact in Turkey, mostly at Topkapi Palace, and was greatly enriched by Persian manuscripts, initially taken during the several Ottoman invasions of eastern Persia, and later, after a treaty in 1555, often received as diplomatic gifts. Many of these manuscripts were broken up to use the miniatures in albums. Persian artists were imported from virtually the start of the Ottoman tradition, but especially in the 16th century; sixteen artists were brought back just from the brief Ottoman conquest of Tabriz in 1514, though by 1558 the palace records list only nine foreign artists of all kinds, against twenty-six Turks. But a distinctively Ottoman style can be seen from the start of the 16th century, with pictures showing simpler landscape backgrounds, more sea and ships, neatly tented army camps, distant cityscapes, more individual characterization of faces, but also a less refined technique. There was strong European influence, mostly from Venice, but this was restricted to portraiture.

Turkish albums include mixtures of collected miniatures similar to those in Persia, and often including Persian pieces, with the addition of rather more greatly elaborated pen drawings of an essentially decorative nature, of a foliage motif, or a bird or animal treated largely as such. Albums dedicated to the sultans, with portraits and laudatory pieces of text, are a distinctive Turkish type, and there were also albums of scenes of Turkish life, showing the relatively uniform costume of different ranks in society, methods of torture and execution, and other scenes of interest to the mostly Western foreigners they were produced for, matching similar prints made in contemporary Europe.

One very distinctive type of miniature is found only in Ottoman albums, though they may have been brought from Persia as booty, and perhaps were not intended for albums originally. These are eighty or so the mysterious and powerful images grouped under the name of Siyah Qalam, meaning "Black Pen" (or drunk or evil pen), full of demons and scenes which suggest nomadic life in Central Asia, though it has also been suggested that they come from a single Persian court artist letting himself go. They are perhaps from the early 15th century, reaching Turkey in the 16th.

Another distinctive type of Ottoman work is the découpage or cut paper miniature, where different colours of paper, cut with minute detail then pasted together, are used to create the image. This technique was used for book-covers in Timurid Persia, which were then varnished over for protection, but in Turkey the images were treated as miniatures and went inside albums; the technique was also much used for page border decoration.

=== Mughal Empire & Indian Subcontinent ===
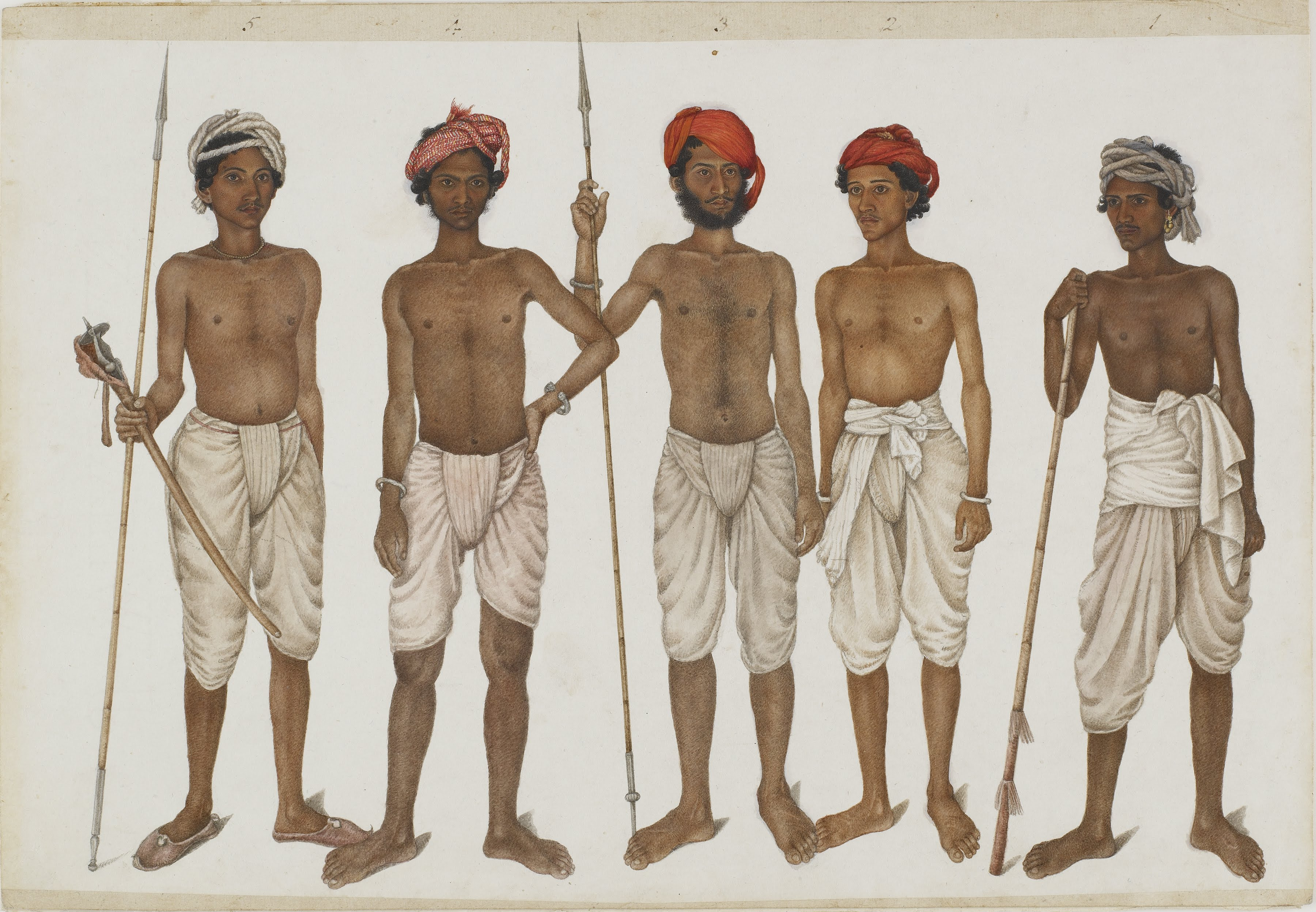
Company style miniature of Five Recruits to a British Indian military unit, c. 1815

The Mughal dynasty in the Indian subcontinent was rather later in establishing a large court atelier, which did not begin until after the exile in Persia of the second emperor, Humayun, who on his return was joined from about 1549 by Persian artists including Abd as-Samad. The Mughal style developed under the next emperor, Akbar, who commissioned some very large illustrated books, but his artists produced single miniatures for albums as well. In the case of the Jahangirnama, the emperor Jahangir kept a diary and commissioned paintings separately, which were most likely held in the Kitabkhana, until his official contribution to the court chronicle genre could be assembled. From fairly early the Mughal style made a strong feature of realistic portraiture, usually in profile, and perhaps influenced by Western prints, which were available at the Mughal court. For a long time portraits were always of men, often accompanied by generalized female servants or concubines; but there is scholarly debate about the representation of female court members in portraiture. Some scholars claim there are no known extant likenesses of figures like Jahanara Begum and Mumtaz Mahal, and others attribute miniatures, for example from the Dara Shikoh album or the Freer Gallery of Art mirror portrait, to these famous noblewomen. Another popular subject area was realistic studies of animals and plants, mostly flowers; from the 17th century equestrian portraits, mostly of rulers, became another popular borrowing from the West. The single idealized figure of the Riza Abbasi type was less popular, but fully painted scenes of lovers in a palace setting became popular later. Drawings of genre scenes, especially showing holy men, whether Muslim or Hindu, were also popular.

Akbar had an album, now dispersed, consisting entirely of portraits of figures at his enormous court which had a practical purpose; according to chroniclers he used to consult it when discussing appointments and the like with his advisors, apparently to jog his memory of who the people being discussed were. Many of them, like medieval European images of saints, carried objects associated with them to help identification, but otherwise the figures stand on a plain background. There are a number of fine portraits of Akbar, but it was under his successors Jahangir and Shah Jahan that the portrait of the ruler became firmly established as a leading subject in Indian miniature painting, which was to spread to both Muslim and Hindu princely courts across India.

In the 18th and 19th centuries Indian artists working in the hybrid Indo-European Company style produced albums of miniatures for Europeans living in India as part of the British Raj and its French and Portuguese equivalents. Some Europeans collected or were given earlier Indian miniatures; the Large and Small Clive albums were presented to Lord Clive, and are now in the Victoria & Albert Museum in London. Others created albums of new work, tending to concentrate on animal portraits and the houses, horses and other possessions of this wealthy group. Antoine Polier is considered as an "unparalleled figure" among collectors of muraqqas during the second half of the 18th century. The albums assembled for him of or his behalf are known as the Polier albums. In the 19th century images of Indians and their costumes, often categorized by regional and ethnic type, or occupation, became very popular. Large-scale patrons included Colonel James Skinner of Skinner's Horse fame, who had a Rajput mother, and for natural history paintings, Mary Impey, wife of Elijah Impey, who commissioned over three hundred, and the Marquess Wellesley, brother of the first Duke of Wellington, who had over 2,500 miniatures.

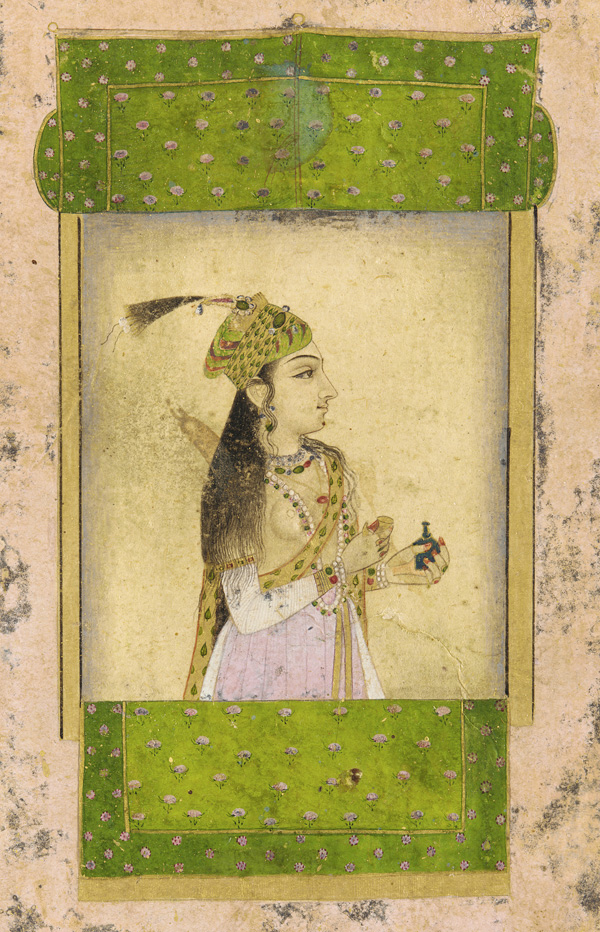
A noble lady, Mughal dynasty, India. 17th century. Color and gold on paper. Freer Gallery of Art F1907.219.

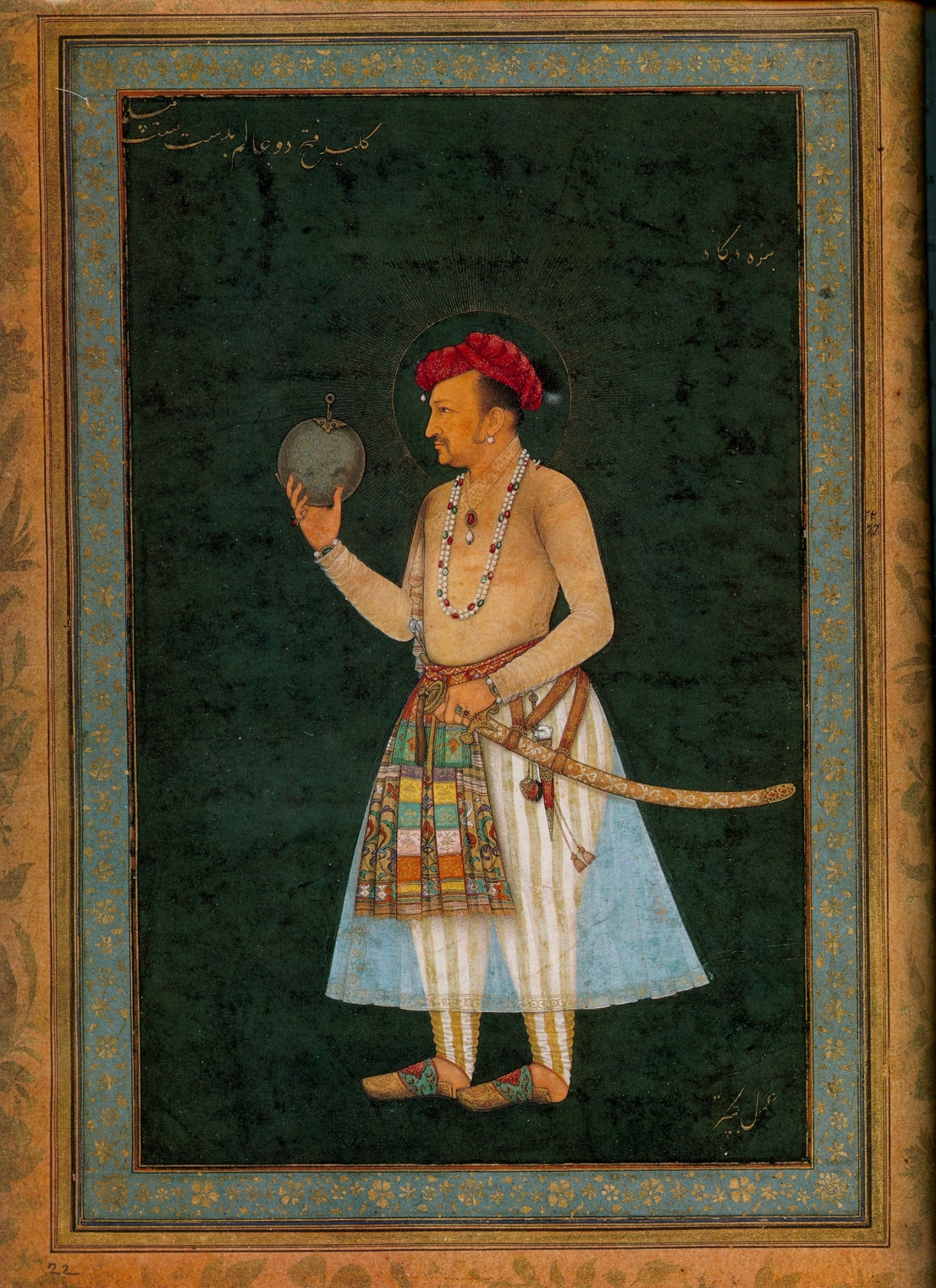
Jahangir holding a globe, 1614-1618. India.

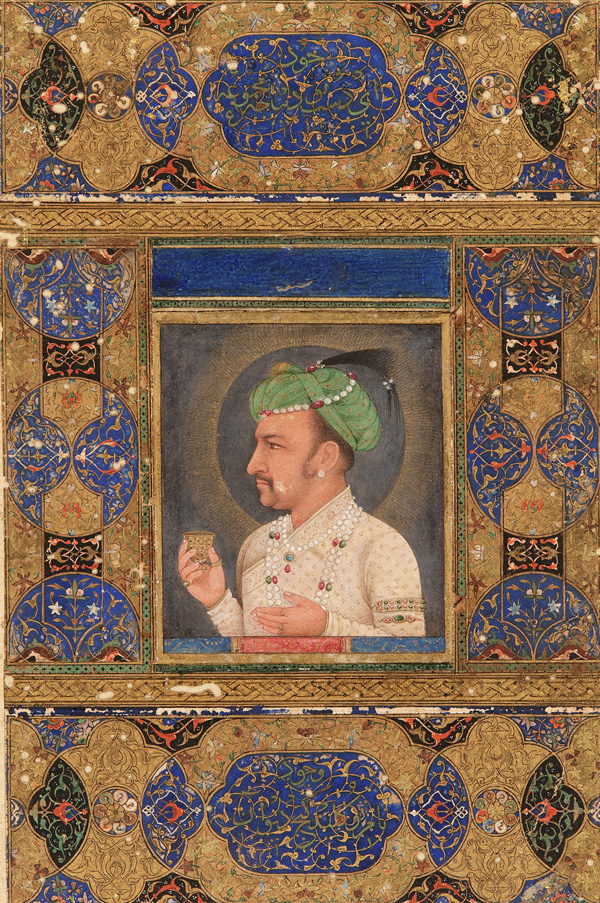
Jahangir, Mughal dynasty, Reign of Jahangir, 17th century. India. Color and gold on paper.Freer Gallery of Art. F1907.187.

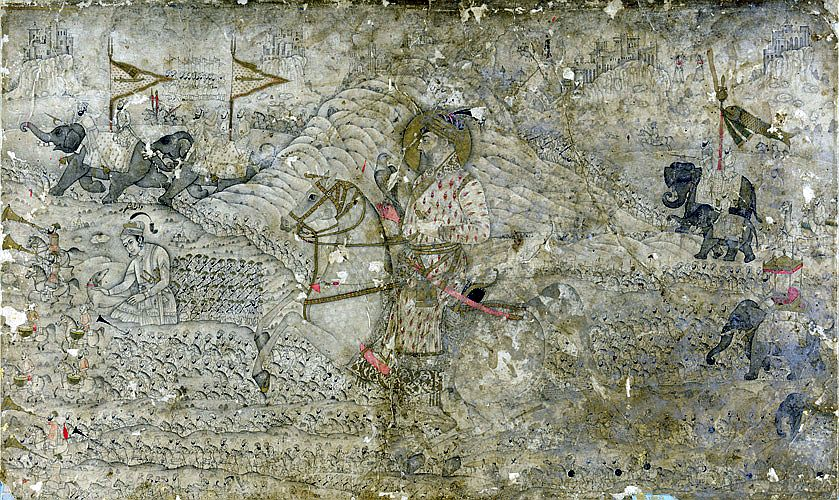
Shah Jahan and his son, Dara Shikoh hunting, Mughal, India. c 17th century. Color and gold on paper. Freer Sackler Gallery F1907.196

== Use of albums ==
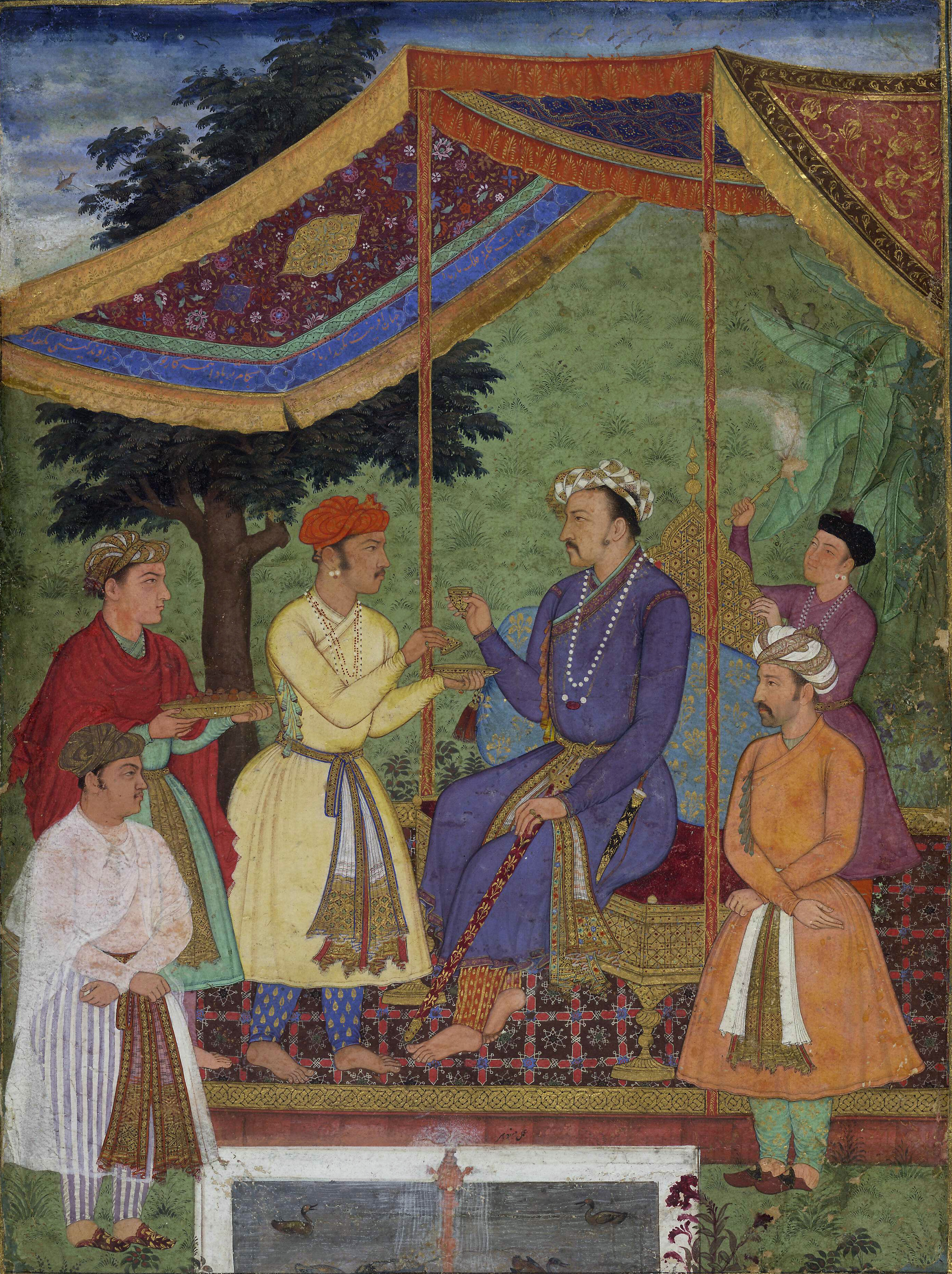
Manohar, Emperor Jahangir receiving his two sons, an album-painting in gouache on paper, c. 1605-6

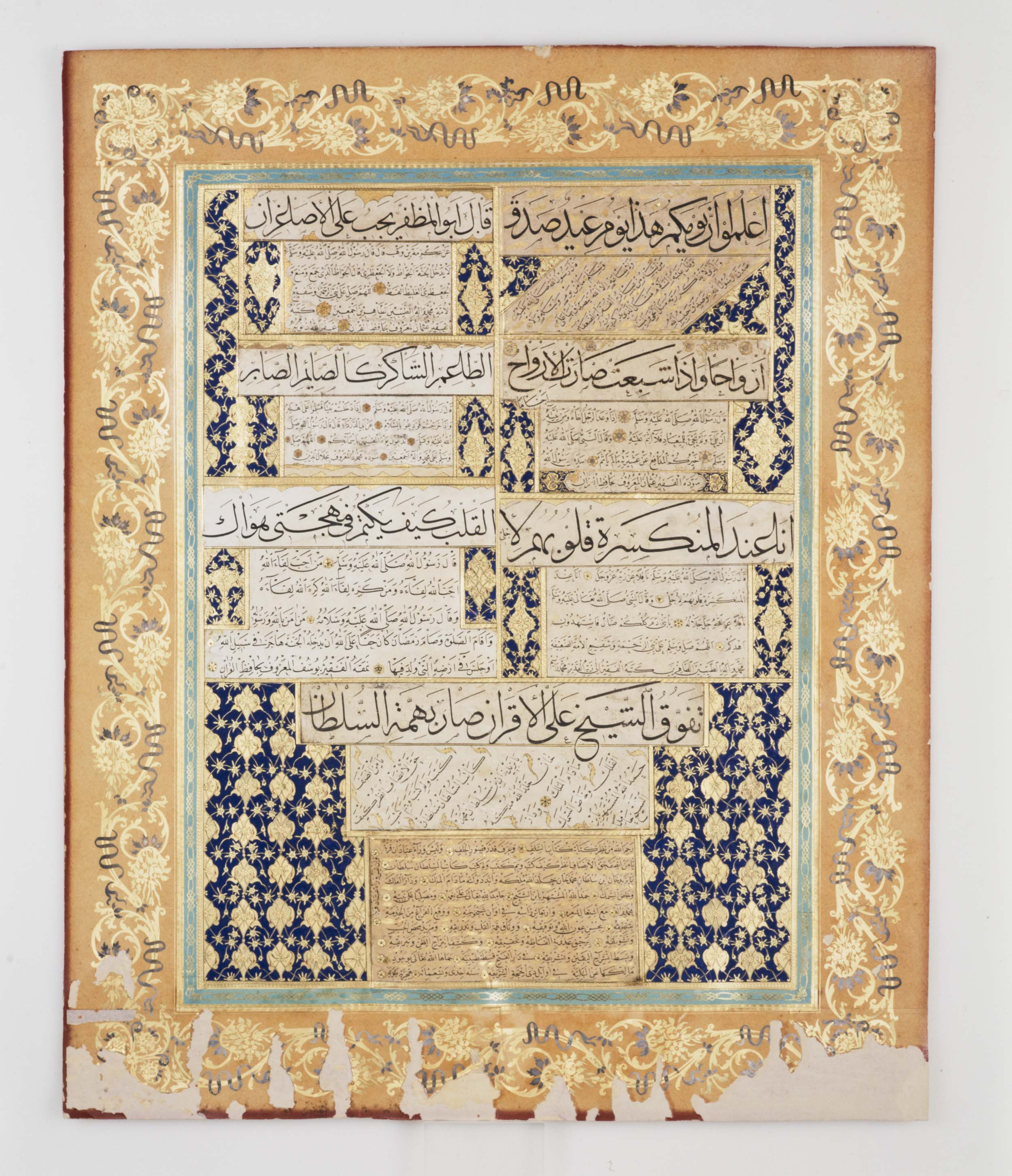
Eight separate pieces of calligraphy by five different Ottoman calligraphers (Sheikh Hamdullah, Hâfiz Osman, Yusuf Efendi (d. 1729), Mehmed Rasim and Mahmud Celaleddin Efendi) which were trimmed and pasted onto separate sheets of paper and mounted on a single sheet of muraqqa page

Albums were often presented as gifts to mark a milestone in life. Chroniclers record that when the Persian Prince Ibrahim Mirza was killed in 1577, on the orders of Shah Tahmasp I, his wife, Tahmasp's sister, destroyed artworks including an album containing miniatures by Behzad among others, which her husband had compiled and given her for their wedding, washing the miniatures in water. Perhaps she did not want anything to fall into the hands of her brother, who had ordered his death, and who did take over the prince's atelier. Albums were often presented to rulers on their accession, or in Turkey at New Year. They could also be given as diplomatic gifts between rulers.

A muraqqa was created for Sultan Murad III in 1572 when he ascended to the throne, which is unusual because the dedication is very detailed, including the date and place of creation, namely Istanbul, 980 AH/1572-73 AD. The dedication is to Murad III, also naming his compiler Mehmed Cenderecizade. The Murad III muraqqa was designed much more extravagantly than other Islamic muraqqa and with original nakkashane (Ottoman painting studio) border paintings. This muraqqa contained miniature paintings, ink drawings, and calligraphy, including ghazals. The Murad III muraqqa has twenty-four miniatures created in the cities of Bukhara to the east of Persia, Tabriz, Isfahan, and Qazvin in Persia, and Istanbul between the late fifteenth and seventeenth centuries. It has a two-page introduction written in Persian, which is similar in structure to Timurid and Safavid album prefaces, and indicates that this muraqqa was compiled in Istanbul less than two years before Murad III became Sultan.

Another album in the Ottoman royal collection contains only Western images, mostly prints but including a drawing in pen of an Ornamental Scroll with Putti and Penises, "for the merriment of adult guests at a dinner in Pera". The collection was probably assembled for a Florentine in the late 15th century, probably a merchant living in Istanbul (where Pera was the quarter for Westerners). The other 15 images are a mixed group of Florentine engravings, mostly unique impressions (i.e. otherwise unknown), with some religious subjects and a coloured print of Mehmet II, who apparently acquired the album. It is of interest to art historians because only a small handful of early albums of Western prints survive anywhere, having been broken up by later collectors or dealers; they were probably common among collectors in Europe at the time.

=== Examples from the Mughal Court ===
- Salim Album, produced in the reign of Akbar the Great, contains both Christian images and portraits of Hindu courtiers.
- Minto Albums, from the reign of Shah Jahan, contains miniatures depicting royal courtiers, gardens, and images of wildlife, surrounded by elaborate floral borders.
- Shah Jahan Album, now dispersed, as it was split up by George Joseph Demotte, a Belgian dealer. Many of the sheets are now in the Metropolitan Museum of Art in New York.
- Kevorkian Album, now mostly split between New York (Metropolitan) and Washington (Freer).
- Gulshan Album, compiled by Emperor Jahangir, now mostly in the Golestan Palace, Tehran.

== In modern times ==
Abdur Rahman Chughtai was a painter who was responsible for the revival of the muraqqa in the Indian subcontinent in 1928 after publishing his Muraqqa-I Chughtai. When he started painting in the 1910s his major influence was Hindu mythology, but by the 1920s he was inspired by Islamic artwork including the muraqqa, ghazals, and Ottoman miniatures.

Using the emergent tools of digital humanities, Sumathi Ramaswamy at Duke University has recreated the form of a Mughal muraqqa’ to track the itineraries of the terrestrial globe in early modern India.
