= Marie-Elisabeth Polier =

Swiss journalist and translator

Marie-Elisabeth Polier (1742-1817), known as the Chanoinesse of Heiliggrabben, was a Swiss journalist and translator.

== Life ==
Marie-Elisabeth Polier was born in 1742 in Lausanne. She was the daughter of Georges Polier, a colonel in the service of Hanover, and bilingual in French and German. Her sister Jeanne-Louise-Antoinette (or Eléonore) Polier also pursued literary activity, as did two other cousins: Isabelle de Montolieu and Isabelle's sister Nanette.

Polier took up a religious vocation, as Chanoinesse (canoness) of the Reformed Order of the Order of the Holy Sepulchre in Prussia.

In the 1790s Polier edited the literary periodical Journal littéraire de Lausanne. (Sources vary as to the precise timespan of this editorship: either 1794 to 1798, or 1793 to 1800.)

Polier collaborated with Joseph de Maimieux to edit various periodicals: the Bibliothèque germanique (1800–0), the Midi industrieux, and the Gazette brittanique. She later collaborated with her cousin, the Sanskrit manuscript hunter Colonel Antoine de Polier, editing his Mythology of the Hindus for publication after his death. Colonel Polier, who felt he had lost the ability to express himself easily in French or English as a result of his travels, dictated an autobiographical preface to her. Sanjay Subrahmanyam has suggested that her lack of knowledge of Indian geography may have introduced inconsistencies into the text.

Polier was named Dame of Honour at the court of Saxe-Meiningen, and died in Roudolstadt in 1817.

== Works ==
- (tr.) Antonie: suivie de plusieurs pieces intéressantes by Christian Leberecht Heyne. Translated from the German. Mourer, Paris, Lausanne: Buisson, 1787.
- (tr.) Recueil d'historiettes. Translated from the German. Lausanne, Paris: L. Luquiens and Bossange & Comp., 1792.
- (tr.) Le club des jacobines, ou L'amour de la patrie: comédie en un acte by August von Kotzebue. Translated freely from the German. Paris, 1792.
- ? (tr.) La Sylphide ou l'ange gardien. Translated from the English The Sylph, by Georgiana Cavendish, Duchess of Devonshire. Lausanne, Paris, 1795. This translation has also been attributed to Isabelle de Montolieu.
- (tr.) Eugénie, ou la résignation: anecdote by Sophie von La Roche. Translated from the German Schönes Bild der Resignation, eine Erzählung. Lausanne: Em. Henri Vincent, 1795.
- (tr,) Le pauvre aveugle by Christian Leberecht Heyne. Translated from the German. Paris: Chomel, 1805.
- (ed.) Mythologie des Indous by Antoine Polier. Roudolstadt, Paris, 1809.
