= Adolphe de Polier =

French officer in the service of the Russian Empire

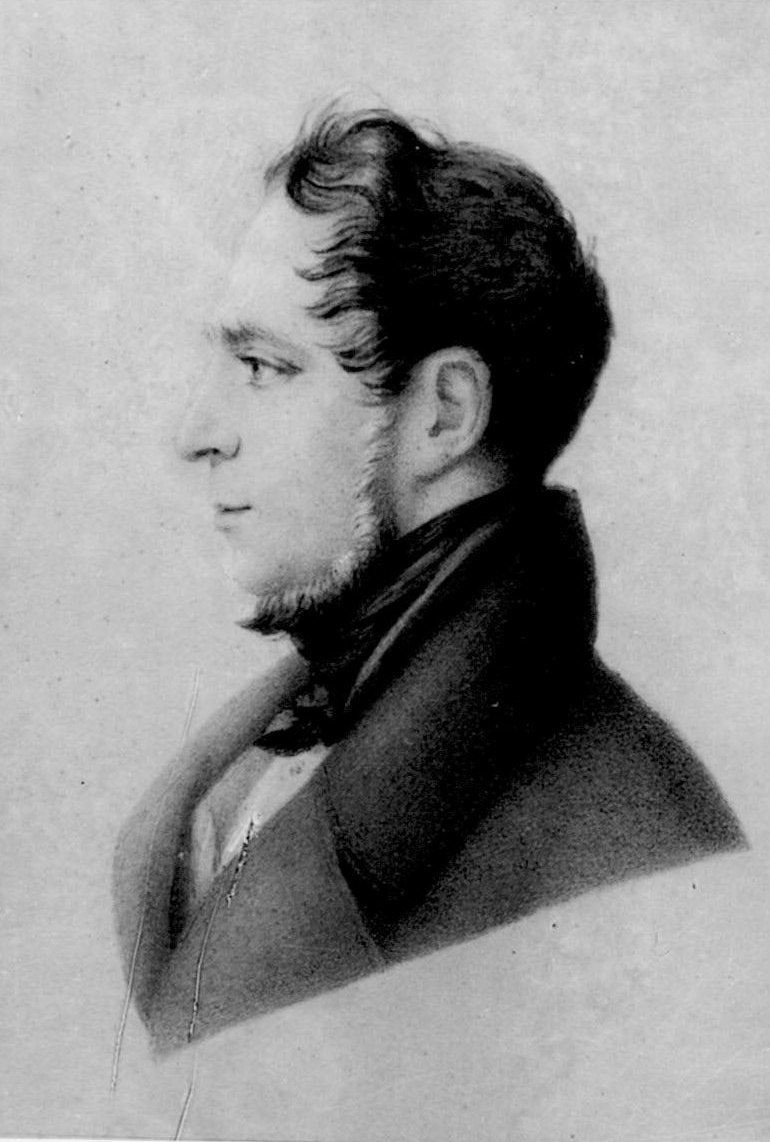
- A portrait by Thomas Wright
- Born: 18 June 1795; Avignon, France
- Died: 1830 (aged 34–35)
- Known for: discovering first Russian diamond
- Spouse: Varvara Shakhovskaya
- Parent: Antoine Polier

Count Adolphe de Polier (1795–1830) was a French officer in the service of the Russian Empire. He is remembered as the man who found Russia's first diamonds.

== Life ==
Polier was born in Avignon in 1795. He was the posthumous son of Antoine Polier, an engineer who had made a fortune in India and then returned in time to be called an aristocrat during the French Revolution. His father was killed, leaving a pregnant widow and a son.

In 1812 Polier joined the French cavalry. He then worked for the French General Staff.

Adolphe married Princess Varvara Shakhovskaya (1796–1870), one of Russia's richest women, in 1826. The following year he entered the Russian service as Chamberlain of Emperor Nicholas I. He also served as vice-minister of Finance. As a member of the Saint Petersburg Academy of Sciences he organised several scientific expeditions. In 1829, he accompanied Alexander von Humboldt to the Ural region to some land that was owned by his wife. Whilst Humboldt found gold and platinum but he was convinced that there should be diamonds but the closest he found was Zircons. Polier went off on his own and after four days a local 14 year old peasant boy showed him a diamond he had discovered. Humboldt complimented Polier on his mineralogy. Soon they had three diamonds and Polier presented Humboldt with a present of one weighing half a carat.

Count Polier died at the age of 35 and was buried at his wife's estate of Pargolovo near Saint Petersburg in a vault commissioned from Alexander Brullov.
