= Faizabad =

- City
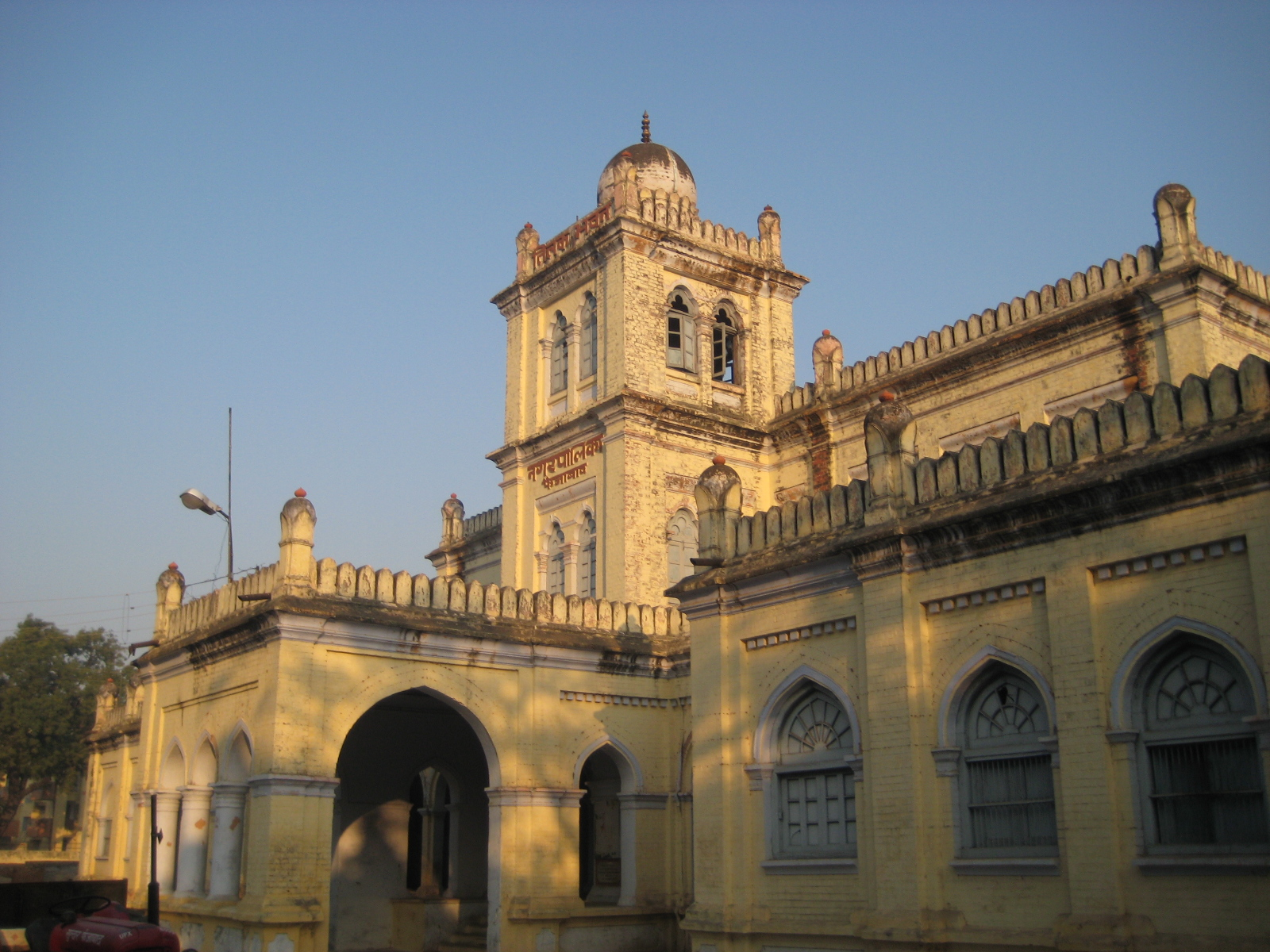
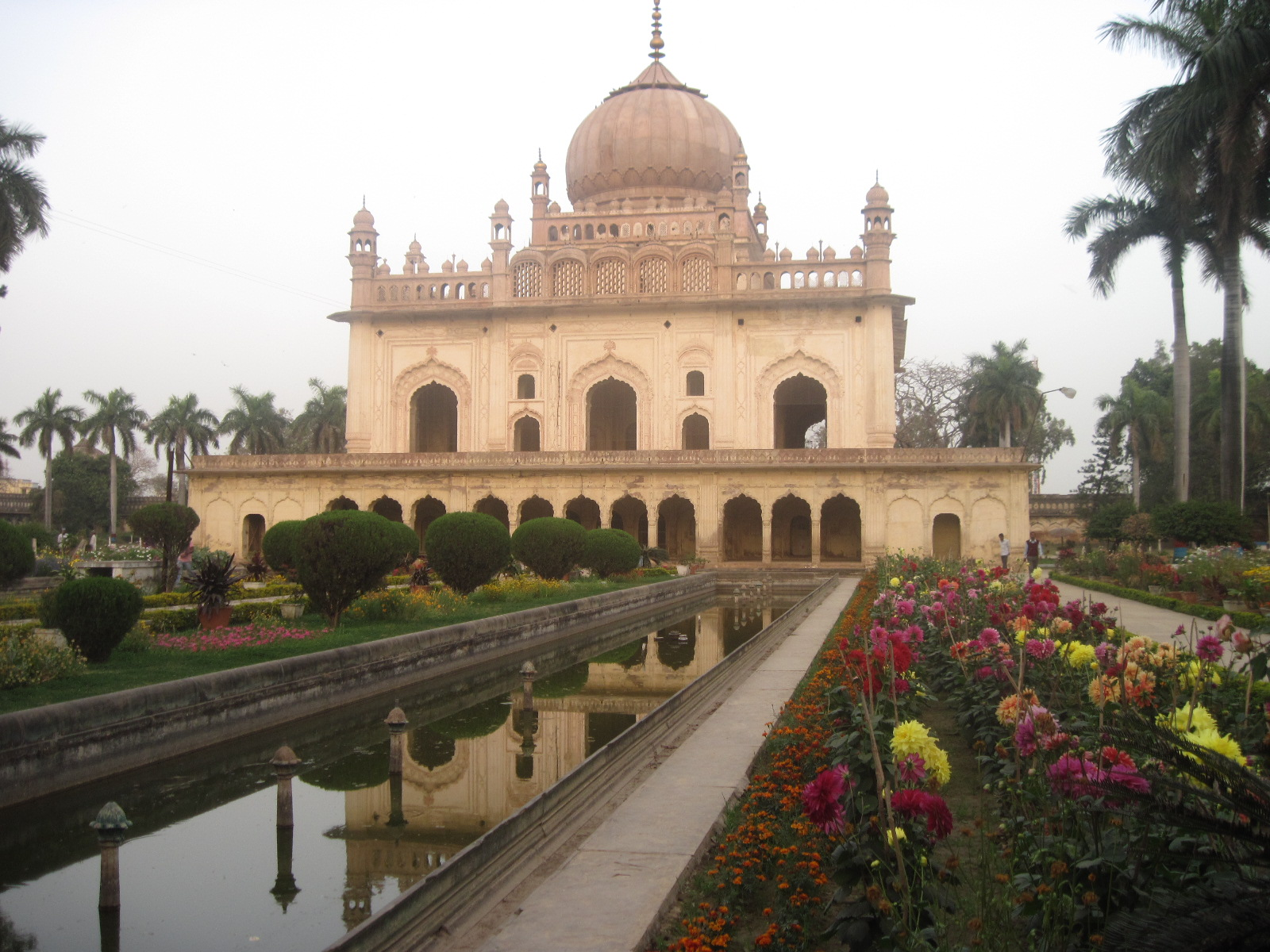
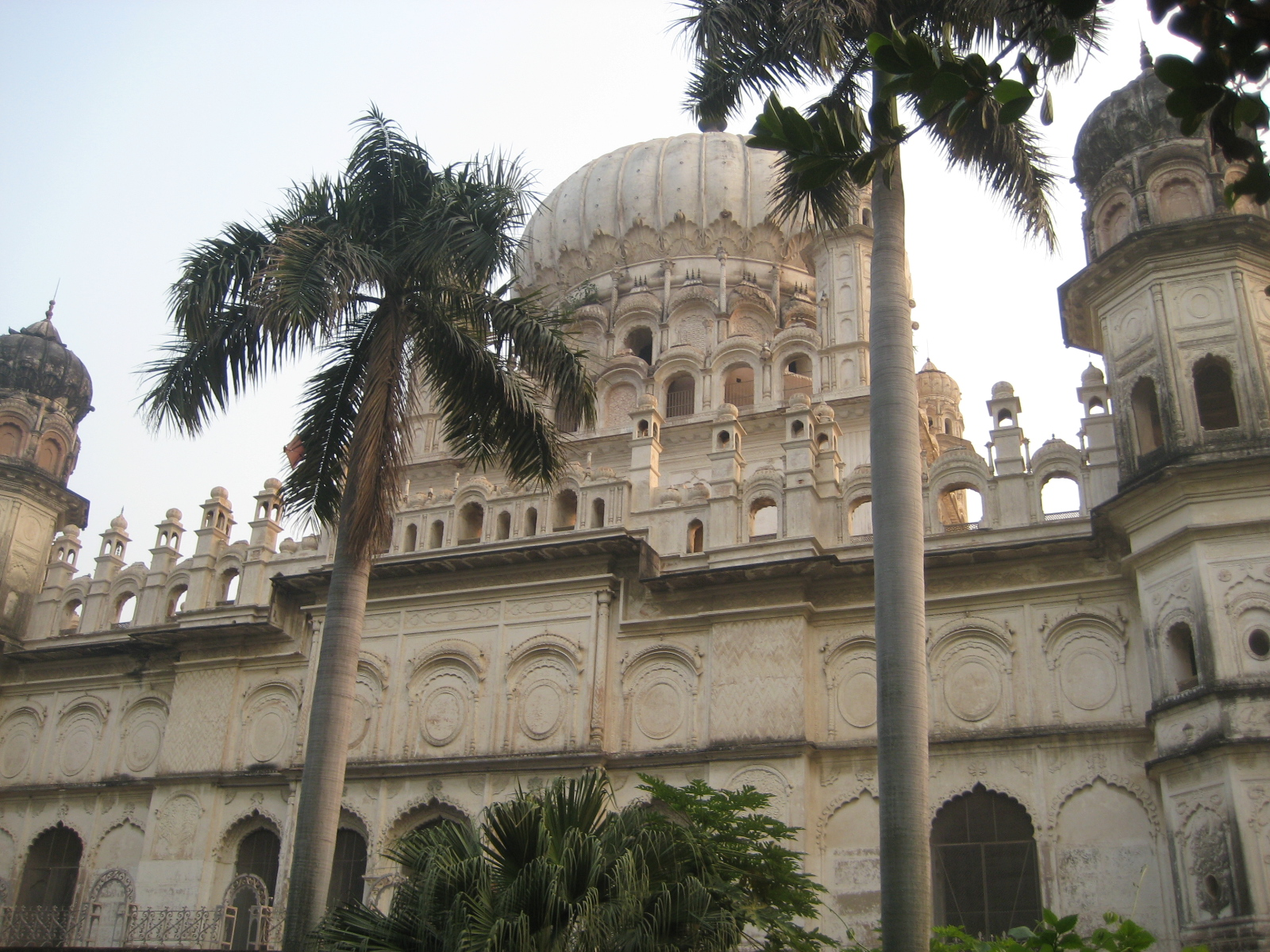
- Tilak Hall, Gulab Bari, Bahu Begum ka Maqbara

- Location in Uttar Pradesh, India Faizabad (India)
- Coordinates: 26°46′20″N 82°08′45″E
- Country: India
- State: Uttar Pradesh
- Division: Ayodhya
- District: Ayodhya

Government
  - Type: Municipal corporation
  - Body: Ayodhya Municipal Corporation
  - Mayor: Girish Pati Tripathi, (BJP)

Area
  - Total: 16.02 km^{2} (6.19 sq mi)
- Elevation: 97 m (318 ft)

Population (2011)
  - Total: 165,228
  - Density: 10,310/km^{2} (26,710/sq mi)

Language
  - Official: Hindi
  - Additional official: Urdu
  - Regional: Awadhi
- Time zone: UTC+5:30 (IST)
- PIN: 224001
- Telephone code: +91-5278
- Vehicle registration: UP-42
- Sex ratio: 998/1000 ♂/♀
- Website: ayodhya.nic.in

Faizabad (Hindustani pronunciation: [fɛːzaːbaːd]) is a city located in Ayodhya district in the Indian state of Uttar Pradesh. It is situated on the southern bank of the River Saryu about 6.5 km from Ayodhya City, the district headquarter, 130 km east of the state capital Lucknow. Faizabad was the first capital of the Awadh Kingdom and has monuments built by those Nawabs, like the Tomb of Bahu Begum and Gulab Bari. It was also the headquarters of Faizabad district (now Ayodhya district) and Faizabad division (now Ayodhya division) before November 2018. Faizabad is a twin city of Ayodhya and it is administered by Ayodhya Municipal Corporation.

== History ==
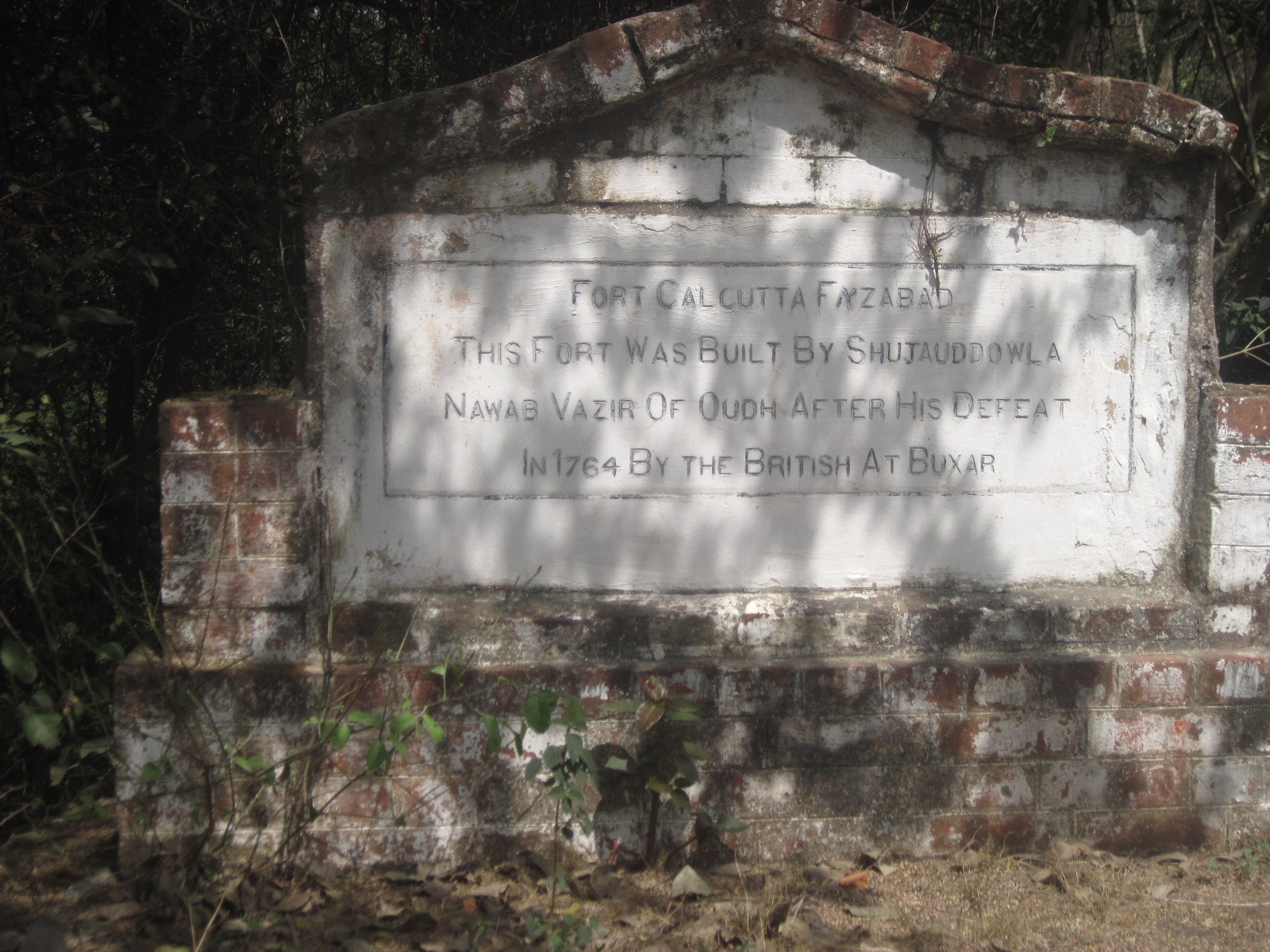
Fort Calcutta

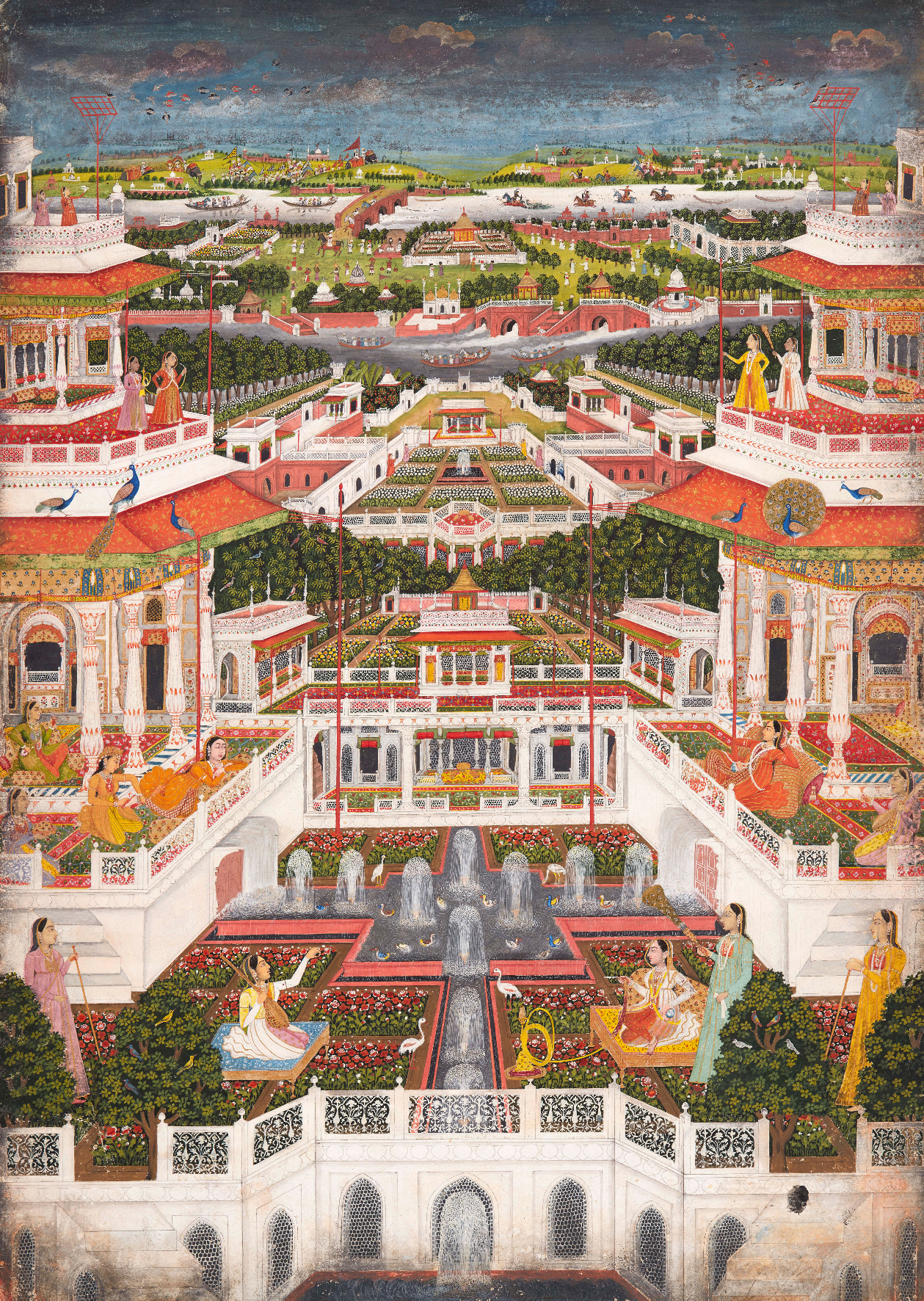
Miniature. "A Palace Complex with Harem Gardens" India, Faizabad or Lucknow; c. 1765

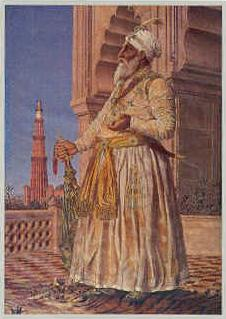
Saadat Khan, the first Nawab, who laid the foundation of Faizabad and made it the capital city

According to The Imperial Gazetteer of India, "[w]hen Saadat Khan was appointed governor of Oudh he built a hunting lodge 4 miles west of Ayodhya [in 1730], then the head-quarters of the province. Gardens were laid out and shops sprang up in the neighbourhood, and during the time of his successor Safdar Jang the name Faizabad was first applied. Shuja-ud-daula, the third Nawab, lived chiefly at Lucknow during the early part of his reign; but after his defeat at Buxar in 1764 he made Faizabad his residence, and during the remainder of his life added largely to its defences and also laid a large town. Shuja-ud-daula died early in 1775, and before the close of the year Asaf-ud-daula moved permanently to Lucknow. The importance of Faizabad declined, but it remained the home of Asaf-ud-daula's grandmother and mother, the Nawab Begam and Bahu Begam, whose treatment was the subject of charges against Warren Hastings. After the death of Bahu Begam in 1816 Faizabad decayed still farther". Oudh State was annexed by the British in 1856. Local self-government for Ayodhya and Faizabad was introduced in 1865. The two cities were administered jointly as a municipality.

=== Establishment of Princely state of Awadh ===
Gulab Bari stands in a garden surrounded by a wall, approachable through two large gateways. These buildings are particularly interesting for their assimilative architectural styles. Shuja-ud-daula's wife was the well known Bahu Begum, who married the Nawab in 1743 and continued to reside in Faizabad, her residence being the Moti-Mahal. Close by at Jawaharbagh lies her Maqbara, where she was buried after her death in 1816. It is considered to be one of the finest buildings of its kind in Avadh, which was built at the cost of three lakh rupees by her chief advisor Darab Ali Khan. A fine view of the city is obtainable from top of the begum's tomb. Bahu Begum was a woman of great distinction and rank, bearing dignity. Most of the Muslim buildings of Faizabad are attributed to her. From the date of Bahu Begum's death in 1815 until the annexation of Avadh, the city of Faizabad gradually fell into decay. The glory of Faizabad finally eclipsed with the shifting of capital from Faizabad to Lucknow by Nawab Asaf-ud-daula.

Faizabad was also a centre of one of many battles of the Mutiny of 1857. A detailed history of Faizabad can be read in 'Tareekh-e-Farahbaksh', written by Munshi Mohd. Faiz Baksh, (after whom Faizabad is named) a courtier in the Shuja-ud-Daula's court. This book has been translated into English by Hamid Afaq Qureshi as 'Memoirs of Faizabad'. Faizabad also finds a prominent and detailed mention in Guzashta Lucknow written by Abdul Halim Sharar. The fourth nawab of Awadh, Nawab Asaf-ud-Daula, shifted the Capital of Avadh to Lucknow in 1775 after his terms with his mother became sour.

=== Hanging of Ashfaqulla Khan ===
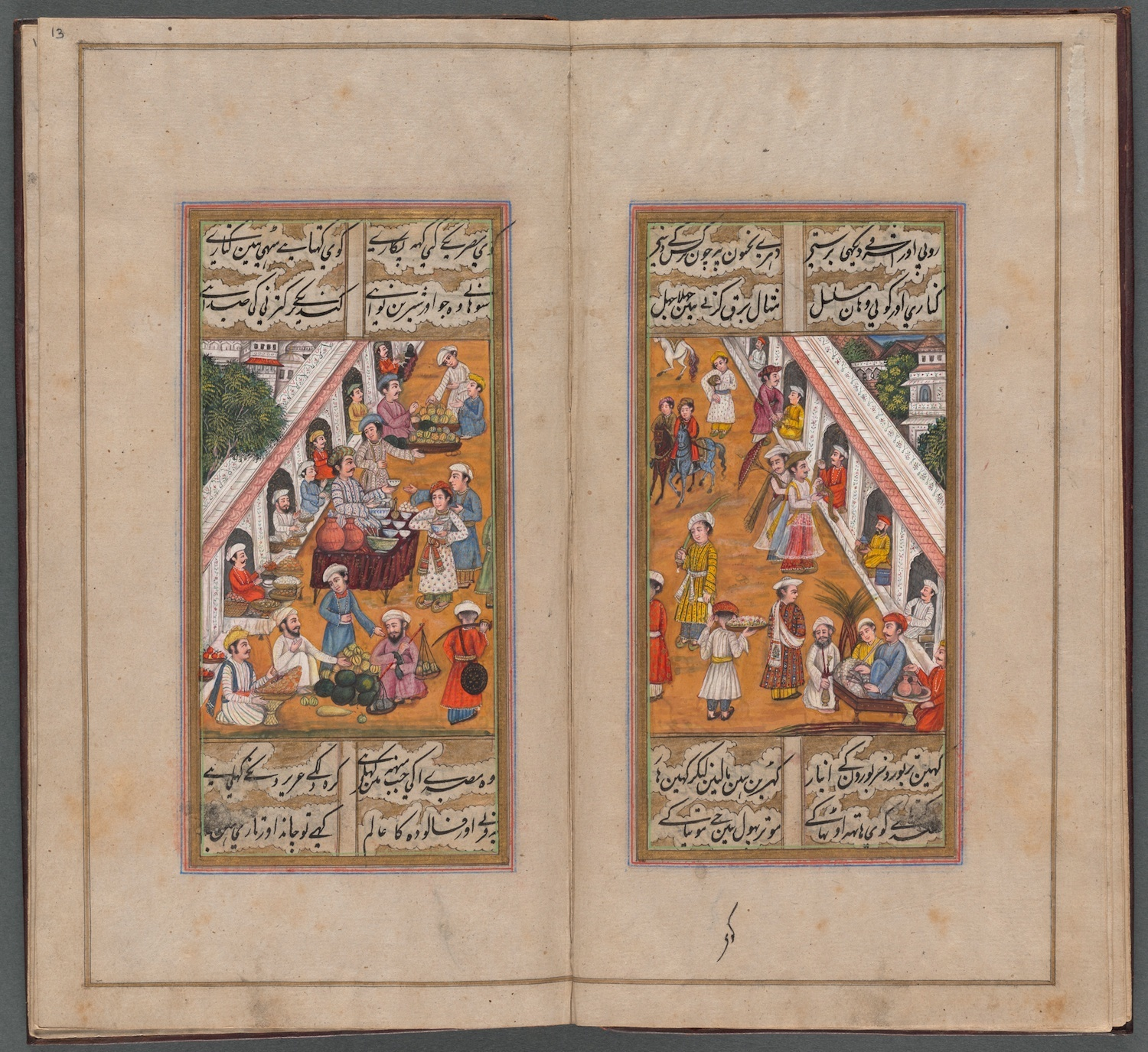
Small Street with Shops in Faizabad

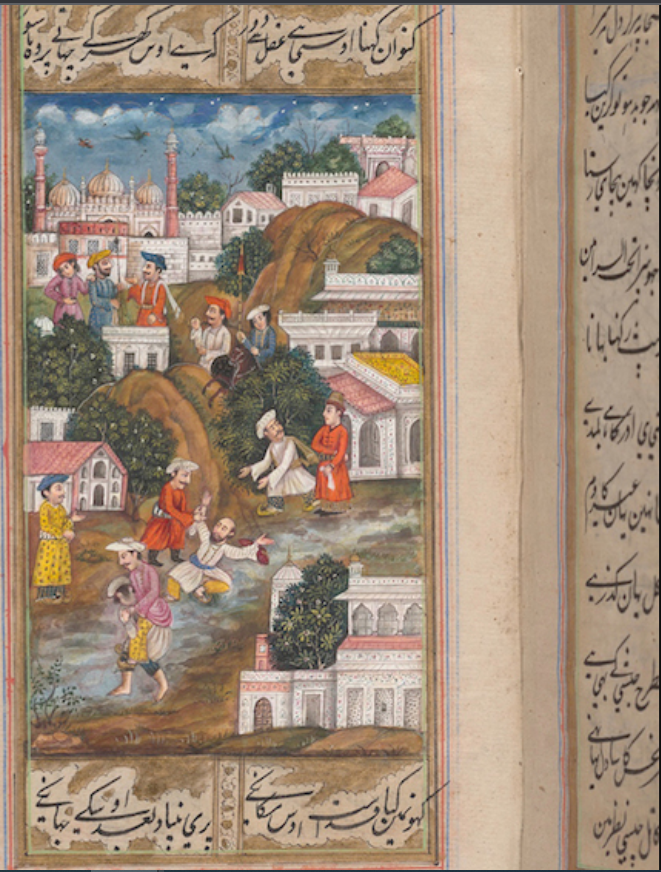
Difficult Roads Leading to Faizabad from‘Id ki tahniyat, 1822

Ashfaqulla Khan was hanged in Faizabad jail on 19 December 1927 for his role in the Kakori Train robbery on 9 August 1925.

== Demographics ==
Religions in Faizabad municipal council (2011)
1. Hinduism (69.9%)
2. Islam (28.3%)
3. Sikhism (0.83%)
4. Christianity (0.23%)
5. Jainism (0.06%)
6. Buddhism (0.04%)
7. Others (0.01%)
8. Not Stated (0.62%)

The 2011 Census of India has separate data for Faizabad municipal council (N.P.P.) and Faizabad Cantonment, which were counted as separate towns:

- Faizabad municipal council (N.P.P.), which had a population of 165,228 in 28,150 households.
- Faizabad Cantonment, which had a population of 12,391 in 2,014 households.

The following data are for Faizabad municipal council in the 2011 census.

- There were 85,620 males and 79,608 females. The sex ratio was 929.8 females per 1,000 males.
- There were 17,781 children of six and under: 9,310 boys and 8,471 girls, giving a sex ratio of 909.9 girls per 1,000 boys.
- There were 123,895 literates (84% of the population over six), of which 66,519 were male and 57,376 were female (78% and 72% of the male and female population over six).

The following data are for Faizabad Cantonment in the 2011 census.

- There were 7,744 males and 4,647 females. The sex ratio was 600.1 females per 1,000 males.
- There were 1,368 children of six and under: 716 boys and 652 girls, giving a sex ratio of 910.6 girls per 1,000 boys.
- There were 9,783 literates (89% of the population over six), of which 6,595 were male and 3,188 were female (85% and 69% of the male and female population over six).

Historical population of Faizabad (excluding the cantonment)
Year	Pop.	±%
1901	71,179	—
1911	54,655	−23.2%
1921	56,620	+3.6%
1931	59,992	+6.0%
1941	55,215	−8.0%
1951	76,582	+38.7%
1961	83,717	+9.3%
1971	102,835	+22.8%
1981	101,873	−0.9%
1991	124,437	+22.1%
2001	144,705	+16.3%
2011	165,228	+14.2%

Historical population of Faizabad Cantonment
Year	Pop.	±%
1931	5,726	—
1941	2,417	−57.8%
1951	5,916	+144.8%
1961	4,579	−22.6%
1971	6,971	+52.2%
1981	10,794	+54.8%
1991	11,843	+9.7%
2001	14,040	+18.6%
2011	12,391	−11.7%

== Geography ==
=== Climate ===
Typical of the central plains of India, Faizabad has a monsoon-influenced humid subtropical climate (Köppen Cwa). Summer (March to July) temperatures can range from 35 to 45 °C (95 to 113 °F), whilst winter (November to February) temperatures can range from 6 to 25 °C (42.8 to 77.0 °F). More than 85 per cent of the annual rainfall of 1,100 millimetres or 43 inches falls during the southwest monsoon from June to September.

Climate data for Faizabad (1971–2000, extremes 1959–2003)
Month	Jan	Feb	Mar	Apr	May	Jun	Jul	Aug	Sep	Oct	Nov	Dec	Year
Record high °C (°F)	28.5 (83.3)	35.8 (96.4)	41.7 (107.1)	45.5 (113.9)	46.0 (114.8)	47.4 (117.3)	41.6 (106.9)	39.2 (102.6)	37.8 (100.0)	37.7 (99.9)	35.8 (96.4)	31.0 (87.8)	47.4 (117.3)
Mean daily maximum °C (°F)	22.6 (72.7)	26.3 (79.3)	32.0 (89.6)	37.7 (99.9)	39.4 (102.9)	37.6 (99.7)	33.6 (92.5)	32.8 (91.0)	32.8 (91.0)	32.8 (91.0)	29.6 (85.3)	25.1 (77.2)	31.9 (89.4)
Mean daily minimum °C (°F)	7.4 (45.3)	10.1 (50.2)	14.3 (57.7)	19.7 (67.5)	23.7 (74.7)	25.4 (77.7)	25.0 (77.0)	24.6 (76.3)	23.3 (73.9)	19.1 (66.4)	12.6 (54.7)	8.0 (46.4)	17.7 (63.9)
Record low °C (°F)	0.8 (33.4)	1.8 (35.2)	7.6 (45.7)	11.4 (52.5)	17.7 (63.9)	16.4 (61.5)	18.0 (64.4)	18.2 (64.8)	15.2 (59.4)	7.4 (45.3)	3.0 (37.4)	1.0 (33.8)	0.8 (33.4)
Average rainfall mm (inches)	17.5 (0.69)	14.4 (0.57)	6.6 (0.26)	8.3 (0.33)	17.9 (0.70)	141.0 (5.55)	297.3 (11.70)	324.9 (12.79)	209.5 (8.25)	51.4 (2.02)	4.3 (0.17)	9.5 (0.37)	1,102.5 (43.41)
Average rainy days	1.4	1.5	0.8	0.7	1.4	5.5	12.3	12.4	8.1	2.2	0.2	0.7	47.3
Average relative humidity (%) (at 17:30 IST)	64	59	45	39	42	56	75	79	77	73	69	67	62
Source: India Meteorological Department

== Transport ==
=== By Road ===
Faizabad is situated on National Highway 27 and has connectivity with Kanpur (213 km), Lucknow (127 km), Varanasi (202 km), Prayagraj (161 km) and Gorakhpur (165 km). The state government's Road Transport Service runs regular and frequent buses to and from these cities. NH27 connects Lucknow to Barauni via Faizabad and Gorakhpur whilst NH330 connects Faizabad to Prayagraj via Sultanpur. Nawab Yusuf Road connects Faizabad to Varanasi via Jaunpur, NH330A connects Faizabad to Raebareli via Kumarganj, Ayodhya and Jagdishpur and NH 330 connects Faizabad to Bharich via Gonda, NH 330C is connected by Azamgarh to Faizabad via Ambedkar Nagar and Balrampur is connected by Faizabad via NH334 and Utraula and Mankapur connects Faizabad by SH14.

=== By Train ===
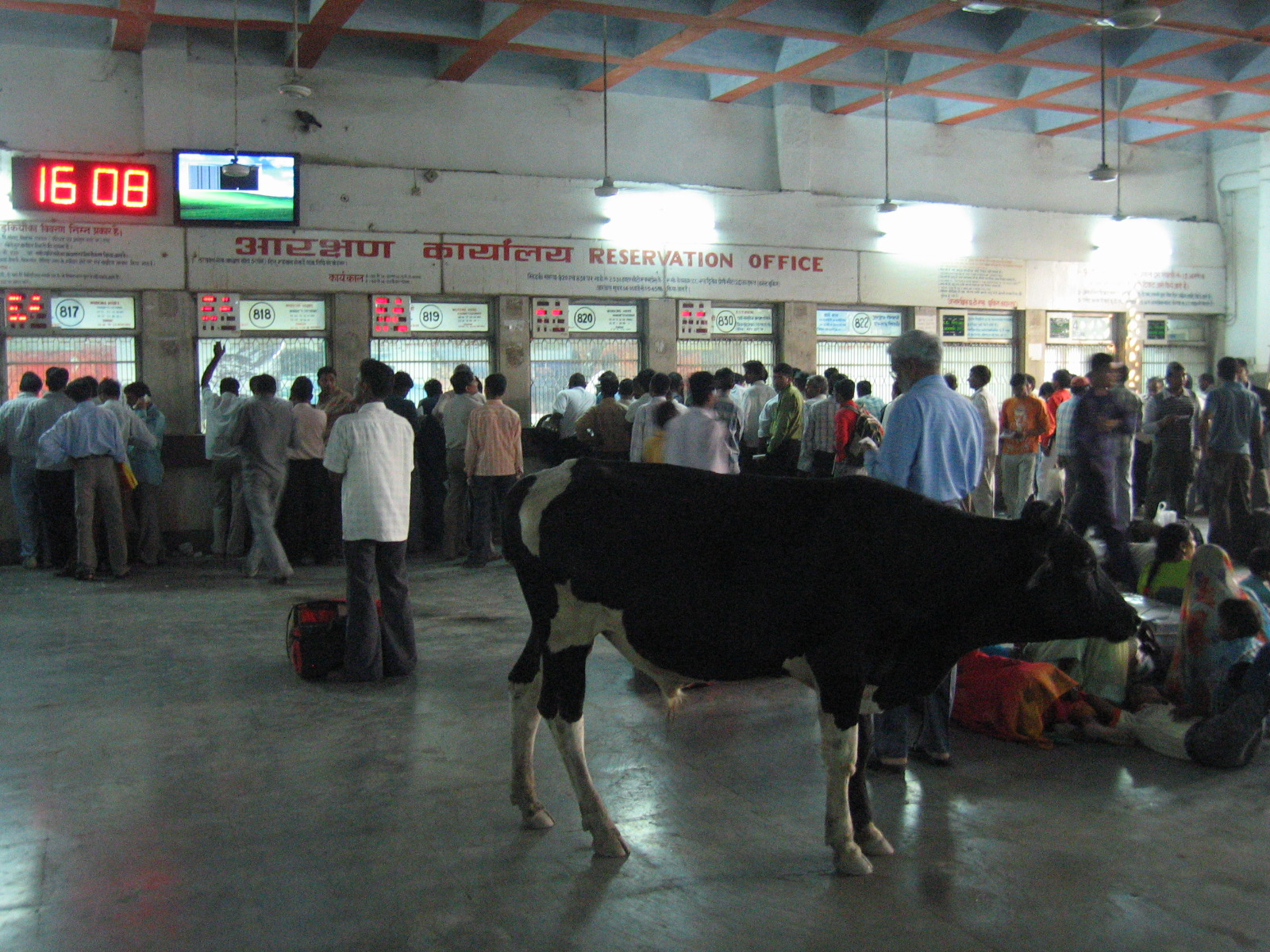
Ayodhya Junction railway station

Ayodhya Cantt railway station: the Indian Railways network connects Faizabad directly with Kanpur (4 hours) Lucknow (3 hours), Varanasi (4 hours.) and Prayagraj (5 hours).

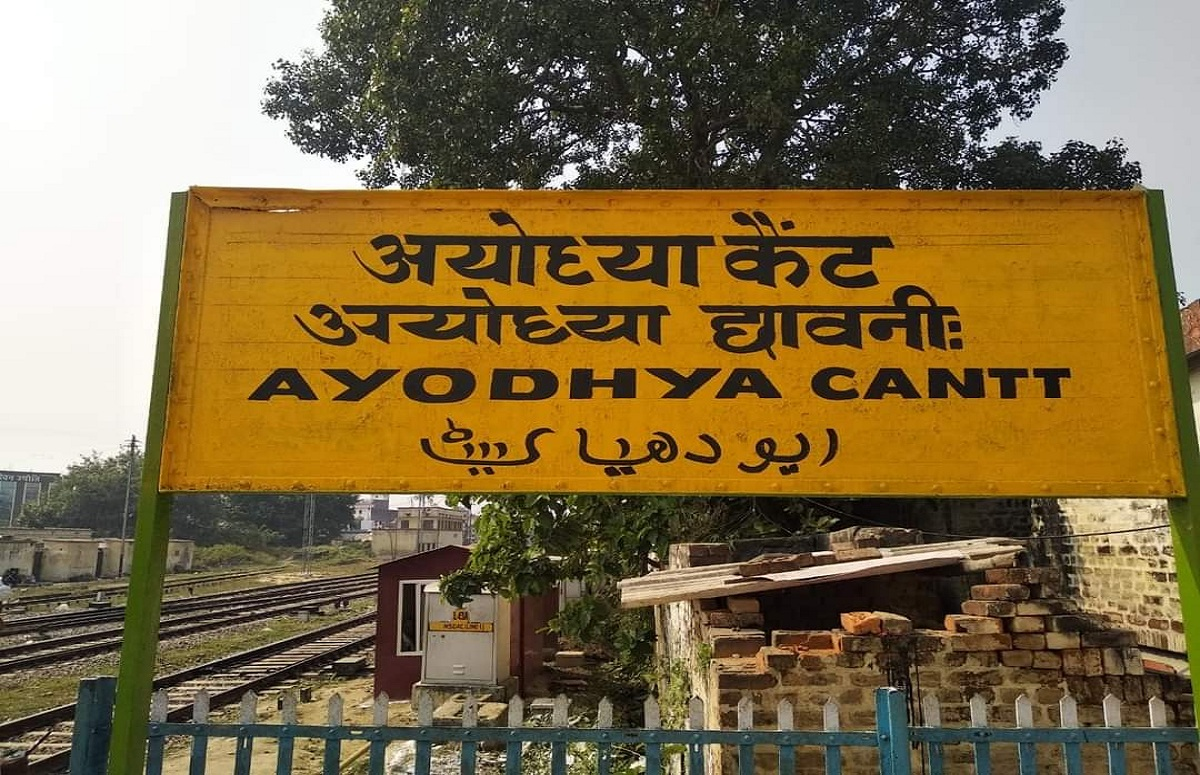
"Ayodhya Cantt railway station", formerly known as Faizabad station

Ayodhya Cantt Superfast Express is a train which runs weekly connecting Ayodhya Cantt railway station to Lokmanya Tilak Terminus, Mumbai. Its one of the two trains which runs between Faizabad to Mumbai the other one is Saket Express which runs twice a week. It is numbered as 22103/22104. Rameswaram - Faizabad Shraddha Sethu Express is a weekly Superfast Express connecting Rameswaram in Tamil Nadu and Faizabad in Uttar Pradesh. It takes nearly 3 days to reach the destination and one of the longest running train in India. A few mail express trains also connect Faizabad to Kolkata, New Delhi and Mumbai. In addition, the Faizabad-Delhi express runs daily from Faizabad to Delhi and Delhi to Faizabad, whilst a new railway line will be proposed from Lalganj to Faizabad via Raebareli Akberganj station.

Ayodhya Junction railway station: this is the second major railway station in Ayodhya district and is in Ayodhya city.

Acharya Narendra Dev Nagar railway station: This station is another gateway to the city via rail and it lies in the heart of the city.

=== By Air ===
The nearest airports to Faizabad are Ayodhya International Airport (5 km) from the city centre, Lucknow International Airport (128 km), Prayagraj Airport (144 km) and Varanasi International Airport (200 km).

== Places of interest ==
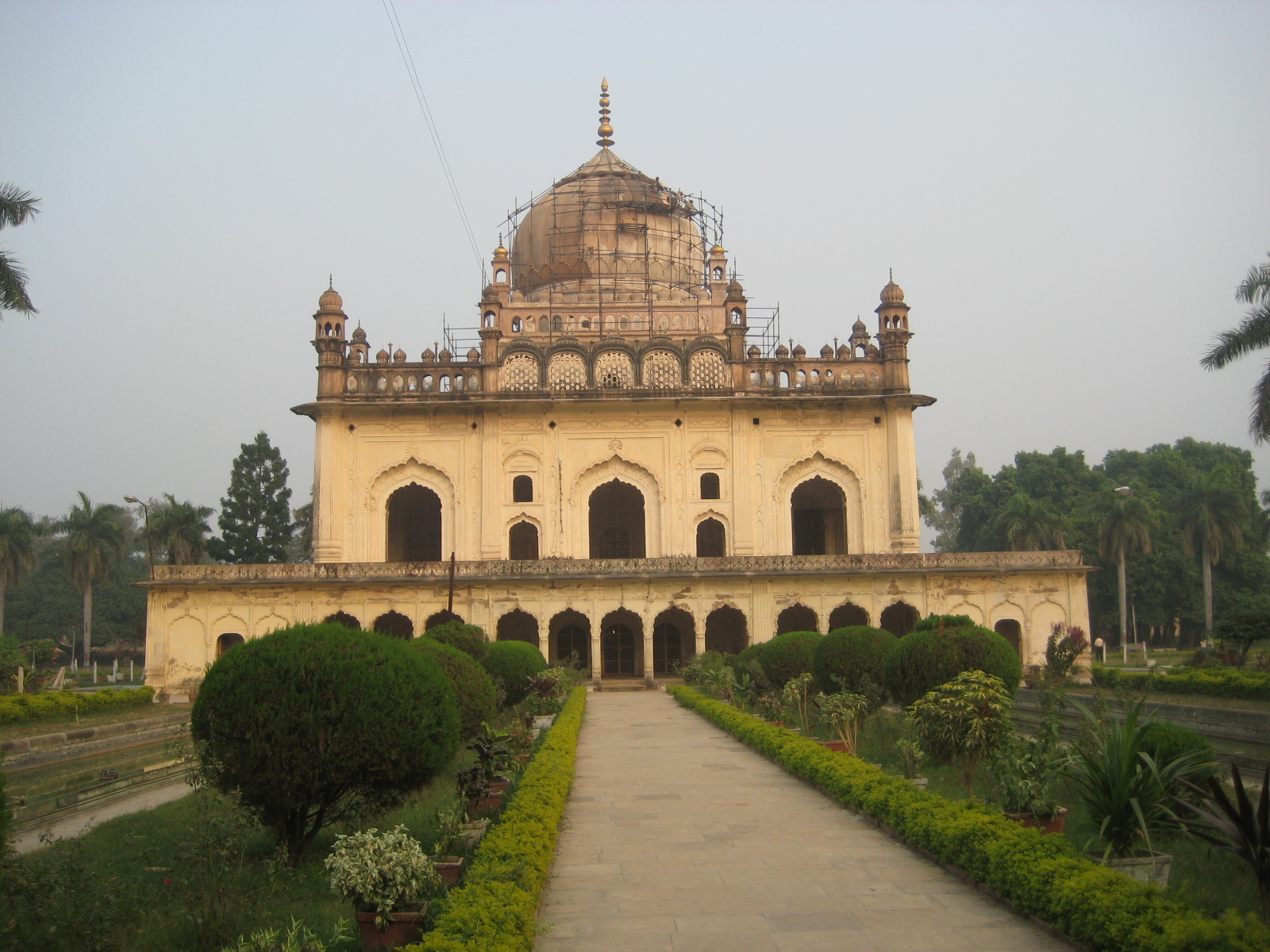
Gulab Bari is the tomb of the third Nawab of Awadh, Nawab Shuja-ud-Daula in Faizabad

Gulab Bari: Literally meaning 'Garden of Roses', the tomb of Nawab Shuja-ud-Daula (third Nawab of Awadh), this place has a collection of roses of various varieties set by the sides of water fountains. Gulab Bari also houses a maqbara (Mausoleum) of Nawab Shuja-ud-Daula in the campus.

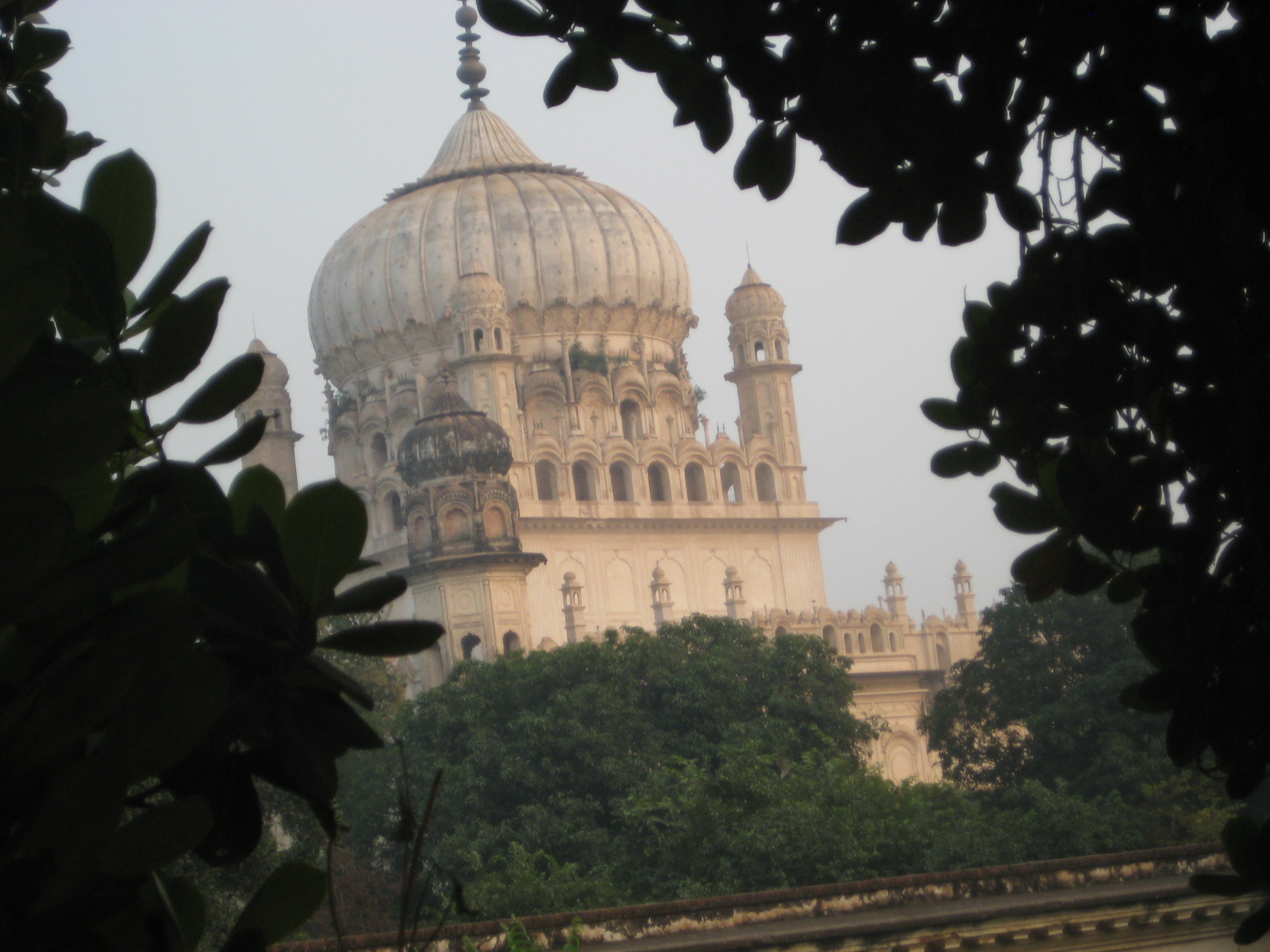
Bahu Begum ka Maqbara (Bahu Begum's Mausoluem) in Faizabad

Bahu Begum ka Maqbara: ("the mausoleum of the queen bride")is the memorial built for the queen of Nawab Shujah-ud-Daulah, Unmatuzzohra Bano Begum. It is one of the tallest buildings in Faizabad and is an example of non-mughal Muslim architecture.

Guptar Ghat: The ghat (jetty) where Lord Rama is believed to have taken 'jal samadhi' (leaving the earth for 'Baikuntha', the divine abode of Lord Vishnu, by drowning himself). It has view of the Saryu River and its green banks and has several ancient temples.

Company Gardens : Adjoining Guptar Ghat, on the banks of River Saryu, is Company Gardens, a botanical garden built during British Rule. it has a well maintained, sprawling garden set amidst lush greenery. It also has an orchard spread over acres. Plants and Trees can also be bought here. The remains of the fort built by Nawab Shuja-ud-Daula after the battle of Buxar is also within walking distance.

Ghanta Ghar: The heart of Faizabad city, houses a clock tower (Ghanta means 'clock' in Hindi and Ghar is the Hindi word for 'house') in the middle of the city centre. All distances within the city are measured from this location. The place is also known as Chowk, which houses the main vegetable and spice market in the town.

Shringi Rishi Ashram: 35 km from Faizabad in Goshainganj is ashram of Sage (Rishi in Sanskrit/Hindi) Shringi. Shringi Rishi performed 'Putrakameshti Yajya' for King Dashrath of Ayodhya, after that Lord Rama and his three brothers were born. There is an ashram of Shringi Rishi situated at Sherwaghat near Mehbubganj 11 km from Goshainganj on the banks of Saryu river at Sherwa Ghat. A temple of Shringi Rishi, is also located at Sherwaghat, and a fair is held every year in May in his honour. A cave is also located in Ayodhya district near Mehbubganj Near Goshainganj where he is supposed to have stayed.

Maharshi Balmiki Ashram Babuapur : Named after the saint Maharishi Balmilki who wrote Ramayan in Sanskrit language in the time of Lord Rama. It is located 28 km from Faizabad city in Babuapur village directly connected with Dilasiganj.

=== Shopping places ===
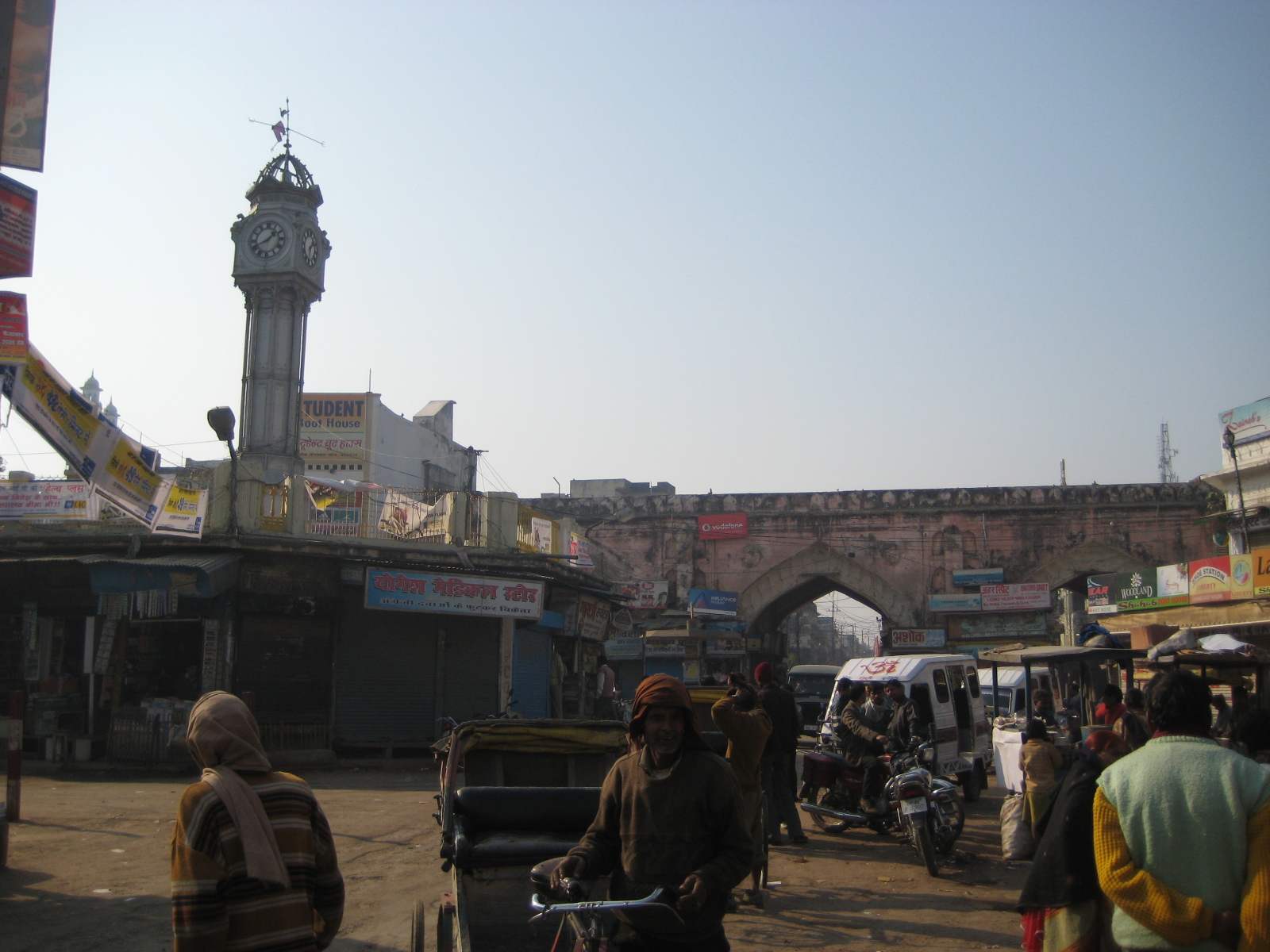
Faizabad Chowk, is the heart of the city.

Faizabad Chowk: Next to Ghanta Ghar, is the central market of Faizabad town. One can find vegetables, fruits and spices, jewellery shops, clothing and other retail.

Rikabganj: About a kilometre away from Chowk (towards Lucknow) lies the Rikabganj market which has a multitude of pharmacies. The market also has some seed shops which cater to the farmers of the adjoining regions.

Bajaja: (now known as Subhas Nagar)A place adjacent to Chowk towards Sultanpur Road holds a market for Clothes and garments. In Urdu Bajaja means cloth market. This area also holds major banks such as Union Bank of India, SBI and Allahabad Bank.

Fatehganj: This is a market mainly for wholesale grocery and other house hold items. This area is on the same road on which Bajaja falls. Hotel Krishna Palace is adjacent to the fountain near Ayodhya jail. This is the place which is near to Bus Station as well as Railway Station.

== Education ==
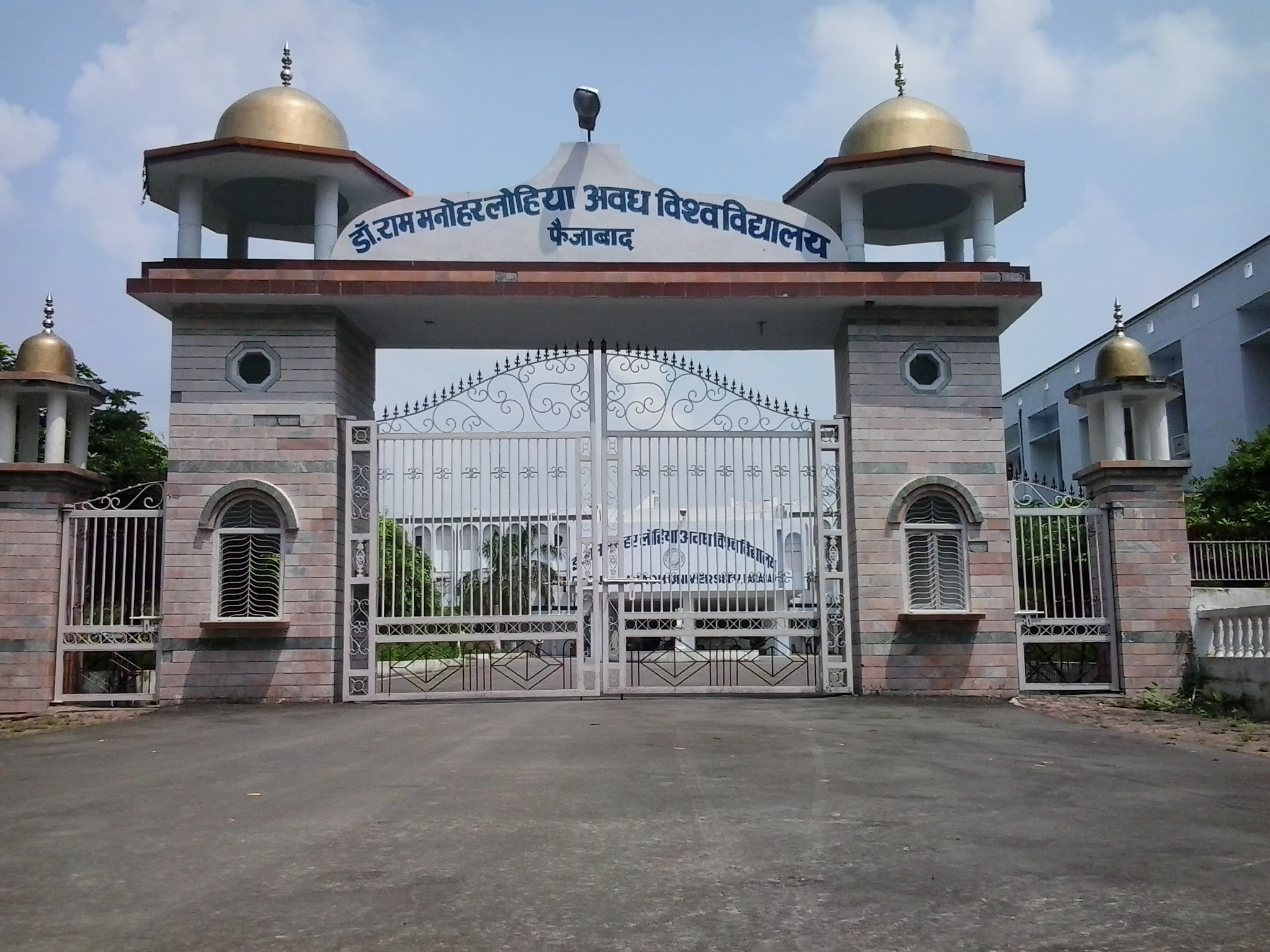
Avadh University

=== Universities ===
- Dr. Ram Manohar Lohia Avadh University
- Acharya Narendra Deva University of Agriculture and Technology

=== Other Colleges ===
- K.S. Saket P.G. College, which is on National Highway 28 between Faizabad and Ayodhya.

== Sports ==
Dr. Bhimrao Ambedkar International Sports Stadium Loc: 26°43′47″N 82°08′17″E is an international standard sports complex being built on NH 330 (Faizabad to Sultanpur Road) in Ayodhya district. The new sports complex would have astro turf, synthetic track, olympic size swimming pool, cricket field, hostels and other required facilities. It is the part of multi crore Rs. project for sports complex by state government. The Lokayukta office has received a complaint from one Bhanu Pratap Singh of Ayodhya who has accused the minister of corruption in the construction of Ayodhya International stadium. According to the complainant, the sports minister had a nexus with former sports director Hari Om and former project manager R.D. Prasad and had deliberately delayed the construction of the ₹ 86 crore Dr. Bhimrao Ambedkar stadium, paving the way for an escalation of costs to ₹ 1.50 billion.

== Notable people ==
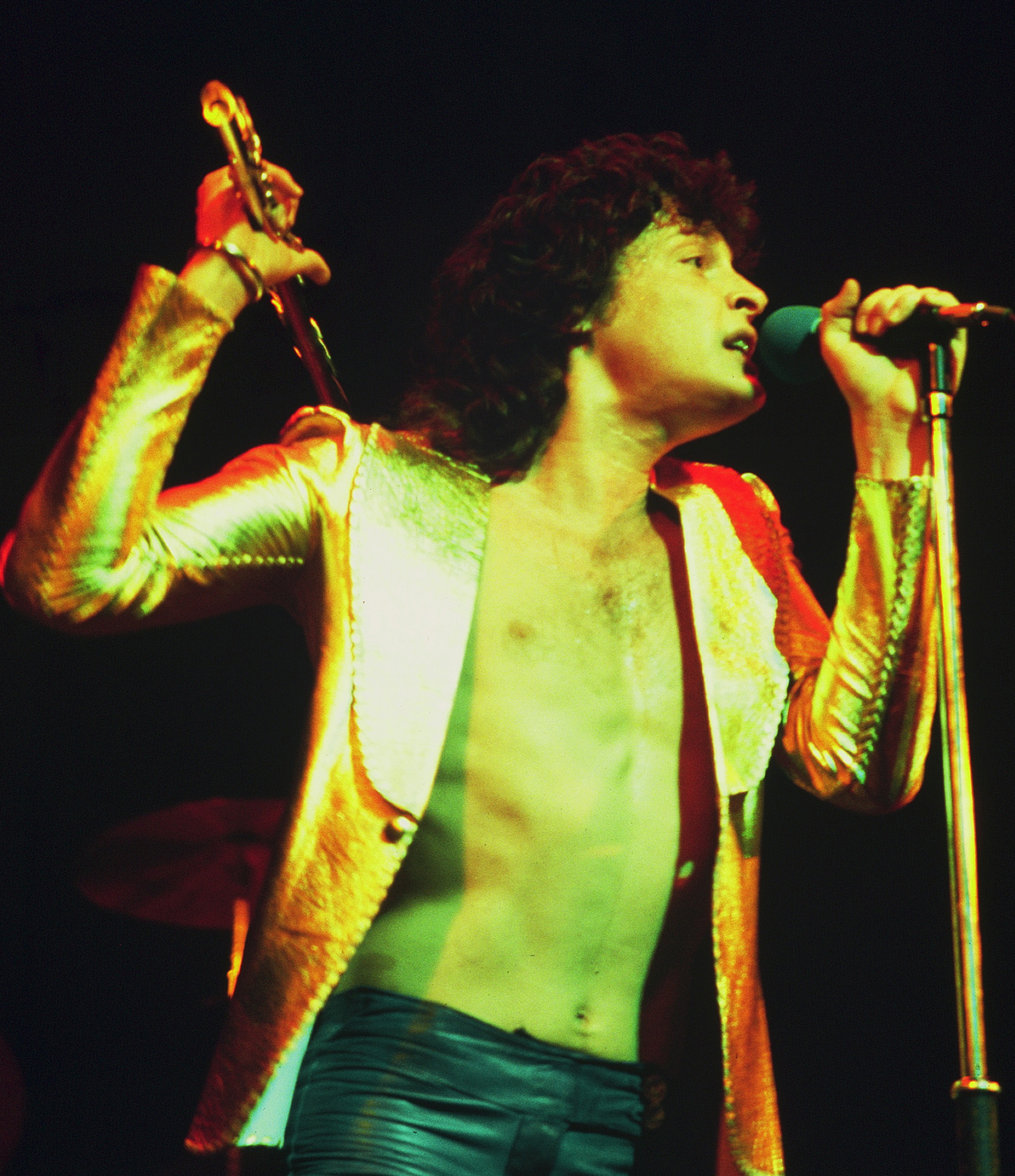
Barry Hay, the lead singer of the band Golden Earring

- Begum Akhtar or Akhtari Bai Faizabadi, singer
- Mir Anees, Urdu poet
- Pooja Batra, actress
- Brij Narayan Chakbast, nineteenth-century Urdu poet who is credited with the first translation of the Ramayana into Urdu
- Abhishek Chaubey, Bollywood film director
- Kathleen Crofton, an English dancer, was born is Faizabad
- Narendra Deva, political theorist
- Barry Hay, Dutch rock singer born in Faizabad
- Indu Jain, owner of Bennett, Coleman & Co. Ltd, Times of India Group, Forbes India's top 20 richest person
- Vinay Katiyar, politician
- Tariq Umar Khan, production designer, art director and film director in Bollywood
- Akhil Kumar, Indian boxer and Olympian
- Kunwar Narayan, Hindi poet
- Francis Quinton, an English cricketer, was born Faizabad.
- Manzoor Alam Quraishi, former Vice Chancellor, Dr. Ram Manohar Lohia Avadh University
- Mirza Muhammad Rafi Sauda, born in Faizabad.
- Ahmadullah Shah (1787–1858), Indian freedom fighter
- Anushka Sharma, Bollywood actress
- Lallu Singh, politician, won the 2014 and 2019 elections for the Faizabad (Lok Sabha constituency)
- Ravindranath Tewari, former minister
- Nivedita Tiwari, actress
- Brij Bhushan Mani Tripathi, Indian Politician
- Mitrasen Yadav, politician

== Gallery ==
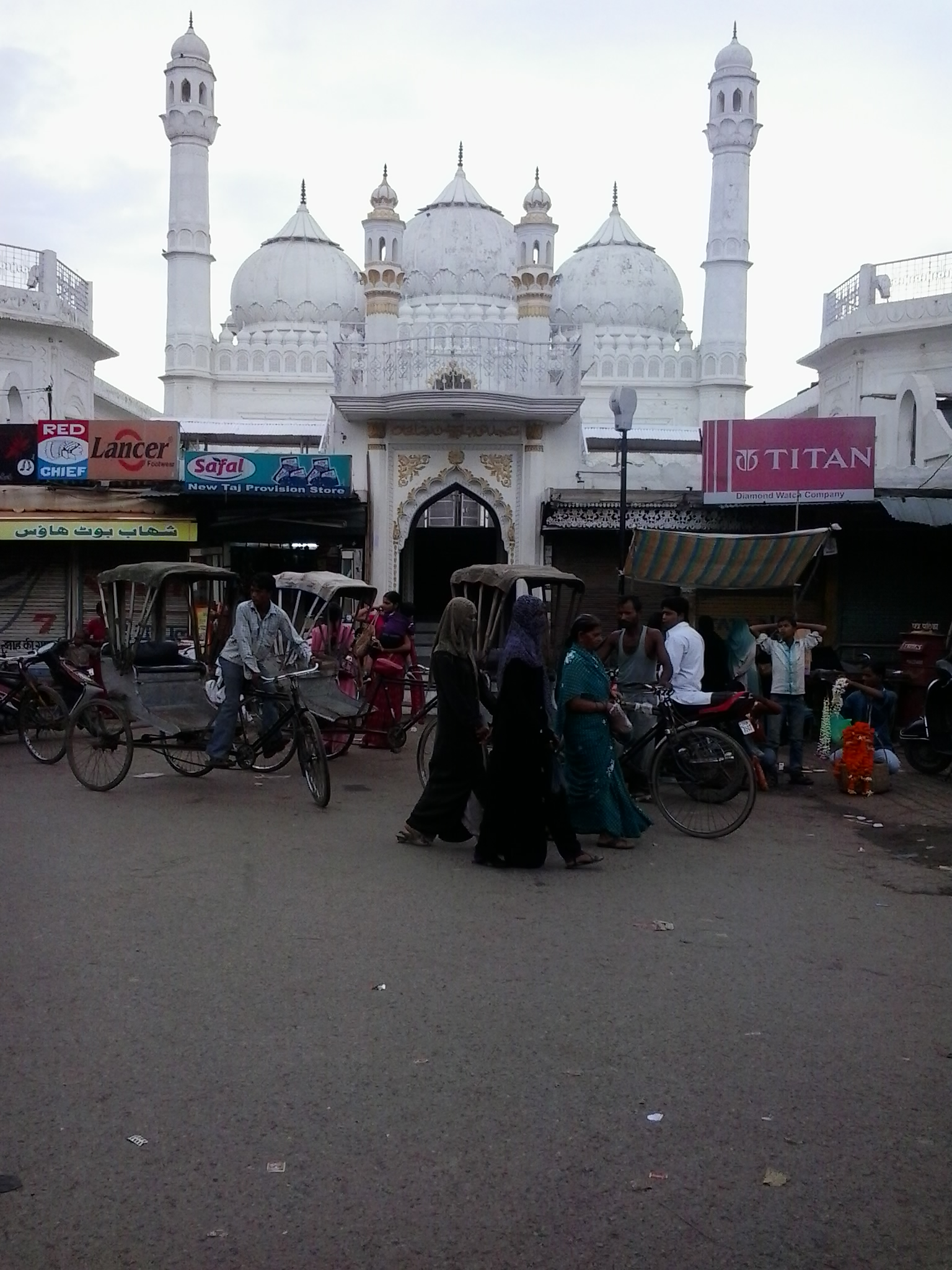

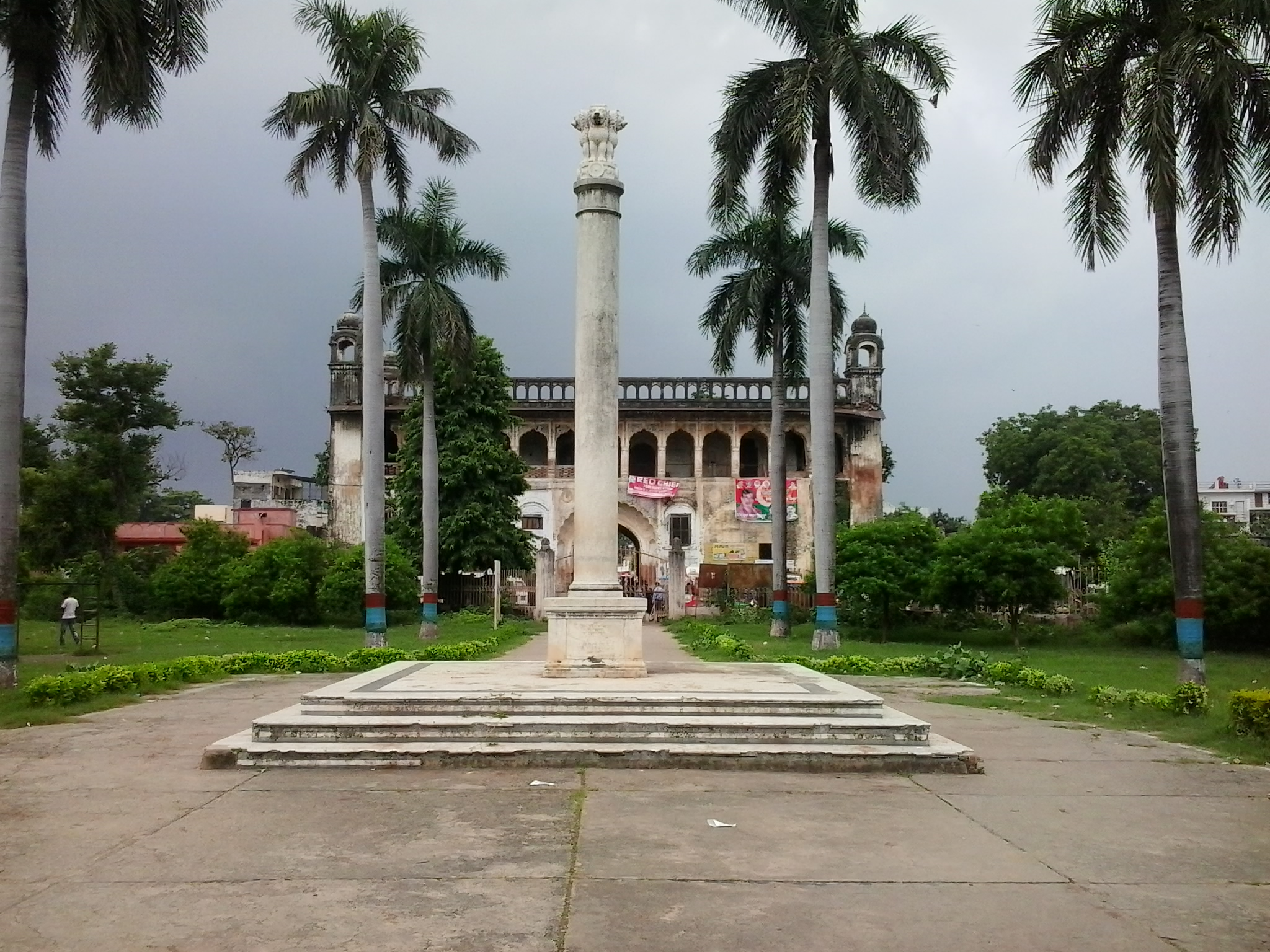

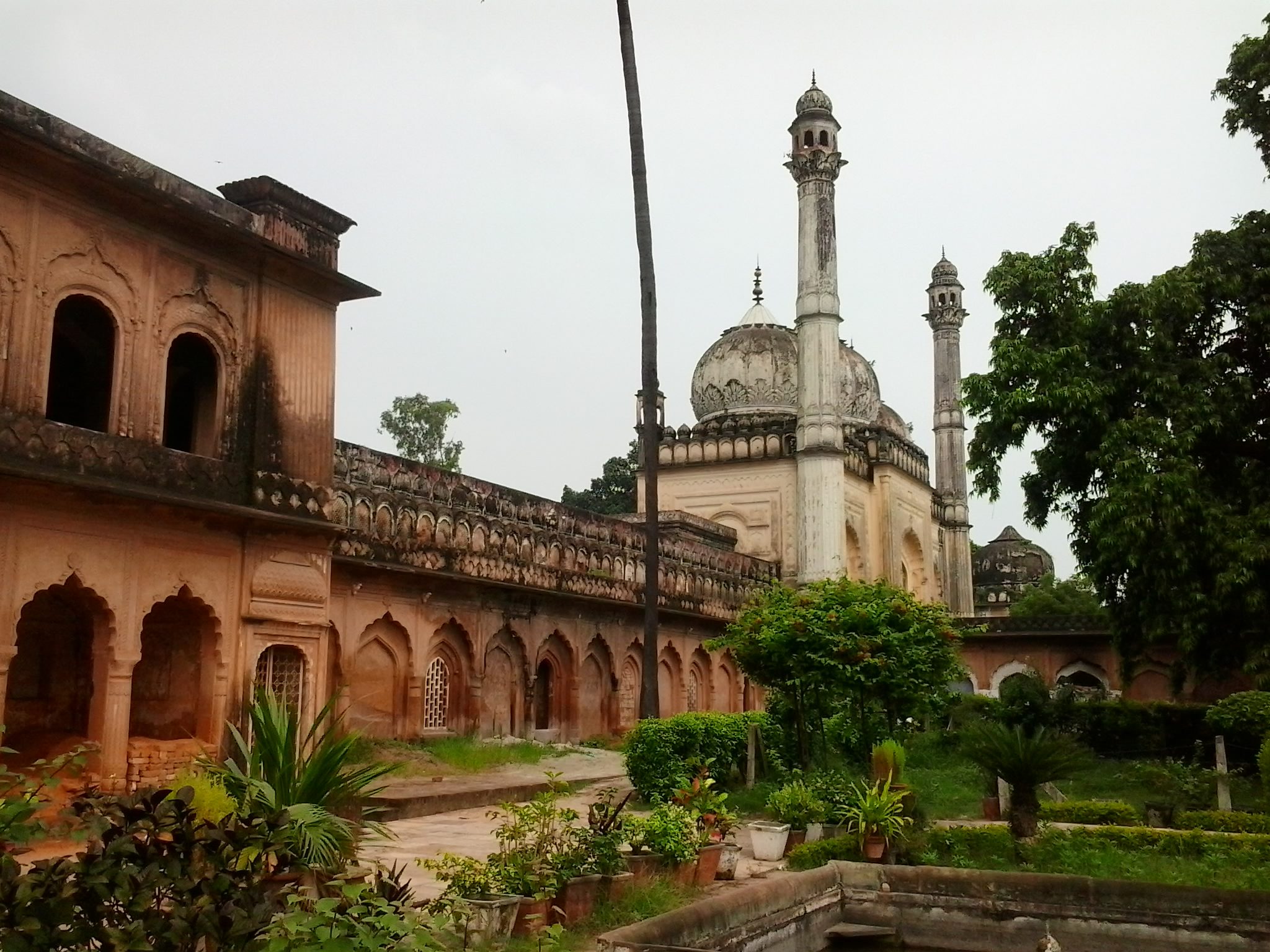

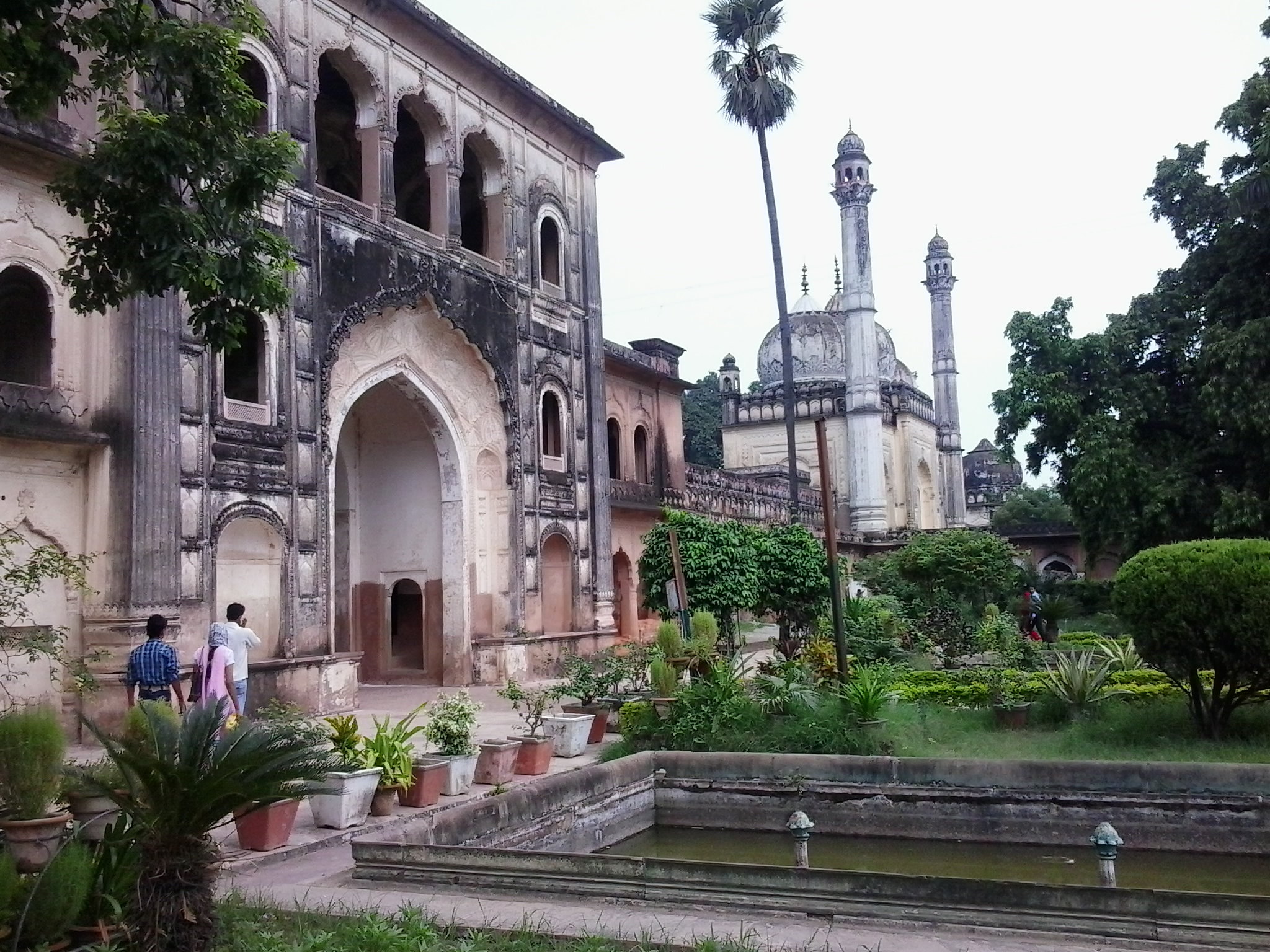

== See also ==
- Awadh
- History of Uttar Pradesh
