= Guzashta Lucknow =

Cultural history of Lucknow by Abdul Halim Sharar

- Author: Abdul Halim Sharar
- Original title: Guzashta Lucknow: Hindustan Mein Mashriqi Tamuddan Ka Akhri Namuna
- Translator: E.S. Harcourt; Fakhir Hussain
- Language: Urdu
- Subject: History of India
- Genre: Cultural history
- Publication date: 1926
- Publication place: India
- English publication date: 1975
- OCLC: 2331603

Guzashta Lucknow: Hindustan Mein Mashriqi Tamuddan Ka Akhri Namuna (Lucknow: The Last Phase of an Oriental Culture), popularly known as Guzashta Lucknow (English: Lucknow of the Past), is the socio-cultural history of Lucknow, India written by Abdul Halim Sharar.

== Publication history ==
In his introductory article, Sharar explained his aim in writing the history :

No one will perhaps questions the statement that the late court of Oudh was the final example of oriental refinement and culture in India,

There are several other courts to remind us of former times, but the one in which old culture and social life reached its zenith was this court of Oudh which was established not so long ago and, after making astonishing advances, came to an end in a very short time.

Therefore, I wish to write a brief account of the conditions and peculiarities of that court.

The articles published in Guzashta Lucknow were first serialised in Abdul Halim Sharar's journal Dilgudaz from 1913 to 1919. These articles were first included in the collected essays of Sharar, Mazamin-e-Sharar (in 13 volumes), published around 1926, and later separately published in book form. Since then it has gone into a number of editions, published from various places. An English translation with elaborate notes has been published under UNESCO Collection of Representative Works in 1975.

== Contents ==
Guzashta Lucknow is the collection of 54 articles. It tells the history of Lucknow and the rulers of Oudh, and describes the culture and way of life of the people of Lucknow during the late 18th and 19th centuries.

The initial chapters are concerned with the history of the area. Sharar picks up the strands of history from Faizabad and ends his chronicle with the exile Wajid Ali Shah in Matiya Burj, Calcutta and the First War of Independence. describes the founding of the town of Faizabad and its subsequent decay in the first chapter. In the next two chapters unfolds the history of Lucknow and various conjectures about its founding and naming as also the history prominent families residing in the city.

Chapter 4 describes the reign of Shuja-ud-Daula and Asaf-ud-Daula. The culture of Lucknow was in ascendancy during Asaf-ud-Daula's reign. Sharar writes that at the time "the court of Lucknow reached an unrivalled grandeur and splendour".

In later chapters, Sharar provides information about the various Nawabi buildings as well as about the various markets and mohallas (living quarters) that were built at the time. Sharar also mentions the most famous architectural wonder of Lucknow, namely the Asafi Imambara.

In two chapters, he narrates the development of Urdu poetry and explains its various forms including masnavi, marsiya, vasokht (a special kind of erotic verse), hazal goi (humorous verse) and rikhti (a verse form using women's idiom).

Chapter 11 describes in clear terms the evolution of prose from the ornate and formalised style into that of simplicity and clarity. About his own prose, Sharar writes that he emulated the style of Joseph Addison's essays.

The next chapter is concerned with dastangoi, the art of storytelling. Sharar describes the various devices used by the ordinary people for merriment in everyday life, namely phabti (satire), zila (double meaning), tuk bandi (rhyming), khayal and danda (writing poems about influential persons and events in satirical vein).

Two chapters each are set apart to describe the development of Islamic studies and Yunani medicine in Lucknow, and the significance of the Persian language and the contributions of Lucknow in calligraphy and Urdu printing.

In another chapter, Sharar details the different forms of self-defence in vogue in Lucknow, namely lakri (use of sticks), pata hilana (wooden sword), bank (knives), binaut (staves), kushti (wrestling), barchha (spears), bana (cudgels). tir andazi (archery), katar (stilettos) and jal bank (underwater fights).

A popular form of entertainment in Lucknow was watching fights of animals and birds. Sharar gives a vivid account of these in three consecutive chapters.

The development of music, dance and various entertainment form is described in five chapters that follow. One chapter is devoted to the art of Soz Khwani (elegy recitation), and its minute details.

== Translations ==
The book was translated into English by E.S. Harcourt and Fakhir Hussain in 1975. It was translated into Hindi as Purana Lucknow by Noor Nabi Abbasi.
