= Abdul Halim Sharar =

Indian author, playwright, essayist and historian

Abdul Halim
- Born: Abdul Halim Sharar; 4 September 1860; Lucknow, North-West Provinces, British India
- Died: 1 December 1926 (aged 66); Lucknow, United Provinces, British India
- Occupations: Novelist, poet, essayist, historian, playwright
- Writing career
- Period: 1885–1926
- Genres: Drama, nonfiction, history, personal correspondence
- Notable works: Firdaus-e-Bareen; Zawāl-e-Baghdad; Husn kā Daku; Darbar-e-Harampur; Guzishta Lucknow

Abdul Halim Sharar (Urdu: عبدالحلیم شرر; 4 September 1860 – 1 December 1926) was an Indian author, playwright, essayist and historian from Lucknow. He wrote 102 books. He often wrote about the Islamic past and extolled virtues like courage, bravery, magnanimity and religious fervour. Malikul Azia Vārjina (1889), Firdaus-e-Bareen (1899), Zawāl-e-Baghdad (1912), Husn kā Daku (1913–1914), Darbar-e-Harampur (1914) and Fateh Maftūh (1916) are some of his famous novels.

His book Guzishta Lucknow is still considered one of the best narratives describing the genesis of the city and its culture of Lucknow. Juya-e-Haq ("جویائے حق") is one of his lesser known works. It's the story of Salman the Persian, one of the companions of the prophet of Islam Muhammad. It is based on the letters of Salman to Bahira a Christian religious figure in Syria, about his journey to Madina to find the last prophet and description of Muhammad and his dealings. Abdul Haleem Sharar added the original text of letters in biography of Salman the Persian.

== Early life ==
Abdul Halim Sharar was born in Lucknow in 1860. His father Hakim Tafazzul Husain was a scholar of Islamic religion and Persian literature. Sharar was educated at home where he learnt Arabic and Persian. After spending the first nine years of his life at Lucknow, Sharar joined his father at Matiya Burj in Calcutta in 1869, who was in the court of the exiled King of Awadh, Wajid Ali Shah. Sharar remained at Matiya Burj till 1879, and he also contributed to the columns of the Urdu newspaper Avadh Akhbar as its Matiya Burj correspondent. He started learning Greek medicine system but did not finish it.

== Works ==
Firdous-e-Bareen (فردوس بریں): This historical content tells of an attempt to create a new sect, named فرقہ باطنیہ (Sect of Spirituality), and its leaders' conspiracy to rule out Islam and how they establish a highly secret society and invent an artificial Paradise. They would make people stunned by their network of spies. They would sneak up a person's personal life and would pretend to tell the hidden (غیب) then that person would become their devotee and would do anything they would demand. History shows they captured a lot of people and made them to kill many renowned people and Scholars (علماء). According to history Halaku Khan (ہلاکو خان) son of Ganges Khan or Changez Khan in Urdu چنگیز خان found these people and he disposed of them all. He authored a magazine dil gudaaz initially from Luckhnow and later from Hyderabad where he was in the service of Nizam of Hyderabad.

== Bibliography ==
- Firdaus-e-Bareen
- Hasan Angelina (1889)
- Guzishta Lucknow
- Malikul Aziz Varjinia (1889)
- Mansur Mohana (1890)
- Philpana
- Asray Qadeem
- Firdaus Bareen
- Islami Swaneh Umriaan
- Darbar-E- Harampur
- Afsana Qais
- Afsana e Mateen
- Agha Sadiq Ki Shadi

== Bibliography ==
- Raza, Jafar (2002). Abdul Halim Sharar: Hindustani Adab ke Memar [Abdul Halim Sharar: Makers of Indian Literature] (in Urdu) (2nd ed.). Delhi: Sahitya Academy.
