= Brij Bhushan Mani Tripathi =

Indian politician

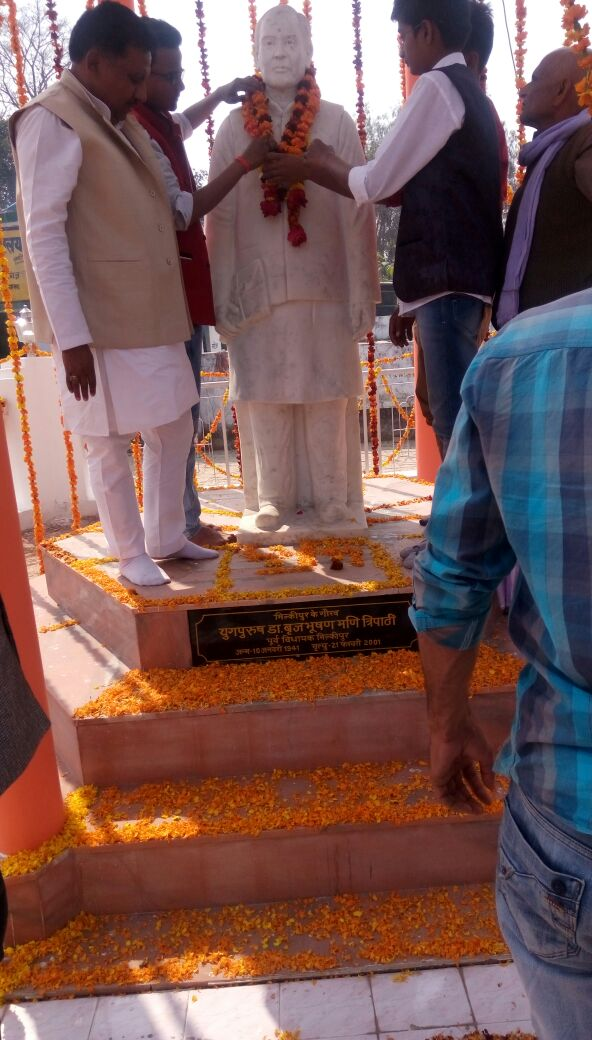
- Brij Bhushan Mani Tripathi Statue.jpg

Member:7th Uttar Pradesh Legislative Assembly
- In office 1989–1991
- Constituency: Milkipur Ayodhya

Personal details
- Born: 10 January 1941 Ayodhya, Uttar Pradesh
- Died: 21 February 2001 (aged 60) Ayodhya, India
- Party: Bharatiya Janata Party
- Profession: Politician

Brij Bhushan Mani Tripathi was a Member of Legislative Assembly and Indian politician affiliated with the Bharatiya Janata Party. He joined BJP and fought in the 1996 Election.

== Political career ==
He was elected consecutively 4 times block pramukh. Tripathi was elected in 1989 Assembly Election where he defeated Mitrasen Yadav who was a former three-time MLA on an Indian National Congress Party ticket. After defeating him he gained popularity and emerged as a great politician over time.

He was also provided with a sanctioned gunner from the government for safety purposes as he was convicted over with 12 criminal cases over him in 1996.

Tripathi also ran institutions in his constituency and did a lot of work for the upliftment of the people of the society. Later, BJP nominated him as a Member Of Legislative Council during the tenure of Rajnath Singh.

He died on 21 February 2001. At the time of his death, he represented Bharatiya Janta Party from Milkipur.

A statue was made in his constituency which was inaugurated by the Union Minister of State for Home Affairs of India, Shri Swami Chinmayanand at that time.
