= Firdaws-i Bareen =

Ancient Persian garden

Firdous e Bareen (Persian: فردوس برین, lit. 'The Highest Paradise') refers to the legendary ancient Persian garden located within the confines of the Alamut Fortress in the Elburz mountains of Northern Iran. This site gained prominence as the supposed sanctuary of Hassan-i-Sabah on the stories about him and his band of Nizari Assassins during the 11th and 12th centuries.

== History ==
The Alamut Fortress, strategically positioned in the mountainous terrain, became the headquarters for the Nizari Ismaili state during the Middle Ages. Established by Hassan-i-Sabah, Alamut was one of a network of fortresses which housed the Hashishin (also known as the Assassins) - a secretive Nizari Ismaili militant insurgency, known for its unorthodox methods of warfare. A book about the Paradise of the Assassins was published in 2005.

== Firdous e Bareen - The Paradise of Alamut ==
The term "Firdous e Bareen" is associated with the idea of a paradisiacal garden within the Alamut Fortress. It is believed to have served as both a secure refuge and a strategic base for the Hashshashin. The fortress provided a haven for its inhabitants, reflecting the tranquility and beauty often associated with Persian gardens.

== Legacy ==
Alamut and Firdous e Bareen gained widespread notoriety during the medieval period. Legends and stories about the Hashshashin's activities and their alleged training in the idyllic garden circulated throughout the Islamic world. The fortress eventually fell to the Mongol invasion led by Hulagu Khan in 1256.

== Controversies and Legends ==
The historical accounts of Firdous e Bareen remain surrounded by mystery and mythology, as the legends surrounding Alamut and the Hashshashin have been subject to embellishment over time. Nonetheless, the concept of this legendary garden within the Alamut fortress continues to capture the imagination, representing an intriguing chapter in Persian history and the medieval Islamic world.

== See also ==
- Hashishin
- Hassan-i-Sabah
- Alamut Castle
