= Acharya Narendra Dev Nagar railway station =

Railway station in Uttar Pradesh, India

General information
- Location: Ayodhya district, Uttar Pradesh; India
- Coordinates: 26.7754°N 82.1579°E
- Elevation: 108 metres (354 ft)
- System: Indian Railways station
- Owner: Ministry of Railways, Indian Railways
- Platforms: 2
- Tracks: 4
- Connections: Auto stand

Construction
- Parking: No
- Cycle facilities: No

Other information
- Status: Active
- Station code: ACND
- Fare zone: Northern Railways

History
- Former names: Oudh and Rohilkhand Railway
Location
- Location within India Location within Uttar Pradesh

Acharya Narendra Dev Nagar railway station was a small railway station in Ayodhya district, Uttar Pradesh, India. Its code was ACND. It serves Ayodhya city. The station consists of two platforms. The platforms are not well sheltered. It lacks many facilities including water and sanitation. This small station lies in the heart of the city near to chowk. It is another station to reach Ayodhya. Since the completion of doubling this station was closed for public.
