= List of Muslim military leaders =

Entries in this chronological list of Muslim military leaders are accompanied by dates of birth and death, branch of Islam, country of birth, field of study, campaigns fought and a short biographical description. The list includes notable conquerors, generals and admirals from early Islamic history to the 21st century.

== Muslim military leaders ==
- Muhammad (Arabic: مُحَمَّد, pronounced [muˈħammad];c. 570 CE – 8 June 632 CE) was the Islamic prophet and a political leader. He led the muslims against the tribes of Arabia. Most of Arabia was annexed in his lifetime in a series of coordinated campaigns. The most notable battles were Battle of Badr, Battle of Uhud, Battle of the trench, and Conquest of Mecca.
- Ali Ibn Abi Talib (Arabic: عَلِيّ ٱبْن أَبِي طَالِب, ʿAlī ibn Abī Ṭālib; 13 September 601 – 29 January 661), was nicknamed Haidar ('fierce lion') and Asadullah. He was a cousin and son-in-law of Muhammad. Ali was a successor of Muhammed (Fourth Rashidun caliph). He is traditionally considered to be one of the greatest and one of the most valiant Muslim warriors. He took part in almost all the battles fought by the nascent Muslim community. His contributions in the Battle of Khyber and the Battle of Badr are very well known.
- Hamza ibn Abdul-Muttalib (568-625) was a foster brother, companion and paternal uncle of Muhammad. He was killed in the Battle of Uhud on 22 March 625 (3 Shawwal 3 hijri). His kunyas were "Abū ʿUmārah" (أَبُو عُمَارَةَ) and "Abū Yaʿlā" (أَبُو يَعْلَىٰ). He had the by-names Asad Allāh (أَسَد ٱللَّٰه, "Lion of God") and Asad al-Jannah (أَسَد ٱلْجَنَّة, "Lion of Heaven"), and Muhammad gave him the posthumous title Sayyid ash-Shuhadāʾ (Arabic: سَيِّد ٱلشُّهَدَاء, lit. 'Chief of the Martyrs').
- Zayd ibn Harithah (581-629 CE). He is the only companion whose name is mentioned in the holy Qur'an (33:37). He was appointed as a military commander seven times by Muhammad. Aisha reported: "The Messenger of Allah, peace and blessings be upon him, never dispatched Zayd ibn Harithah with an army but he appointed him commander over them. If he had lived after the Prophet, he would have appointed him as the Caliph." He was killed in the battle of Mu'tah as the first commander.
- Hassan ibn Ali (Arabic:حسن ابن علی ), also known as 'Sebt e rasool' (grandson of Muhammadؐ). Hassan resembled Muhammad by his beauty and Ali in his bravery. Historical accounts prove his bravery in Battle of Siffin, Battle of the Camel and Battle of Nahrawan where he fought along with his father Ali and brothers Hussain and Abbas.
- Hussain ibn Ali (Arabic: حُسین ابن علی ), was the son of Ali and grandson of Muhammad. His courage on the day of Ashura against an army of 40 thousand where he stood alone proves his bravery and courage. He killed a total of 4,000 people in his attacks in the Battle of Karbala.
- ʿUmar ibn al-Khaṭṭāb (Arabic: عمر بن خطاب, romanized: ʿUmar bin Khaṭṭāb, also spelled Omar, c. 582/583 – 644) was the second Rashidun caliph, ruling from August 634 until his assassination in 644. He succeeded Abu Bakr (r. 632–634) as the second caliph of the Rashidun Caliphate on 23 August 634. Umar was a senior companion and father-in-law of Muhammad. He was also an expert Muslim jurist known for his pious and just nature, which earned him the epithet Al-Fārūq ("the one who distinguishes (between right and wrong)").
- Usama bin zayd (615 – 680 CE) he also received the qualities of leadership like his father Zayd ibn Harithah. He was only eighteen when he was appointed as a commander of a huge army. He is the first youngest commander in Islamic history. Usama bin Zayd relates: That Muhammad used to take him (ie Usama) and Al-Hassan (in his lap) and say: "O Allah! Love them, as I love them".
- Khalid ibn al-Walid: 592-642 (Arabic: خالد بن الوليد), also known as "The Sword of Allah" (a title bestowed upon him by Muhammad), was an Arab Muslim commander who was in the service of Muhammad and the caliphs Abu Bakr (r. 632–634) and Umar (r. 634–644). He played a leading role in the Ridda wars against rebel tribes in Arabia in 632–633 and the early Muslim conquests of Sasanian Iraq in 633–634 and Byzantine Syria in 634–638. Khalid ibn al-Walid was one of the few undefeated generals in history.
- Abdallah ibn Sa'd, during his time as governor of Egypt (646 CE to 656 CE), Abdallah ibn Sa'd built a strong Arab navy. Under his leadership the Muslim navy won a number of victories including its first major naval battle against the Byzantine emperor Constans II at the Battle of the Masts in 654 CE.

=== 8th century ===
- Maslama ibn Abd al-Malik was an Umayyad prince and one of the most prominent Arab generals of the early decades of the 8th century, leading several campaigns against the Byzantine Empire and the Khazar Khaganate. He achieved great fame especially for leading the second Arab siege of the Byzantine capital Constantinople.
- Sa'id ibn Abd al-Malik, also known as Sa'id al-Khayr (Sa'id the Good), was an Umayyad prince, governor and military leader
- Tariq ibn-Ziyad (670–720), a Berber general, he was a governor in Tangier (city in Morocco). He was later ordered by Musa ibn Nusayr to lead the Muslim army to conquer Hispania.
- Abdul Rahman Al Ghafiqi, a Spanish Umayyad general born in Yemen who fought Charles Martel twice in France in the battles of Tours and Narbonne, and was defeated in both engagements
- Maslama ibn Hisham, also known as Abu Shakir, was an Umayyad prince and military commander
- Sulayman ibn Hisham was an Arab general, the son of the Umayyad Caliph Hisham ibn Abd al-Malik (r. 723–743). He is known for his participation in the expeditions against the Byzantines.
- Zaid ibn Ali, an Arab who fought the Banu Umayyad
- Muhammad bin Qasim (695–715), an early Arab General who captured Sindh and Multan and parts of Punjab in Pakistan
- Isma'il ibn Jafar, an Arab who fought the Banu Umayyad
- Marwan II, the last Umayyad Caliph and a military leader
- Qutaibah bin Muslim, an Arab Muslim general who captured Transoxiana
- Abdallah ibn Ali, Abbasid General and Governor of Syria
- Salih ibn Ali, Abbasid General and Provincial Governor
- Abu Muslim, the Abbasid general, Governor of Khorasan under As-Saffah
- As-Saffah, Abbasid Caliph, founder of the Abbasid dynasty and a military leader
- Al-Mansur, Abbasid Caliph and a powerful military leader
- Al-Mahdi, Abbasid Caliph and a powerful military leader
- Abd al-Malik ibn Salih (died 812) was a member of the Cadet branch of the Abbasid dynasty who served as general and governor in Syria and Egypt. He distinguished himself in several raids against the Byzantine Empire.
- Idris I of Morocco, founder of the Idrisid dynasty

=== 9th century ===
- Al-Amin Abbasid Caliph and a military leader.
- Al-Abbas ibn al-Ma'mun Famous Abbasid Prince and a military leader.
- Al-Mu'tasim Abbasid Caliph and the powerful military leader.
- Al-Muwaffaq Abbasid Prince and a talented military leader, brother of Caliph Al-Mu'tamid.
- Al-Mu'tadid Abbasid Caliph and a powerful military leader (892-902).
- Tahir ibn Husayn d.822: A soldier of the Abbasid Empire.
- Ibrahim ibn Muhammad al-Hashimi, known as Burayh was an Abbasid Military leader in 9th century involved in the defense of Basra during the Zanj rebellīon war, and later served as a governor of Mecca.

=== 10th century ===
- Mahmud of Ghazni 971–1030: Ruler of Ghazni. Conquered the temple of Somnath.
- Abd al-Rahman III 8th Umayyad Emir of Córdoba.
- Jawhar as-Siqilli: A commander of Fatimid forces, he founded Cairo and built Al-Azhar Mosque.
- Ziri ibn Manad Founder of Zirid Dynasty who played a major part in defeating the rebellion of Abu Yazid, he also killed caliph Ibn Wasul of Sijilmasa
- Abdallah Ibn Yasin, was a Moroccan theologian, founder and first leader of the Almoravid movement and dynasty.

=== 11th century ===
- Alp Arslan Muhammad Ālp Ārslan ibn Dawūd Persian: ضياء الدنيا و الدين عضد الدولة ابو شجاع محمد آلپ ارسلان ابن داود; 20 January 1029 – 15 December 1072, real name Muhammad bin Dawud Chaghri, was the second Sultan of the Seljuk Empire and great-grandson of Seljuk, the eponymous founder of the dynasty. He greatly expanded the Seljuk territory and consolidated his power, defeating rivals to south and northwest and his victory over the Byzantines at the Battle of Manzikert, in 1071, ushered in the Turkoman settlement of Anatolia.[2] For his military prowess and fighting skills he obtained the name Alp Arslan, which means "Heroic Lion" in Turkish.
- Malik-Shah I: Sultan of Seljuk Empire, son of the great Sultan Alp Arslan, who took his empire to a greatest extent. Malik-Shah, along with the vizier Nizam al-Mulk, tried to unite Muslims of the world and fought many wars against anti Islamic fitna movement called Batiniyya, he also built many madrasahs. He is considered one of the greatest Muslim leaders of all time.
- Tughril Beg: founder of the Seljuq Dynasty. He united many Turkmen warriors of the Central Asian steppes into a confederacy of tribes, who traced their ancestry to a single ancestor named Seljuk, and led them in conquest of eastern Iran. He would later establish the Seljuk Sultanate after conquering Iran and retaking the Abbasid capital of Baghdad from the Buyids in 1055. Tughril relegated the Abbasid Caliphs to state figureheads and took command of the caliphate's armies in military offensives against the Byzantine Empire and the Fatimids in an effort to expand his empire's borders and unite the Islamic world.
- Yusuf ibn Tashfin: founder of the Almoravid Dynasty in the Islamic West, he secured several decisive military victories against the Christians in Al-Andalus and was able to reunify it under his rule after a period of internal fragmentation known as Muluk Al-Tawaif.
- Ibn Tumart: Founder of the Almohad dynasty.
- Ahmad Sanjar: Sultan of Seljuk Empire, son of Malik-Shah I.

=== 12th century ===
- Muhammad of Ghor
- Nur ad-Din Zangi 1118–1174: A Syrian ruler and military leader who fought in the Crusades.
- Ṣalaḥ ad-Dīn Yusuf bin Ayyub 1137-1193: He unified Egypt, Syria, and Palestine under his rule, led the Muslims to victory at the Battle of Hattin and was able to reclaim several cities from the Crusaders, especially Jerusalem.
- Al-Adil I: He commanded the Muslims during a number of Crusades in the middle east. He was Saladin's brother.
- Saif ad-Din Ghazi I: A leader during the crusades.
- Al-Muqtafi Abbasid Caliph of Baghdad and a military leader.
- Al-Nasir Abbasid Caliph and a military leader.
- Abd Al-Mu'min The first caliph of Almohad Caliphate, who defeated the Almoravids and also brought the Maghreb and Al Andalus under one creed and government
- Mu'in ad-Din Unur
- Yaghmurasen Ibn Zyan Founder of the Zayyanid dynasty Yaghmurasan ben Ziyan ben Thabet ben Mohamed ben Zegraz ben Tiddugues ben Taaullah ben Ali ben Abd al-Qasem ben Abd al-Wad) was the founder of the Zayyanid dynasty. Under his reign the Zayyanid Kingdom of Tlemcen extended over present-day north-western Algeria.
- Abu Yusuf Yaqub ibn Abd al-Haqq Sultan of the Marinid dynasty of Morocco defeated the Spanish in the Battle of Écija (1275).
- Eldiguz 1st Atabeg of Azerbaijan. Founder of the Eldiguzid dynasty
- Muhammad Jahan Pahlavan 2nd Atabeg of Azerbaijan
- Qizil Arslan 3rd Atabeg of Azerbaijan

=== 13th century ===
- Ertuğrul Ghazi: Father of Osman I, leader of the Kayi tribe and the Margrave or uch bey in the service of Sultanate of Rum. He made the town of Söğüt, which he captured, his capital. He reportedly also conquered Karacahisar Castle.
- Osman Ghazi I: The Son of Ertuğrul Gazi, The founder and the first sultan of the Ottoman Empire. who defeated Byzantine Empire and Mongols he conquered a significant portion of the Byzantine Empire; and laid siege to important cities such as Nicaea (Iznik), Prusa (Bursa) - which were conquered soon after his death.
- Orhan Ghazi I: Son of Osman I, he continued conquering the western areas of Anatolia which were controlled by the Byzantine Empire, such as Nicomedia and Edirne. Orhan's reign saw Ottoman territory nearly doubled.
- Qutb-ud-din Aybak: He built the Qutub Minar.
- Az-Zahir: Abbasid Caliph and a military leader.
- Jalal al-Din Mangburni: The last Khwarazmshah, He defeated the Mongols in the Battle of Parwan and was the uncle of Qutuz.
- Al-Nasir: Abbasid Caliph and a military leader.
- Shams ud-Din Iltutmish: He conquered Multan and Bengal from contesting rulers, and Ranthambhore and Siwalik from their rulers.
- Razia Sultana: Daughter of Iltutmish; ruled Delhi Sultanate, known as first female Muslim ruler in India.
- Shah Jalal: Known to have propagated Islam into north-eastern Bengal after a long history of travel between the Middle East, Persia, Central Asia and South Asia.
- Al-Kamil: An Ayyubid Sultan of Egypt.
- Salih Ayyub: He defeated the Crusaders in the Battle of La Forbie, liberating Jerusalem.
- Baibars: Fourth Sultan of Egypt (Bahri dynasty); defeated Crusaders and Mongols; known for consolidation of Mamluk power.
- Saif ad-Din Qutuz: The first Mamluk Sultan to rule Egypt and Syria. Defeated 7th Crusade as an Ayyubid officer. He became the Mamluk Sultan in 1259 and defeated the Mongols at The Battle of Ain Jalut, bringing an end to the myth of Mongol Invincibility.
- Qalawun: Mamluk Sultan who fought Crusaders.
- Al-Ashraf Khalil: Mamluk Sultan, son of Qalawun, defeated Crusaders in the Battle of Acre (1291).
- Ghiyas ud din Balban
- Alauddin Khalji: A Turko-Afghan sultan of Delhi who fought the Mongols.
- Berke Khan: Grandson of Genghis Khan, he established Islam as the state religion of the Golden Horde and fought with the Ilkhanate.
- Kayqubad I: The 11th ruler of the Seljuk Sultanate of Rum who fought the Byzantines and Mongols.

=== 14th century ===
- Murad I (Ottoman Turkish: مراد اول; Turkish: I. Murad, Murad-ı Hüdavendigâr (nicknamed Hüdavendigâr, from Persian: خداوندگار, romanized: Khodāvandgār, lit. 'the devotee of God' – meaning "sovereign" in this context); 29 June 1326 – 15 June 1389) was the Ottoman Sultan from 1362 to 1389. He was a son of Orhan Gazi and Nilüfer Hatun. Murad I came into the throne after his elder brother Süleyman Pasha's death.
- Bayezid I: The Fourth Sultan of Ottoman Empire and The victor at the Battle of Nicopolis
- Zheng He 1371–1433: A Chinese mariner, explorer and admiral who was born into a Muslim family but embraced a broader ranging religious faith later.

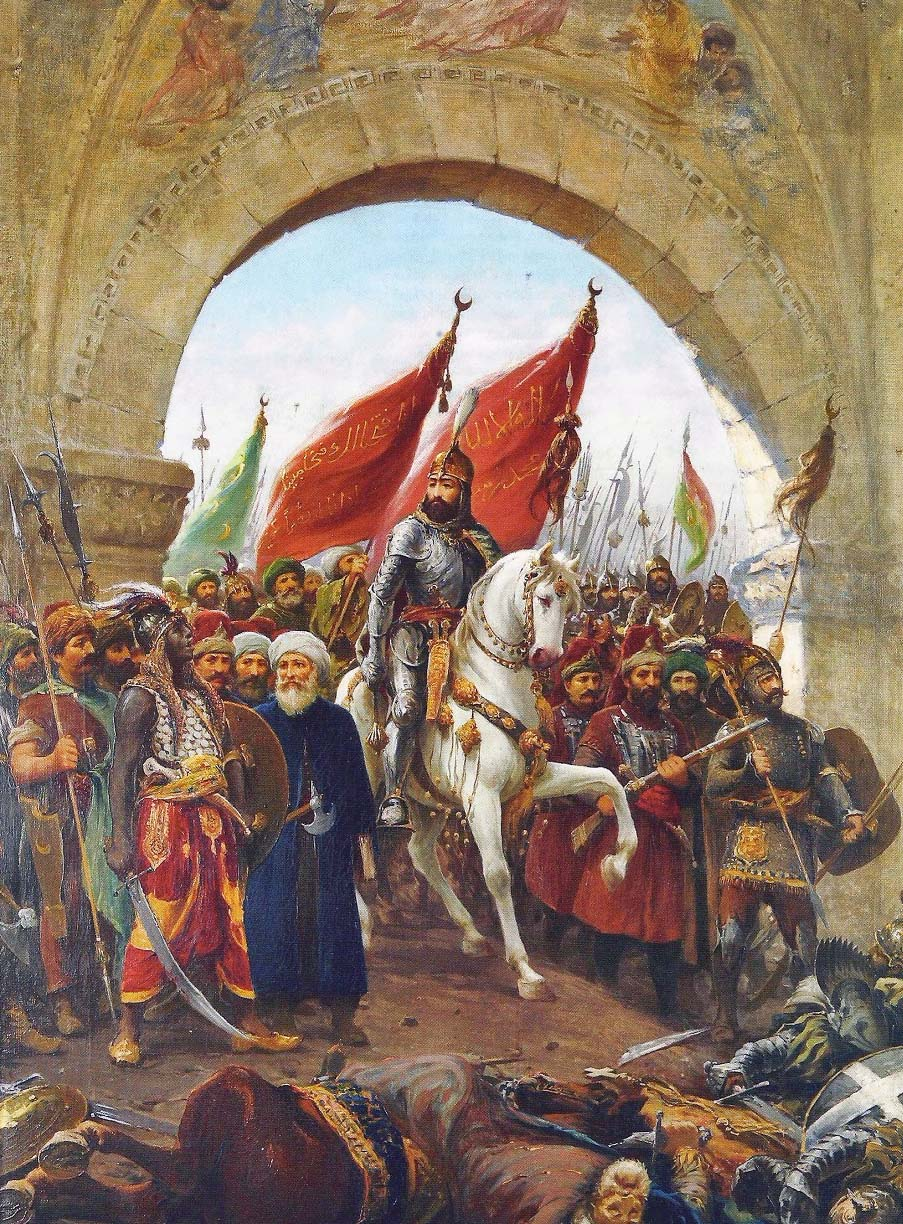
Sultan Mehmed II's entry into Constantinople

- Timur: Sunni Muslim Turco-Mongol conqueror who hailed from the Chagatai Khanate, went on to be an undefeated military commander, including a crushing defeat he inflicted on Bayezid I at the Battle of Ankara.
- Malik Ayaz: Gujarat Sultanate's naval admiral and governor of Sorath.

=== 15th century ===
- Oruç Reis (Ottoman Turkish: عروج ريس; Spanish: Aruj; c. 1474–1518) was an Ottoman seaman, who became bey (governor) of Algiers, beylerbey (chief governor) of the West Mediterranean, and admiral of the Ottoman Empire. The elder brother of the famous Ottoman admiral Hayreddin Barbarossa, he was born on the Ottoman island of Midilli (Lesbos in present-day Greece) and died in battle against the Spanish at Tlemcen in the Ottoman Eyalet of Algeria.
- Hayreddin Barbarossa (Arabic: خير الدين بربروس, romanized: Khayr al-Din Barbarus, original name Khiḍr; Turkish: Barbaros Hayrettin Paşa), also known as Hızır Hayrettin Pasha, and simply Hızır Reis (c. 1466/1478 – 4 July 1546), was an Ottoman corsair and later admiral of the Ottoman Navy.[1] Barbarossa's naval victories secured Ottoman dominance over the Mediterranean during the mid 16th century.
- Zahiruddin Babur: Conqueror of India and founder of the powerful Mughal Empire.
- Zain-ul-Abidin:Ruler of Kashmir, belonging to Shah Mir Dynasty, ruling from 1420-1470.He is also known as Bud shah.
- Shah Ismail I of Persia: the founder of the Safavid dynasty of Iran, ruling from 1501 to 23 May 1524 as shah (king).
- Selim I: Also known as "Yavuz Sultan Selim Khan", he was the sultan of the Ottoman Empire and Ottoman Caliph.On the eve of his death in 1520, the Ottoman Empire spanned about 3,400,000 km2 (1,300,000 sq mi), having grown by seventy percent during Selim's reign.
- Mehmed II: Also known as "Mehmed the Conqueror", he captured the Byzantine stronghold of Constantinople.
- Sharifa Fatima: A female Zaidi chieftain of Yemen, she conquered Sa'dah.
- Ahmad al-Mansur: was Sultan of the Saadi dynasty of Morocco that defeated the Songhai Empire.
- Abu Marwan Abd al-Malik I Saadi: was Sultan of the Saadi dynasty of Morocco that defeated the Portuguese army at the Battle of Alcácer Quibir.

=== 16th century ===
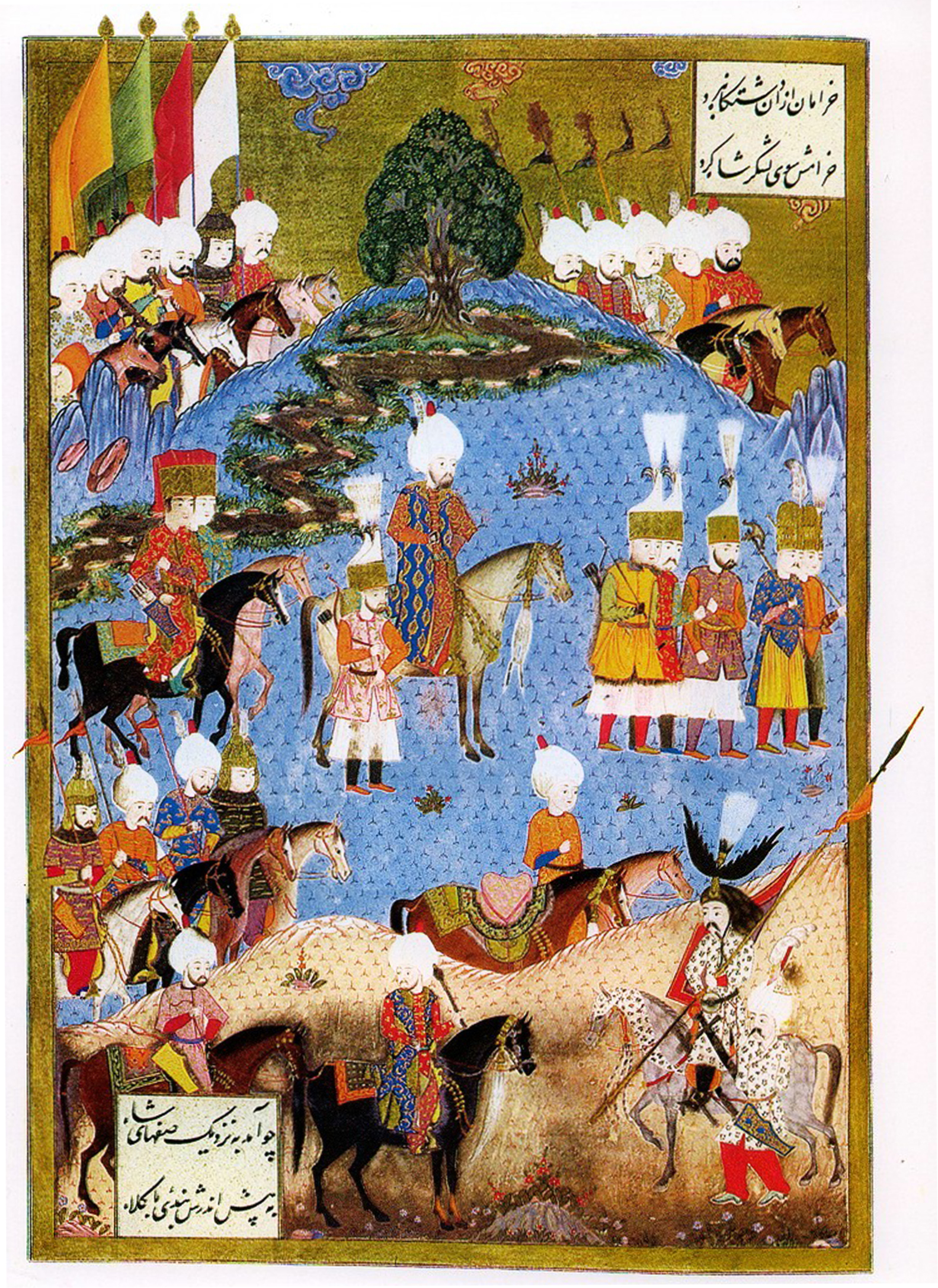
Suleiman with army

- Bairam Khan: The Regent and military leader of the Mughal Empire
- Dragut: also known as "The Drawn Sword of Islam", Ottoman Naval Commander, Beylerbey, and famed Corsair
- Humayun: Second Mughal emperor.
- Isa Khan Niazi: Commander of Sher Shah Suri.
- Malik Ambar: An Ethiopian slave who became a general and challenged the might of the Mughal army.
- Sayyed Mahmud Khan: A Commander–in– Chief of the Mughal Empire.
- Sher Shah Suri: Deposed the second Mughal Emperor, Humayun in the Mughal Interregnum and founded the short-lived Sur Dynasty.
- Suleiman the Magnificent: Suleiman I (Ottoman Turkish: سليمان اول, romanized: Süleyman-ı Evvel; Turkish: I. Süleyman; 6 November 1494 – 6 September 1566), commonly known as Suleiman the Magnificent in the West and Suleiman the Lawgiver (Ottoman Turkish: قانونى سلطان سليمان, romanized: Ḳānūnī Sulṭān Süleymān) in his realm, was the tenth and longest-reigning Sultan of the Ottoman Empire from 1520 until his death in 1566
- Tahmasp I: He ensured the survival of the Saffavids of Persia.
- Abbas I of Persia: was the 5th Safavid Shah (king) of Iran and is generally considered the strongest ruler of the Safavid dynasty.
- Sharif ibn Ali Founder of the Alaouite dynasty of Morocco.

=== 17th century ===
- Murad IV: Rejuvenated the Ottoman Empire with reforms and reconquered the city of Yerevan and Baghdad.
- Aurangzeb: Also known as Aurangzeb Alamgir, he was the 6th Mughal Emperor who expanded the Mughal Empire to its largest extent.
- Zulfiqar Khan Nusrat Jung: Son of a renowned nobleman of Emperor Aurangzeb. He held several appointments under Emperor Aurangzeb in the Mughal Empire.
- Mohammed ben Abdallah: Sultan of Morocco took part during Siege of Melilla (1774).
- Daud Khan Panni: He was a Mughal commander, Nawab of the Carnatic and later Viceroy of Deccan. The Emperor Aurangzeb appointed him as a leading commander of the Mughal Army in 1701, while Zulfikhar Ali Khan was the Nawab.

=== 18th century ===
- Nadir Shah 1688–1747: Also known as Nadir Qoli Beg and Tahmasp-Qoli Khan, he was Shah of Iran and a military leader.
- Ahmad Shah Durrani 1722–1772: He was the founder of the Durrani dynasty and is regarded as the founder of the modern state of Afghanistan. He is best known for his victory against the Maratha at the Battle of Panipat (1761).
- Muhammad IV of Morocco: Sultan of Morocco who took part in the 19th-century Hispano-Moroccan War.
- Hyder Ali 1722–1782
- Imam Shamil 1797–1871: An Avar (from modern-day Dagestan) who is considered both a political and religious leader for Chechens, Dagestanis, and Caucasians.
- Tipu Sultan 1750–1799): Better known as the Tiger of Mysore, Tipu was the ruler of the Kingdom of Mysore. He directed Mysorean military operations against rival Indian powers and the East India Company during the second half of the 18th century.
- Lalla Fatma N'Soumer An important figure in North African history who fought against the French.

=== 19th century ===
- Ahmadullah Shah 1787–1858: Led Indian rebel warriors in the Siege and Capture of Lucknow.
- Syed Ahmad Barelvi or Sayyid Ahmad Shaheed 1786–1831: was an Indian Sunni Muslim revivalist from Rae Bareli, a part of the historical United Provinces of Agra and Oudh. The epithet Barelvi is derived from Rae Bareli, his place of origin.
- Barkat Ahmad: Leading figure in the Indian Rebellion of 1857. Commander in chief of Battle of Chinhat where he led 6,000 rebels and attacked the British residency in Lucknow.
- Diponegoro 1785–1855: Javanese prince who opposed the Dutch colonial rule during the Java War of 1825–1830.
- Fazl-e-Haq Khairabadi 1797–1861: Leading figure in the Indian Rebellion of 1857.
- Abd al-Qādir al-Jazā'irī 1808–1883: An Algerian militant against the French occupation.
- Mir Masjidi Khan d.1841: An Afghan resistance leader during the First Anglo-Afghan War.
- Bakht Khan: Indian Muslim commander during the Indian Rebellion of 1857.
- Husein Gradaščević: Leader of the Great Bosnian uprising.
- Muhammad Ahmad 1844–1885: A Muslim religious leader and militant in Anglo-Egyptian Sudan.
- Omar Mukhtar 1858–1931: A Libyan leader of the resistance against the Italian occupation forces in Libya.
- Muhammad Ibn 'Abd al-Karim al-Khattabi 1882–1963: A Moroccan Berber leader, he fought against the French and Spanish occupations of Northern Morocco.
- Begum Hazrat Mahal: An Indian Queen who played a major role in the Indian Rebellion of 1857.
- Ma Zhan'ao 1830–1886: A general of the Qing dynasty.
- Ma Anliang 1855–1920: A general of the Qing dynasty and then of the Republic of China.
- Ma Guoliang: A general of the Qing dynasty.
- Ma Qianling 1824–1909: A general of the Qing dynasty.
- Ma Zhanshan 1885–1950: A general of the Republic of China.
- Ghazi Osman Pasha 1832–1900: An Ottoman field marshal and the hero of the Siege of Plevna.
- Abdul Hamid II 1842-1918: (Abdülhamid or Abdul Hamid II was the sultan of the Ottoman Empire from 31 August 1876 to 27 April 1909, and the last sultan to exert Effective control over the fracturing state. The time period which he reigned in the Ottoman Empire is known as the Hamidian Era. Time changed and finally on August 31, 1876, Prince Abdulhamid ascended the Ottoman throne with the title Sultan Abdul Hamid II. The cash he had earned from trade when he was a prince and the experiences he had gained, were significant. He was a smart, wise sultan with political genius).
- Fakhri Pasha 1868–1948: Commander of the Ottoman Empire army and governor of Medina from 1916 to 1919.
- Ibrahim Pasha of Egypt 1789–1848: Commander of the Egyptian army.
- Tuanku Imam Bonjol, leader of Padri movement and National Hero of Indonesia who fought against Dutch.
- Panglima Bandahala son of Sattiya Munuh son of Sayyid Qasim, trusted adviser and close relative of the Sultan Jamalul Kiram II, he held significant positions such as Municipal President and peace emissary

=== 20th century ===
- Abdulaziz al-Saud, also known as Ibn Saud, was the founder of Saudi Arabia, the third Saudi Empire. He was King of Saudi Arabia from 23 September 1932 to his death. He had ruled parts of the kingdom as early as 1902, having previously been Emir, Sultan, and King of Nejd and King of Hejaz. He was an Arab Military leader who followed Wahhabism He Conquered Kingdom of Hejaz in 1925.
- Faisal of Saudi Arabia (1905–1975): he was a Saudi Arabian statesman and diplomat who was King of Saudi Arabia from 2 November 1964 until his assassination in 1975.
- Ahmad Shah Massoud (1953–2001): also known as the National Hero of Afghanistan He was the conqueror of cold war in Afghanistan, guerrilla commander during the resistance against the Soviet occupation between 1979 and 1989).
- Alija Izetbegovic: (1925-2003) was a Bosnian politician;lawyer and Islamic philosopher.who became the 1st president of Bosnia and Herzegovina in 1992.he was a member of tripartiate presidency of Bosnia until his death.he bravely defended the Bosnian nation and Bosnian Muslims from Serb aggression during the civil war in Bosnia and brought peace and stability to Bosnia.
- Mullah Mohammad Omar (1960–2013): Founder of Taliban and First Emir (Supreme Leader) of Islamic Emirates of Afghanistan
- Hadji Kamlon, Tausug freedom fighter, Sunni Muslim, Ash'ari in Aqeeda, Shafi'i in Madh'hab
- Mat Salleh (Datu Muhammad Salleh), Sabah warrior from Inanam who led the Mat Salleh Rebellion until his death. He was a relative of Sattiya Munuh son of Sayyid Qasim, grandfather of Panglima Bandahala who was the right hand of Sultan Jamalul Kiram II.
- Tun Datu Mustapha (Tun Datu Mustapha bin Datu Harun), shared a common lineage with Sayyid Capt. Kalingalan "Apuh Inggal" Caluang, both tracing their ancestry back to the Sultans of Sulu. First Yang di-Pertua Negeri (Governor) of Sabah and third Chief Minister of Sabah.
- Daud Beureueh, Acehnese Indonesian who served as the military governor of Aceh (1947-1950) and leader of Darul Islam rebellion in Aceh.
- Zainal Mustafa, Indonesian Islamic Scholar and National Hero of Indonesia from Tasikmalaya who resisted Japanese occupation.
- Syam'un, Indonesian Islamic Scholar and Regent of Serang.
- Sayyid Captain Kalingalan "Apuh Inggal" Caluang, son of Caluang son of Panglima Bandahala son of Sattiya Munuh son of Sayyid Qasim, one of the Fighting 21 of Sulu. he was one of the founders of Ansar El Islam (Helpers of Islam) along with Domocao Alonto, Rashid Lucman, Salipada Pendatun, Hamid Kamlian, Udtog Matalam, and Atty. Macapantun Abbas Jr. Accordingly, "it is a mass movement for the preservation and development of Islam in the Philippines".
- Panglima Bandahala son of Sattiya Munuh, trusted adviser and close relative of the Sultan Jamalul Kiram II, he held significant positions such as Municipal President, peace emissary and was also entrusted with overseeing the Giba ceremony for the enthronement of a Sultan.
- Anwar Ibrahim, Malaysian 10th Prime Minister. Proposed a petition to expelled Israel from the UN.

== See also ==
- Rules of war in Islam
- Jihad
