= Ahmadullah Shah =

Leader of the Indian Rebellion of 1857 (1787–1858)

- Born: Sikandar Shah; 1787; Faizabad, Oudh State, Company Raj
- Died: 5 June 1858 (aged 70–71); Shahjahanpur, North-Western Provinces, Company Raj
- Other names: Moulvi, Danka Shah, Nakkar Shah
- Known for: Leadership in the Indian Rebellion of 1857
- Father: Ghulam Hussain Khan

Ahmadullah Shah (1787 – 5 June 1858) famous as the Maulvi of Faizabad, was a famous freedom fighter and leader of the Indian Rebellion of 1857. Maulavi Ahmadullah Shah was known as the lighthouse of the rebellion in the Awadh region. British officers like George Bruce Malleson and Thomas Seaton made mentions about the courage, valour, personal and organizational capabilities of Ahmadullah. G. B. Malleson mentions Ahmadullah repeatedly in the History of Indian Mutiny, a book written in 6 volumes covering Indian revolt of 1857. Thomas Seaton describes Ahmadullah Shah as:

A man of great abilities, of undaunted courage, of stern determination, and by far the best soldier among the rebels.

— Thomas Seaton,

Being a practicing Muslim, he was also an epitome of religious unity and Ganga-Jamuna culture of Faizabad. In the rebellion of 1857, royals like Nana Sahib and Khan Bahadur Khan fought alongside Ahmadullah.

The British could never catch the Maulvi alive. The price of 50,000 pieces of silver was announced to capture him. Finally the king of Powayan, Raja Jagannath Singh killed Maulvi, beheaded him and presented his head to the British for which Raja Jagannath was paid the announced prize. Next day, the head of the Maulvi was seen hanging at the kotwali.

== Family ==
The family of Ahmadullah was original inhabitant of Gopamau village in Hardoi district. His father Ghulam Hussain Khan was a military general in Sultan Hyder Ali's Mysore army. G. B. Malleson describes the personality of the Maulvi as follows:

The Moulvi was a remarkable person. His name was Ahmad-ullah and his native place was Faizabad in Oudh. In person, he was tall, lean and muscular, with large deep eyes, beetle brows, a high aquiline nose, and lantern jaws.

The Maulvi was a Sunni Muslim and belonged to an affluent family. He had a good command over English. After getting his traditional Islamic education, the Maulvi was trained in welfare as well. He travelled to England, Russia, Iran, Iraq, Mecca and Medina, and also performed Hajj.

== Before 1857 revolt ==
Maulvi Ahmadullah Shah believed that for the success of an armed rebellion, the co-operation of the people was very important. He travelled to Delhi, Meerut, Patna, Calcutta and several other places and sowed the seed of independence. Maulvi and Fazl-e-Haq Khairabadi also declared jihad against the Britons. He also authored a pamphlet called Fateh Islam, a planned manner for the need of jihad against the Britisher, even before the eruption of the revolt in 1857.

According to G. B. Malleson, "It is beyond doubt that behind the conspiracy of the 1857 revolt, the Moulavi's brain and efforts were significant. Distribution of bread during the campaigns, Chapati Movement, was actually his brainchild."

== Arrest at Patna ==
According to G. B. Malleson, when the Maulvi was in Patna, suddenly with no previous notice or intimation, an officer arrived at Patna from Punjab. He is referred as Lt. Thursbern in a book by Rashmi Kumari on Ahmadullah Shah. With a warrant in his pocket, he walked into Sadiqpur, a quarter in Patna. He entered the house of Ahmadullah Shah, and with the help of the police arrested him. The Maulvi was awarded capital punishment on the charges of revolt and conspiracy against the British rule. The punishment was later reduced to life imprisonment.

After the eruption of the revolt on 10 May 1857, rebel sepoys from Azamgarh, Banaras and Jaunpur arrived in Patna on 7 June. They attacked the bungalows of the English officers who were already on the run. Once the city was captured by the rebels, they captured the government treasury. They proceeded towards the jail and got the Maulvi and the other prisoners freed. After declaring Man Singh as the Raja of Patna, Maulvi Ahmadullah proceeded to Awadh.

== Indian Rebellion of 1857 and 1858 ==
The rebel army of Awadh was led by Barkat Ahmad and Maulvi Ahmadullah Shah. In the Battle of Chinhat, Barkat Ahmad was declared the Chief Army Officer of the rebels. The British army was led by Henry Montgomery Lawrence who eventually died at the Residency building. This fierce battle was won by the rebel army.

Ahmadullah Shah also led an attack on Beligarad. The writer Kaisar-ut-tawarikh states that it was a huge victory for the rebels.

Maulavi fought with great courage and chivalry in real sense, and for that he succeeded in pushing the British to Beligarad. And then a big house of "Machchhi Bhavan" was also blown up.

After Lucknow was captured by the rebels, Birjis Qadr, the ten-year-old son of Wajid Ali Shah and Begum Hazrat Mahal was declared the king. The Maulvi resisted being part of a new administration. He left the palace politics and established his camp with Ghamandi Singh and 1000 soldiers of Subedar Umrao Singh at Badshah Bagh across the Gomti River.

On 6 March 1858, British forces attacked Lucknow again under the leadership of Sir Colin Campbell, a reputed British army official. The rebel army was led by Begum Hazrat Mahal. With the capture of Lucknow by the British, the rebels escaped on 15 and 16 March through a road leading to Faizabad. The last rebels, 1,200 men under Ahmadullah Shah were driven from a fortified house in the centre of the city on 21 March. The city was declared cleared on this date.

After the fall of Lucknow, the Maulvi shifted his base to Shahjahanpur in Rohilkhand. In Shahjahanpur the forces of Nana Sahib and Khan Bahadur Khan joined the Maulvi in attacking the Britishers.

Colin Campbell departed from Shahjahanpur on 2 May towards Bareilly. The Maulvi, with the King of Mohammadi and several thousand soldiers attacked Shahjahanpur. The British Army was informed and General Brigadier John reached Shahjahanpur on 11 May. Jones could not muster the courage to attack the Maulvi and kept waiting for reinforcements from Bareilly. George Bruce Malleson writes that:

Maulavi was the only one who could have dared to defeat Sir Colin Campbell twice.

The fierce battle took place on 15 May 1858 between a platoon of the rebels and the regiment of General Brigadier Jones. Both sides had to bear heavy losses but the rebels still managed to capture Shahjahanpur. Colin reached Shahjahanpur on 20 May, and attacked it from all sides. This battle continued all night long. Maulavi and Nana Sahib left Shahjahanpur. It is said that Colin himself followed Maulvi but couldn't capture him. After the fall of Shahjahanpur, the Maulvi left for Powayan which was 18 miles to the north of Shahjahanpur.

== Death ==
The British could never catch the Maulvi alive. They announced 50,000 pieces of silver as a prize to capture the Maulvi. Maulvi Ahmadullah Shah wanted to induce the king of Powayan, Raja Jagannath Singh to revolt against Britishers, but the latter did not give into the Maulvi's wishes. When the Maulvi reached gates of his palace on his war elephant, the king attacked him by firing a cannon shot. This killed the Maulvi who came down falling from his elephant. G. B. Malleson describes his death as:

Thus died the Maulvi Ahmadullah Shah of Faizabad. If a patriot is a man who plots and fights for independence, wrongfully destroyed, for his native country, then most certainly, the Moulvee was a true patriot.

— G. B. Malleson

The brother of Raja Jagannath Singh the king of Powayan, Kunwar Baldeo Singh is known to have killed Maulvi Ahmadullah Shah, beheaded him and presented it to the magistrate. He was paid the announced prize and gained the favour of the British. The head of the Maulvi was hanged at Kotwali the next day. Another revolutionary of 1857, Fazl-e-Haq Khairabadi witnessed the death of the Maulvi.

== Legacy ==
The to-be-constructed mosque in Ayodhya as per the verdict of the Supreme Court of India in the Babri Masjid demolition case, will be named after Ahmadullah Shah.

== See also ==
- Indian independence movement
- Fazl-e-Haq Khairabadi
- Barkat Ahmad
- Bakht Khan
- Begum Hazrat Mahal
- Khan Bahadur Khan Rohilla
- Shah Waliullah Dehlawi
- Nana Sahib
- Siege of Lucknow
- Battle of Chinhat
- Capture of Lucknow
- Indian Rebellion of 1857
