= Indian Mutiny Medal =

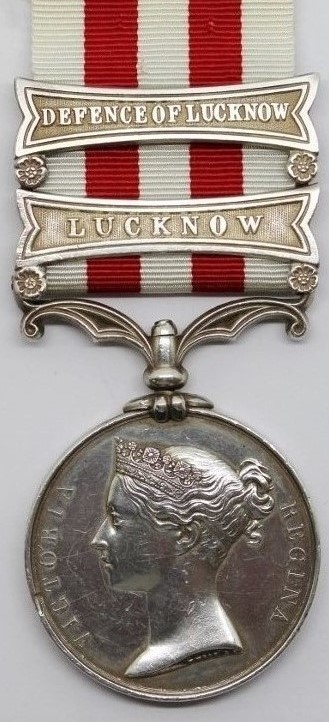
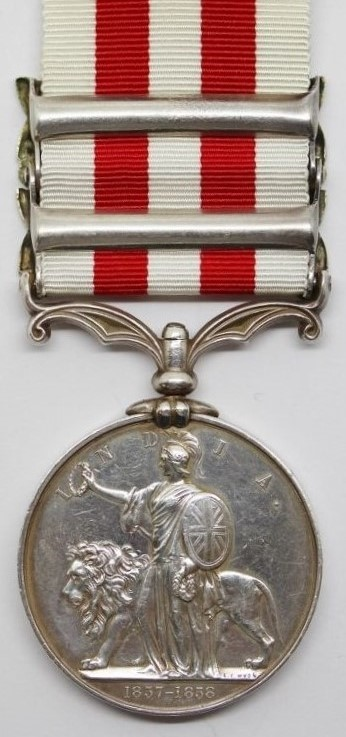
- Obverse and reverse of the medal
- Type: Campaign medal
- Awarded for: Campaign service.
- Description: Silver disk, 36mm diameter.
- Presented by: United Kingdom of Great Britain and Ireland
- Eligibility: British and Indian forces.
- Campaign(s): Indian Mutiny 1857–58.
- Clasps: Delhi; Defence of Lucknow; Relief of Lucknow; Lucknow; Central India
- Established: 1858
- Total: 290,000
- Ribbon: White with two red stripes.

The Indian Mutiny Medal was a campaign medal approved in August 1858, for officers and men of British and Indian units who served in operations in suppression of the Indian Rebellion of 1857.

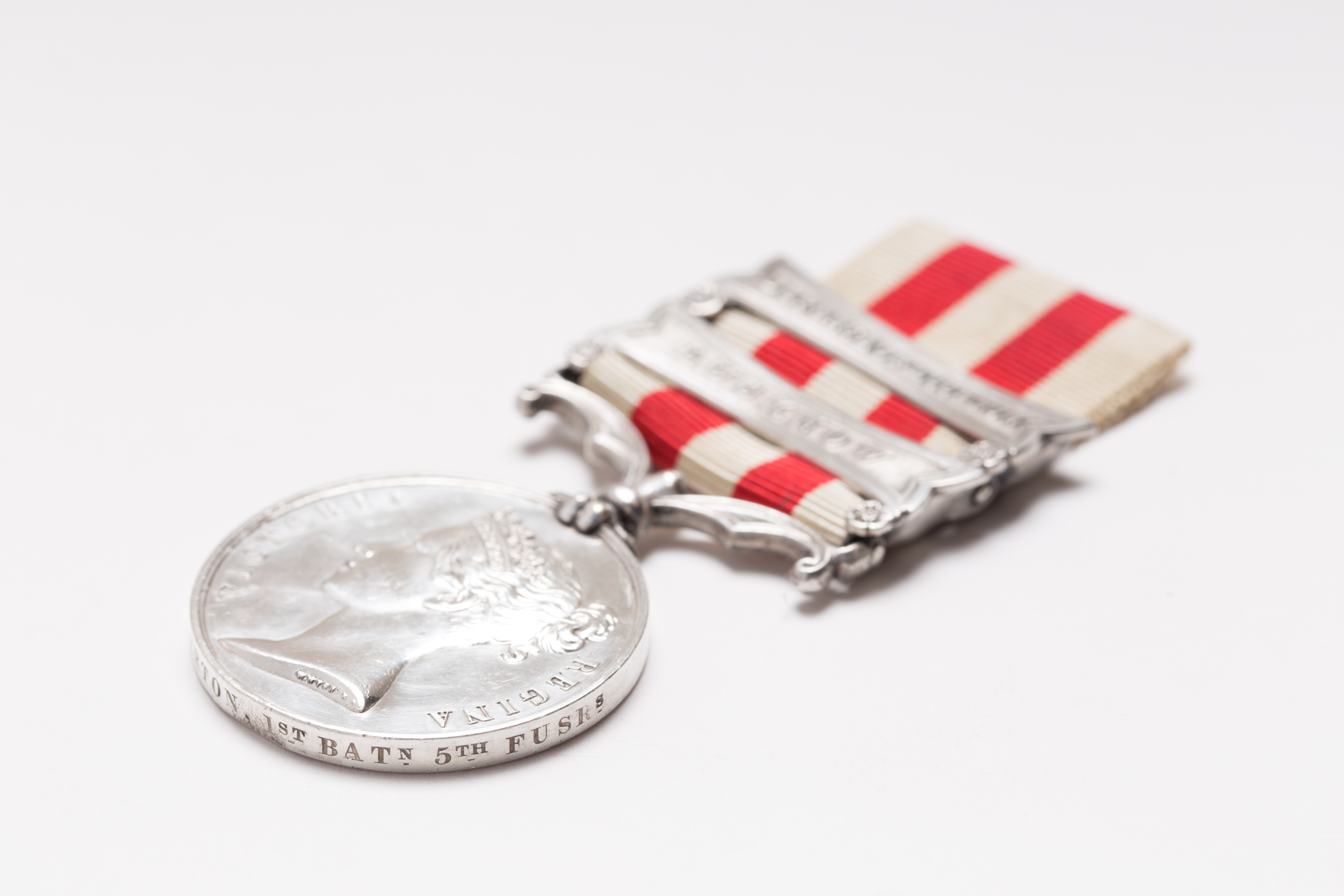
Medal with edge inscription, awarded to Corporal D Alderton, 5th (Northumberland) Fusiliers

The medal was initially sanctioned for award to troops who had been engaged in action against the mutineers. However, in 1868 the award was extended to all those who had borne arms or who had been under fire, including such people as members of the Indian judiciary and the Indian civil service, who were caught up in the fighting. Some 290,000 medals were awarded. In 1862, the 95th (Derbyshire) Regiment of Foot's mascot, Private Derby, received the Indian Mutiny Medal at Poona.

The obverse depicts the diademed head of a young Queen Victoria with the legend VICTORIA REGINA, designed by William Wyon. The reverse shows a helmeted Britannia holding a wreath in her right hand and a union shield on her left arm. She is standing in front of a lion. Above is the word INDIA, with the dates 1857–1858 below. The reverse was designed by Leonard Charles Wyon, who also engraved the die of the medal.

The 1.25 inches (32 mm) wide ribbon is white with two scarlet stripes, with each stripe of equal width. The recipient's name and unit is impressed on the rim of the medal in block Roman capitals.

== Clasps ==
Five clasps were authorised, though the maximum awarded to any one man was four. The clasps read downwards from the top of the medal.

- Delhi

30 May – 14 September 1857. Awarded to troops participating in the recapture of Delhi.

- Defence of Lucknow

29 June – 22 November 1857. Awarded to original defenders of Lucknow, including the masters and boys of La Martinière College in Lucknow who escaped to the Residency and assisted in its defence, and to the first relief force commanded by Sir Henry Havelock.

- Relief of Lucknow

November 1857. Awarded to the second Lucknow relief force under the command of Sir Colin Campbell.

- Lucknow

November 1857 – March 1858. Awarded to troops under command of Sir Colin Campbell who were engaged in final operations leading to the surrender of Lucknow and the clearing of the surrounding areas.

- Central India

January – June 1858. Awarded for service during the Central Indian campaign, including to those who served under Major-General Sir Hugh Rose in actions against Jhansi, Kalpi, and Gwalior. Also to those who served with Major-General Roberts in the Rajputana Field Force and Major-General Whitlock of the Madras Column.

The medal was issued without a clasp to those who served, but were not present during these major operations. The majority of these awards were made as a result of the 1868 extension of eligibility.

== Bibliography ==
- Mussell, John, ed. (2014). The Medal Yearbook 2015. Devon, UK: Token Publishing Ltd. ISBN 9781908828163.
- Joslin, Litherland and Simpkin. (1988). British Battles and Medals. London: Spink. ISBN 0907605257.
