= Barkat Ahmad =

Indian religious leader

- Born: Sayyad Barkat Ahmad Risaldar
- Known for: Battle of Chinhat, Figure of Indian Rebellion of 1857

Battle of Chinhat
- Part of Indian Rebellion of 1857
Date	June 30, 1857
Location	Ismailganj, near Lucknow, India
Result	Rebel victory

Belligerents
East India Company	Rebels

Commanders and leaders
Sir Henry Lawrence; Col. John Inglis (32nd)	Barkat Ahmad; Khan Ali Khan

Strength
approx. 700; Infantry: 32nd Regiment of Foot - 300; 13th, 48th, 71st Bengal Native Infantry - 230; Cavalry: Volunteer cavalry - 40; Detachments of 1st, 2nd, 3rd Oude Irregular Cavalry - 120; Artillery: Horse Light Field Battery - 4 guns; No 2 Oude Field Battery - 4 guns; One 8 inch howitzer	approx. 7,000; Infantry: approx. 6,000: 22nd Bengal Native Infantry.; 2nd, 3rd, 5th, 6th, 8th, 9th Oude Irregular Infantry.; 1st, 2nd Regiments Military Police.; Local Police Detachment - 300; Oude talookdars from Ramnugger Dhumeyree and Mahonah; Levied Infantry; Cavalry approx. 800: 15th Bengal Irregular Cavalry; 1st, 2nd & 3rd Oude Irregular Cavalry; Artillery: 16 guns: 5th, 7th, 13th Bty. Bengal Artillery; 1st Bty. Light Field, Oude Irregular Artillery

Casualties and losses
Dead: Col. William Case, CPT. Stephens, Lt. Brackenbury, Thomson (32nd), 112 NCOs and Men. Wounded: Campbell (71st), James (Commissariat); Losses: 2 Howitzer, 1 9-Pounder	589

Barkat Ahmad (1787 – 5 June 1858) was a sepoy mutineer and leading figure of the Indian Rebellion of 1857. Barkat Ahmad led the army of Indian rebels in the Battle of Chinhat, in Awadh region. Barkat Ahmad was a highly trained British sepoy. He led the rebels against the British officer Sir Henry Lawrence who was then located at the Residency.

== Battle of Chinhat ==
On 30 June 1857, Sir Henry received information of the movement of rebels and plan of attacking Lucknow. Sir Henry was so confident to ambush the rebel, he led the army and came out of the Residency on a buggy. The British army was composed of 300 British soldiers, 200 Indian soldiers, 200 cavalry and 13 cannons. Barkat Ahmad had anticipated this move of Britishers, hence planned for the attack near the village of Chinhat, twelve miles from Lucknow.

Barkat Ahmad led the rebel army of 5000 soldiers. He also had Ahmadullah Shah as a commander under him. A fierce battle took place at Chinhat in which Britishers retreated and were pushed backed to the Residency. Lawrence was wounded by an exploding shell on 2 July and died two days later. Barkat Ahmad is a forgotten hero in the Indian history

== See also ==
- Indian independence movement
- Fazl-e-Haq Khairabadi
- Bakht Khan
- Begum Hazrat Mahal
- Siege of Lucknow
- Capture of Lucknow
