= John Banks (East India Company officer) =

John Sherbrooke Banks (1811–1857) was a British major who was killed in the Siege of Lucknow.

Banks was in 1828 nominated to a cadetship in the Bengal army by the Right Honourable Charles Wynn, at that time president of the Board of Control. Arriving in India in 1829, he was posted to the 33rd regiment Bengal Native Infantry, of which he became quartermaster and interpreter in 1833. He was subsequently employed for some time on civil duties in the Saugor and Nerbudda territory. In 1842 he served with General Pollock's army of retribution in the march upon Kabul, and shortly afterwards was appointed to a subordinate office in the military secretariat. In this office some years later he was brought into contact with the governor-general, the Marquis of Dalhousie, whose confidence and personal regard he speedily acquired. Owing to the absence of the head of the department on sick leave, it devolved upon Major (then Captain) Banks to make all the arrangements for the expedition which resulted in the conquest and annexation of Pegu. Shortly after the close of the war, he accompanied Lord Dalhousie on a visit to British Burma, and subsequently became a member of the governor-general's personal staff in the capacity of military secretary. In July 1855 he was deputed upon a confidential mission to Lucknow, to communicate to Sir James Outram, the resident, the intentions of the governor-general regarding the annexation of Oudh.

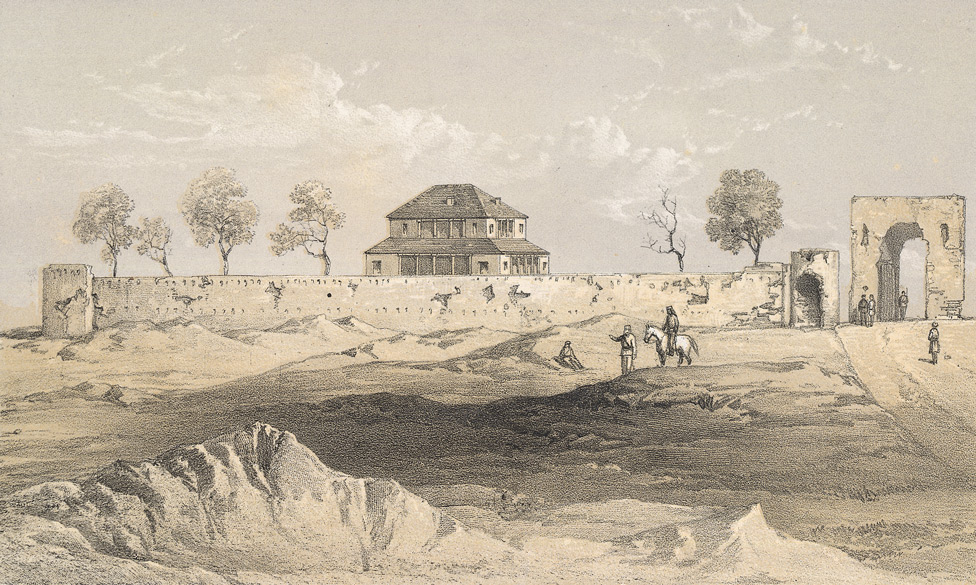
Banks' House in Lucknow, in 1857

When Lord Dalhousie left India, Major Banks joined the Oudh commission as commissioner of Lucknow, and soon became the trusted adviser and friend of the chief commissioner, Sir Henry Lawrence, by whom, on his death-bed, he was nominated to succeed as chief commissioner, but he survived his chief only a few weeks. In Sir John Inglis's memorable despatch on the defence of the Lucknow residency, the death of Major Banks was noticed in the following terms:—'The garrison had scarcely recovered the shock which it had sustained in the loss of its revered and beloved general, when it had to mourn the death of that able and respected officer, Major Banks, who received a bullet through his head while examining a critical outpost on 21 July, and died without a groan.'

Major Banks was a man of excellent judgement and tact, able and industrious in the discharge of his official duties, a brave soldier, and an excellent linguist. His widow, a daughter of Major-general R. B. Fearon, C.B., received a special pension from the India Office in recognition of her husband's services.

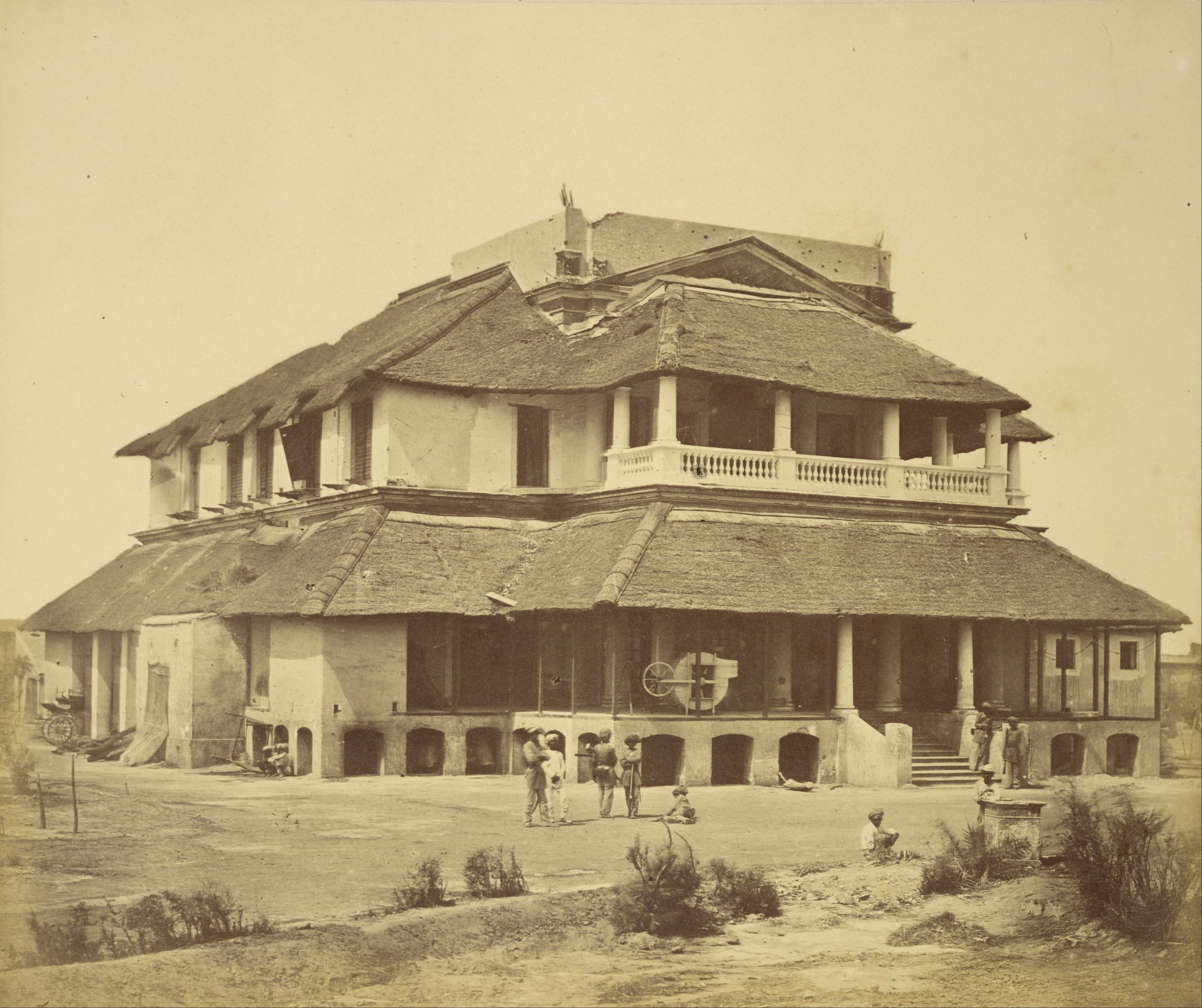
The house in 1858, photographed by Felice Beato
