= Bahadur Khan Rohilla =

Regent of the Kingdom of Rohilkhand from 1749 to 1774

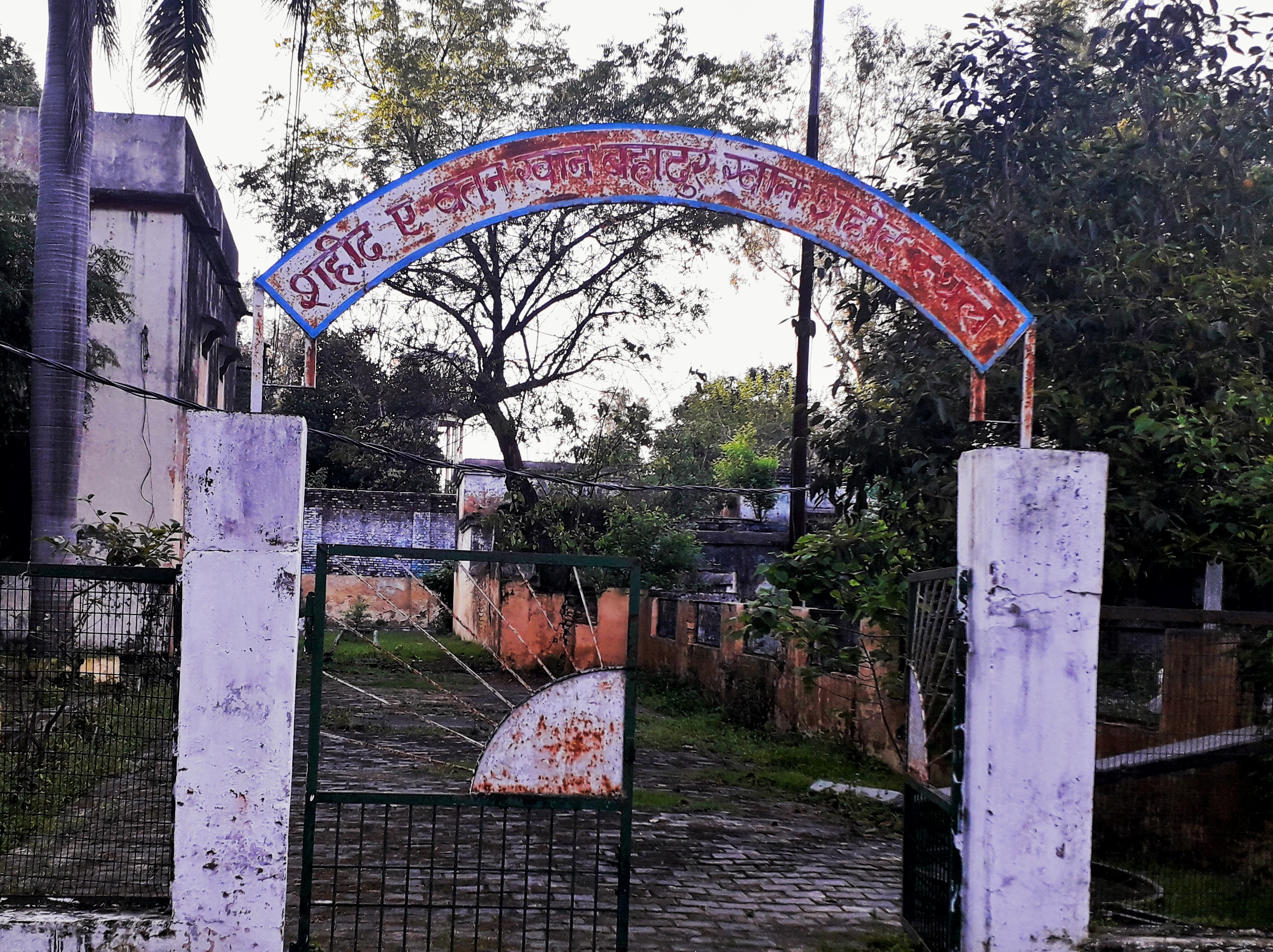
A memorial dedicated to Khan Bahadur Khan at the District Jail in Bareilly

Khan Bahadur Khan Rohilla (1823 – 24 February 1860) was the grandson of Hafiz Rahmat Khan, the Regent of the Kingdom of Rohilkhand from 1749 to 1774. Bahadur Khan formed a government in Bareilly during the Indian Rebellion of 1857.

Ultimately, Bareilly was captured by the British. Bahadur Khan escaped to the Kingdom of Nepal, where the Nepalese army captured him and turned him over to the British. Bahadur Khan was tried, sentenced to death, and hanged in the Kotwali Police Station on 24 February 1860.
