= Battle of Chinhat =

Part of the Indian Rebellion of 1857

- Part of Indian Rebellion of 1857
Date	30 June 1857
Location	Ismailganj, near Lucknow, India
Result	Rebel victory

Belligerents
East India Company	Rebels

Commanders and leaders
Henry Lawrence; Col. John Inglis (32nd)	Barkat Ahmad; Khan Ali Khan

Strength
Approx. 700; Infantry: 32nd Regiment of Foot - 300; 13th, 48th, 71st Bengal Native Infantry - 230; Cavalry: Volunteer cavalry - 40; Detachments of 1st, 2nd, 3rd Oude Irregular Cavalry - 120; Artillery: Horse Light Field Battery - 4 guns; No 2 Oude Field Battery - 4 guns; One 8 inch howitzer	Approx. 7,000; Infantry: approx. 6,000: 22nd Bengal Native Infantry.; 2nd, 3rd, 5th, 6th, 8th, 9th Oude Irregular Infantry.; 1st, 2nd Regiments Military Police.; Local Police Detachment - 300; Oude talookdars from Ramnugger Dhumeyree and Mahonah; Levied Infantry; Cavalry approx. 800: 15th Bengal Irregular Cavalry; 1st, 2nd & 3rd Oude Irregular Cavalry; Artillery: 16 guns: 5th, 7th, 13th Bty. Bengal Artillery; 1st Bty. Light Field, Oude Irregular Artillery

Casualties and losses
Dead: Col. William Case, CPT. Stephens, Lt. Brackenbury, Thomson (32nd), 112 NCOs and Men. Wounded: Campbell (71st), James (Commissariat); Losses: 2 Howitzer, 1 9-Pounder	589

The Battle of Chinhat was fought on the morning of 30 June 1857, between British forces and Indian rebels, at Ismailganj, near Chinhat (or Chinhut), Oude (Awad/Oudh). The British were led by The Chief Commissioner of Oude, Sir Henry Lawrence. The insurgent force, which consisted of mutineers from the East India Company's army and retainers of local landowners, was led by Barkat Ahmad, a mutineer officer of the Company's army.

== Opening moves ==
Conflicting intelligence reports had indicated the approach of a small insurgent force towards Lucknow. Sir Henry, who was in bad health, under pressure from subordinates and whose fighting days were well behind him, ordered a force consisting of three companies of the 32nd Regiment of Foot (later the Duke of Cornwall's Light Infantry), several companies of the 13th Native Infantry and detachments of other regiments, a small force of Sikh cavalry and European volunteer cavalry as well as Bengal Artillery (Europeans) and Native Artillery, to proceed up the Faizabad road with the intention of intercepting what he believed to be an opponent several hundred strong.

== The battle ==
On approaching Ismailganj, Lawrences's force was suddenly fired on by the insurgents, who greatly outnumbered the British, by about 600 to 6,000. The rebels were in well prepared positions, behind stone walls and in the village, and soon inflicted heavy casualties on Lawrence's force, especially the 32nd Foot. The regiment's acting commanding officer, Lieutenant Colonel William Case, was killed, as were several officers. The 13th Native Infantry were slightly more successful in attacking to the right of the village, but the rebels were well entrenched and well led. To the latter fact may be attributed one of the few major victories which rebel forces obtained in open combat with the British, during the whole of the 'Mutiny'.

At a crucial moment, many of Lawrence's soldiers, especially Indian artillerymen, betrayed him by going over to the other side, overturning their guns and cutting the traces on the horses and the Sikh cavalrymen fled. As the British retreated towards the bridge over the Kukrail stream, the only access they had to Lucknow, an outflanking movement by the rebel cavalry threatened to cut them off. A charge by the 36 volunteer cavalrymen, consisting partly of civilians, threw the rebel cavalry into confusion and a significant part of the force was able to cross the bridge and retreat towards Lucknow. Lawrence ordered a battery of European artillery to occupy the bridgehead, with the intention of dissuading his enemy from following him. The artillery had no ammunition left, but achieved their aim of giving the retreating force a breathing space.

== The retreat ==
On the retreat, feats of great courage were performed by those who helped wounded and exhausted men to escape. Prominent among the rescuers were the native troops of the 13th NI, who often abandoned their own wounded in order to help British soldiers. An officer of the 13th NI, then Lieut. William George Cubitt, would be awarded the Victoria Cross for helping save three men of the 32nd Foot.

Seeing that the retreat would be generally successful, Lawrence left the force in order to organize the defence of the Lucknow residency. Brigadier John Inglis, commanding officer of the 32nd, who had opposed the 'adventure', was left to bring the survivors in. As a last attempt to break the momentum of the rebel pursuit, Lawrence ordered one company of the 32nd, which had not been at Chinhat, to hold the final bridge before Lucknow, over the Gumti river. The success of this company, under Lieut. John Edmondstone, and its orderly retreat under enemy pressure, probably helped save many lives.

By about 11:30 a.m, the retreat had been successfully completed. The British Residency at Lucknow, to which Lawrence withdrew, was then the scene of the Siege of Lucknow until November 1857.
