= The Residency, Lucknow =

British Residency
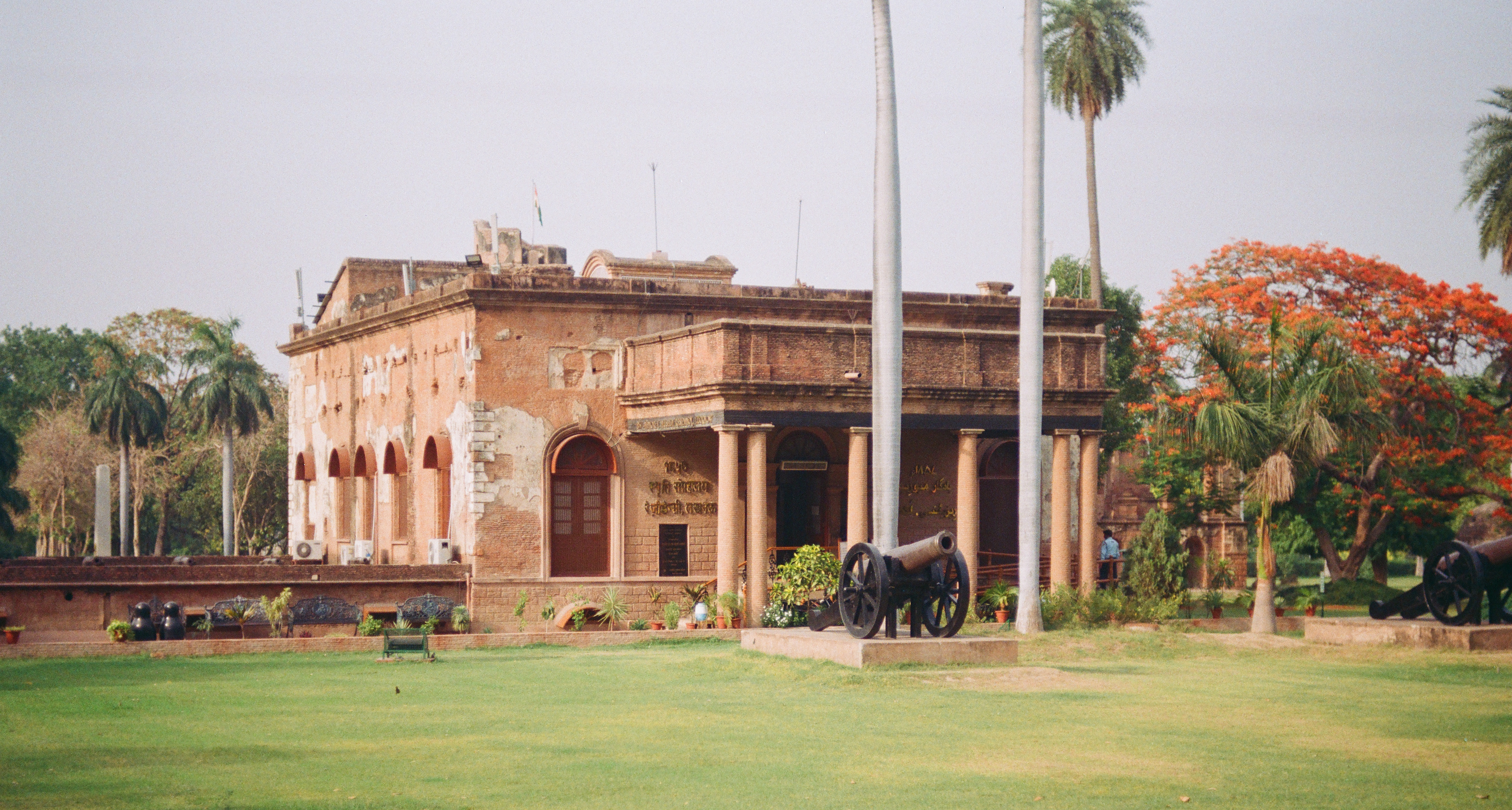

General information
- Location: Lucknow, Uttar Pradesh
- Coordinates: 26.8618°N 80.9257°E
- Groundbreaking: 1780
- Completed: 1800

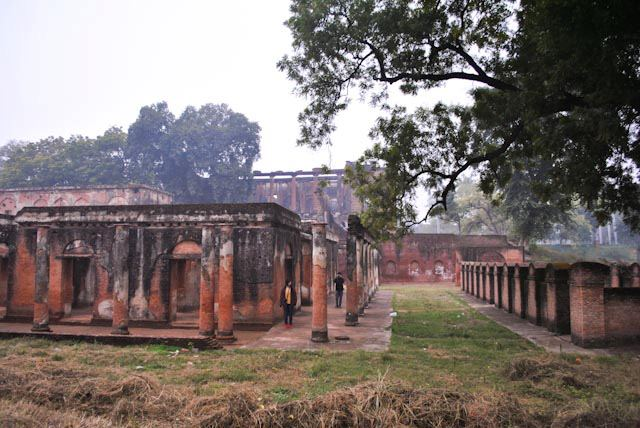
The Residency, Lucknow, in the foreground is the Treasury building, far left behind it the Martinière post. The Banquet Hall in the middle at the back.

The Residency, also called as the British Residency and Residency Complex, is a group of several buildings in a common precinct in the city of Lucknow, Uttar Pradesh, India. It served as the residence for the British Resident General who was a representative in the court of the Nawab of Awadh or Oudh. The Residency of Lucknow, one of the Residencies of British India, is located in the heart of the city, in the vicinity of other monuments like Shaheed Smarak, Tehri Kothi and the High Court Building.

== History ==
In 1775 Asaf-ud-Daula (the third nawab of Oudh) moved the capital from Faizabad to Lucknow. The Residency was constructed between 1780 and 1800. Construction started during the rule of Asaf-ud-Daula and ended during the rule of Saadat Ali Khan II, who was the fifth Nawab of Oudh.

Between 1 July 1857 and 17 November 1857, the Residency was subject to the Siege of Lucknow, part of the Indian Rebellion of 1857. Lucknow was recaptured by the East India Company in March 1858. The Residency suffered extensive damage during the fighting, and has been in ruins ever since.

== Architecture ==
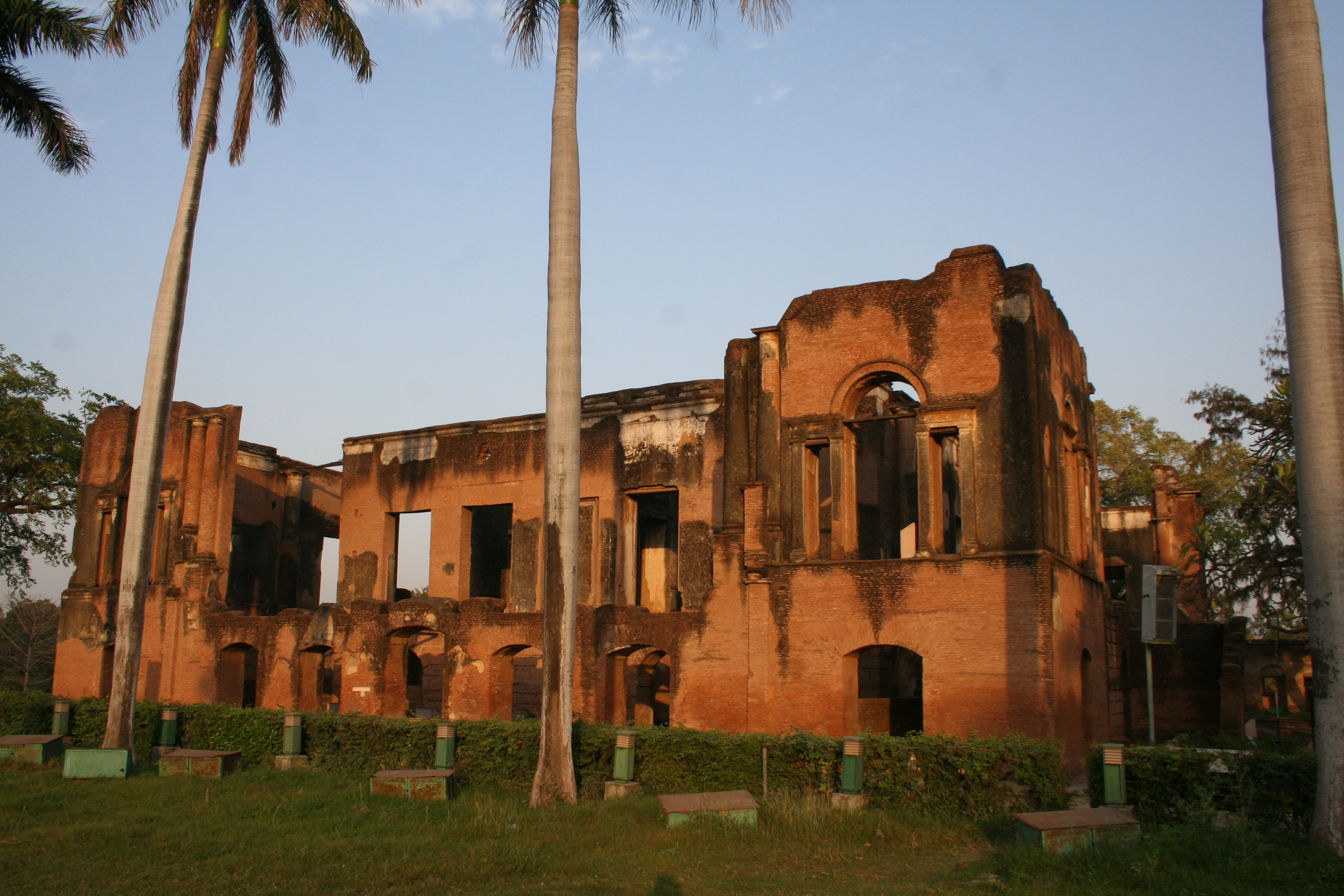
Banqet hall Residency

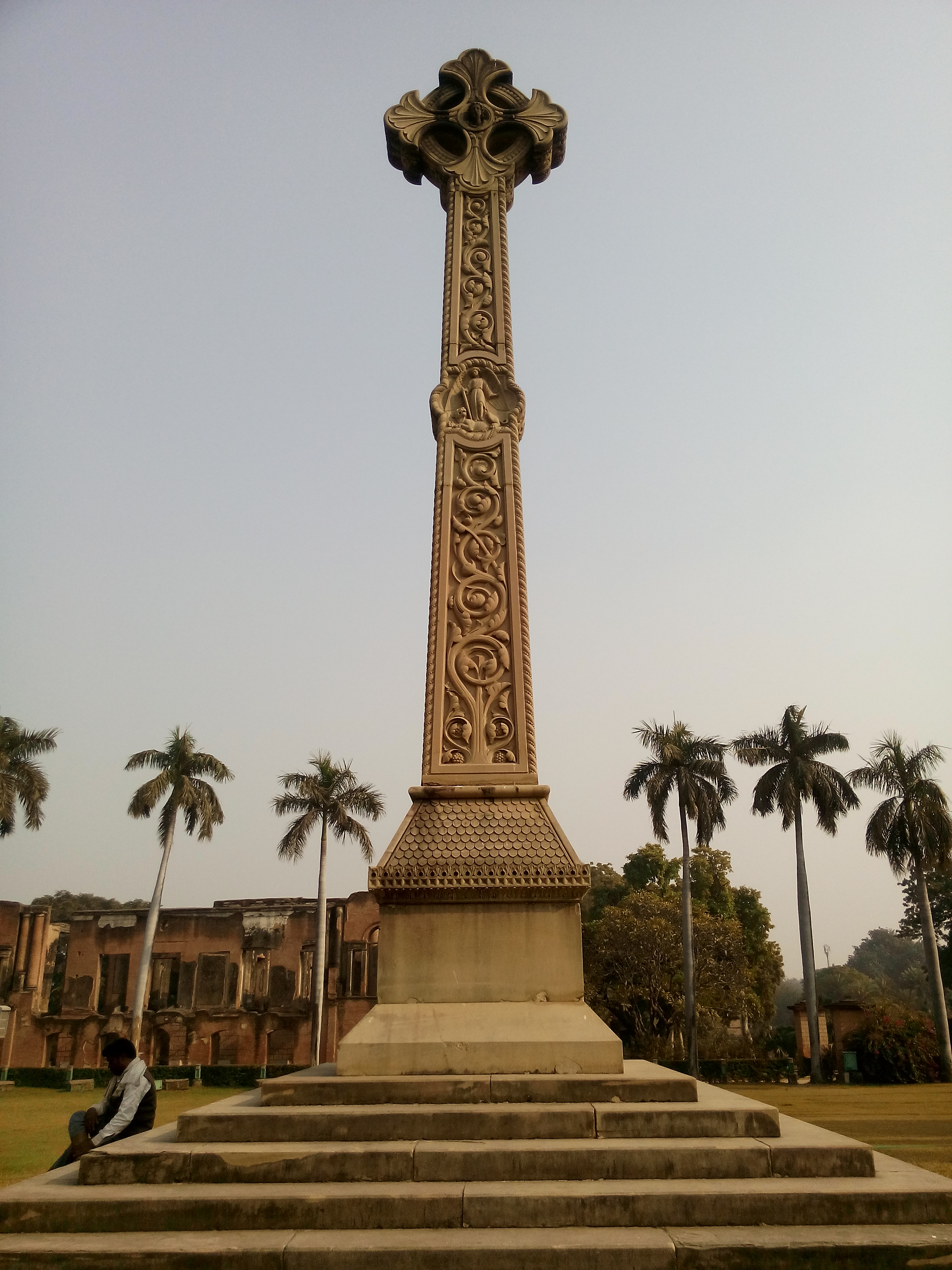
High cross Sir Henry Lawrence Memorial

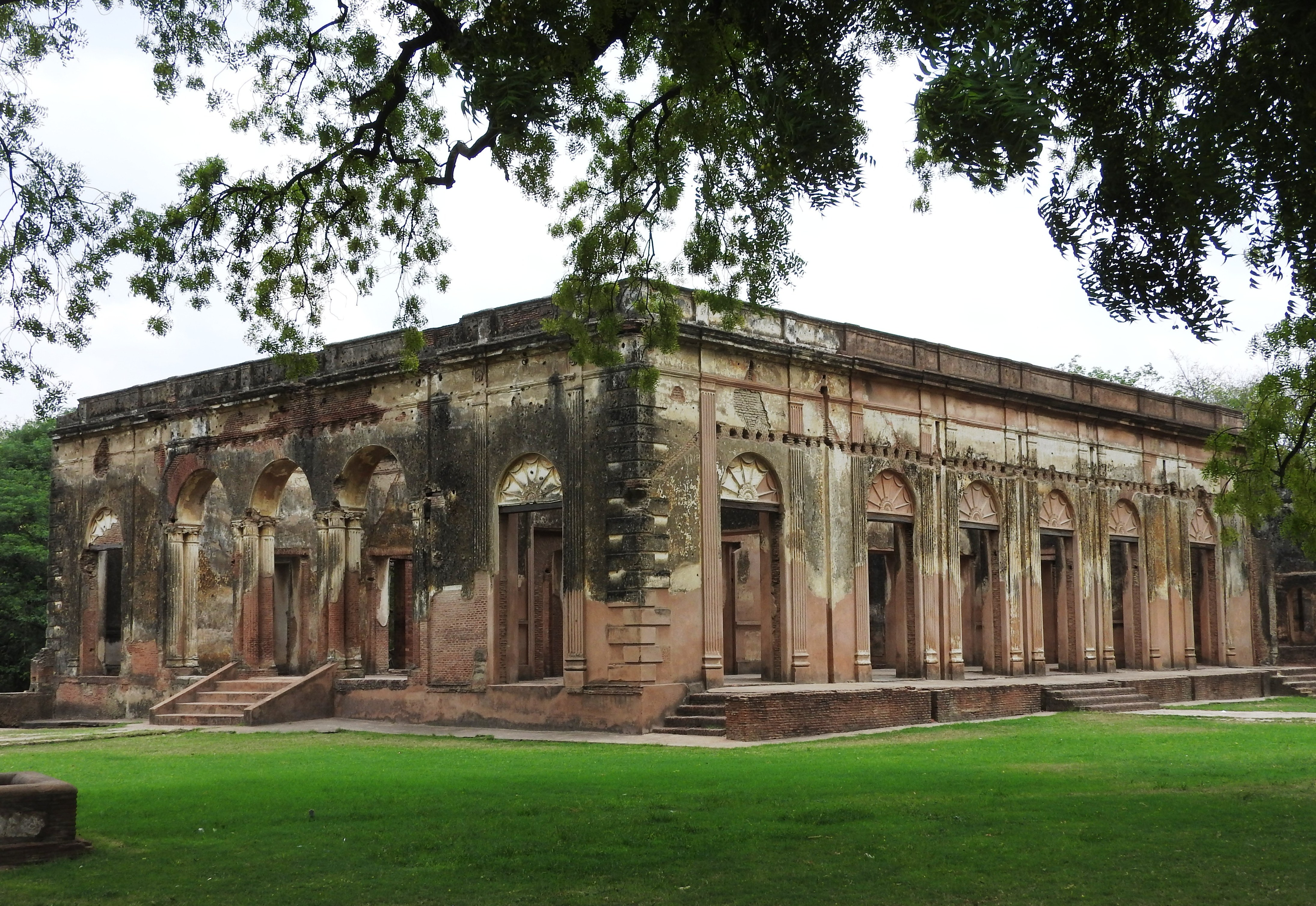
The Ruins of the British Residency

The Residency has been maintained as it was at the time of the final relief during the Siege of Lucknow, and the shattered walls are still scarred by cannon shot. Ever since Indian Independence, little has changed. The ruined building is now surrounded by lawns and flowerbeds and serves as a tourist attraction. The cemetery at the nearby ruined church has the graves of 2,000 men, women and children, including that of Sir Henry Montgomery Lawrence who died during the siege. There is a weathered epitaph near the grave of Sir Henry that reads "Here lies the son of Empire who tried to do his duty" while another nearby grave reads "Do not weep my children, for I am not dead, but am sleeping here." A light and sound show to display the history of the Residency is also played each evening.
