= Mahal family =

Family of three that claimed to be descendants of the Oudh State

Polaroids of Wilayat, son Cyrus and daughter Sakina

The Mahal family is a family that was headed by the matriarch Begum Wilayat Mahal who claimed to be descended from the rulers of the Oudh State in the 1970s; they thus proclaimed themselves as the royal family of Oudh. Members of the family who moved to Delhi lived in Malcha Mahal, a hunting lodge that dates back to the 14th century. The family's claim was disputed by many others, and on 22 November 2019, journalist Ellen Barry published an article in The New York Times claiming that the family had no royal connection and was in fact descended from the former Registrar of the University of Lucknow, Inayatullah Butt. (Note: The family name was probably 'Bhat', as recounted by Jawaharlal Nehru while describing Wilayat as "a Kashmiri woman by the name of Bhat who did a lot of mischief," in reference to her political activism in Pakistan.)

== Background ==
The Oudh State was a princely state, with a population of around five million people, in the Awadh region of North India until annexation by the British in 1856. The British seized the throne from the Royal House of Oudh, removing Nawab Ramzan Ali and forcing him to spend the rest of his life in Nepal in exile. He died in 1893, of poisoning. In 1981, The New York Times wrote that the British "never justified their seizure of Oudh legally."

There exist legitimate descendants of the Wazid Ali Shah, who have always maintained that this family's claim is bogus. The son of Wajid Ali Shah was Birjis Qadr, who had married Mehtab Ara, a granddaughter of Bahadur Shah Zafar, and had two sons Khurshid Qadr and Meher Quder. Meher Quder's three sons are Anjum Quder of Calcutta, Kaukub Quder of Aligarh and Nayyer Quder, a barrister in London. Anjum Quder had protested the claim of Wilayat Mahal in 1975.

== Claim ==
In an interview in 1985, Begum Wilayat Mahal told the Chicago Tribune that Zamrud Mahal, her grandmother, had been a direct descendant of Wazid Ali Shah. Zamrud reportedly appeared before Edward VIII when he visited Delhi in 1911 and informed him that she refused to accept a stipend from the British, which had been offered in return for their inheritance. Wilayat went on to state that in 1947, the first prime minister of an independent India, Jawaharlal Nehru, granted the family an ancestral palace in Srinagar, Kashmir. The family moved from Nepal and lived in the palace until it burned down in 1971.

== History ==
During the colonial period in India, Wilayat Malik became the second wife of Inayatullah Bhat, with both Inayatullah Bhat and Wilayat Malik being of Kashmiri origin. The young couple moved from Lahore to Lucknow, where Inayatullah Bhat worked as the assistant registrar at the University of Lucknow, later being promoted to the registrar. The Mahal family was headed by the matriarch Begum Wilayat Mahal, who had five children, including Zahid, Khalid, Shahid, Tariq (Assad), Mickey (Ali "Cyrus" Raza), and Farhad (Sakina). During the partition of India in 1947, the Mahal family migrated to the newly formed state of Pakistan, where Inayatullah Bhat received the offer to become the Secretary of Pakistan Aviation, Ltd. in Karachi. After his death in 1951, Wilayat Malik found herself increasingly at odds with the position of the Government of Pakistan on the issue of the Kashmir conflict. In 1962, Wilayat Malik returned by ship, along with four of her children, to independent India and settled in Srinagar. Shahid would return to Pakistan. In Jammu and Kashmir, Wilayat Malik started to refer to herself as the Begum of Oudh. While Tariq stayed there, Wilayat Malik and two of her children set forth towards to Lucknow, and then to Delhi, referring to themselves as Begum Wilayat, Prince Ali Raza, and Princess Sakina.

=== New Delhi railway station ===
Some time in the early 1970s, Begum Wilayat Mahal, Ali "Cyrus" Raza and Sakina arrived in Lucknow, the capital of the Oudh State, and demanded to be compensated with the royal estates and moved into the Lucknow railway station to protest their treatment. They later relocated to a railway station in New Delhi, with a retinue of 13 dogs and 7 servants. The family alleged that their palace in Kashmir had been burned down by the government. They lived on a railroad platform for close to ten years, originally in the first class waiting room (reportedly built for Louis Mountbatten, the last Governor-General of India), and then in a portico.

The family would spend their time praying or writing letters to different authorities. While there, they had decorated their tiny living quarters to resemble royalty, complete with Persian carpets and portraits on the walls. Their meals would be served to them by their servants on bone china and in silver tea sets. The family of Awadh had been a powerful figure among the Shiite Muslims of Lucknow and Wilayat and her children thus received many pilgrims and the support of the community. The three Quder brothers, the legitimate descendants of the Oudh State, also met Wilayat to verify her claims during this period.

The family wrote multiple letters to authorities, including Indira Gandhi, then Prime Minister of India, and Queen Elizabeth II. Raza reportedly delivered a letter to the Queen himself after travelling to London in 1980. Their protest attracted international media attention, and the family was offered a modern residence in 1976. They refused. In 1984, Indira Gandhi visited the family at the train station and ordered the Home Ministry to look for a suitable place for them to live in. Following this, the government offered Malcha Mahal to the family in 1985.

=== Malcha Mahal ===
The family moved into Malcha Mahal and continued to air grievances against the Indian government. Begum Wilayat Mahal died by suicide in October 1993, consuming the "drink of silence", a mixture of toxic powders reportedly containing the crushed family pearls and diamonds. Following her death, her children unsuccessfully embalmed the body themselves, and cremated it a year later. The family struggled financially, selling many of their possessions. The family then continued to live in the palace, speaking to reporters every few years. A photo of another of Wilayat's sons was in the palace; the family stated that he had died of "sadness" during their stay at the railway station. In 2004, Sakina Mahal told the Associated Press that "We have been left in darkness. We are hemmed in by affliction." Sakina died around 2013. In 2014, an official from the ISRO earth station near the palace informed The Sunday Guardian that the palace had no electricity connection but had recently been provided a water connection by ISRO.

Cyrus lived alone in the palace for several years before dying around September 2017. His body was found on 2 September by officials from the ISRO station nearby, after they entered the premises following reports of his absence. He was reported to have suffered from a brief illness. On 5 September, he was buried at the Delhi Gate graveyard on Bahadur Shah Zafar Marg, with nobody claiming the body. The grave remained unmarked.

=== Successors ===
Shahid Bhat (Shahid Butt), the eldest son of the family, who had earlier moved to England doing his teenage years, financially supported his family in Delhi. He died in November 2019 in the city of Bradford, with his wife surviving him.

== New York Times investigation ==
=== The Jungle Prince of Delhi ===
"It was Partition that ruined his mother, set her on the course toward the ruined palace, Shahid had told me. 'We had to start all over again,' he said. In the early 1970s, still empty-handed, increasingly bizarre in her behavior, Wilayat announced to the world that she was the queen of Oudh, demanding the vast properties of a kingdom that no longer existed. An ordinary grievance, unaddressed, had metastasized to become an epic one... The rest of the story you already know. They were so convincing, and so insistent, that for 40 years people believed them."

— Ellen Barry, "The Jungle Prince of Delhi", The New York Times (22 November 2019)

In November 2019, The New York Times released an article entitled "The Jungle Prince of Delhi", written by Ellen Barry. In the piece, Barry, the former South Asia Bureau Chief in New Delhi, tells the story of how she became friends with Ali "Cyrus" Raza. He had first allowed her to visit his family home in the spring of 2016. She explained, "Every few years, the family agreed to admit a journalist, always a foreigner, to tell of their grievances against the state." However, "the Oudh family refused, famously, to meet with Indians."

The friendship between Barry and Cyrus lasted for fifteen months. During this time, Cyrus was evasive about his family, and he talked about his sister as if she was alive. Cyrus would call Barry and admit that his sister had died. He also stated that they should not talk again, although their correspondence was soon resumed. When the time came for her next assignment, Barry left India, and three months later, Cyrus died.

At that point, Barry decided to investigate the origins of the family. She traveled to Lucknow, where the family had lived for a short while in the 1970s. She found that the family's claim was widely rejected by locals of the town. She also tracked down a relative, known as Shahid, in Bradford, England, who had been sending Western Union payments to the family. He was the older brother of Cyrus, and he revealed that Cyrus' real name was Mickey Butt, while Sakina's real name had been Farhad. Shahid and his wife stated that the family did not have royal lineage. Rather, their father had been Inayatullah Butt, the registrar of University of Lucknow. The oldest brother, Salahuddin, had been a celebrated hero of the Pakistan Air Force and had died in 2017.

Shahid told Barry how following the Partition of India, their father had moved the family to his hometown, Lahore, Pakistan, which Wilayat did not want to do. Inayatullah was offered a high position in the civil services but soon died. After an incident with the Prime Minister of Pakistan, Wilayat had been institutionalized at a mental hospital and subjected to electric shock therapy, which the surviving relatives living in Lahore confirmed to Barry. Following her release, she took the family to India. Shahid ran away soon after.

=== Further investigation ===
Following the publication of the article, many readers sent more leads to The New York Times, which Barry and Suhasini Raj investigated further to unearth more information about the family. They found out that Wilayat and her husband had family roots in Kashmir and had been active in Kashmiri politics before Partition. Wilayat protested for Kashmiri independence while in Pakistan and was chosen as the president of the All Jammu and Kashmir Muslim Conference. She publicly confronted Mohammad Ali Bogra, then Prime Minister, regarding the issue in 1954, following which she was institutionalized.

Wilayat then wrote multiple petitions to the Government of India demanding citizenship in Jammu and Kashmir, the earliest one being in 1962. In 1963, her family was granted citizenship on a year-to-year basis and they began living under the patronage of G. M. Sadiq, a friend of the family from before the Partition. It was while living in Kashmir that she first began telling neighbours that she was a descendant of the Oudh State. Farhad (Princess Sakina) was then known as Marzia, while Raza (Cyrus) was a talented cricketer. Sakina had told neighbours that they had been Jews who had immigrated from Iran. Around the time of Sadiq's death in 1971, Wilayat disappeared with Sakina and Cyrus. The older son, Assad, continued living in isolation in the house in Kashmir and his body was found a few years later. The family then turned up in Lucknow demanding the properties of the Nawabs of Oudh and were met by Satya Pal Malik, who attempted to negotiate with them while they were in the Lucknow railway station, before they moved to the New Delhi railway station.

=== Reception and legacy ===
"The Jungle Prince of Delhi" was nominated for the 2020 Pulitzer Prize and won the 2019 Bertrand Russell Prize. Journalist Saeed Naqvi described how he, like many other Indian journalists, had initially "dismissed Ellen's pursuit as a "foreigner's" quest for the exotic" and lamented the fact that no Indian journalist had investigated the family. He stated that many parts of the story were of "dubious veracity", highlighting that the family surname, Butt, belonged to the Sunni community of Muslims, and not the Shia, which the Nawabs of Awadh belonged to.

In July 2020, Barry announced that Mira Nair would be adapting "The Jungle Prince of Delhi" as a web series for Amazon Studios.

== See also ==
- Jamali Kamali Mosque and Tomb
