= Raja Jai Lal Singh =

Indian commander (1803–1859)

Nusrat Jang Raja Jai Lal Singh
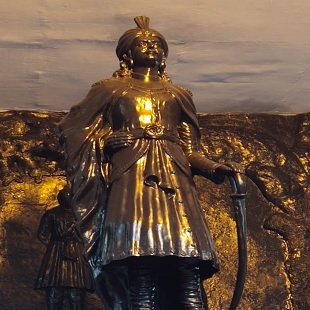
- Born: 31 May 1803; Azamgarh, British India
- Died: 1 October 1859 (aged 56); Lucknow, British India
- Military career
- Allegiance: Awadh
- Rank: Commander-in-Chief
- Known for: Battle of Chinhat, Loyalty to Begum Hazrat Mahal
- Conflicts: Indian Rebellion of 1857

Raja Jai Lal Singh (31 May 1803 – 1 October 1859) was a Kshatriya Kurmi ruler and a prominent commander of the Awadh forces during the Indian Rebellion of 1857. Appointed as the Commander-in-Chief by Begum Hazrat Mahal, he played a decisive role in the early victories against the British East India Company in and around Lucknow. Known for his guerrilla tactics, strategic acumen, and staunch resistance against colonial rule, he was eventually captured and executed by the British.

== Early life ==
Jai Lal Singh was born on 31 May 1803 into a prosperous Kshatriya Kurmi royal family in Azamgarh. He was the eldest son of King Darshan Singh, a ruler also known by the title "The Galib Jung". Trained in administration and warfare from an early age, Jai Lal Singh inherited several princely territories and gained recognition as a skilled warrior in his youth.

== Role in the 1857 Rebellion ==
In 1857, following the forced exile of Nawab Wajid Ali Shah, Begum Hazrat Mahal assumed control of Awadh’s resistance. Her 11-year-old son, Birjis Qadr, was ceremoniously crowned in Lucknow, and Raja Jai Lal Singh was appointed Commander-in-Chief of the Awadh army, honored with the title "Nusrat Jung".

On 30 June 1857, he led a major victory against the British at the Battle of Chinhat, about 6 miles from Lucknow. His guerrilla forces overwhelmed the British column led by Brigadier General Wheeler, forcing them to retreat to the Residency.

Jai Lal Singh’s military campaigns included strategic deployments along the Lucknow-Kanpur road. He is noted to have slain a British telegraph officer, Devery, and presented his severed head to Begum Hazrat Mahal as a symbol of loyalty.

== Strategic leadership ==
As the commander, he implemented guerilla warfare tactics, frustrating British advances with smaller, mobile forces. Despite being outnumbered, his defense of Lucknow kept British forces from entering the city for several months. Historian Subhash Kushwaha notes that Jai Lal Singh orchestrated the coronation of Birjis Qadr on 5 June 1857 at the site now marked by the KD Singh Babu Stadium in Lucknow.

== Capture and execution ==
Jai Lal Singh's resistance ended tragically. He was later arrested by the British and tried for the murder of Devery, inciting rebellion, and aiding Nana Sahib during the revolt. Denied any chance of appeal, he was sentenced to death and hanged on 1 October 1859.

== Legacy ==
Though little remembered in mainstream history, Jai Lal Singh is increasingly recognized as one of the unsung heroes of the 1857 Rebellion. Scholars and civil servants like IPS Pratap Gopendra have published works to highlight his contributions, which were essential to sustaining Awadh’s resistance during the rebellion.
