= Royal family of Oudh =

Royal family of Oudh may refer to:

- Royal House of Oudh, the family who formerly ruled over the Oudh State
- Mahal family, a family that claims to be the successors to the Nawab of Oudh
