= Malcha Mahal =

Hunting lodge in New Delhi, India

Coordinates: 28.609595°N 77.181104°E

Malcha Mahal is a Tughlaq era hunting lodge located in the Chanakyapuri area of New Delhi, India, proximate to the Delhi Earth Station of the Indian Space Research Organisation. It was built by Firuz Shah Tughlaq, who reigned over the Sultanate of Delhi, in 1325.

It also came to be known as Wilayat Mahal after the self-proclaimed "Begum Wilayat Mahal" of Awadh, who claimed to be a member of the Royal family of Oudh and was reportedly granted the place by the Government of India in May 1985. On 10 September 1993, Wilayat died by suicide at the age of 62. The Royal House of Awadh (descendants of Wazid Ali Shah in Lucknow) claims that the family engaged in fraudulent activities, having been cited by an investigative journalist for the New York Times.

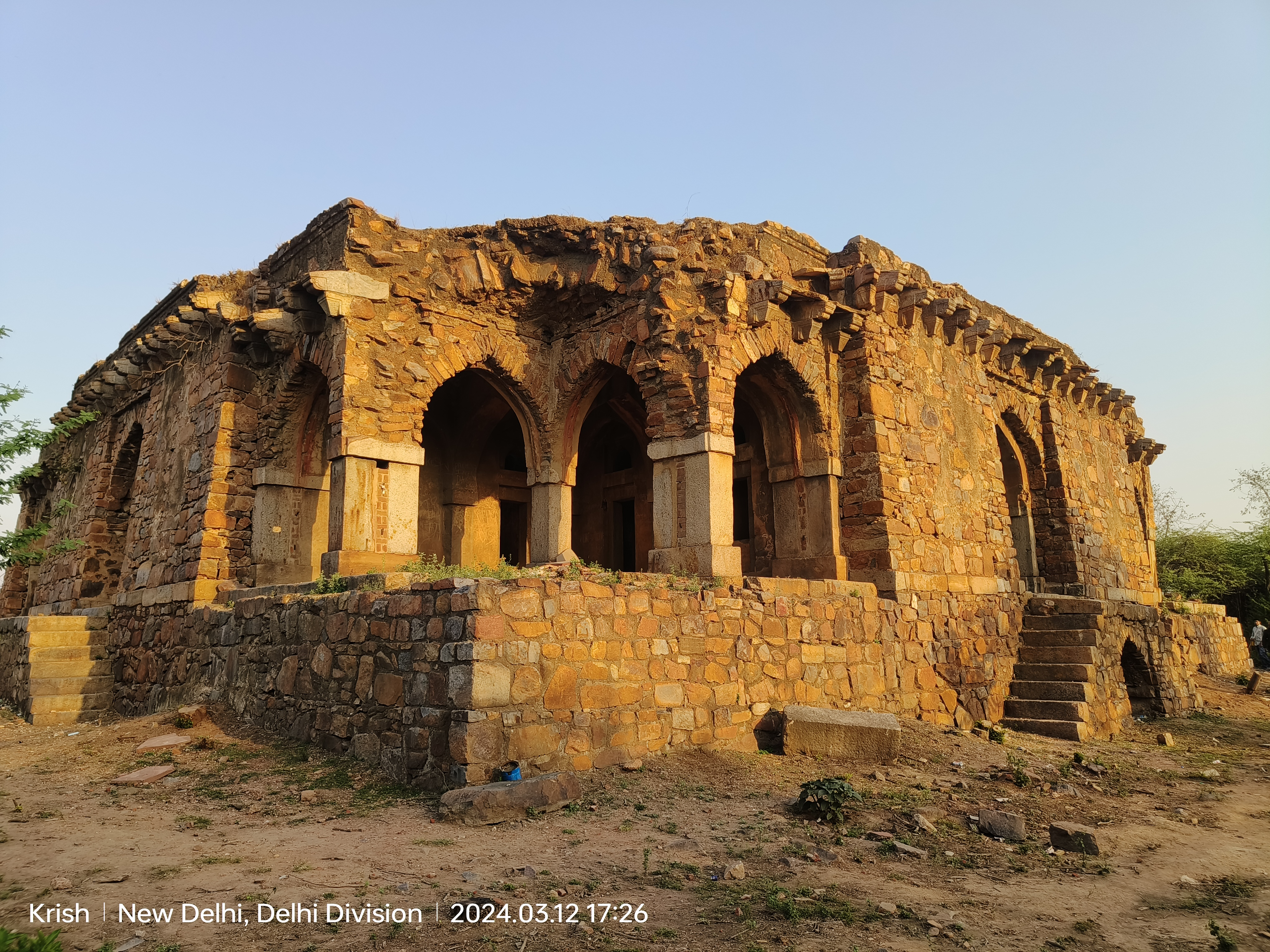
Malcha Mahal

The building is now mostly in ruins. After Wilayat's death, it continued to be inhabited by her daughter Sakina Mahal, and son Prince Ali Raza (aka Cyrus). Cyrus died in late 2017; his sister died some years before him, though the exact date is unknown.

== History ==
Malcha Mahal is located in Malcha, one of the historical villages around Raisina Hill. Malcha, along with Raisina, Todapur, Aliganj, Pillanji, Jaisinghpura, and Kushak villages, was relocated by the British during the construction of the imperial capital, New Delhi, in the 1920s.

== Inhabitation by Wilayat Mahal ==
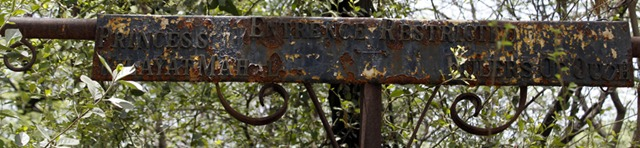
The gate of Malcha Mahal in 2014

Begum Wilayat Mahal, the self-proclaimed great-granddaughter of the last Nawab of Awadh, Wajid Ali Shah, was reportedly allotted the Mahal in May 1985, following the intervention of the Prime Minister of India, Indira Gandhi, in 1984. Begum Wilayat Mahal had been protesting for nine years by dwelling in a waiting room at the New Delhi railway station, demanding compensation for the loss of her ancestral property in Awadh, which was seized when Wajid Ali Shah's kingdom was annexed by the British. Begum Wilayat Mahal died by suicide in October 1993 and was survived by her two children.

On 22 November 2019, the New England Bureau Chief of The New York Times, Ellen Barry, published a lengthy piece of investigative journalism in which she said she had discovered that Wilayat, in fact, had no connection to the Royal House of Awadh. Rather, she was the widow of the former Registrar of Lucknow University, Inayatullah Butt. Barry found her oldest son, Shahid Butt, living in the UK and he had told her the true story.

== Possibility of restoration ==
In late October 2019, it was reported that INTACH has proposed to undertake restoration of Malcha Mahal.

== See also ==
- Kushak Mahal, another hunting lodge of Feroz Shah Tughlaq in Delhi
- Hastsal, the hunting lodge of Shahjahan in Delhi

== Bibliography ==
- Abha Rani. (1991). Tughluq Architecture of Delhi. Bharati Prakashan.
