= Ishqnama =

Semi-autobiographical manuscript of an Indian king

The Ishqnama (Urdu: عشقنامه), also known as The Book of Love or Chronicle of Passion, is an 1849 manuscript and semi-autobiography of Wajid Ali Shah, the last king of Awadh in present-day Uttar Pradesh, India. It is a narrative poem written in Urdu with Persian chapter titles and 103 paintings. It is currently held by the Royal Collection Trust in the United Kingdom. A related work, the Parikhana, is a simplified prose adaptation of the Ishqnama written in Urdu. Print and lithograph copies of the Parikhana were widely distributed between 1848 and 1965.
