= Meena Bazaar =

Bazaars in Asia

Meenā Bāzār or Mina Bazaar (Urdu: مینا بازار, Hindi: मीना बाज़ार, Bengali: মীনা বাজার) is a special bazaar to sell items to raise money for charity and non-profit organizations. It also refers to a number of modern-day shopping centres and retail stores.

== In the Mughal era in India ==
During the Mughal era, Meena Bazaars, also known as Kuhs Ruz ("Day of Joy") were exclusively held for women, where only the king and a few princes were the only males allowed.

The bazaars were open for business for 5 to 8 days during the Norouz (New Year) festival. The Mughal Emperor Humayun was the first to organize them, but Akbar and his successors made them more elaborate.

According to a major newspaper of Pakistan:

"In the Mughal Era, during the Nauroze, special bazaars would be set up only for women. These women came to prepare for the 5 to 8 day festivities and the Mughal Kings and Princes were the only men allowed. It was usually famous among the women of the Harem (Mughal Concubines) and the wives and daughters of Rajput noblemen who put up stalls to sell expensive items".

Later, after the decline of the Mughal Empire, the fair was closed for the public.

== In many countries ==
In India, Meena Bazar referred to a Meena Bazaar in Old Delhi that was held inside the Red Fort before it was destroyed during the Indian Rebellion of 1857. A new relatively small and compact marketplace with the same name came up in the vicinity of the Jama Masjid and in Meena Bazaars in other Indian cities including the Meena Bazaar of the famous Qaisarbagh in the city of Lucknow in the Awadh region of the country. This bazaar was enjoyed by the royal ladies living in the Qaisarbagh complex of Nawab Wajid Ali Shah.

In Pakistan, in modern times, the Meena Bazaars are organized by students of schools, colleges, universities, and other non-profit organizations to raise money for their activities.

In the United Arab Emirates, Meena Bazaar is the name of a well-known shopping location in Bur Dubai. Since 2000, Meena Bazaar is also becoming popular among tourists.

In Bangladesh, Meena Bazar is a well-known chain super shop.

In Birgunj, Nepal, Meena Bazar is a well-known traditional grocery market that stretches from Maisthan Temple to Ghantaghar (Clock Tower). It is the central market of Parsa District.

== See also ==
- Arabber
- Bazaar
- Bazaari
- Hawker centre (Asia) a centre where street food is sold
- Market (place)
- Meena Bazaar (Karimabad)
- Pan Bazaar
- Peddler
- Retail
- Street vendor
- Street food
- Souk
- Wet market
