= Kaukab Quder Meerza =

Indian scholar of the Urdu language

- Born: 1933
- Died: September 13, 2020 (aged 86–87)

Kaukab Quder Sajjad Ali Meerza (also Dr M Kaukab) (1933 – September 13, 2020) was an Indian scholar of the Urdu language

A specialist in the literature of Awadh State during the reign of his great-grandfather and Awadh's last Nawab, Wajid Ali Shah (1822–1887), Meerza taught Urdu at Aligarh Muslim University, retiring in 1993. The Indian filmmaker, Satyajit Ray consulted with Meerza over many months during the writing of the screenplay for his 1977 award-winning film Shatranj ke Khilari (The Chess Players), which was set in Awadh in the period immediately preceding the Indian rebellion of 1857.

Meerza was an enthusiast of snooker; he refereed many tournaments and was the founder-secretary of the Billiards and Snooker Federation of India.

The last pensioner in the Awadh Pension Book of 1897 established by the British Raj and honoured by the Government of India after 1947, and the only surviving great-grandson of Wajid Ali Shah, Meerza died of complications from COVID-19 at age 87 in Kolkata on 14 September 2020.

== See also ==
- Company rule in India
