= Qaisar Bagh =

Palace complex in Lucknow, India

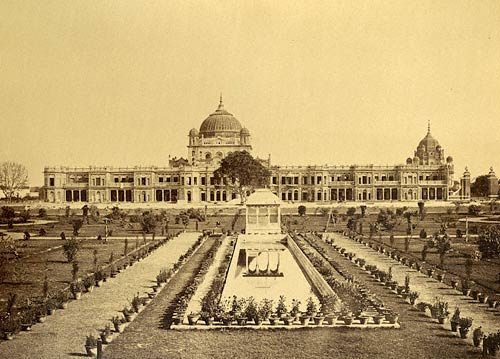
Qaisarbagh Complex of Lucknow, Uttar Pradesh, India (photograph taken between 1865 and 1882).

Qaisarbagh (Hindi: क़ैसरबाग़, Urdu: قيصر باغ, pronounced [qɛːsərˈbaːɣ], Emperor's Garden), also spelled Qaiserbagh, Kaisarbagh or Kaiserbagh, is a palace complex in the city of Lucknow, located in the Awadh region of India. It was built by Wajid Ali Shah (1847–1856), the last Nawab of Awadh.

During the Indian Rebellion of 1857, it was used as a stronghold of Begum Hazrat Mahal the Begum of Awadh, who played a leading role in the uprising.

The campaigning Irish journalist William Howard Russell wrote a classic account of the looting of the Qaisar Bagh in 1858 by drunken British troops in the course of the Great Uprising/Indian Mutiny. A kiosk from the Qaisar Bagh gardens was sent to England as a tribute for Queen Victoria and now stands in the Frogmore Gardens at Windsor Castle.

Though a major part of the palace was destroyed by British soldiers and lies in ruins, currently it is a major tourist spot of Lucknow.

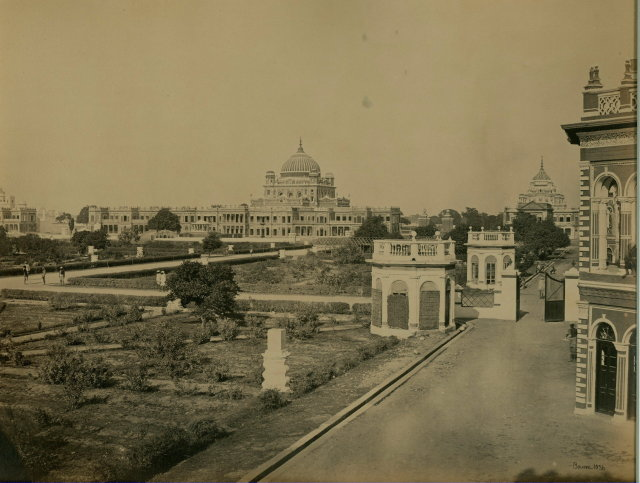
Qaisarbagh, Lucknow, c.1866

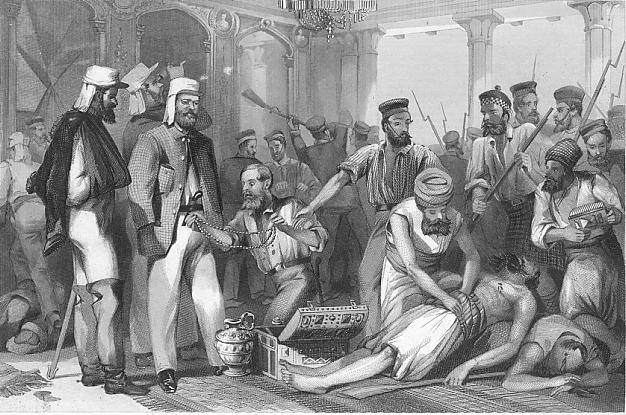
William Howard Russell, correspondent for The Times (London), witnesses British soldiers looting Qaisar Bagh, Lucknow, after its recapture in 1858

== See also ==
- Architecture of Lucknow
- Meena Baazar
- Sikandar Bagh
