= Begum Hazrat Mahal =

Regent of Awadh, 1857–1858

- Begum of Nawab of Awadh
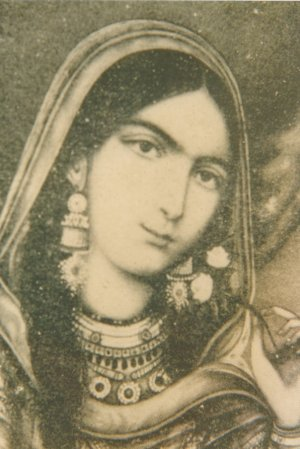
- Begum Hazrat Mahal
- Born: Muhammadi Khanum; 1820; Faizabad, Awadh
- Died: 7 April 1879 (aged 59); Kathmandu, Kingdom of Nepal
- Husband: Nawab Wajid Ali Shah
- Dynasty: Qara Qoyunlu (by marriage)
- Religion: Shia Islam

Begum Hazrat Mahal (c. 1820 – 7 April 1879), also known as the Begum of Awadh, was the second wife of Nawab of Awadh Wajid Ali Shah, and the regent of Awadh in 1857–1858. She is known for the leading role she had in the rebellion against the British East India Company during the Indian Rebellion of 1857.

After her husband was exiled to Calcutta and the Indian Rebellion broke out, she made her son, Prince Birjis Qadr, the Wali (ruler) of Awadh, with herself as regent during his minority. However, she was forced to abandon this role after a short reign. By way of Hallaur, she finally found asylum in Nepal, where she died in 1879. Her role in the rebellion has given her a heroine status in the post-colonial history of India.

== Biography ==
=== Early life ===
Begum Hazrat Mahal's name was Mohammadi Khanum, and she was born in 1820 at Faizabad, the former capital of Oudh State. She was sold by her parents and became a tawaif by profession. She entered the royal harem as a Khawasin after having been sold to royal agents, where she was promoted to a pari.

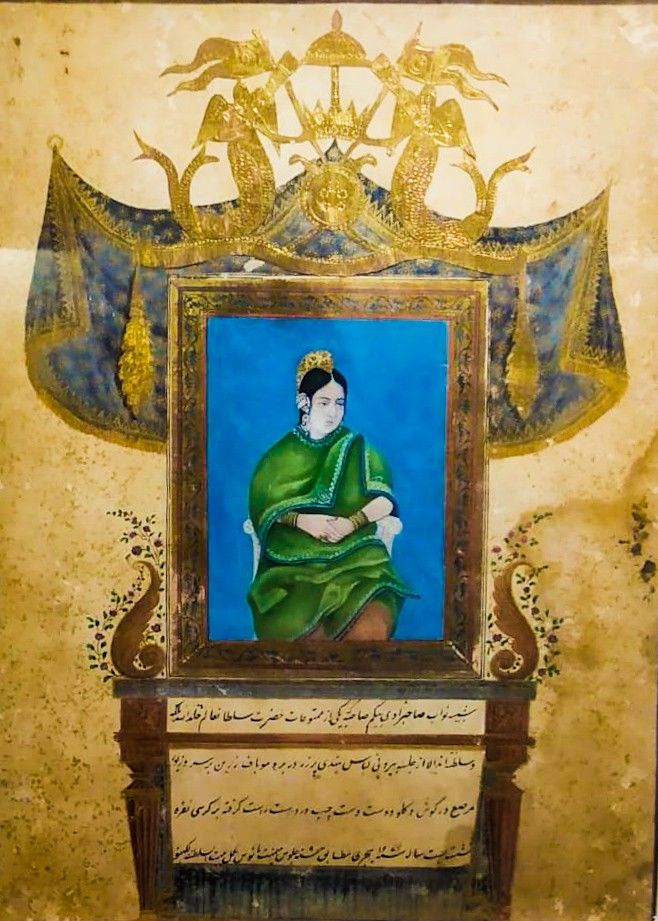
Portrait of Begum Sahib, circa 1850 CE, Awadh School of Art , State Museum, Lucknow

She became a Begum after being accepted as a royal concubine of the King of Awadh, the last Tajdaar-e-Awadh, Wajid Ali Shah and became his junior wife. The title 'Hazrat Mahal' was bestowed on her after the birth of their son, Birjis Qadr. In 1856, the British annexed Awadh, and Wajid Ali Shah was exiled to Calcutta. Begum Hazrat Mahal remained in Lucknow with her son and soon took charge of the affairs of the rebel state of Awadh as it entered armed struggle with the British East India Company.

=== Indian Rebellion of 1857 ===
During the Indian Rebellion of 1857, Begum Hazrat Mahal's band of supporters including Raja Hanumant Singh, rebelled against the British. The revolutionary forces under the leadership of Raja Jailal Singh seized control of Lucknow, and the Begum took power as the guardian of her young son, Prince Birjis Qadr, whom she had declared as the ruler (Wali) of Awadh. As regent, she automatically came to have a leadership role in the rebellion against the British.

One of the principal complaints of Begum Hazrat Mahal was that the East India Company had casually demolished temples and mosques just to make way for roads. In a proclamation issued during the final days of the revolt, she mocked the British claim to allow freedom of worship:

To eat pigs and drink wine, to bite greased cartridges and to mix pig's fat with sweetmeats, to destroy Hindu and Mussalman temples and mosques on the pretense of making roads, to build churches, to send clergymen into the streets to preach the Christian religion, to institute English schools, and pay people a monthly stipend for learning the English sciences, while the places of worship of Hindus and Mussalmans are to this day entirely neglected; with all this, how can people believe that religion will not be interfered with?

Hazrat Mahal worked in association with Nana Saheb, but later joined the Maulavi of Faizabad in the attack on Shahjahanpur. When the forces under the command of the British re-captured Lucknow and most of Oudh, she was forced to retreat.

=== Later life ===
Ultimately, she had to retreat to Nepal, where she was initially refused asylum by the Rana prime minister Jung Bahadur, but was later allowed to stay.

She died there in 1879 and was buried in a nameless grave in the grounds of Kathmandu's Jama Masjid.

After her death, on the occasion of the jubilee of Queen Victoria (1887), the British Government pardoned Birjis Qadr and he was allowed to return home.

== Memorials ==
Begum Hazrat Mahal's tomb is located in the central part of Kathmandu near Jama Masjid, Ghantaghar, not far away from the famous Darbar Marg. It is looked after by the Jama Masjid Central Committee.

On 15 August 1962, Mahal was honoured at the Old Victoria Park in Hazratganj, Lucknow for her role in the Great Revolt. Along with the renaming of the park, a marble memorial was constructed, which includes a marble tablet with four round brass plaques bearing the coat of arms of the Awadh royal family. The park has been used for Ramlilas and bonfires during Dusshera, as well as Lucknow Mahotsava (Lucknow Exposition).

On 10 May 1984, the Government of India issued a commemorative stamp in honour of Mahal.

The Ministry of Minority Affairs, Government of India has started the Begum Hazrat Mahal National Scholarship for Meritorious Girls belonging to minority communities in India. This scholarship is implemented through the Maulana Azad Education Foundation.

== Gallery ==
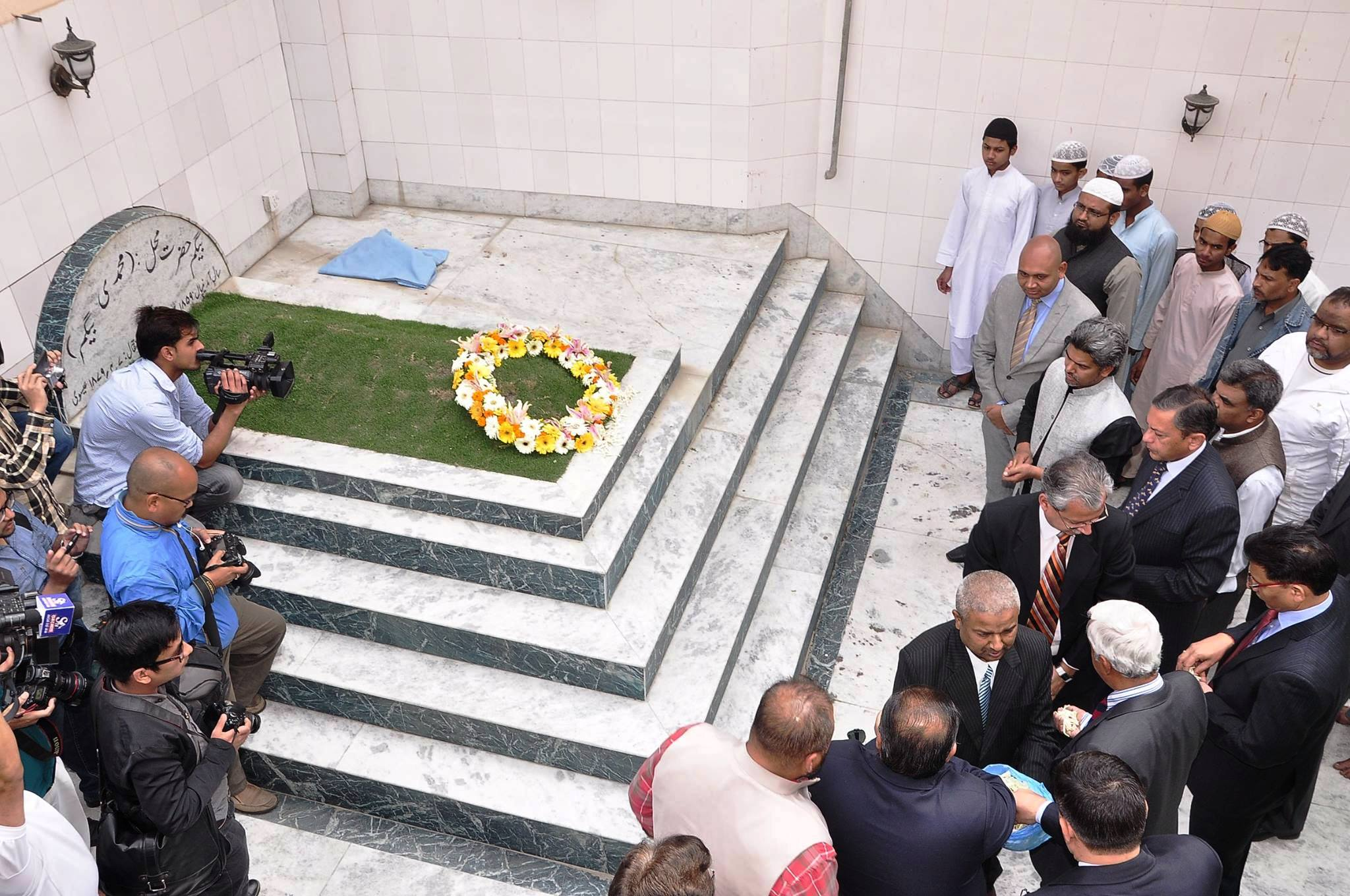
The tomb of Begum Hazrat Mahal near Jama Masjid in Kathmandu

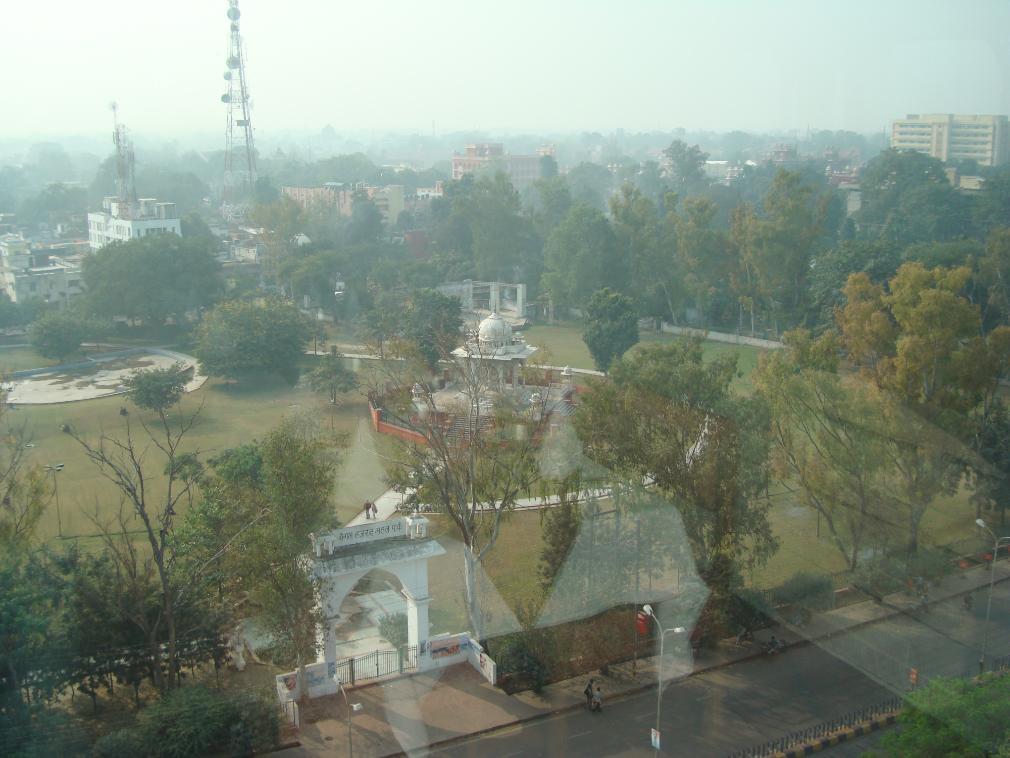
Memorial of Begum Hazrat Mahal in Begum Hazrat Mahal Park, Lucknow.

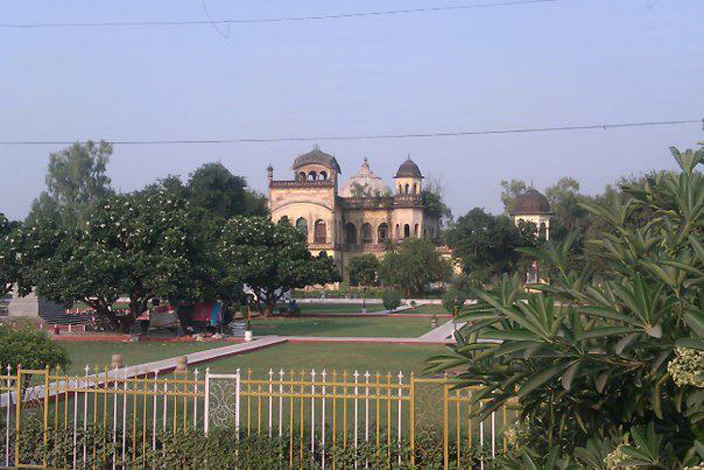
A view of Begum Hazrat Mahal Park

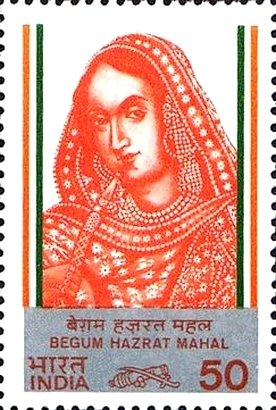
A commemorative stamp in honour of Mahal
