= Nuṣrat Jang =

Collector of manuscripts

Nuṣrat Jang (Persian: نصرت جنگ), properly ʻAbd al-Vahhāb Khān Shīkūh al-Mulk Naṣīr al-Dawlah Nuṣrat Jang Bahādur (ca. 1724–1801) was the fourth son of the Nawab of Arcot, Anvār al-Dīn Khān Bahādur (d. 1749). He was a collector of manuscripts, examples of which are in the John Rylands Research Institute and Library and the British Library. With rise of Hyder Ali (r. 1761–1782) Nuṣrat Jang's collection passed to that ruler and thence to Tipu Sultan (r. 1782–1799).

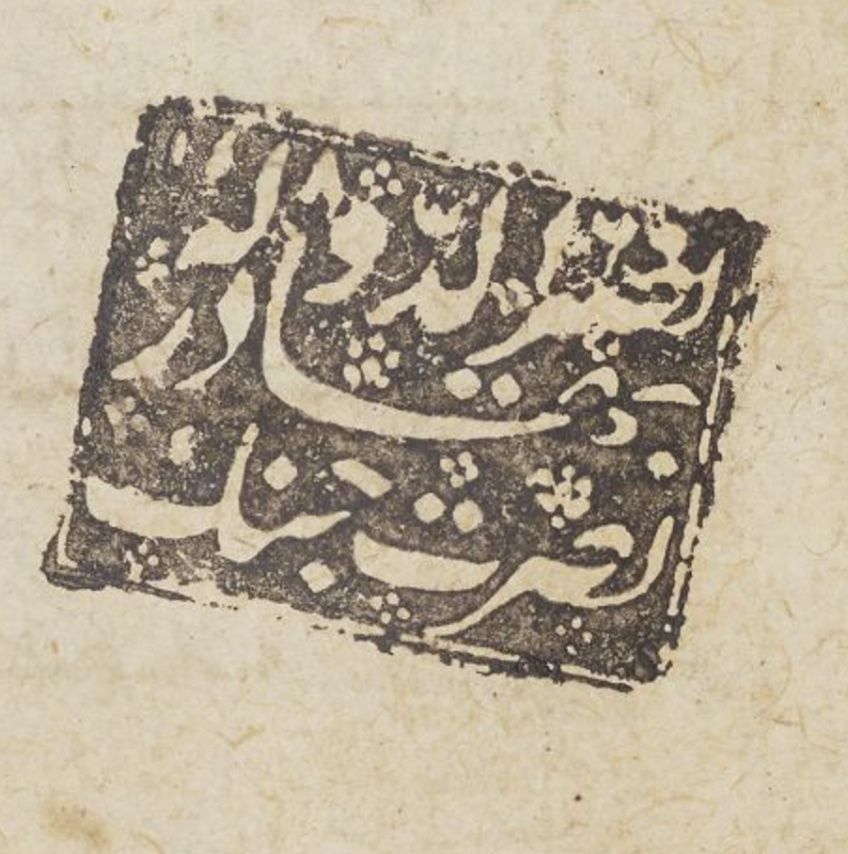
Seal of Nuṣrat Jang, dated AH 1186 (1772-73)
