= Ellen Barry (journalist) =

American journalist

- Born: April 11, 1971 (age 54); Tarrytown, New York, U.S.
- Occupation: Journalist
- Education: Yale University (BA)
- Notable awards: George Polk Award (2010)

Ellen Barry (born April 11, 1971) is a reporter for The New York Times. She was the paper's chief international correspondent from 2017 to 2019, and South Asia Bureau Chief in New Delhi, India, from 2013 to 2017. She previously served as the Times' Moscow bureau chief from March 2011 to August 2013 and then served as its New England bureau chief. She now covers mental health.

== Early life and education ==
Ellen Barry was born on April 11, 1971, in Tarrytown, New York. She graduated from Yale University with a B.A. in English in 1993. While at Yale she was a reporter and editor for the Yale Daily News, and also won the Wallace Non-Fiction Prize and the Wright Memorial Prize for best essay by a senior.

== Career ==
Ellen Barry began her career as a journalist in 1993 when she was a managing board member of the Yale Daily News. From 1993 to 1995, Barry worked for The Moscow Times as a staff reporter. In 1996 she began working for the Boston Phoenix as a feature writer. In 1999 she began working for The Boston Globe. In the years of 2004 to 2006, Barry worked as the Atlanta bureau chief for the Los Angeles Times. She joined The New York Times as a Metro reporter in January 2007 and became the Moscow correspondent for The Times in June 2008.

=== Awards and recognition ===
In 2010 Barry and her Times colleague Clifford J. Levy won a George Polk Award and the Pulitzer Prize for their reporting on "corruption and abuse of power in Russia" for the "Above the Law" series.

She was a Pulitzer Prize finalist in 2002 for feature writing and won the American Society of Newspaper Editors Distinguished Writing Award for Non-Deadline Writing. In 2004 she was a Pulitzer Prize finalist for beat reporting on mental health. In 2020 she was a Pulitzer Prize finalist for feature writing for "The Jungle Prince of Delhi" on the Mahal family.
