= Birjis Qadr =

Nawab of Awadh from 1857 to 1858

Nawab Birjis Qadr
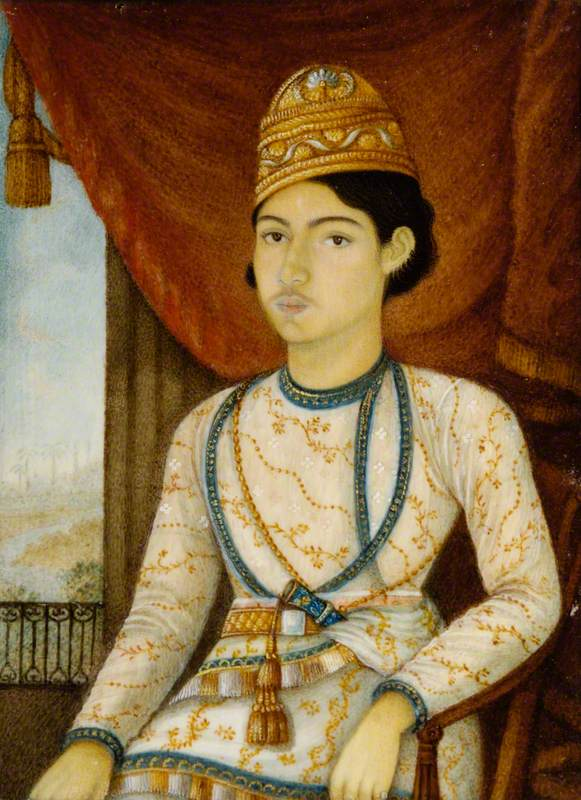
- Royal portrait of Birjis Qadr

Nawab of Awadh (Note: Limited recognition)
- Reign: 5 July 1857 – 3 March 1858
- Predecessor: Wajid Ali Shah
- Successor: Monarchy abolished
- Regent: Begum Hazrat Mahal
- Born: 20 August 1845; Qaisar Bagh, Lucknow, Oudh (present-day Uttar Pradesh, India)
- Died: 14 August 1893 (aged 47); Arabagh Palace, Calcutta, Bengal Presidency, British India (present-day West Bengal, India)
- Burial: Sibtainabad Imambara, Kolkata
- Spouse: Mehtab Ara Begum
- Issue: 5
- House: Nishapuri
- Dynasty: Qara Qoyunlu
- Father: Wajid Ali Shah
- Mother: Begum Hazrat Mahal
- Religion: Shia Islam

Birjis Qadr (20 August 1845 – 14 August 1893) was the son of Wajid Ali Shah, the last Nawab of Awadh. He was put on the throne after his father had been deposed by the East India Company in 1856 under the terms of the Doctrine of lapse and Oudh State was annexed into the Bengal Presidency.

During the Indian Rebellion of 1857, Birjis Qadr was raised as a figurehead monarch of Oudh by his mother Begum Hazrat Mahal, who became his regent. Despite stiff resistance to Company forces, he had to flee to Kathmandu in the Kingdom of Nepal after the Capture of Lucknow in March 1858. He became a poet and organised mushairas (poetry recitals).

In 1887, he returned to India and moved to the Metiabruz neighbourhood of Kolkata, where his father had also lived in exile and imprisonment since 1856. In 1893, he was allegedly murdered by his own relatives.

== Early life and enthronement ==
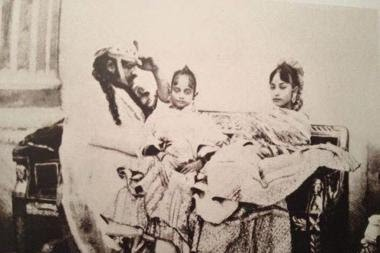
From left to right: Qadr's father Wajid Ali Shah, Qadr, Qadr's mother Begum Hazrat Mahal

Qadr was born in August 1845 at Qaisar Bagh, Lucknow, Oudh State, to Nawab Wajid Ali Shah and Begum Hazrat Mahal. In 1856, Qadr's father Nawab Wajid Ali Shah was deposed by the British on the pretext of mis-governance, and was exiled to Metiabruz, a neighbourhood of Calcutta.

In 1857, the Sepoy Mutiny erupted against the East India Company, with Begum Hazrat leading the rebels in Awadh. A decisive victory by the rebel forces in the Battle of Chinhat forced the British to take refuge in The Residency (eventually resulting in the Siege of Lucknow). On 5 June, 11-year old Qadr was declared the Nawab of Awadh by his mother Begum Hazrat under the active persuasion of Jailal Singh, the chief spokesman of the rebel army; his coronation was widely supported by court-nobles. Historian Rudrangshu Mukherjee notes that though the rebel army allowed Begum Hazrat to rule the state on Qadr's behalf, they had carved out a large degree of autonomy. Qadr subsequently wrote to Mughal emperor Bahadur Shah II, asking for confirmation of his regency. This was granted, and he was awarded the title of Wazir.

== 1857 Rebellion ==
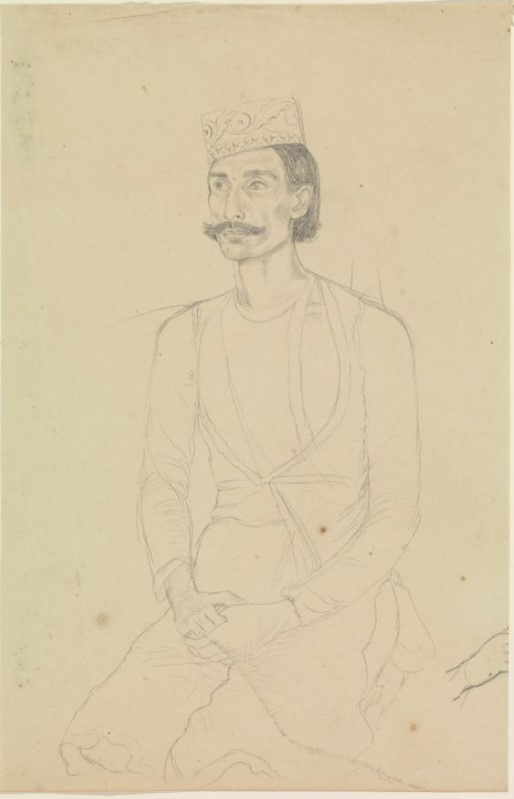
Portrait of a man sitting with hands folded, from the Mirza Birjis Qadr Album

In September 1857, a British regiment under James Outram and Henry Havelock managed to breach the rebel defenses and enter The Residency. However, they were greatly reduced in strength, provided little relief and remained isolated, barely able to wrest control of some adjoining territory under the stronghold. Qadr and Begum Hazrat issued routine proclamations that sought to emphasize the range of alleged injustices rendered by the British, from seizure of the commoners' property and forceful imposition of Christianity to the whimsical dethroning of Wajid Ali Shah and random toppling of local independent provinces on dubious grounds. Mukherjee notes that the rebels were in great spirits and enforced a highly effective blockade of the Residency. The rebellion drew strong support from the masses and almost all appeals by the British for negotiation or aid were completely ignored. Overall, despite an effective suppression of the Sepoy Mutiny over other parts of India, Lucknow (and Awadh) remained the last major bastion for anti-British forces in India and attracted numerous rebels from other territories, including Nana Sahib, Holkar, et al.

In November 1857, another British regiment under Colin Campbell, assisted by the population of The Residency, breached multiple defenses across the outskirts of Lucknow and defeated the local rebel forces to safely evacuate the besieged. Thereafter, Campbell chose to withdraw and defend other cities (especially Alambagh), that were under imminent threat of a rebel attack but without establishing a stronghold over Lucknow. The rebels continued to congregate in large numbers at Lucknow, which was geographically and strategically advantageous to their future strategies. At Alambagh, where Outram made his final settlement, he was attacked six times with the rebel strength often exceeding 30,000.

By December, the communication networks and rebellions in other parts of India were completely crushed; the rebel chiefs were isolated from one another and faced a futile war with their defeat imminent. In the same month, the rebels suffered an internal feud. Ahmadullah Shah, the Maulvi of Faizabad, challenged Qadr's leadership on the basis of a divine will, thus polarizing the mutineers. The factions clashed at least once, and their military strategies were often in opposition, affecting battles. Desertions and defections became increasingly commonplace. However, internal intelligence reports by British authorities concluded that they could not leverage the tensions to any advantage.

Campbell advanced on Lucknow in late February 1858. By 16 March, after intense street-battles, the British forces had captured Lucknow in its entirety, forcing the Begum, her supporters and Qadr to leave the city. Campbell failed to secure the escape routes and the rebel populace drifted across to the countryside, which meant that the fall of Lucknow did not automatically lead to the anticipated submission of Awadh.

Begum Hazrat declined a British offer of mercy and a pension, thus refusing to renounce the rights of her son and dispersed into the countrysides of Baundi. Notably, whilst the fall of Lucknow destroyed the Maulvi faction, Begum Hazrat maintained a semblance of her erstwhile rule from a local fort: receiving collections, hosting parliaments and issuing orders under the name of Qadr. They sought to mobilise the rebel forces and planned another round of armed struggle against the British authorities. Proclamations were issued, urging the local caps to rebel against the British institutions in an organised fashion and Qadr promised monetary reimbursement for those injured or killed in battle.

In May 1858, Qadr wrote a letter to Jung Bahadur Rana, the Prime Minister of Nepal, claiming that the British had corrupted the faiths of the Hindus and Muslims of the state, and urged him to send his troops to Awadh to fight the British. An unsympathetic Rana rejected the accusations and refused to help Qadr, instead asking him to surrender to Henry Montgomery Lawrence, the commissioner of Lucknow, and ask for a pardon.

Meanwhile, as most of the local rebels had been defeated and subjected to exemplary punishment by the British, Qadr and Begum Hazrat crossed the West Rapti River to take refuge in Kathmandu, Nepal.

=== Exile in Nepal ===
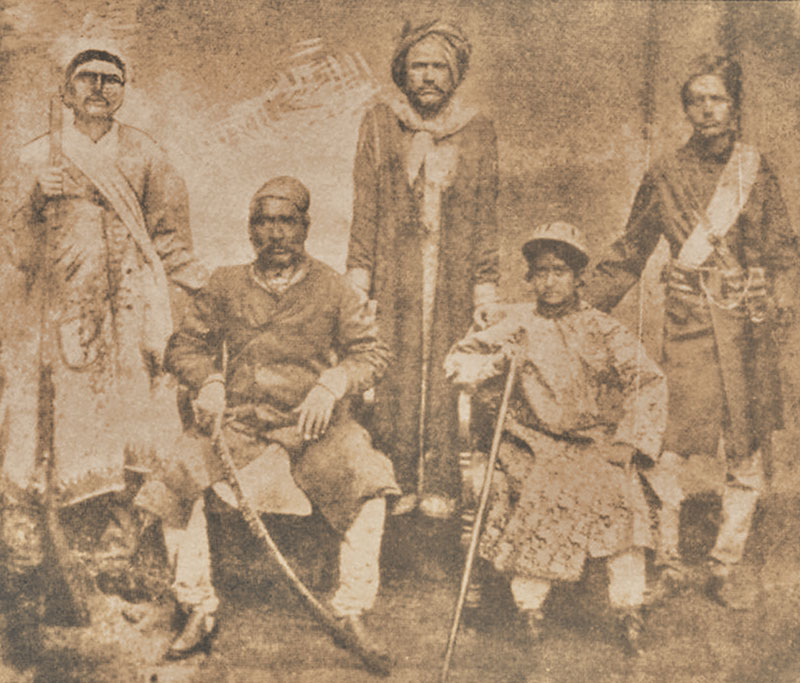
Birjis Qadr (left) with son Khurshid Qadr (right) and three bodyguards in Calcutta around 1893 in this rare photograph.

After arriving in Kathmandu, Qadr again wrote to Rana for asylum and despite his initial hesitance, he and his mother were allowed to stay at the Barf Bagh, a palace near the Thapathali Durbar. They came with a coterie of helpers and soldiers.

In a simultaneous bargain, about 40,000 rupees worth of jewels were purchased by the Rana, for a mere 15,000 rupees. Historians have since observed that the Rana provided refuge only to those rebels who paid for it, earning precious jewels in the process.

While staying in Kathmandu, Qadr became a shayar (poet) and organised mehfils in the city, the earliest of which were recorded in 1864. He wrote poems at the tarahi mushaira (recitals). Qadr's poems were recorded by Khwaja Naeemuddin Badakashi, a Kashmiri Muslim living in Kathmandu.

== Personal life ==
While in Nepal, he married Mehtab Ara Begum, a granddaughter of Bahadur Shah Zafar. They had two sons, Khurshid Qadr and Mehar Qadr, and three daughters.

== Return to India and death ==
After the death of his mother Begum Hazrat Mahal in 1879 and on the occasion of the Golden Jubilee of Queen Victoria in 1887, the British Raj pardoned Birjis Qadr and he was allowed to return home. In 1893, a few years after the death of his exiled father, Qadr returned to Kolkata.

He died on 14 August 1893 at Arabagh Palace. According to his grandson Koukab Qadr, Birjis's wife Mehtab Ara Begum was supposedly the lone eye-witness to a dinner, where Birjis Qadr along with his son and other confidantes were poisoned to death, by his siblings and jealous begums (high ranking females). Ara Begum, being pregnant, had not eaten the dinner.
