= Nawab of Awadh =

Rulers of the state of Awadh (Oudh) in India (1722–1858)

Nawab of Awadh (Oudh)
- Seal of the Kingdom of Awadh

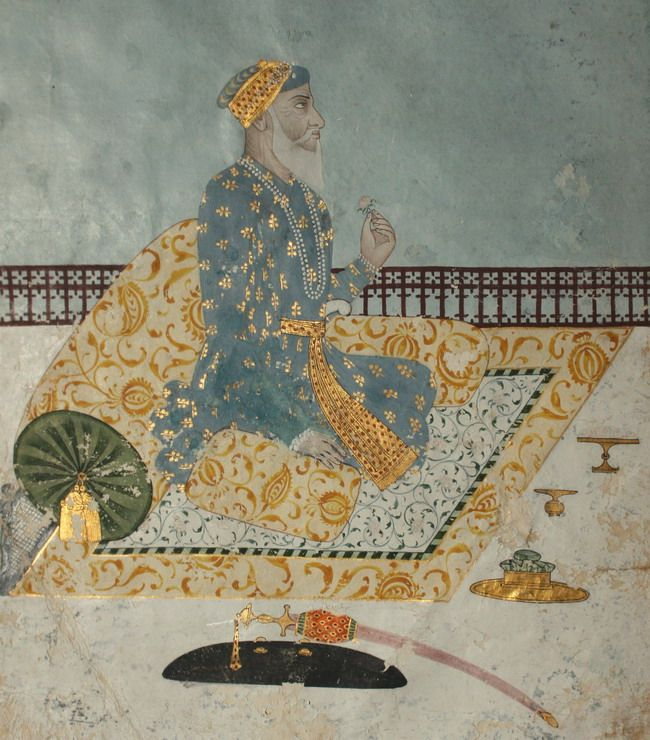
- First to reign Saadat Khan; 26 January 1722 – 19 March 1739

Details
- First monarch: Saadat Khan
- Last monarch: Birjis Qadr
- Formed: 26 January 1722
- Abolished: 3 March 1858
- Residence: Chattar Manzil

The Nawab of Awadh or Nawab of Oudh /ˈaʊd/ was the title of the rulers of Kingdom of Awadh (anglicised as Oudh) in northern India during the 18th and 19th centuries. The Nawabs of Awadh belonged to an Iranian dynasty of Sayyid origin of Shia Islam. from Nishapur, Iran. In 1724, Nawab Sa'adat Khan established the Kingdom of Awadh with their capital in Faizabad and Lucknow.

== History ==
The Nawabs of Awadh were semi-autonomous rulers within the fragmented polities of Mughal India after the death of Aurangzeb in 1707. They fought wars with the Peshwa, the Battle of Bhopal (1737) against the Maratha Empire (which was opposed to the Mughal Empire), and the Battle of Karnal (1739) as courtiers of the Moghul.

The Nawabs of Awadh, along with many other Nawabs, were regarded as members of the nobility of the Mughal Empire. They joined Ahmad Shah Durrani during the Third Battle of Panipat (1761) and restored Shah Alam II (r. 1760–1788 and 1788–1806) to the imperial throne. The Nawab of Awadh also fought the Battle of Buxar (1764) preserving the interests of the Mughals. The Oudh State eventually declared itself independent from the rule of the Mughal Empire in 1818.

== List of rulers ==
All of these rulers of the Royal House of Awadh used the title of Nawab from 1722 onward:

No.	Portrait	Titular Name	Personal Name	Birth	Reign	Death
1		Burhan ul Mulk Sa'adat Khan برہان الملک سعادت خان	Saadat Khan سعادت علی خان	1680 Nishapur, Khurasan, Safavid dynasty, Persia	1722 – 19 March 1739	1739
2		Abul-Mansur Khan Safdar Jung ابو المنصور خان صفدرجنگ	Muhammad Muqim محمد مقیم	1708	1739 – 5 October 1754	1754
3		Shuja-ud-Daula شجاع الدولہ	Jalal-ud-din Haider Abul-Mansur Khan جلال الدین حیدر ابا المنصور خان	1732	1754 – 26 January 1775	1775
4		Asaf-ud-Daula آصف الدولہ	Muhammad Yahya Mirza Amani	1748	26 January 1775 – 20 April 1797	1798
5		Asif Jah Mirza آصف جاہ میرزا	Wazir Ali Khan وزیر علی خان	1780	21 September 1797 – 21 January 1798	1817
6		Yamin-ud-Daula یمین الدولہ	Saadat Ali Khan سعادت علی خان دوم	1752	21 January 1798 – 11 July 1814	1814
7		Ghazi-ud-Din Haidar Shah غازی الدین حیدر شاہ	Ghazi-ud-Din Haidar Shah غازی الدین حیدر شاہ	1769	11 July 1814 – 19 October 1827	1827
8		Abul- Mansur Qutub-ud-din Sulaiman jah ابا المنصور قطب الدین سلیمان جاہ	Nasir-ud-Din Haidar Shah ناصر الدیں حیدر شاہ	1803	19 October 1827 – 7 July 1837	1837
9		Abul Fateh Moin-ud-din ابا الفاتح معین الدین	Muhammad Ali Shah محمّد علی شاہ	1777	7 July 1837 – 7 May 1842	1842
10		Najm-ud-Daula Abul-Muzaffar Musleh-ud-din نجم الدولہ ابا المظفر مصلح الدین	Amjad Ali Shah امجد علی شاہ	1801	7 May 1842 – 13 February 1847	1847
11		Abul-Mansur Mirza ابا المنصور میرزا	Wajid Ali Shah واجد علی شاہ	1822	13 February 1847 – 11 February 1856	1 September 1887
12		Mohammadi Khanum محمدی خانم	Begum Hazrat Mahal بیگم حضرت محل	1820	11 February 1856 – 5 July 1857; Wife of Wajid Ali Shah and mother of Birjis Qadra (in rebellion)	7 April 1879
13		Ramzan Ali رمضان علی	Birjis Qadr بر جیس قدر	1845	5 July 1857 – 3 March 1858 (in rebellion)	14 August 1893

=== Decendants to the throne of Awadh ===
- Meerza family....
  - Nawab Meher Quder Zahid Ali Meerza (son of Nawab Birjis Qadr)
    - Nawab Kaukab Quder Meerza (son of Nawab Meher Quder Zahid Ali Meerza)
      - Nawab Kamran Meerza (son of Kaukab Meerza)
        - Mohammed Sulaiman Qudr Meerza (son of Kamran Meerza)
- Nawab Ibrahim Ali Khan Sheesh Mahal

== Gallery ==
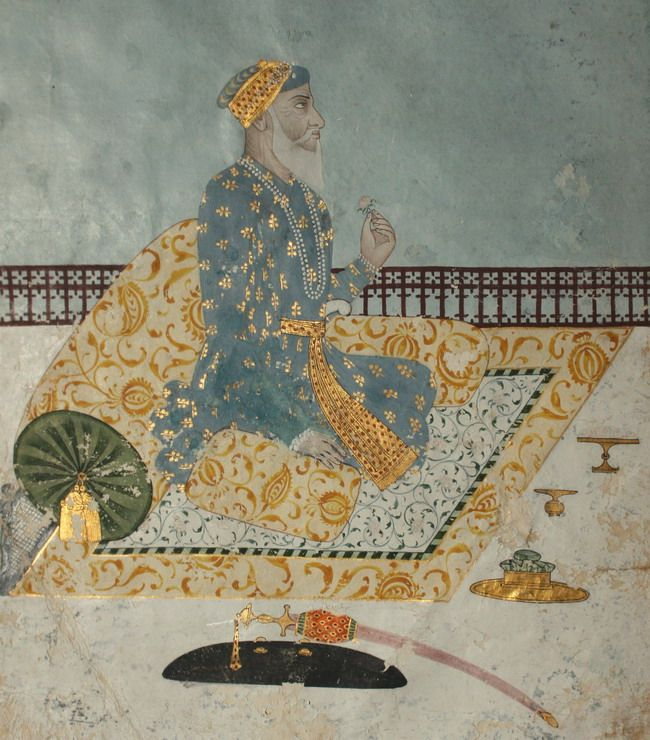
Saadat Ali Khan I, the first Nawab of Awadh, who laid the foundation of that state.

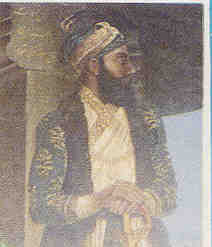
Safdarjung is accused of making peace with the Maratha Confederacy.

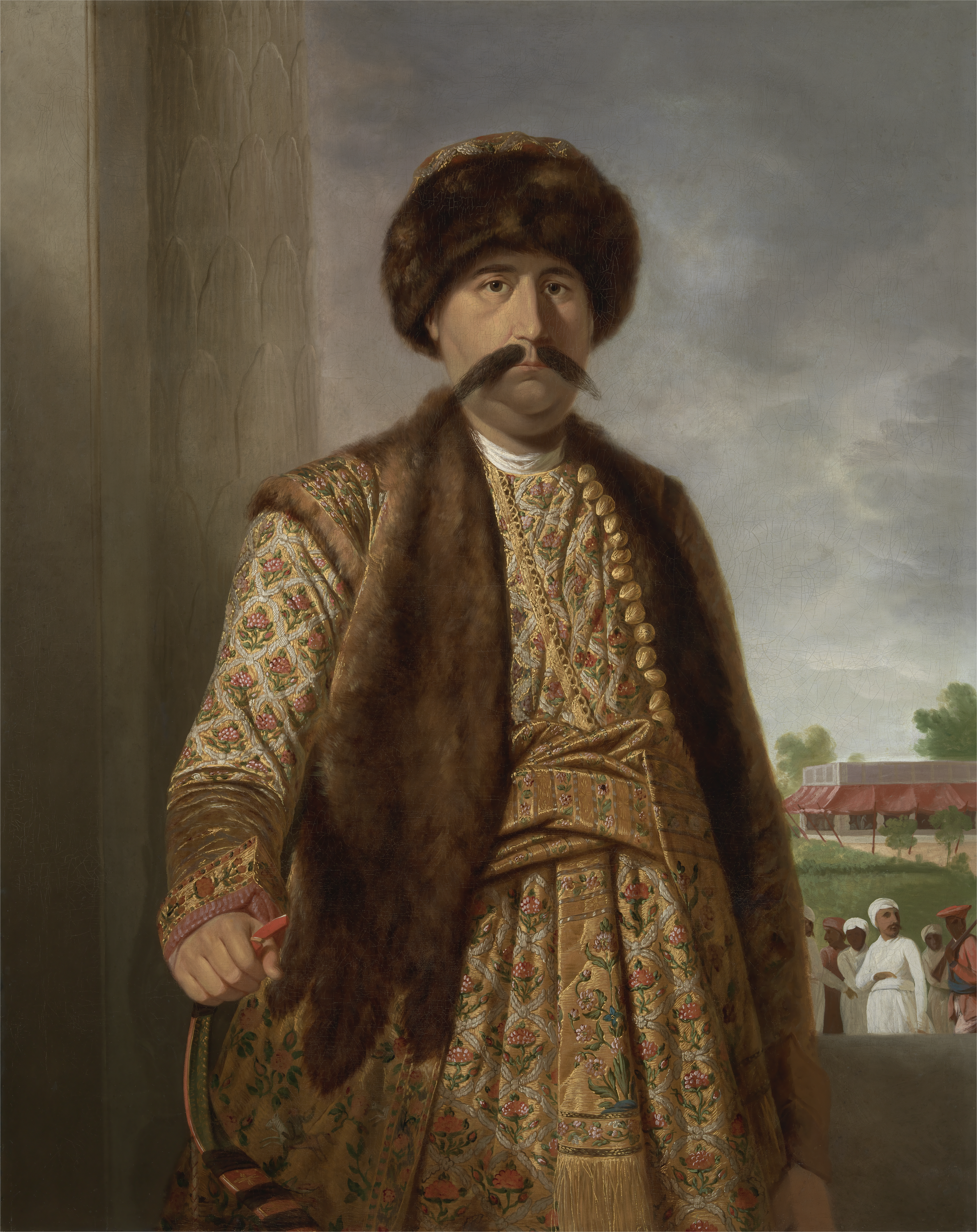
Shuja-ud-Daula fought the Maratha Confederacy during the Third Battle of Panipat on behalf of the Great Moghul, he's also known to have fought during the Battle of Buxar.

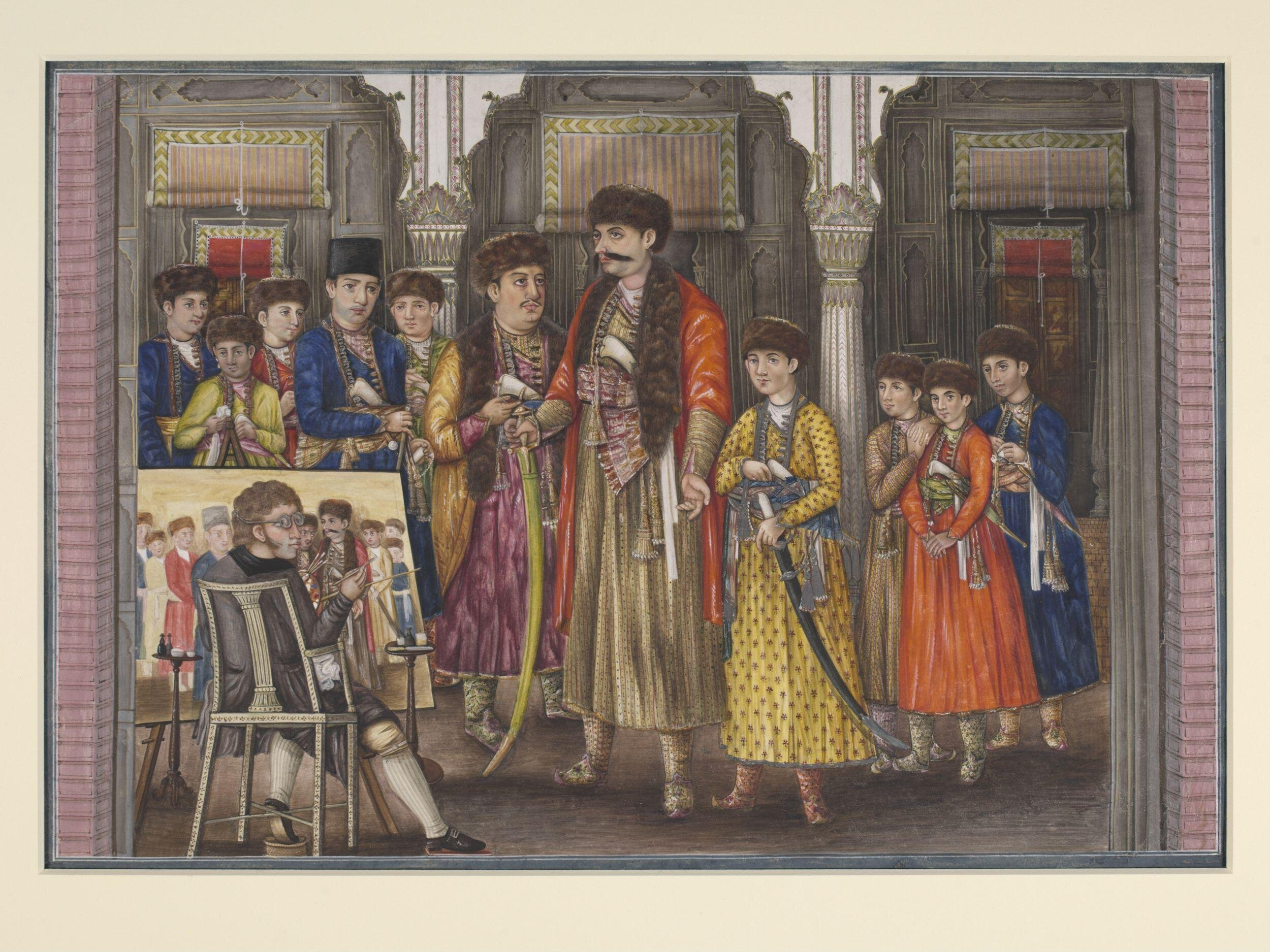
Shuja ud-Daula and his ten sons

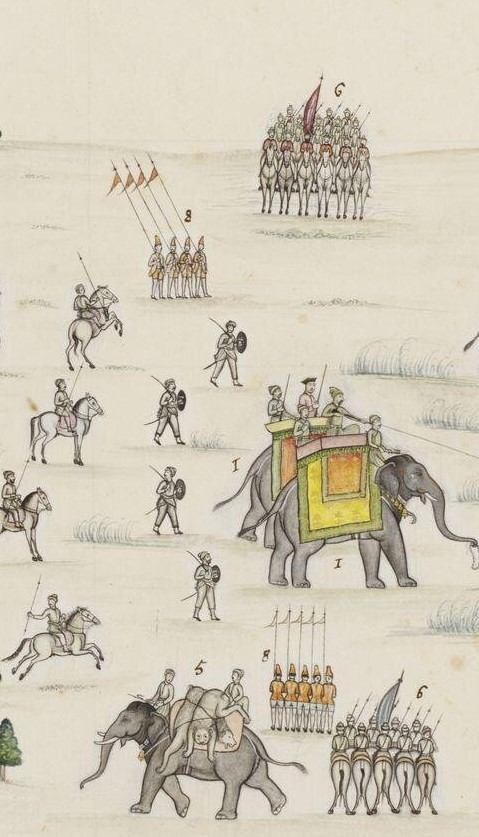
Shuja-ud-Daulah on a hunt

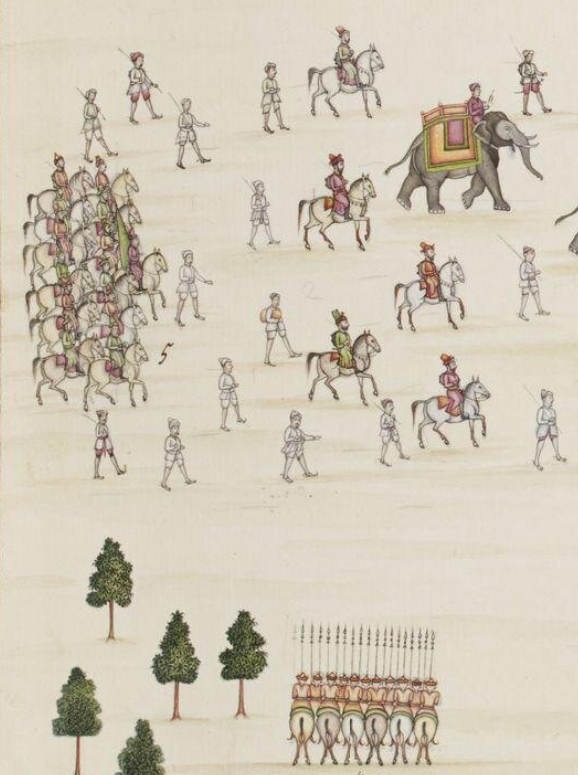
Shuja's army in Oudh

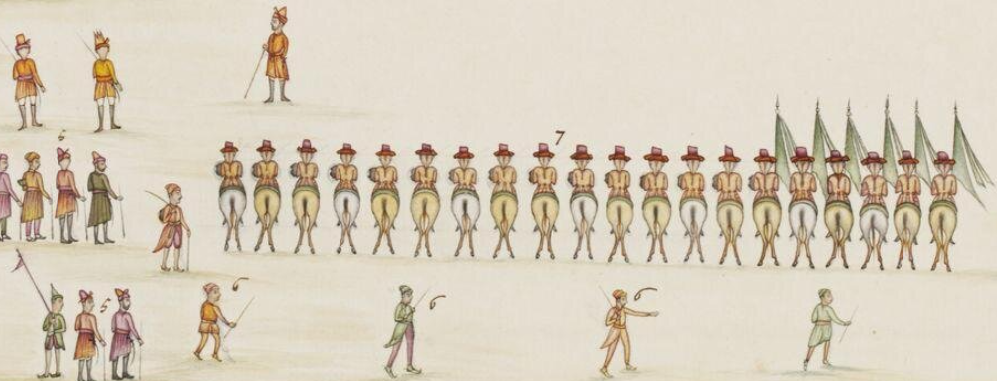
Oudh Cavalry

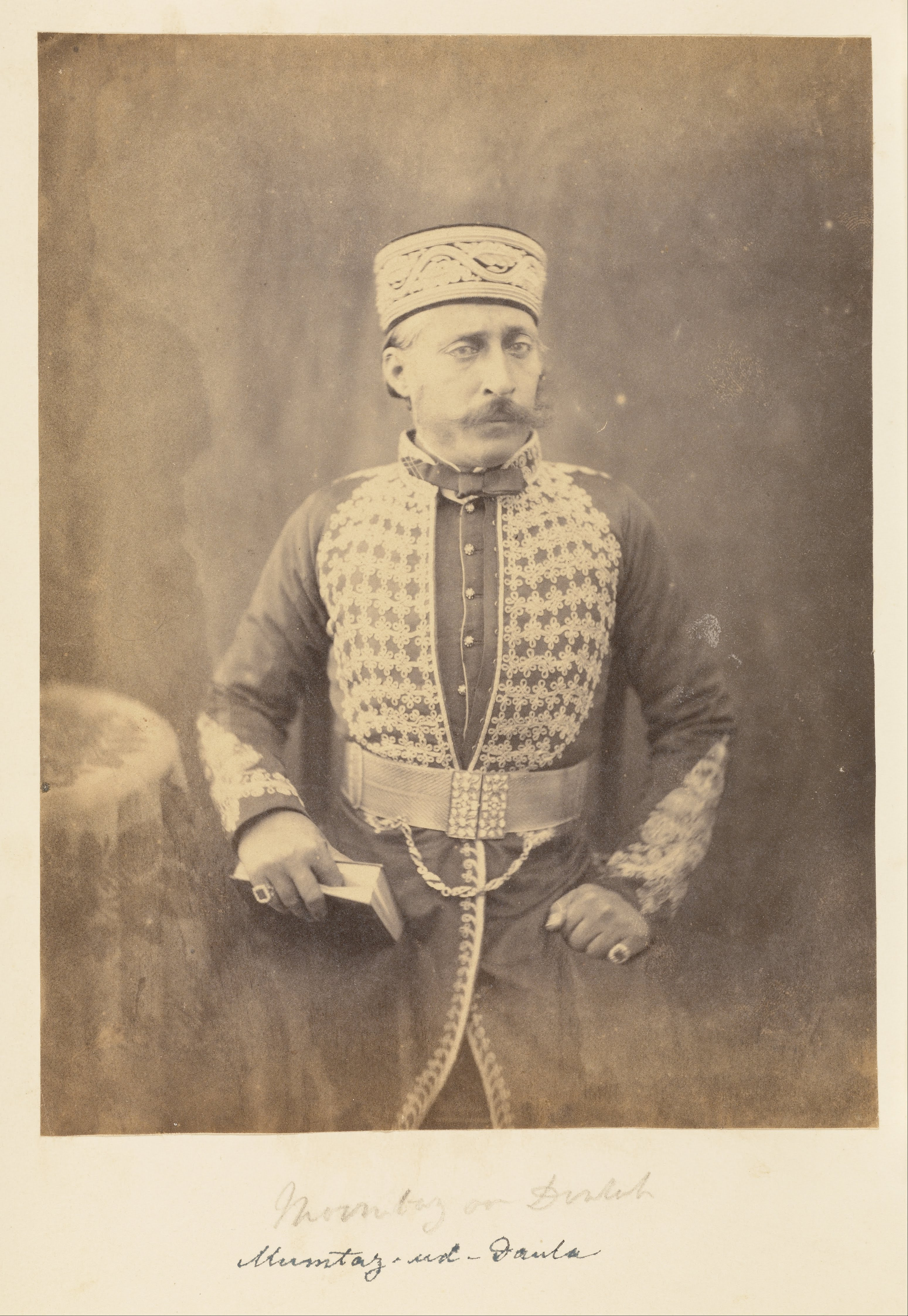
Mumtaz-ud-Daulah of the Budh Royal Family attributed to Felice Beato

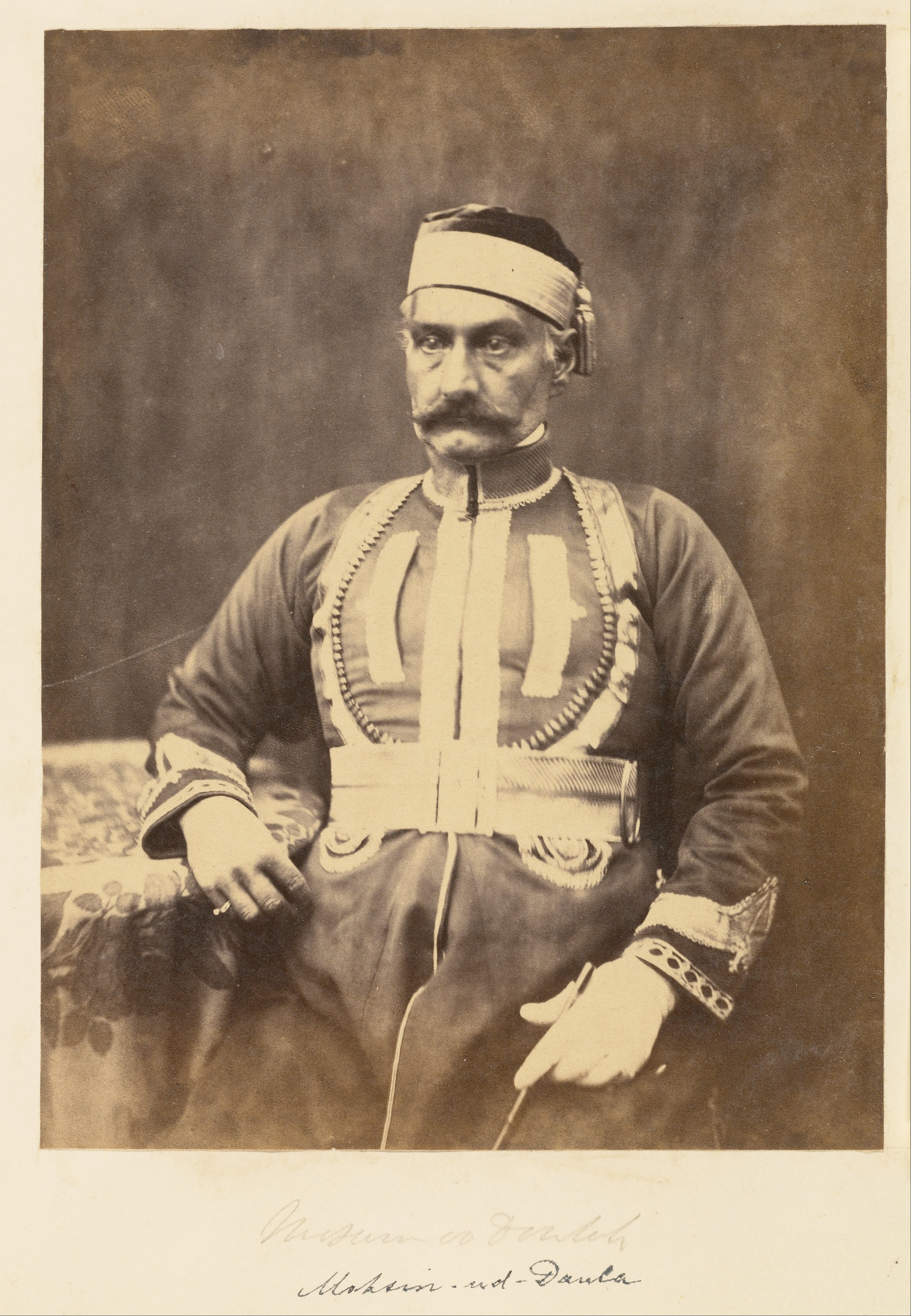
Moksim-ud-Daulah

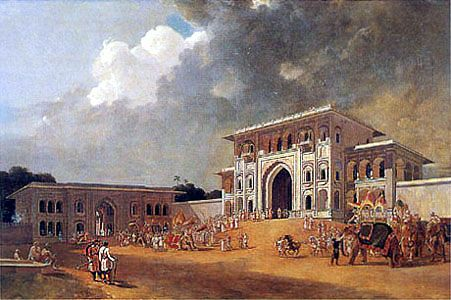
Gates of the Palace at Lucknow by W. Daniell, 1801.

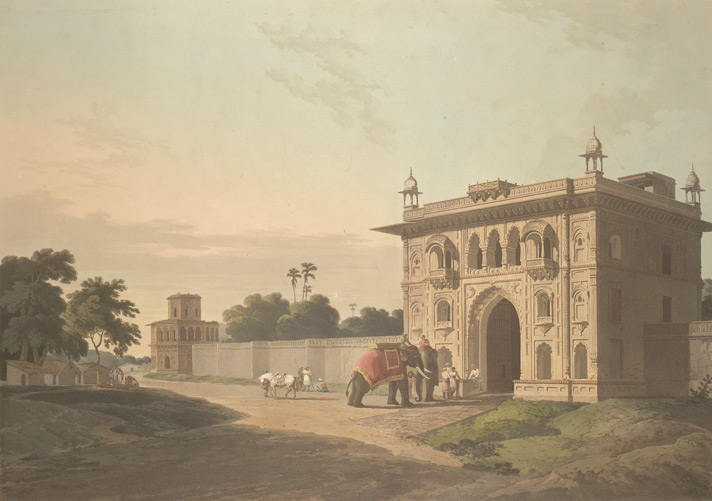
Gate of the Lal-Bagh fort at Faizabad in 1801.

== See also ==
- Begum Hazrat Mahal
- List of Shia dynasties
- The Chess Players (film)
