= Wajid Ali Shah =

Nawab of Awadh from 1847 to 1856

Nawab Wajid Ali Shah
- Mirza
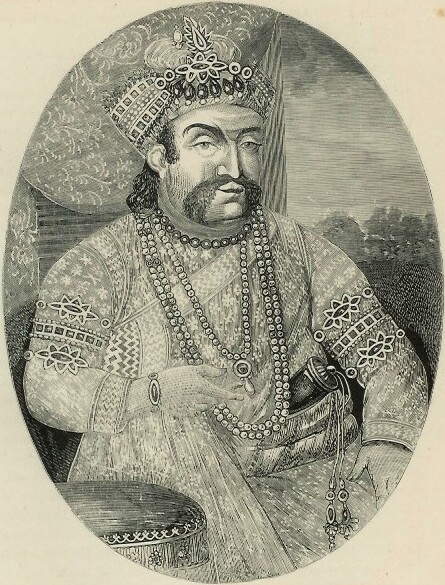

Nawab of Awadh
- Reign: 13 February 1847 – 11 February 1856
- Predecessor: Amjad Ali Shah
- Successor: Birjis Quadir (son)
- Born: 30 July 1822; Lucknow, Oudh State
- Died: 1 September 1887 (aged 65); Calcutta, Bengal Presidency, British India
- Spouses: Alam Ara; Begum Hazrat Mahal
Names
- Abul Mansoor Mirza Muhammad Wajid Ali Shah
- House: Nishapuri
- Dynasty: Qara Qoyunlu
- Father: Amjad Ali Shah
- Mother: Malika Kishwar Taj Ara Begum

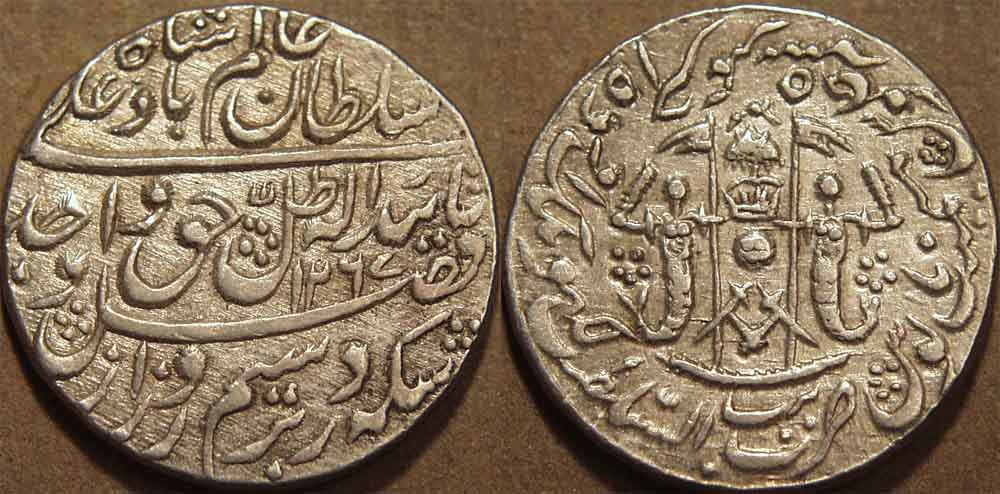
Silver Rupee of Wajid Ali Shah, struck at Lucknow in AH 1267 (1850–51 CE), showing the coat of arms of Awadh State on the reverse. The two figures holding the pennants are intended to be fish, seen also on the Awadh flag.

Mirza Wajid Ali Shah (Urdu: واجد علی شاه; 30 July 1822 – 1 September 1887) was the eleventh and last King of Awadh, holding the position for 9 years, from 13 February 1847 to 11 February 1856.

Wajid Ali Shah's first wife was Alam Ara who was better known as Khas Mahal (transl. : "special wife") because of her exquisite beauty. She was one of two Nikahi wives (a Nikah is the formal, legally binding Islamic marriage contract between a man and a woman, creating a lawful, mutually respectful partnership). His second wife, Muhammadi Khanum, better known as the Begum Hazrat Mahal, rose against the British East India Company during the Indian Rebellion of 1857 as the regent of Awadh.

His kingdom, long protected by the British East India Company (EIC) under a treaty, was annexed by the EIC on 11 February 1856, two days before the ninth anniversary of his coronation. The Nawab was exiled to Garden Reach in Metiabruz, then a suburb of Kolkata, where he lived out the rest of his life on a generous pension. He was a poet, playwright, dancer and great patron of the arts. He introduced Kathak, a major form of classical Indian dance as a court dance after the decline of Mughals for recreation activity.

== As king ==
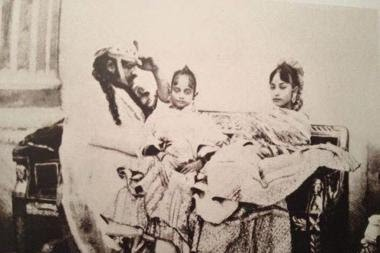
Wajid Ali and a wife and daughter. 1850.

Wajid Ali Shah succeeded the throne of Awadh when the kingdom was in decline. The British East India Company (EIC) had annexed much of the kingdom under its rule in a treaty signed with the Nawabs in 1801 and stymied the Awadh economy by imposing the costs of maintaining the Bengal Army on the kingdom's coffer, in addition to repeatedly demanding loans. However, the EIC refrained from annexing the remainder of the kingdom because they needed a buffer state between their territories to the east and south, and the Mughal Empire to the north.

Wajid Ali Shah ascended the throne of Oudh at a time when the East India Company was determined to annex the throne of the prosperous Awadh, which was "the garden, granary, and queen-province of India"- the royal predecessors and successors of Awadh were one of the major threats to the dominance of the Mughal Empire before the arrival of the East India Company to the Indian subcontinent.

When he became king he took keen interest in the administration of justice, introduced reforms, and reorganised the military. Wajid Ali Shah was widely regarded as a debauched and detached ruler. Some of his notoriety seems to have been misplaced. The British Resident of Lucknow, General William Sleeman, submitted a report highlighting "maladministration" and "lawlessness" he described as prevailing there. Sleeman himself was strictly opposed to outright annexation for a variety of reasons, including political, financial and ethical ones.

This provided the British with the official basis for their annexation. Later studies have suggested that Oudh was neither as bankrupt nor as lawless as the British had said, and that Oudh was for all practical purposes under British rule well before the annexation, with the Nawab playing little more than a titular role. The Bengal presidency army was recruited largely from Oudh; while, under direction by the Governor-General Lord Dalhousie in 1855, any tax revenue from Oudh not required for state government costs was appropriated by the East India Company.

In his book "Awadh Under Wajid Ali Shah", G.D. Bhatnagar gives the following assessment of this ill-starred prince:

Cast by providence for the role of an accomplished dilettante, he found himself a misfit for the high office to which he was elevated by chance. Wajid Ali Shah's character was complex. Though he was a man of pleasure, he was neither an unscrupulous knave nor a brainless libertine. He was a lovable and generous gentleman. He was a voluptuary, still he never touched wine, and though sunk in pleasure, he never missed his five daily prayers. It was the literary and artistic attainments of Wajid Ali Shah which distinguished him from his contemporaries.

— G.D. Bhatnagar, Awadh Under Wajid Ali Shah

== Patron of the arts ==
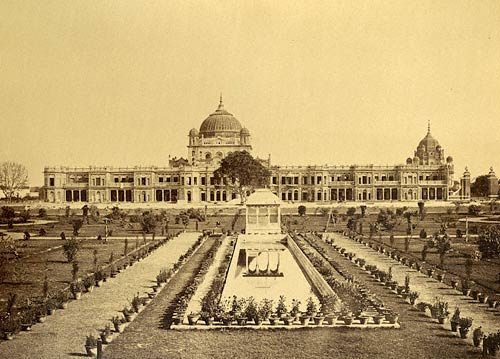
Qaisarbagh Complex of Lucknow, Uttar Pradesh, India (photograph taken between 1865 and 1882)

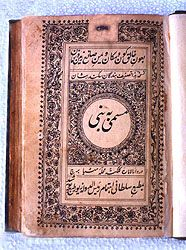
An illustration from the title page of Musammi Ba Banni written by Wajid Ali Shah, a book on Kathak dance lithographed at Matiabruz, Calcutta. in the manuscripts collection at the Portrait Gallery of Victoria memorial, Calcutta.

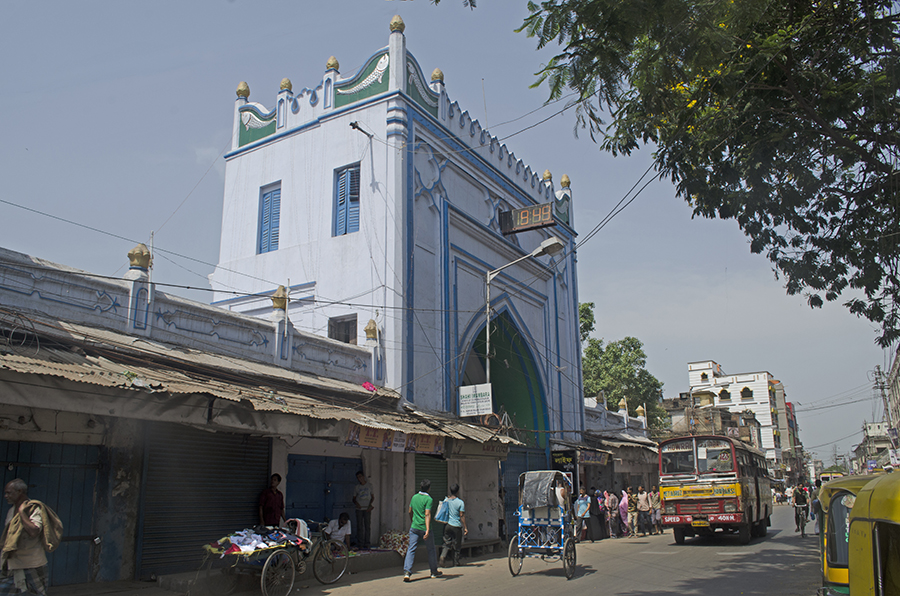
Gate of Sibtainbad Imambara, Metiabruz

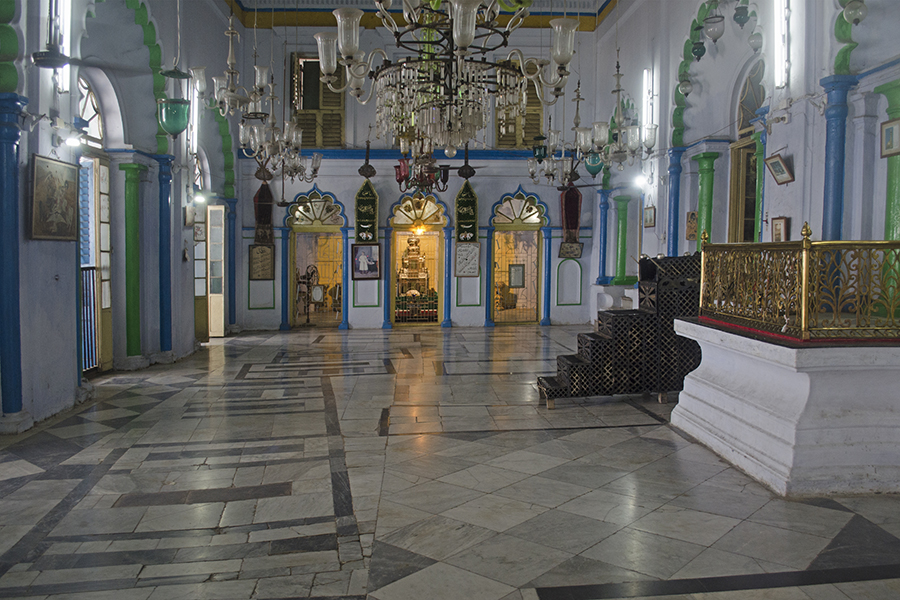
Inside the main hall of Sibtainbad Imambara, Metiabruz, West Bengal

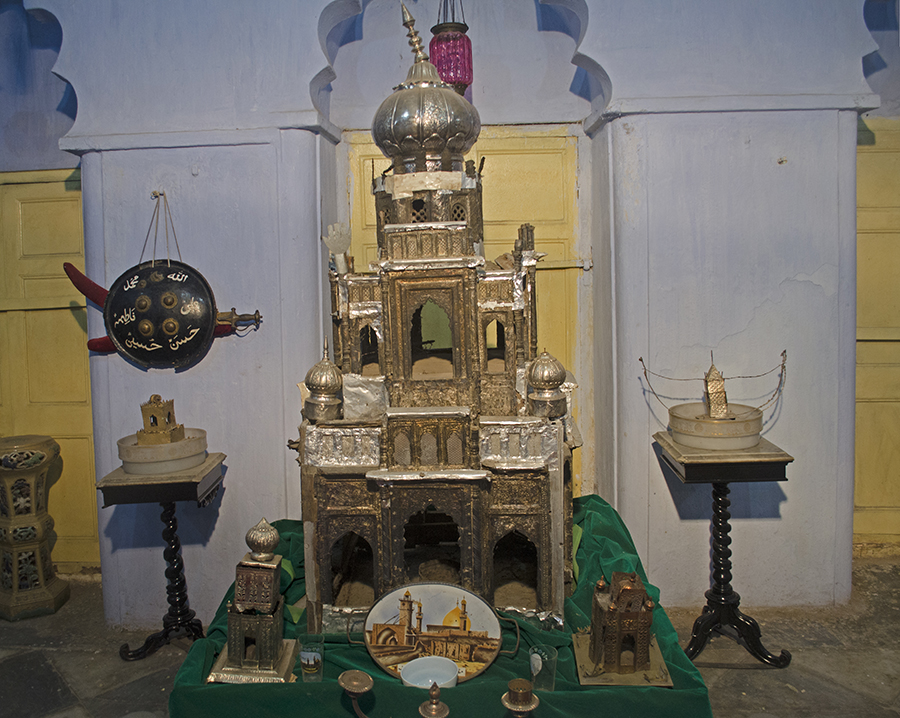
Grave of Wajid Ali Shah, Sibtainbad Imambara, Metiabruz in West Bengal

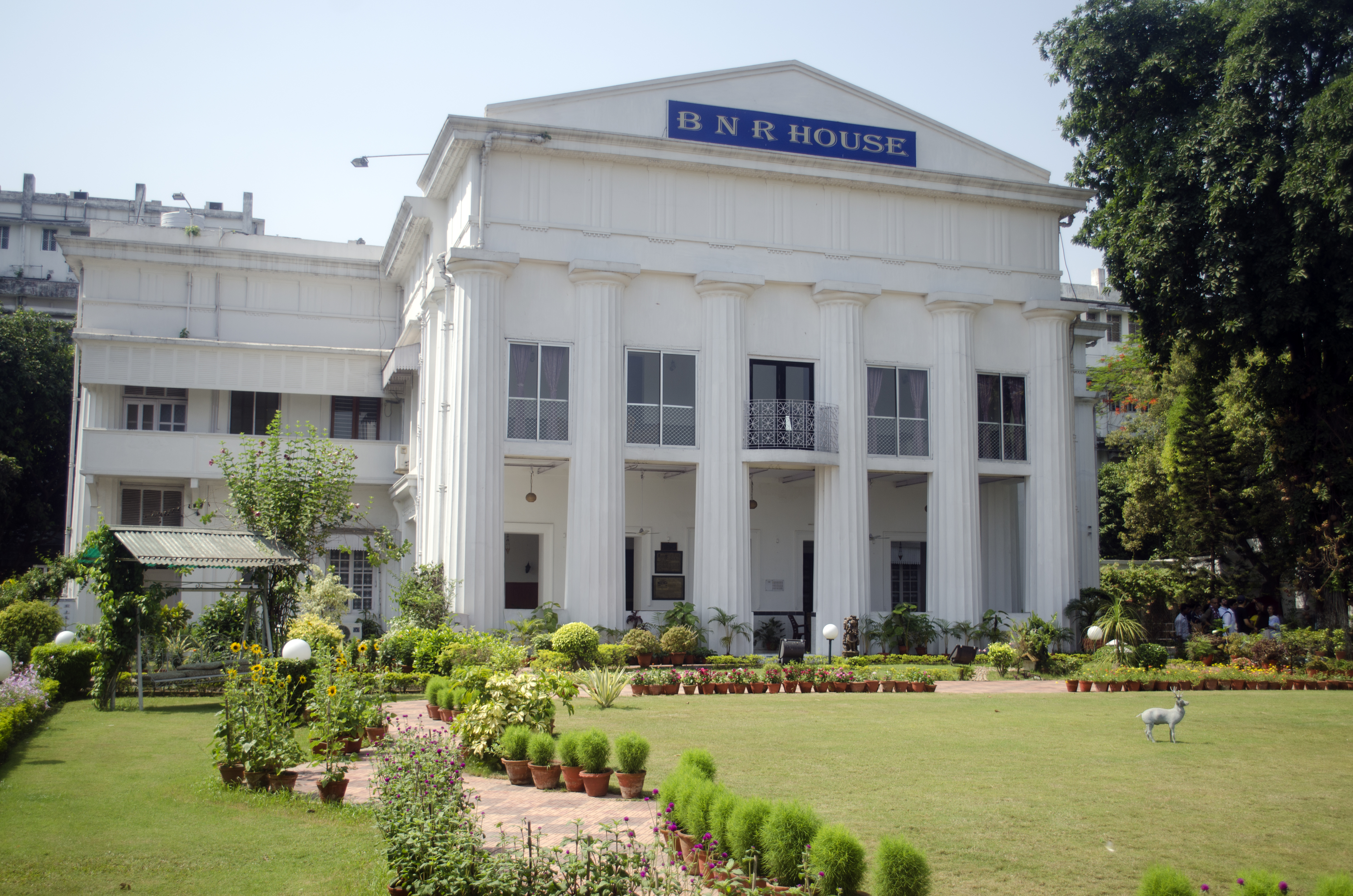
BNR House, residence of the GM of SER and former residence of Wajid Ali Shah

=== Contributions to music ===
A large number of composers who thrived under the lavish patronage of the Nawab rulers of Lucknow enriched the light classical form of thumri; the most prominent among these was Wajid Ali Shah. He was not only a munificent patron of music, dance, drama, and poetry but was also a gifted composer. He had received vocal training under great Ustads like Basit Khan, Pyar Khan and Jafar Khan. Pyar Khan, Jafar Khan and Basit Khan were the direct descendants of Mian Tansen and were the sons of famous Tanseni Chajju Khan.Bahadur Hussain Khan was the descendant of Tansen's son-in-law Naubat Khan, and was one of Wajid Ali Shah's favorite musicians, so much that the Nawab bestowed upon the singer the title Zia-ud-Daulah. Although Wajid Ali Shah's poetic takhallus was "Qaisar", he used the pseudonym "Akhtarpiya" for his musical compositions. Under this name, he wrote over forty works – poems, prose and thumris. The collections Diwan-i-Akhtar and Husn-i-Akhtar contain his ghazals. He is said to have composed many new ragas and named them Jogi, Juhi, Shah-Pasand, etc.

The source for much information on music in Nawabi Lucknow comes from the text Ma’danul Moosiqui ('The Mine of Music') of Hakim Mohammed Karam Imam, courtier of Wajid Ali Shah. During his time, complicated ragas like hori and dhrupad were ignored and easier raginis like tilak, pilu, sendura, khammach, bhairvi and jhanjhauti were encouraged. As these were liked by the king and easily understood by all sections of the society. They came to be well-loved by the commoners. Wajid Ali Shah has been accused of cheapening the classical tradition and promoting lighter forms of music such as ghazals and thumris. But then, as argued by scholars like Ravi Bhatt, this is how popular music has always been criticised. Popular belief has it that the light classical form, thumri was created by Wajid Ali Shah.

However, James Kippen argued that evidence suggests that thumri had almost certainly already become an independent vocal form somewhat influenced by khayal by 1800, becoming extremely popular and pervasive in the time of Wajid Ali Shah. Wajid Ali wrote and performed ghazals, and the modern-day style of ghazals was certainly evolved by his innovative ideas and experimentations in ghazals, some of which were noted for their inclusion of obscenities and sexually explicit references to his own private life.

=== Contributions to dance: Kathak ===
Not only music but dance also developed strongly in Lucknow and became a pre-eminent art under the patronage of Wajid Ali Shah. In the ancient times Kathak being the part of the temple ritual was performed at temples. With the change of time the Kathak performers in search of better prospects and rich patronage left the temple and entered into royal courts. The transformation was inevitable. The dance started adapting itself to the demands of the court, but it was under the artistic guidance and patronage of Nawab Wajid Ali Shah, that Kathak achieved greater dimensions.

He gave it a definite form, made it more artistic, and gave to it an aesthetic touch, he enriched it with rasa and bhava, and he added literature to it, lent it sensuality, and furnished it with grandeur and splendor to its presentation, argued Abdul Halim Sharar. During this period, Kathak was also extensively performed by tawaifs, who themselves developed the art in parallel to its refinement in court. They frequently performed on lighter classical music of such as dadra, kajri and tappa as well as thumri. Given the tawaifs' environment, their performance style of Kathak also differed from the court style, involving more of what in Kathak is termed nakhra (mischievous playfulness).

Wajid Ali Shah started two distinct forms one is Rahas and the other one is called Raas. He himself choreographed a dance based on the moves of Kathak called, Rahas, that he danced himself with the ladies of his court. For him, Rahas was a dramatic form of theatre including acting, dancing, and music and with different scenes the whole setting and locale changes. On the other hand, Raas was purely a religious form. Primarily Dhrupad was sung in Raas and the performance began with its singing. Raas was a circular form of dance where many gopis danced with one Krishna. Radhakamal Mukerjee in his book, The Lord of the Autumn Moons, says that the Raspancadhyayi or the five chapters pertaining to the circular group dance of Krishna with the Gopis, distill the embody the full maturity of the mystical emotions.

Kathak dance attained new heights of popularity and glory under his guidance and patronage. Thakur Prasadji was his Kathak guru, and the Kalka-Binda brothers performed in his court. What with the grand pageantry of the Rahas, Jogiya Jashan, Dance-dramas, and Kathak performances, Lucknow became the cultural centre where the most reputed musicians, dancers and poets of the time flourished. The greatest musicians, dancers and instrumentalists of the time enjoyed his patronage and hospitality. It was during his reign that Lucknow Gharana came into existence. It was in this period that the Lucknow Gharana of Kathak attained maturity, through the efforts of the stalwarts like Thakur Prasadji and others. The Lucknow style of Kathak dance is characterized by graceful movements, elegance and natural poise with dance. Abhinaya, concern for movement shape and creative improvisations are the hallmarks of this style. He not only made Kathak the official court dance, but using it in performances of rahas made it popular among the people.

=== Contributions to Hindustani theatre ===
When Wajid Ali Shah was a young boy, some astrologers warned his parents that he would become a Yogi, and advised them that the boy should be dressed up as a Yogi on each birthday of his so as to counteract the effect of the evil stars. He established the famous Parikhaana (abode of fairies) in which hundreds of beautiful and talented girls were taught music and dancing by expert-teachers engaged by the royal patron. These girls were known as Paris (fairies) with names such as Sultan pari, Mahrukh pari and so on. On each birthday, the Nawab would dress up as a Yogi with saffron robes, ash of pearls smeared on his face and body, necklaces of pearls around his neck, and a rosary in his hand, and walk pompously into the court with two of his 'paris dressed up as Jogans. Gradually he made it into a spectacular pageant or Mela known as Jogia Jashan, in which all citizens of Lucknow could participate, dressed as Yogis, irrespective of caste and creed. Later, when his favourite venue, the Qaisarbagh Baradari was built, he began to stage his magnificent Rahas (a Persianised name for Rasleela) full of sensuous poetry, his own lyrical compositions and glamorous Kathak dances.

Ranbir Singh gives details of Wajid Ali Shah's book entitled Bani in which the author mentions 36 types of Rahas all set in Kathak style (with colourful names like Mor-Chchatr, Ghunghat, Salami, Mor Pankhi and Mujra), and gives exhaustive notes about the costumes, jewellery, and stage- craft. Rahas, prepared at a fabulous cost of several lakhs (hundred thousands) of rupees, became very popular, and was performed at the Kaisarbagh-Rahas Manzil, (most probably the first Hindustani Theatre Hall). Many have regarded Wajid Ali Shah as "the first playwright of the Hindustani theatre", because his "Radha Kanhaiyya Ka Qissa" staged in the Rahas Manzil was the first play of its kind. It featured the Goddess Radha, Lord Krishna, several sakhis, and a Vidushaka-like character named "Ramchera". Songs, dances, mime, and drama were all delightfully synthesised in these Rahas performances. He dramatised many other poems such as Darya-i-Tashsq, Afsane-i-Isbaq, and Bhahar-i-Ulfat. It is said that Amanat's Inder Sabha was inspired by these dance-dramas, written, produced and staged by Nawab Wajid Ali Shah.

=== Contributions to literature ===
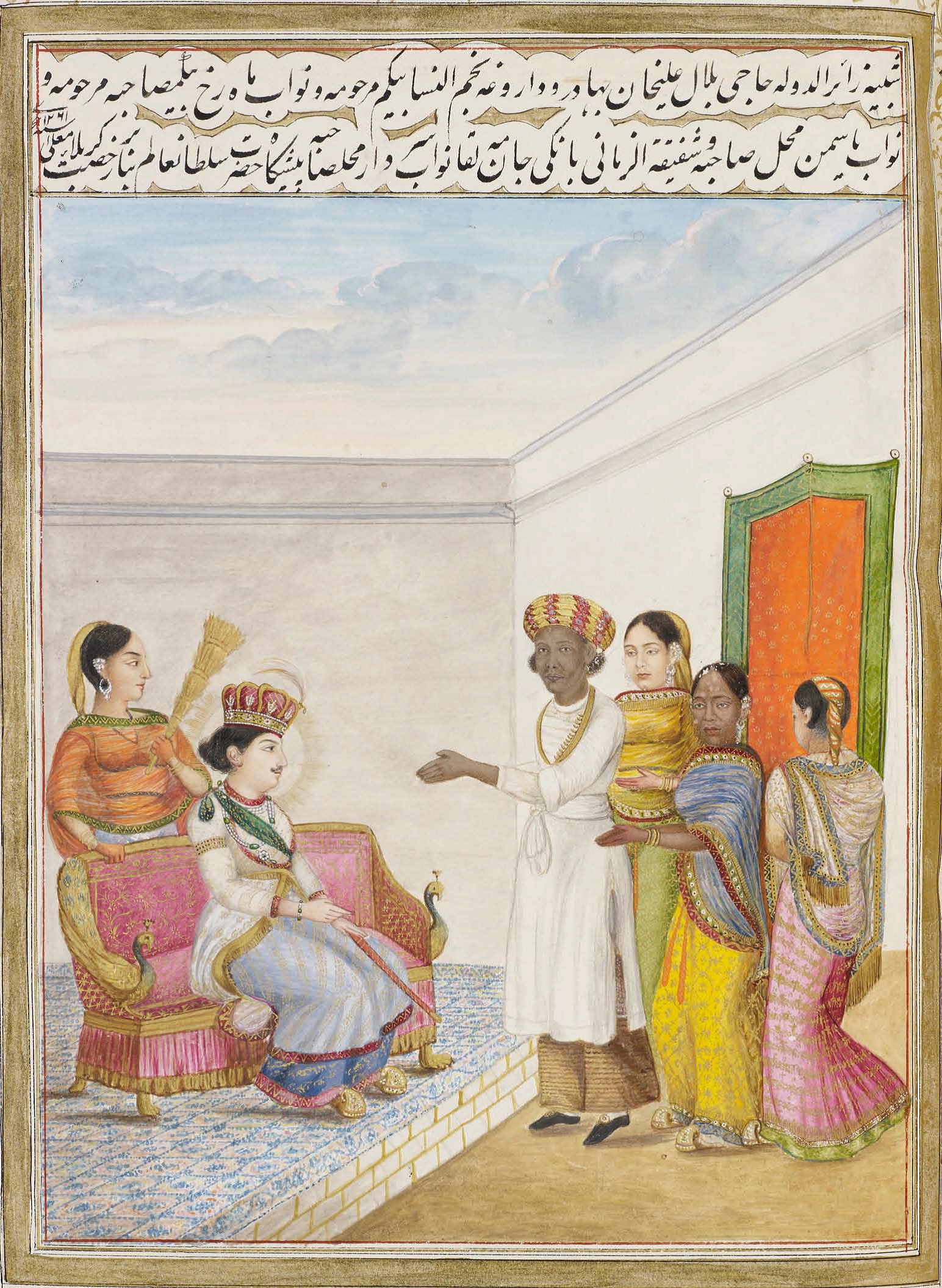
African eunuch (3rd from left) and African queen Yasmin (2nd from right) at the court of Wajid Ali Shah

Like the performing arts, Wajid Ali Shah also patronised literature and several poets and writers in his court. Notable among them were 'Barq', 'Ahmad Mirza Sabir', 'Mufti Munshi', and 'Aamir Ahmad Amir', who wrote books at the orders of Wajid Ali Shah, Irshad-us-Sultan and Hidayat-us-Sultan, Amanat the famous author of Indra Sabha and Bekhud wrote Jalwa-Akhatar, Hajjo Sharaf and Afsana-i-Lucknow have presented a picture of the times and life of Wajid Ali Shah. The famous poet Mirza Ghalib also received the gracious patronage of Wajid Ali Shah, who granted him a pension of Rupees five hundred per year in 1854.

Wajid Ali Shah used to write himself and was a poet of a considerable merit. He used to write under the nom-de-plume of ‘Akhtar’. He had equal command over Persian and Urdu and wrote several books in both languages. According to his court chronicler Masih-ud-Din he received a liberal western education and was well versed in ancient and modern history and literature. Garcin de Tassy, while travelling in the sub-continent during the mid-nineteenth century wrote in his journal about Wajid Ali Shah and noted, "I do not have to appreciate here this very political resolution, neither do I have to appreciate the qualities or defects of Wajid Ali Shah, as a sovereign, but I am interested in him as a distinguished scholar and as eminent poet in Hindustani".

Wajid Ali Shah wrote extensively and adopted a simple language that easily conveyed meaning to all. It showed sprinkling of Awadhi, the local dialect. He was a prolific writer. His work Sawat-ul-Qalub runs into 1061 pages and comprises a collection of 44,562 couplets, and was completed in a short span of three years.

==== Notable works ====
Abdul Lais Siddiqi in Lucknow Ka Dabistan-i-Shairi noted that it was common for kings to employ poets to write on their behalf but this was not true of Wajid Ali Shah, and every single word has been written by himself and no one else. One of his most important works is the autobiographical Huzn-i-Akhtar, which is in verse and contains nearly 1276 couplets. It is faithful records of the hazardous journey that he undertook from Lucknow to Calcutta, after having relinquished his crown. It speaks of the unkind and unceremonious treatment accorded to him by the British authorities. Vivid details of the people and the places he encountered on his journey. It also evokes his desperation at his arrest and subsequent deportment to Calcutta's Matiya Burj. Another important work of his is Bani which runs into 400 pages.

It is a treatise on Music and Dance, which offers details of the mushairas held at Matiya Burj, of the buildings raised there at his command. There are also descriptions of the animals at his personal zoo, besides vignettes of life and the time at Matiya Burj. Although it is estimated that he wrote over 60 books but most of his works are not available and hence no critical assessment of his writing has been made till date.

== Exile years ==
After losing the kingdom, the King first went to Kanpur and then progressed to Calcutta in a steamer accompanied by his close relatives and large entourage comprising musicians, nautch girls, cooks and animals from his menagerie and came ashore at Bichali Ghat near Metiabruz, Calcutta on 13 May 1856.

He had made up his mind to go and plead his case to Queen Victoria because of his firm belief in the British sense of justice. However, after the journey to Calcutta, he decided against the long voyage for health reasons, and it was his mother Malika Kishwar Taj Ara Begum, his brother Mirza Sikander Hashmat, and his eldest son and heir apparent who left for England. A year later when the Indian Rebellion of 1857 spread to Lucknow and rebelling sepoys installed one of his sons to the throne of Awadh, Wajid Ali Shah was imprisoned in Fort William by the British along with his Prime Minister, due to apprehensions that he would become a rallying figure for the sepoys.

HEA Cotton wrote that on Panic Sunday (14 June 1857), there was widespread apprehension among the European inhabitants of Kolkata because he had "one, two, three thousand" (no one knew) armed men under him. The suppression of the Indian Rebellion by the British Army dashed all his hopes of returning to Lucknow. After his release from Fort William, he was allotted a building called BNR House in Garden Reach near the headquarter of South Eastern Railway, Calcutta. In those days, it is said, it was called Parikhana.

However, heartbroken after leaving Lucknow, he had carried his dear city in his heart and proceeded to carve out a miniature of Lucknow in Metiabruz. In his exile in Metiabruz, he tried to keep the sweet memories of his Lucknow era alive by recreating the musical environments of his Kaisarbagh Baradari. The banished king had been "given" a number of fine houses with vast grounds stretching along the banks of the river Hooghly three to four miles south of Kolkata. Because of the presence there of an earthen dome (or raised platform), people would refer to it as Matiya Burj. The king spent lavishly out of his income of 12 lakhs (or, 1.2 million) rupees per annum and before long a "second Lucknow" arose in this area.

== Legacy: "Babul Mora" Thumri ==
His bhairavi thumri Babul Mora Naihar Chhooto Jaay has been sung by several prominent singers, but a particularly popular rendition remembered today was performed by Kundan Lal Saigal for the 1930s movie Street Singer.

बाबुल मोरा, नैहर छूटो ही जाए
بابُل مورا نیہر چھُوٹو ہی جائے
bābul morā naihar chhūṭo hī jāye
O My father! I'm leaving home.
चार कहार मिल, मोरी डोलिया उठायें
چار کہار مِل موری ڈولِیا اُٹھایّں
chār kahār mil, morī ḍoliyā uṭhāeṃ
The four bearers lift my palanquin.
मोरा अपना बेगाना छूटो जाए
مورا اپنا بیگانو چھوٹو جائے
morā apnā bigānā chhūṭo jāye.
I am leaving those who were my own.
अंगना तो पर्बत भयो और देहरी भयी बिदेस
آنگن تو پربت بھئیو اور ڈیری بھئی بدیش
āngan to parbat bhayo aur dehrī bhayī bidesh
Your courtyard is now like a mountain, and the threshold, a foreign country.
जाए बाबुल घर आपनो मैं चली पिया के देस
جائے بابل گھر آپنوں میں چلی پیا کے دیس
jāye bābul ghar āpnoṃ meṃ chalī pīyā ke desh
I leave your house, father, I am going to my beloved.

== In popular culture ==
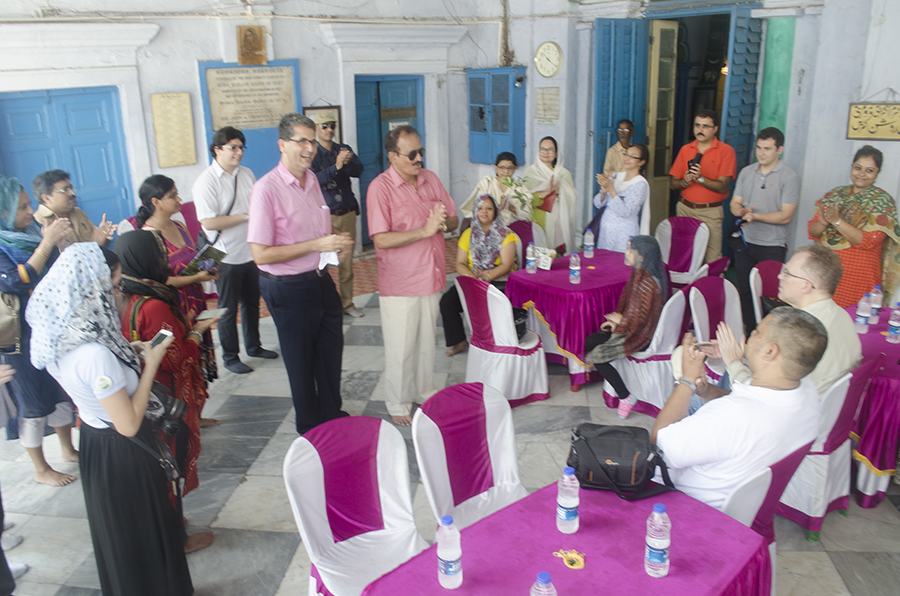
ITC Sonar Tour participants inside the Sibtainbad Imambara, Metiabruz

- In Satyajit Ray's Shatranj Ke Khilari, Wajid Ali Shah is shown as a very enthusiastic patron of dance and music. The role was played by Amjad Khan.
- Muzaffar Ali made an Indian television series, Jaan e Alam, about Wajid Ali Shah and his queen. Ali played the role of Shah himself while Zarina Wahab essayed the role of his wife.
- In a 53-episode Indian TV historical drama Bharat Ek Khoj, Aanjjan Srivastav plays the role of Wajid Ali Shah in episodes 42.

== See also ==
- Begum Hazrat Mahal
- Oudh State
- Oudh Bequest

Preceded by Naser ad-Dowla Amjad 'Ali Thorayya Jah Shah	Padshah-e-Oudh, Shah-e Zaman; 13 Feb 1847 – 7 Feb 1856	Succeeded by Berjis Qadr (in rebellion)
