= Malika Kishwar =

Queen of Awadh (1803–1858)

- Janab-i-Alia
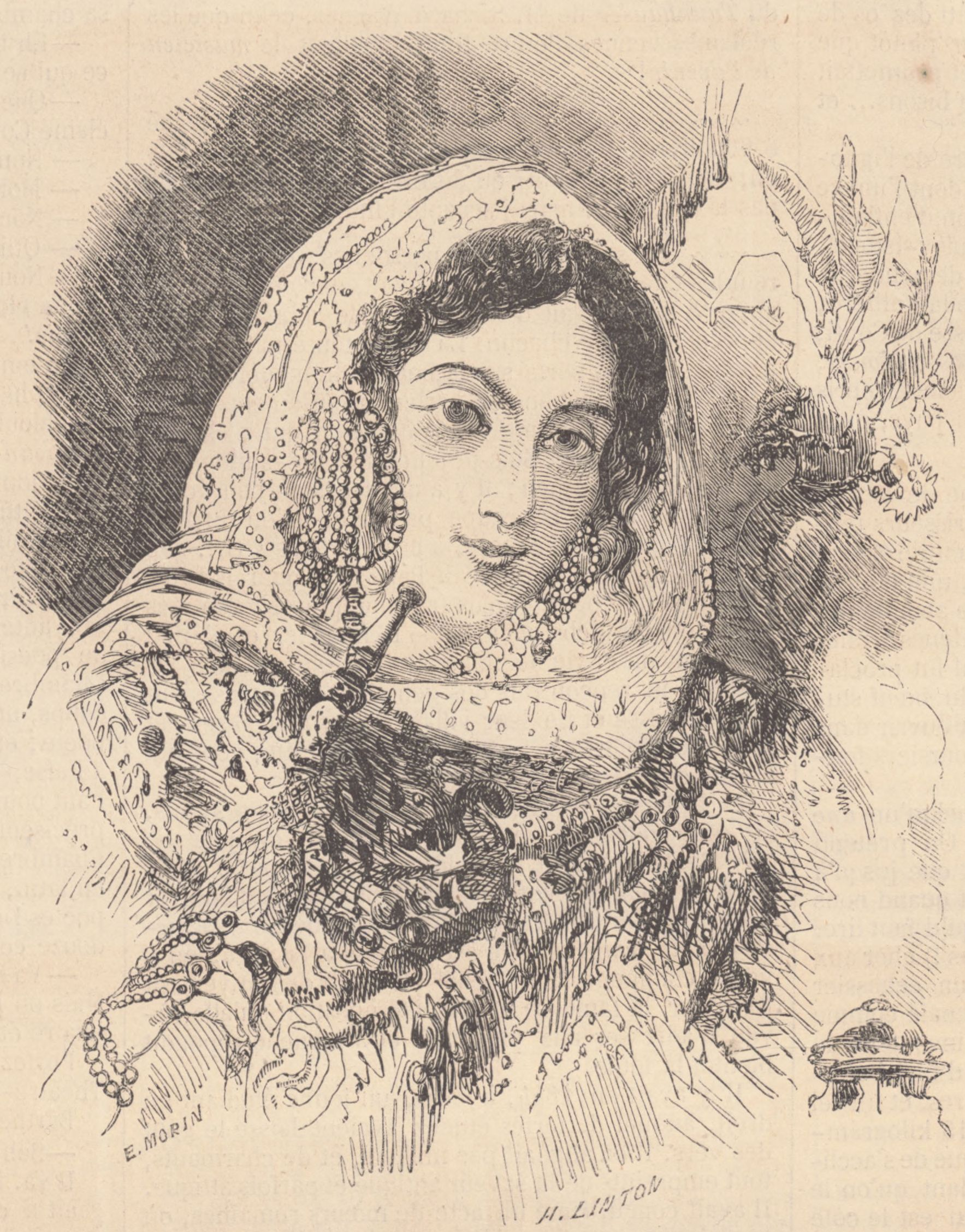
- Portrait in Le Monde Illustré in 1858
- Born: 1803; Lucknow, Kingdom of Awadh
- Died: 24 January 1858 (aged 54–55); Paris, France
- Burial: Pere Lachaise Cemetery, Paris, France
- Spouse: Amjad Ali Shah
- Issue: Wajid Ali Shah; Sikandar Hashmat; Hamid Ali; Birjis Qadr; Rifat Ara Begum; Omdutel Ara Begum
Regnal name
- Malika Kishwar Taj Ara Begum

Malika Kishwar Bahadur Fakr-ul-Zamani Nawab Taj Ara Begum (1803 – 24 January 1858), also known as Janab-i-Alia, was Queen Mother of the last king of Awadh in northern India. The chief consort of the tenth nawab of Awadh, Amjad Ali Shah, her son Wajid Ali Shah succeeded his father when she was widowed in 1847. When British officials announced their intent to annex the Kingdom of Oudh, she met with General James Outram in Lucknow to plead their case. In 1856, she travelled to England with one of her sons and grandson and met with Queen Victoria in 1857. After the intervention of France, she was given permission to leave England, but died three days after arriving in Paris. She is buried in a grave at Père Lachaise Cemetery.

== Early life and marriage ==
Malika Kishwar Taj Ara Begum was born in Lucknow in 1803. She was a descendant of Mughal court poet and minister Abdul Rahim Khan-i-Khanan of Delhi. Her father was Hasin-ud-din Khan of Kalpi. Her mother was Vilayati Begum, a daughter of the sixth Nawab of Awadh, Saadat Ali Khan. Well-educated, Malika Kishwar could read and write Persian and Arabic, and prioritised the education of her children and other dependents.

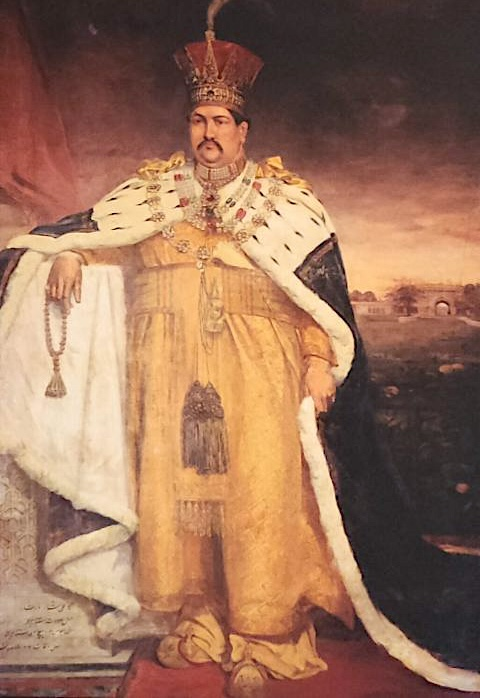
Amjad Ali Shah, King of Oudh

Malika Kishwar married Amjad Ali Shah during the reign of Ghazi-ud-Din Haidar, the seventh Nawab and first king of Oudh. Her husband became the tenth nawab and fourth king of Awadh, from 1842 to 1847. He was the most religiously devout of the Shia Muslim nawabs, and as chief consort, she did not have a role in political matters during her husband's reign.

Deeply religious herself, Malika Kishwar remained in purdah all her life, surrounded by women and served by female servants and eunuchs within the royal enclosures and gardens of Lucknow before the fall of the kingdom. She preferred to hire servants of the Shia faith, and refused the service of maids who had been brought to her palace against their will. According to historian K. S. Santha, she was the only queen of Awadh to host female durbars. Malika Kishwar welcomed women of all backgrounds and listened to their grievances, and received their petitions and gifts.

Her children with Amjad Ali Shah included his successor Wajid Ali Shah, his younger brother Sikandar Hashmat Bahadur, and at least one daughter. She was said to have been closest to her son Sikandar Hashmat. The king had two more sons including his eldest, Mustafa Ali Khan, with a concubine, and his youngest son Sulaiman Qadr. Like royal wives before her, Malika Kishwar struggled to accept her husband's relationships with other women, including his affair with a maidservant and his marriage in November 1846 to a grocer's teenage daughter who received the title Sultan Mahal.

Malika Kishwar was widowed in her mid-forties. Following the death of Amjad Ali Shah in 1847, she spent many hours reading the Quran, and rejected physical comforts such as sleeping in a bed.

== Reign and overthrow of son ==
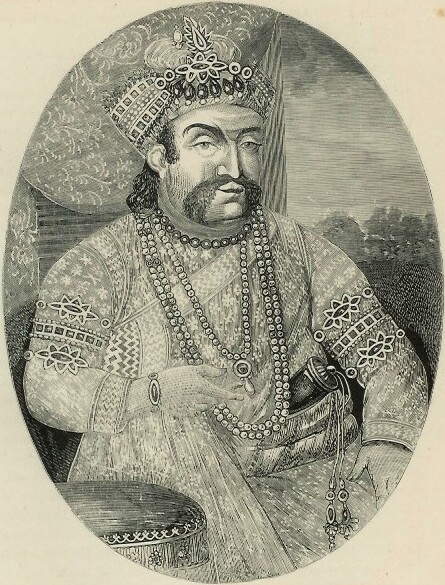
Portrait of Wajid Ali Shah

On 13 February 1847, Malika Kishwar's son Wajid Ali Shah became the eleventh nawab and fifth king of Awadh at the age of 25. He began to consult his mother in political matters such as appointing high-ranking officials. She helped him navigate court intrigue, advising him to marry the daughter of minister Ali Naqi Khan whom she did not trust.

Disapproving of her son's licentious behaviour, she famously convinced him to divorce eight of his mut'ah wives, citing local Hindu tradition which considered the snake mark on their bodies to be bad luck. They included Begum Hazrat Mahal, whom Malika Kishwar disliked. While some of the wives later returned to the zenana or inner quarters after performing a ceremony to negate their bad luck, others including Hazrat Mahal refused and remained estranged.

Although British officials complained about Malika Kishwar's "interference", Colonel William Sleeman, the British resident in the royal court, recommended that she be consulted in nominating members of a Regency Council of Awadh, in the event that Wajid Ali Shah suddenly died.

=== Annexation of Awadh ===
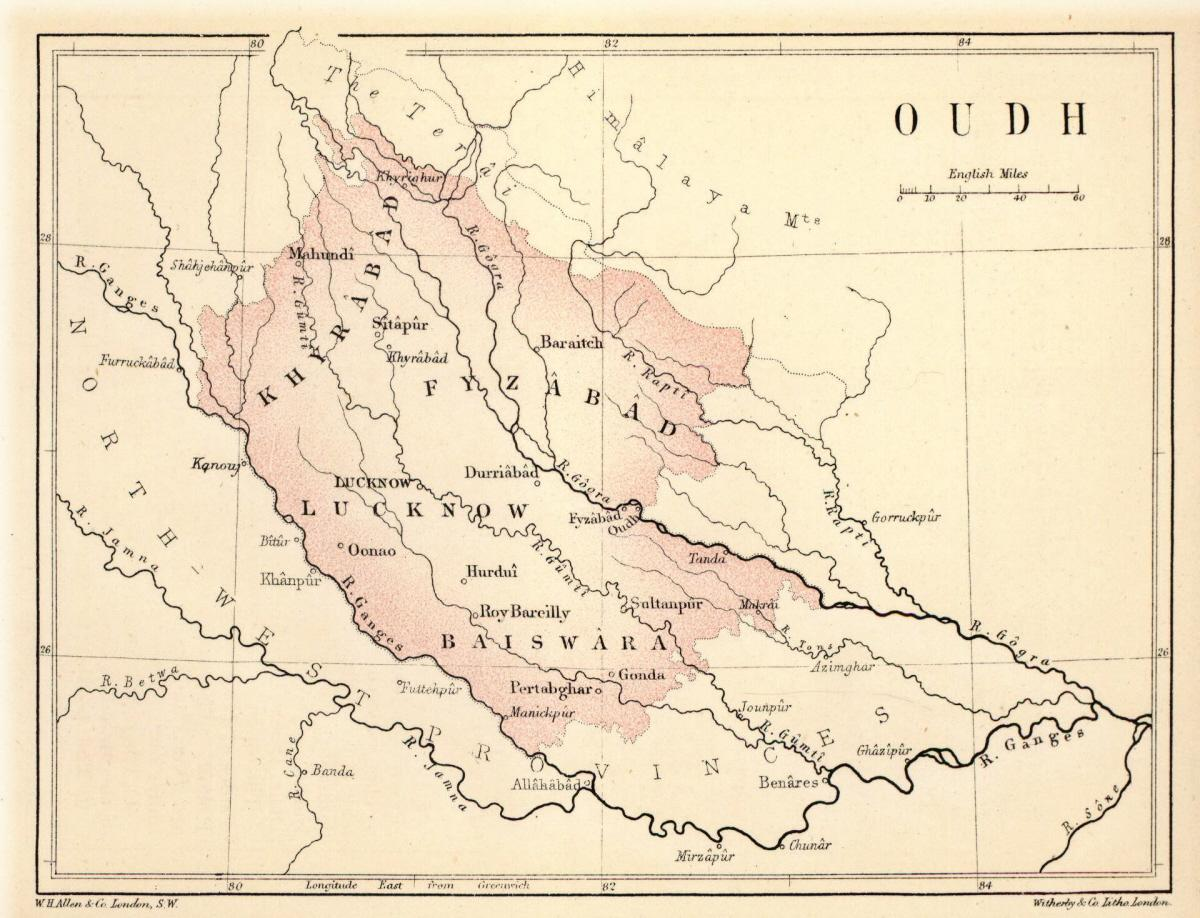
Oudh in 1856

At the end of January 1856, British military forces proceeded from Cawnpore to Lucknow as General James Outram sought to carry out the annexation of Awadh. The decision had been made by the Governor-General of India, Lord Dalhousie, with the backing of the Court of Directors of the East India Company and the British government. Lacking sufficient military strength to oppose the 12,000 British troops advancing toward the capital, King Wajid Ali Shah ordered his army to stand down.

General Outram accepted Malika Kishwar's request for an interview on 1 February 1856, speaking to her through a curtain and an interpreter, in an attempt to persuade her to convince her son to sign the annexation treaty. She, in turn, tried unsuccessfully to plead the case for remaining an independent British protectorate. On 4 February 1856, Outram had an audience with Wajid Ali Shah and was met with indignation. The king refused to abdicate. Three days later, Outram issued a proclamation deposing the king and taking over administration of the state on behalf of the East India Company.

On 13 March 1856, the deposed king and his family left Lucknow for Cawnpore, arriving in Calcutta two months later. Historian Rosie Llewellyn-Jones suggests that Malika Kishwar likely urged her son to make the difficult journey to Calcutta, despite being discouraged by British authorities to do so. While in Calcutta, Wajid Ali Shah appointed his friend Captain Robert Wilberforce Bird, a former assistant resident at court in Awadh with family ties to the East India Company, to travel to London to lobby members of Parliament, the company's court of directors, and the British press on his behalf. When Malika Kishwar learned that Bird had demanded an advance of £17,000, she barred Bird from seeing the king, insisting that he would not sign the money transfer and instead offering to send him a smaller sum of money via intermediaries. Bird openly expressed his anger and departed for England.

== Mission to England ==
=== Journey from Calcutta ===
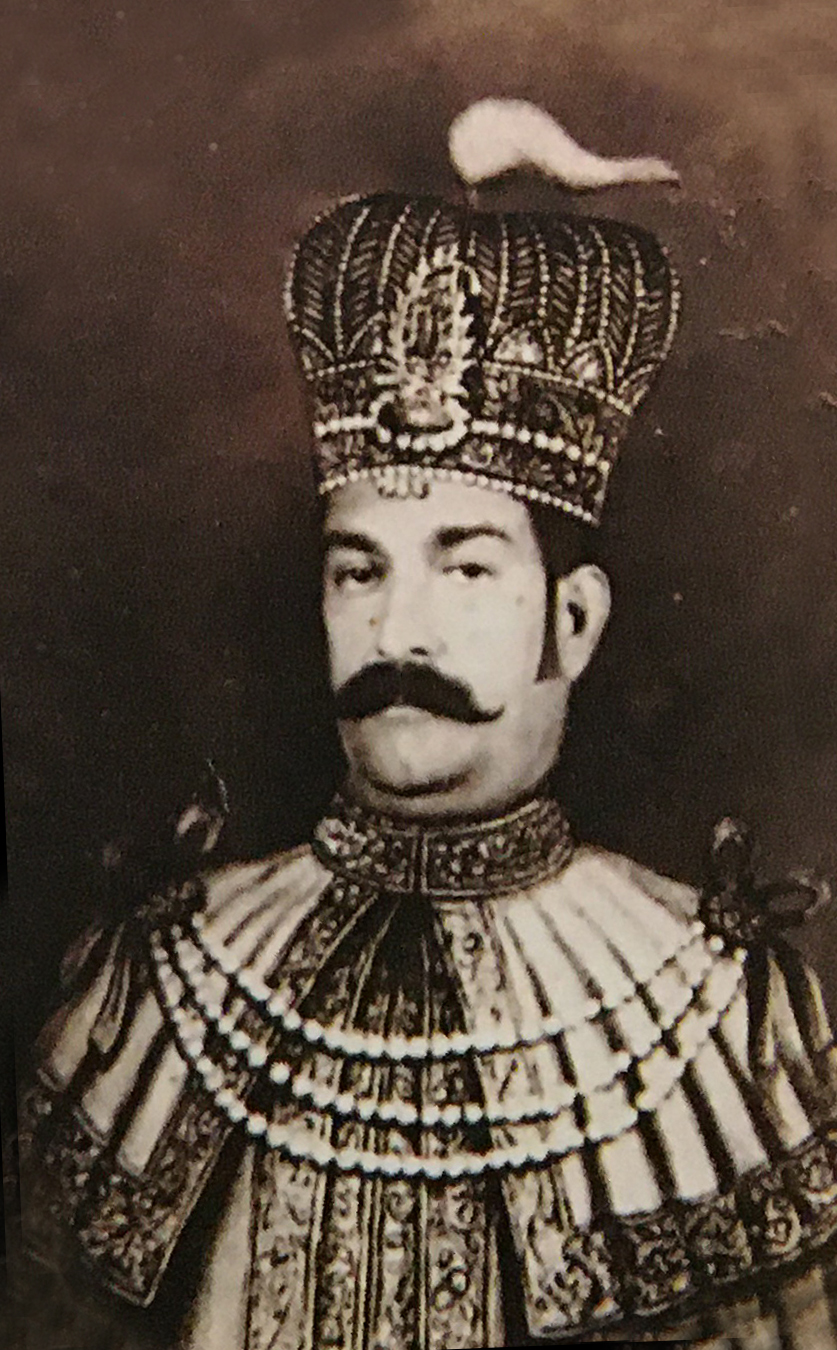
General Mirza Sikandar Hashmat Bahadur

On 15 June 1856, the Governor General of India learned that Malika Kishwar had secretly left Calcutta at night with her son Sikandar Hashmat, the former commander-in-chief of Awadh, and her grandson Prince Hamid Ali, the heir apparent. The royal party was on a mission to England to see Queen Victoria and petition for the reinstatement of Wajid Ali Shah as ruler of Awadh. Accompanying them were Mary Ann and John Rose Brandon, a former gardener at the royal palace in Awadh, who had helped Wajid Ali Shah, his family, servants and courtiers to leave Lucknow for Cawnpore two months prior via horse-drawn carriages. Wajid Ali Shah had originally planned to make the journey to England himself, but had decided to remain in Calcutta. The official reason given was that he was too unwell to travel such a long distance. Historian Llewellyn-Jones suggests that there were also diplomatic reasons behind his decision to send his mother in his place, including avoiding a loss of face if restoration of the kingdom were refused by the British.

The group, including an estimated 70 staff, had private use of a steamer which took them down river to board the SS Bengal, which transported them to the port of Suez. While disembarking in Suez, a eunuch who had been entrusted with a case containing jewels worth £50,000, including a necklace intended as a gift for Queen Victoria, somehow let it slip into the Red Sea. Divers were hired to search for the jewels to no avail. According to K. S. Santha, it was regarded as a deliberate theft. From Suez, they travelled overland on closed carriages to the Mediterranean Sea. From Alexandria, they were transported on the Peninsular and Oriental Company steamship SS Indus, arriving in Malta on 10 August and finally in Southampton on 20 August 1856.

=== Arrival in Southampton ===
Crowds of people gathered near the dock at Southampton for the highly anticipated arrival of the royal party of Awadh (spelled by the British as "Oude"). The question of how to shield Malika Kishwar from public view posed logistical challenges, but in the end she was carried, veiled, in a sedan chair. The entourage headed directly to the Royal York Hotel, which they took over for ten days.

Curious members of the public crowded the high street near their hotel, leading The Globe to comment that "it is one thing to show hospitality to ladies and gentlemen in distress, and another to convert them into a spectacle". On 23 August 1856, the Princes held an afternoon levee. Among the guests received by the royal family that day were "the mayor, an earl, a countess, three ladies, two baronets, and an admiral". According to The Globe, the mayor of Southampton Richard Andrews shook hands with a female hand through a curtain, thought to be that of the Queen of Oudh.

Following the Princes' levee, about 30 ladies of Southampton were presented to the Queen Dowager of Oudh. The Illustrated London News reported that the Queen sat on a sofa attended by eight ladies, "dressed in splendid shawls", with her hair "cut rather short, and brushed back over the head à la Chinoise", and with "two massive earrings" but no other jewellry around her head. Mary Ann Brandon was the interpreter.

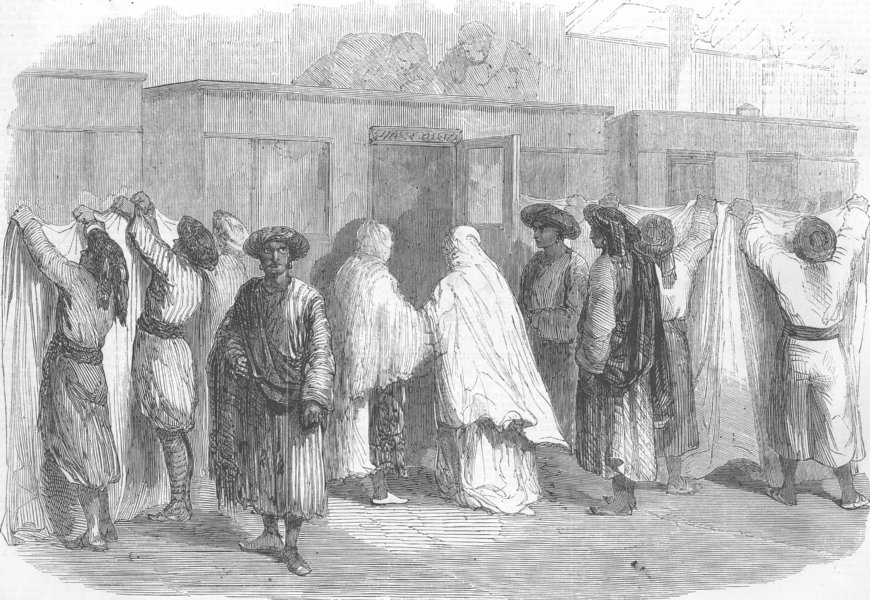
"Departure of the Queen and Royal family of Oude from Southampton" in The Illustrated London News (6 September 1856)

On 30 August 1856, the royal entourage of 110 people departed Southampton for London on specially reserved train carriages. As they took horse-drawn carriages to the station, their servants waved back at the crowds which once again lined the streets. At Southampton Terminus station, which the stationmaster had refused to close to the general public, the eunuchs stood guard while servants held up calico sheets, forming a corridor through which Malika Kishwar could alight from the closed carriage to cross the platform and board the train unseen.

=== Residence in London ===
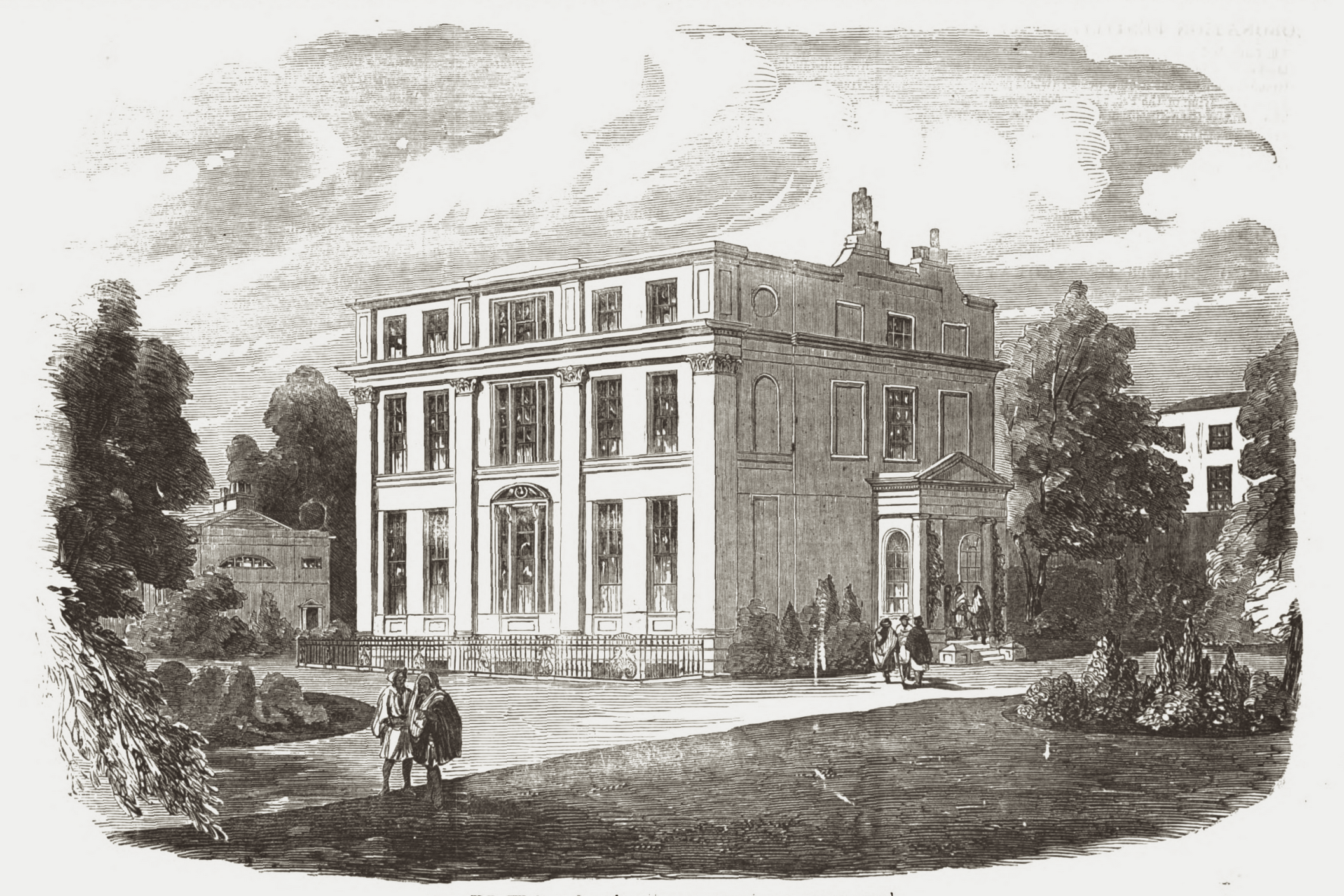
Harley House, "Residence of the Queen of Oude" in The Illustrated London News (11 October 1856)

After arriving at Waterloo station in London on 30 August 1856, Malika Kishwar and the royal entourage of took up residence at Harley House in Marylebone. The free-standing house was on the north side of Marylebone Road, enclosed by a brick wall with a side entrance to Regent's Park. It was rented for them by John Rose Brandon for £550 a year. One of the most senior officials accompanying the royal party was the king's legal representative Maulvi Masih-uh-din Khan, a former employee of the East India Company, fluent in English, Persian, and Urdu. In total, there were more than 100 staff including the king's aide-de-camp; the queen mother's chief of household staff, chief eunuch, and medical advisor; the heir apparent's bodyguards, medical advisor, and tutor; the general's own staff; and many other servants.

The royal party's audience with Queen Victoria did not take place until more than ten months later. Arranging the meeting was complicated for political and diplomatic reasons. Malika Kishwar had hoped that by speaking to Queen Victoria directly, she would be able to persuade her to restore the kingdom of Awadh. She was devastated to learn after arriving in England that Queen Victoria had no such power. She requested an interview with Robert Vernon Smith, Member of Parliament and President of the Board of Control, who turned down the request. Behind the scenes, Vernon Smith had sought to send Sir George Clark, former Governor of Bombay, to see her as a gesture of respect, but the Court of Directors of the East India Company was against it. The law firm of Gregory, Gregory, Skirrow & Rowcliffe were hired as "Parliamentary agents" on behalf of the royal family of Awadh, but progress in filing an appeal to the British Parliament was slow. In the meantime, Wajid Ali Shah was struggling to pay the costs they were incurring in London and in exile in Calcutta. In response to a petition from Wajid Ali Shah on 10 December 1856, the Court of Directors of the East India Company offered the former king a pension of 12 lakhs per year (£120,000). Vernon Smith wrote to Charles Canning, the Governor-General of India, that he thought it was a very generous offer that should not be interpreted as a concession to the royals' demands for reinstatement, and that Queen Victoria herself was "most anxious [Wajid Ali Shah] should be more liberally treated and I think it good policy, if we take Kingdoms, to pay Kings".

To generate further publicity for the delegation from Awadh, on 3 March 1857, the Queen Mother and Princes visited the Theatre Royal, Drury Lane to see a pantomime based on Babes in the Woods. It was the first time that Malika Kishwar had appeared in public, though she sat with her female attendants in the Royal Box behind blue and silver tissue fabric. According to The Illustrated London News, her appearance "created considerable interest and curiosity", and that "The effect of so many different Oriental costumes was rich and peculiar". At Queen Victoria's prompting, Vernon Smith finally went to visit the Malika Kishwar later that month. He and other ministers of Parliament were still nervous that arranging a meeting with Queen Victoria would signal an acknowledgement of the mission from Awadh. According to Vernon Smith, however, Victoria herself was starting become "rather anxious" that the Court of Directors of the East India Company were preventing her from showing the courtesy she felt was due.

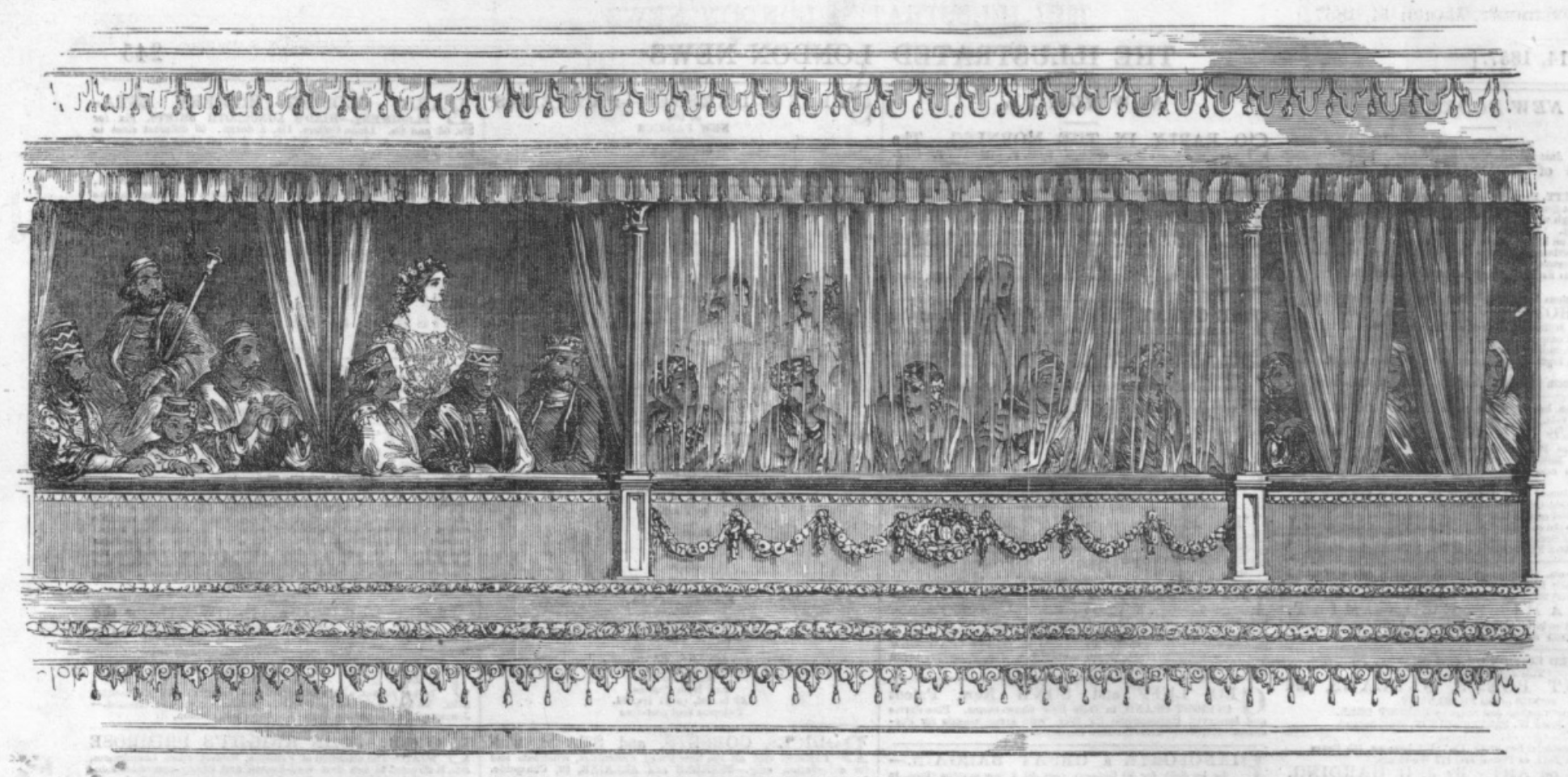
"Queen and Princes of Oude and Suite at Drury-Lane Theatre" in The Illustrated London News (14 March 1857)

=== Visit with Queen Victoria ===
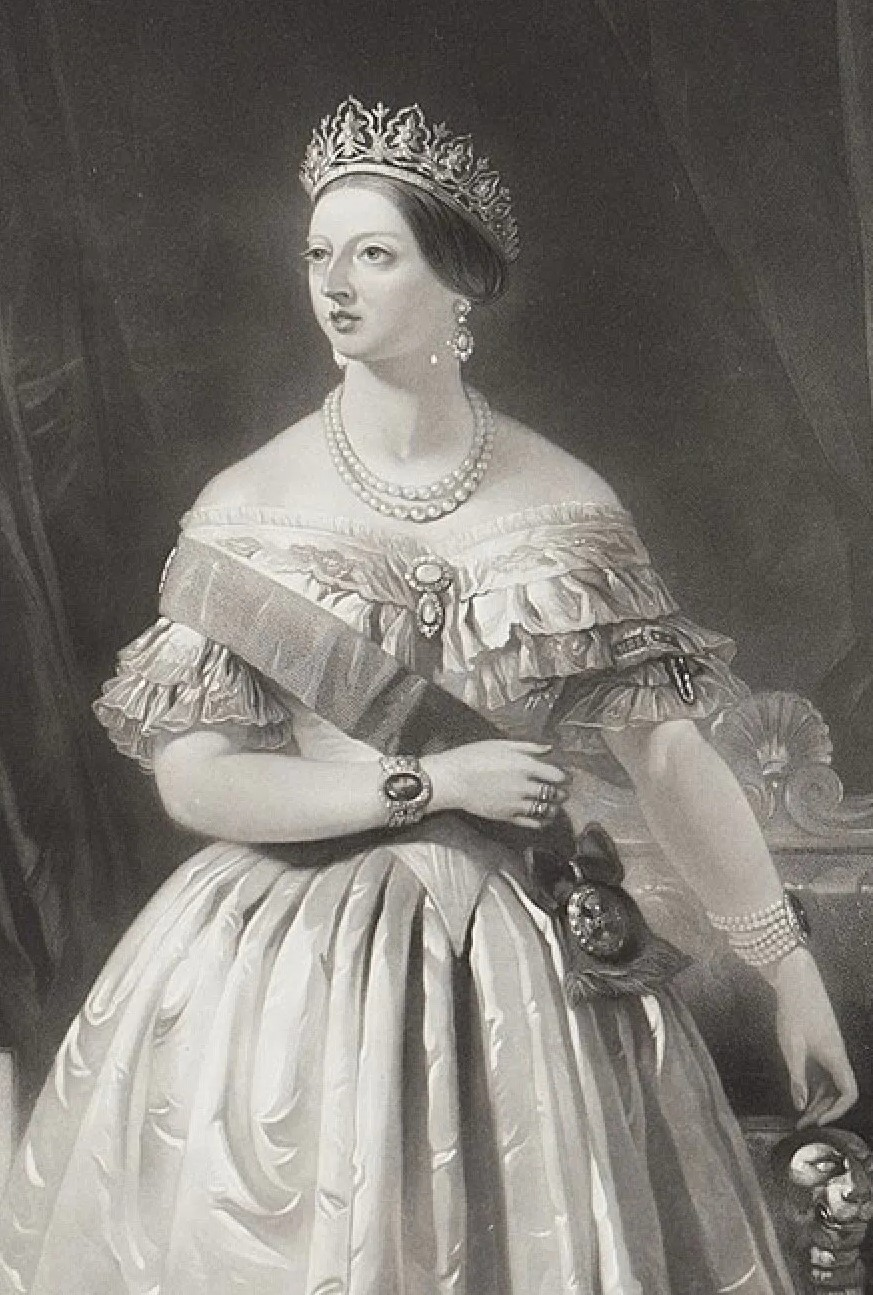
Queen Victoria (1857)

When news of the first incidents in the Indian Rebellion of 1857 reached the United Kingdom, Robert Vernon Smith thought it might be a good excuse to cancel any meeting between the two queens. The meeting went ahead regardless, with prior agreement that there would be no discussion of politics.

The visit was scheduled for 4 July 1857 at Buckingham Palace. In her diary, Queen Victoria wrote about the audience, "Much trouble in arranging that no man should look at her." Malika Kishwar, her son, and grandson sat in the "closet" next to the White Drawing Room with Victoria's ladies in waiting. Victoria and Prince Albert and seven of their children then entered the room behind Malika Kishwar, along with Vernon Smith and Sir George Clark, the interpreter.

Malika Kishwar threw back her veil and kissed Victoria's hand, as did Prince Hamid Ali. A few words were exchanged, and Malika Kishwar and Victoria were seated, while Prince Albert and their two eldest sons stood behind the Queen Mother of Oudh. Victoria wrote, "She was much weighed down by her heavy dress, her crown and jewels, being very small. She has fine eyes, painted, as is customary."Victoria was presented with a signed letter from Wajid Ali Shah and what she described as "a handsome ornament of pearls and precious stones" with a "very curious" flask of "sweet-smelling perfume" attached.

Historian Kamal ud-Din Haider later published a more detailed account of the brief meeting in Urdu, likely based on the recollections of one of the female attendants who had been present. According to that account, the ensuing conversation was polite but awkward, focusing on sailing and the sea journey from Calcutta. Victoria asked if Malika Kishwar had had the opportunity to visit English mansions and offered to arrange some visits for her. She also offered another longer meeting the following week, but no such meeting took place. For Malika Kishwar, it was far from her original intention to plead, queen-to-queen and mother-to-mother, for the restoration of her son's kingdom. For Queen Victoria, it was to be the only time in her life she would meet face to face with a Muslim woman from India.

=== Arrest of Wajid Ali Shah ===
Wajid Ali Shah was arrested and imprisoned at Fort William in Calcutta on 15 June 1857, but the news took almost four weeks to reach Malika Kishwar and royal family in London. Prior to the outbreak of the rebellion in India, their representatives including Masih-uh-din Khan, Major Robert Bird, and barrister Samuel Lucas had argued vigorously against the annexation of Oudh and the corruption of the East India Company, publishing books, a pamphlet, and letters in major newspapers such as The Times. Following the arrest, the focus of the mission shifted to distancing the king from any involvement in the rebellion, protesting his innocence, and lobbying for his release.

On 6 August 1857, Lord Campbell, Chief Justice of the Queen's Bench, presented a petition to the House of Lords on their behalf, which was rejected due to a technical error. The petition then went to the House of Commons, which declined to discuss it. The mission to England thus ended in failure one year after their arrival, but their departure was delayed for several months. The Awadh delegation moved into a cheaper accommodations on Warwick Road West in Paddington, after their lease of Harley House expired.

=== Denial of passports ===
On 14 October 1857, lawyers for Malika Kishwar requested a passport for her and others to travel through the continent on the way back to Calcutta, but the British Foreign Office responded by stating that passports were issued only to British subjects, and asking "whether the Queen applies for a passport in that character for Herself and Party". By doing so, they were pushing for Malika Kishwar to formally accept the annexation of Oude in writing, and thus undermine any argument for independence. The following day, another law firm representing Malika Kishwar replied that "The Queen of Oude and her family requested Passports under the impression that they were entitled to do so, as being under British protection", referring to the fact that Awadh had been a British protectorate prior to annexation. On 16 October 1857, the Foreign Office replied that Lord Clarendon, the Foreign Secretary, would be unable to grant the passports.

The Board of Control, which still managed British affairs in India, had been consulted in the decision to deny the request. Historian Rosie Llewellyn-Jones suggests that Lord Clarendon's main concern was that Queen of Awadh would stir up sympathy when she travelled, as international public opinion about British conduct in India was negative. Cultural historian Prem Poddar argues that the passport affair epitomised the fundamental tension between British imperial ambition and perceived threats to British national identity.

After hearing about the consequences of the Indian uprising, Malika Kishwar decided to proceed on a pilgrimage to Mecca. She applied to the Court of Directors of the East India Company for a financial settlement independent of Wajid Ali Shah or any other family members. Her request was refused because the Secretary of the Government of India had received intelligence suggesting that she and others had been in communication with mutineers.

By the end of the year, Malika Kishwar's health had worsened. She expressed her wish to leave the country as soon as possible, so she would not die in England. Finally, the French Embassy in London intervened to allow her to travel in January 1858.

== Death in Paris ==
Between 40 to 45 members of the delegation travelled with the queen mother to France. They crossed the English Channel to Dieppe and then went by train to Paris, arriving at Gare Saint-Lazare on 21 January 1858. Malika Kishwar died three days later, on 24 January, in a hotel on Rue Laffitte in Paris. The cause of death given was a decline from long-term illness, accompanied by anxiety.

=== Burial at Père Lachaise ===
Queen Mother Malika Kishwar was buried at sundown on 27 January 1858 at Père Lachaise Cemetery, which had opened a Muslim section the year before. Thirteen carriages accompanied her coffin, which was in a hearse drawn by six black horses. The Islamic funeral ceremony took place under a canopy. Representatives of Turkey, Persia, and Rome were in attendance. Her one-year-old granddaughter, Princess Rifat Ara Begum, who had also died in Paris, was buried alongside her.

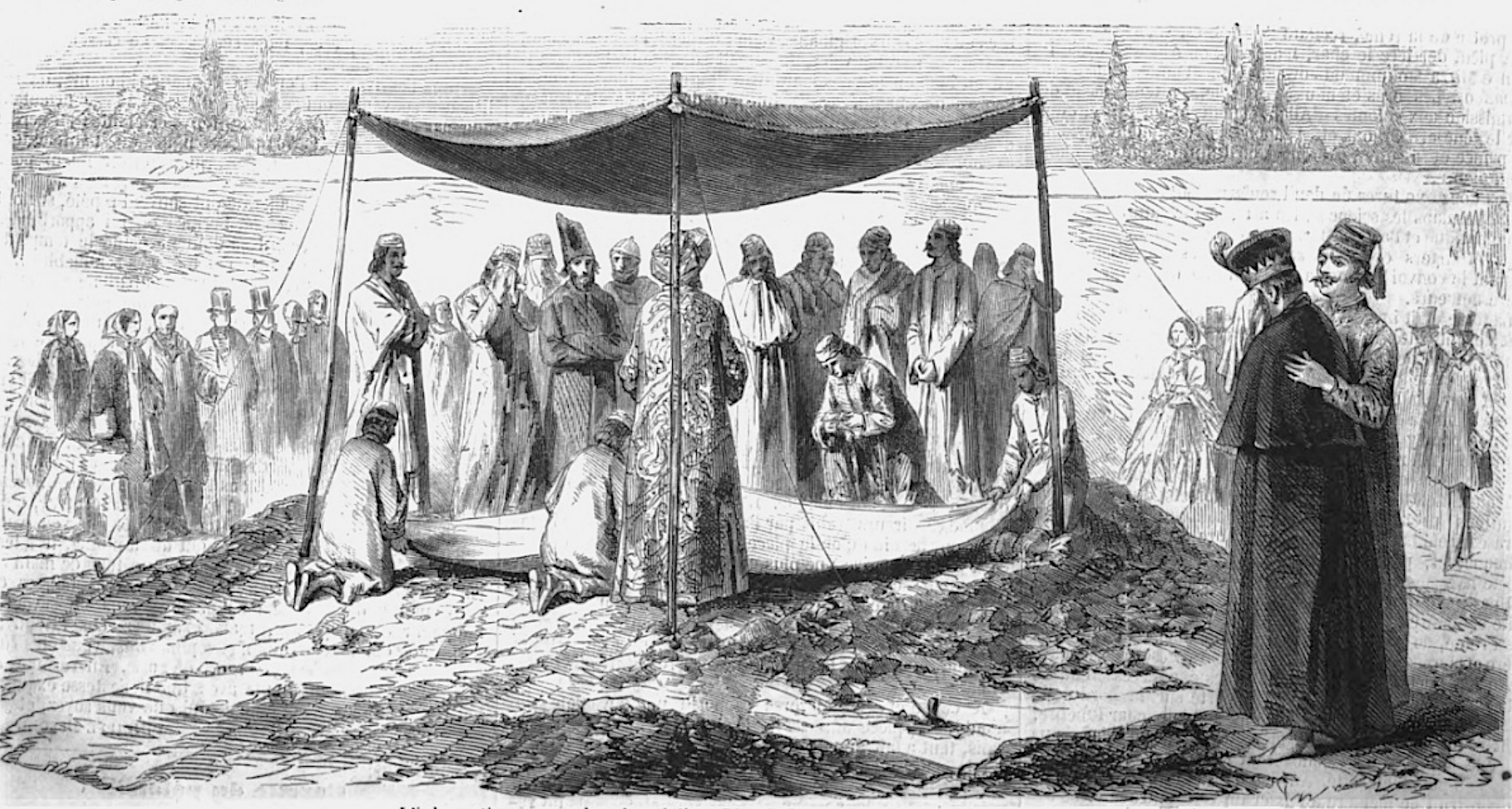
Burial of Malika Kishwar at sundown at Père Lachaise Cemetery (L'Illustration)

The mourners returned to Warwick Road in London. On 25 February 1858, General Prince Mirza Sikandar Hashmat died in London of "water on the chest and fistula". Masih-ud-din Khan arranged the embalming of his body which was sent to Paris for burial in the same grave as his mother and daughter. Hamid Ali, the son of Wajid Ali Shah and his chief consort Khas Mahal, eventually returned to Calcutta.

== Legacy ==
=== Tomb of family ===
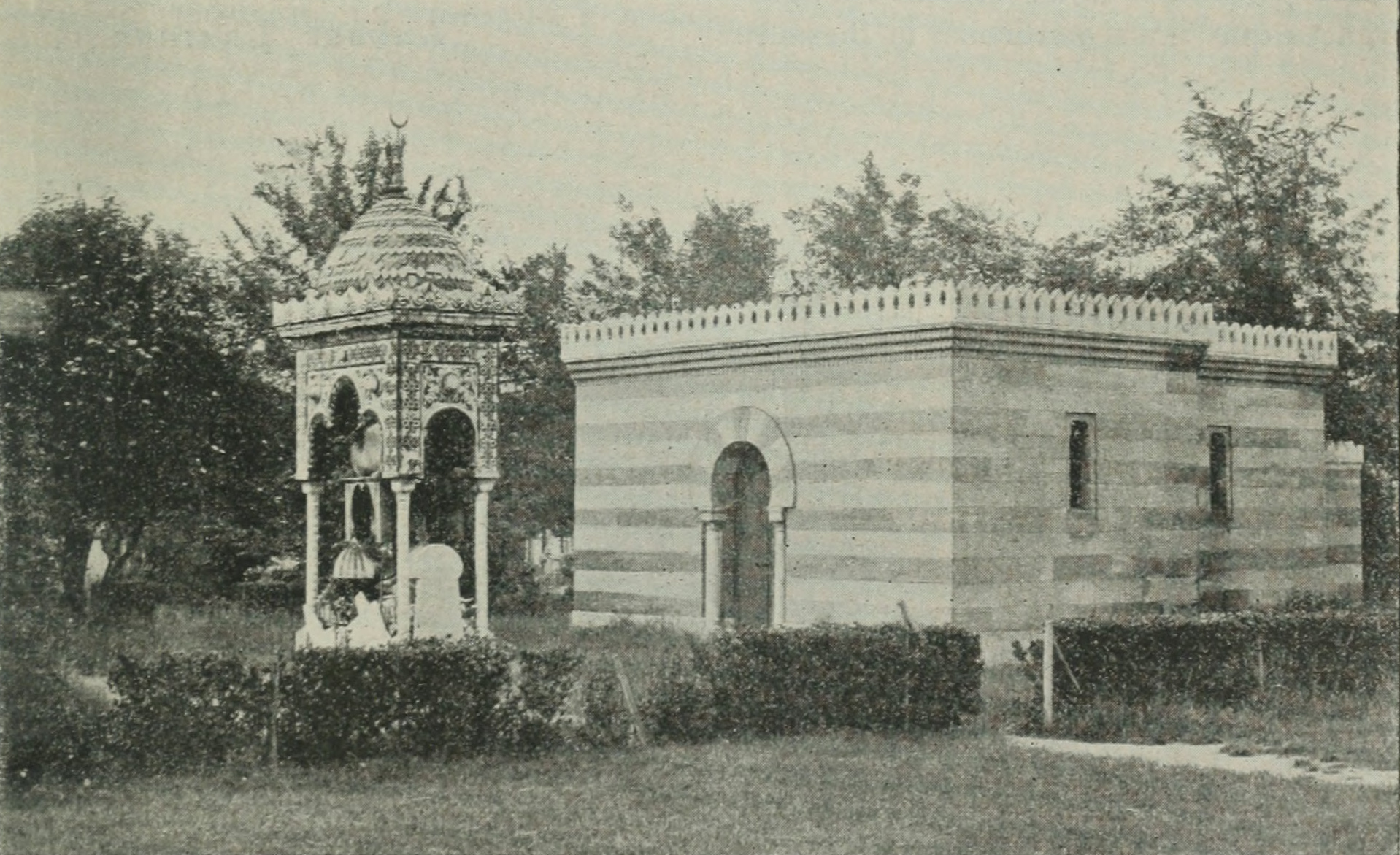
Monument and tomb of the Queen of Oude (1896)

In April 1858, Masih-ud-din Khan had a local stonemason erect a large tomb at Père Lachaise cemetery, where Malika Kishwar, her son, and granddaughter had been buried. In 1884, the Prefect of the Seine, Eugène Poubelle, wrote to the British ambassador to France noting that the tomb was in poor condition and suggesting that their government pay for the maintenance of the tomb, since Awadh was now ruled by the British crown. Plans to demolish the existing structure and rebuild it with stone and marble were sent to Wajid Ali Shah near the end of his life, along with estimated costs. The former king claimed he was unaware that the tomb had been built in the first place and refused to pay for it, and there was little support for the British Raj to take it on as a public expenditure.

Today the grave of Malika Kishwar, Sikandar Hashmat, and Rifat Ara in Père Lachaise Cemetery in Paris can be found near the grave of Marcel Proust. It is a large square raised platform covered with brickwork.

=== Grave of granddaughter ===
Another infant daughter of Sikandar Hashmat is buried at Paddington Old Cemetery in Kilburn in the London Borough of Brent in the United Kingdom. According to the faded inscription on the tombstone, her name was Princess Omdutel Aurau Begum. Her mother was one of the prince's two Rajput wives, both of whom had been pregnant when they arrived in Southampton in August 1856. The princess died at 18 months on 14 April 1858.

== In popular culture ==
- In the 1977 film The Chess Players directed by Satyajit Ray, the role of the Queen Mother (Malika Kishwar) is played by Veena.

== Gallery ==
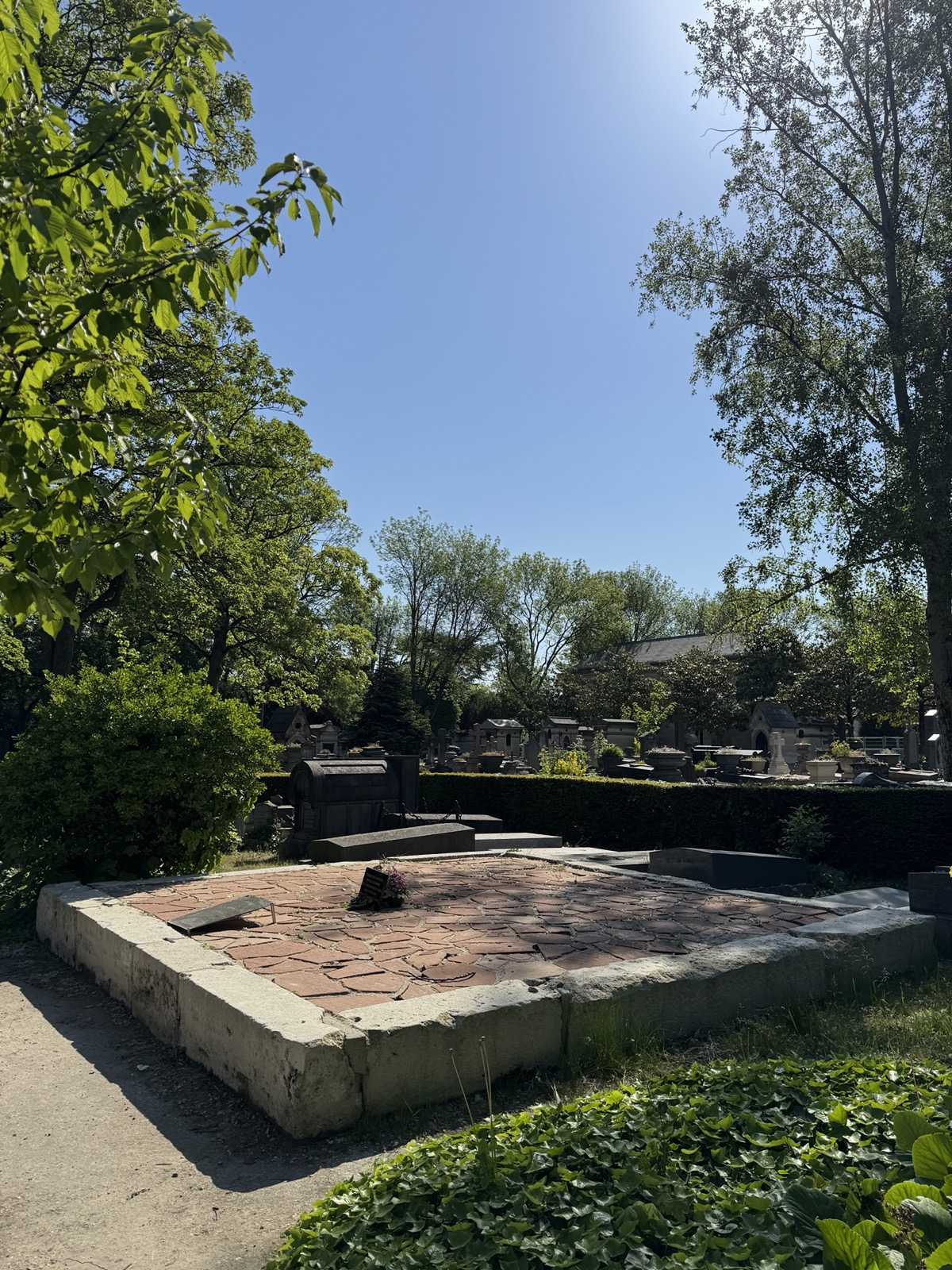
Grave at Père Lachaise Cemetery, Paris (2026)

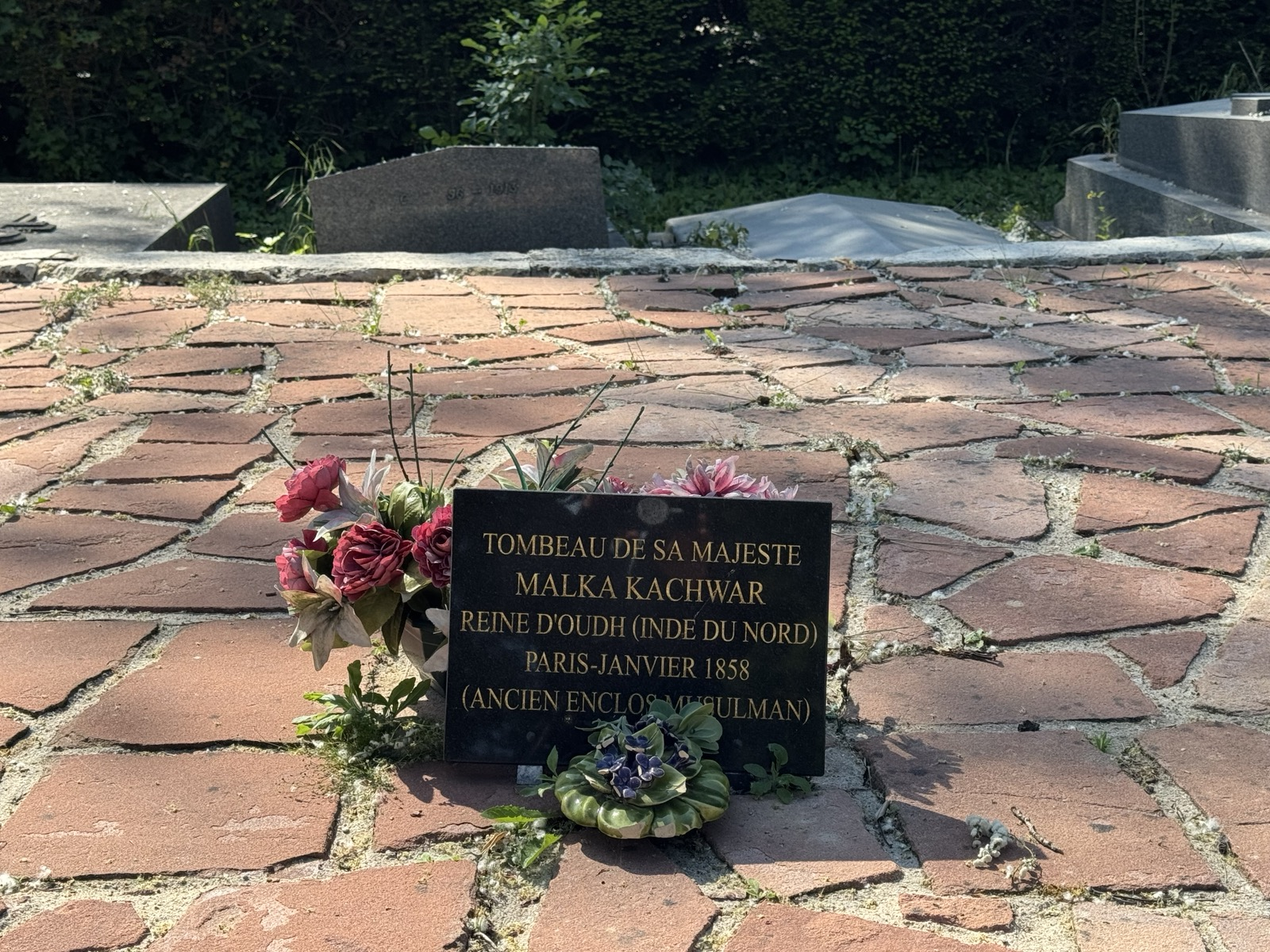
Plaque marking the "Tomb of Her Majesty Malka Kachwar"

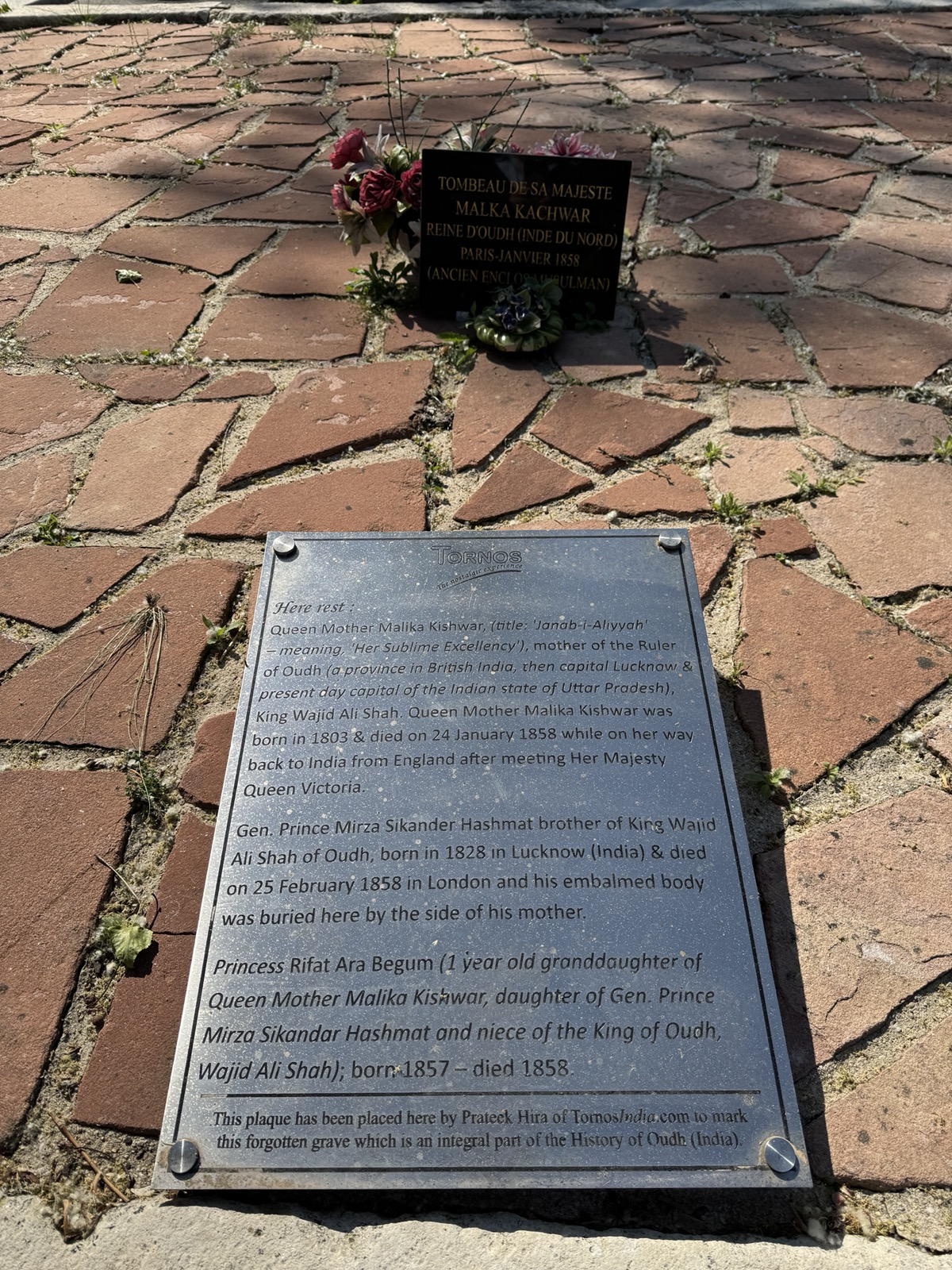
Plaque memorialising Queen Mother Malika Kishwar, Gen. Prince Mirza Sikander Hashmat, and Princess Rifat Ara Begum

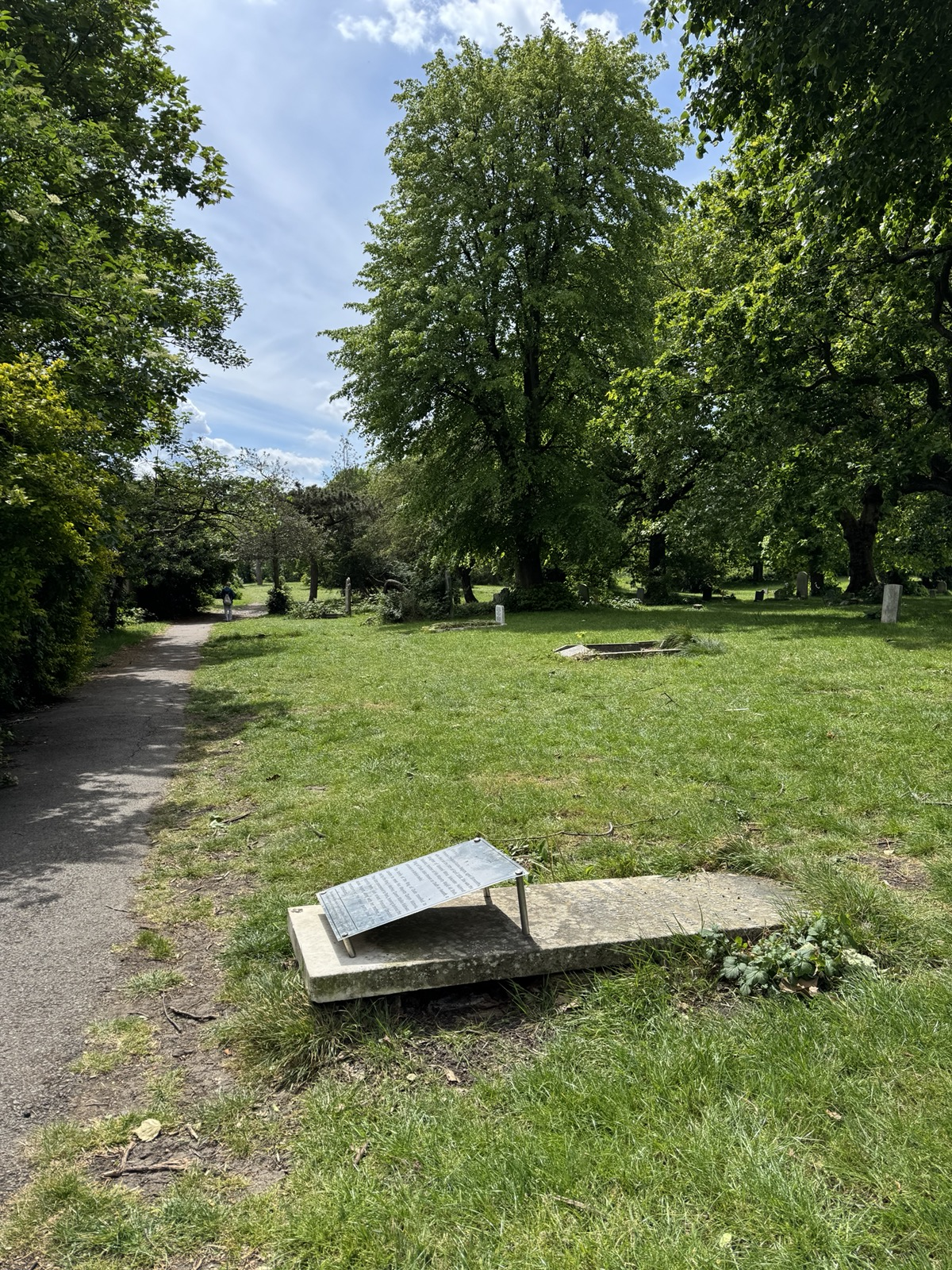
Grave of Princess Omdutel in Paddington Old Cemetery, London

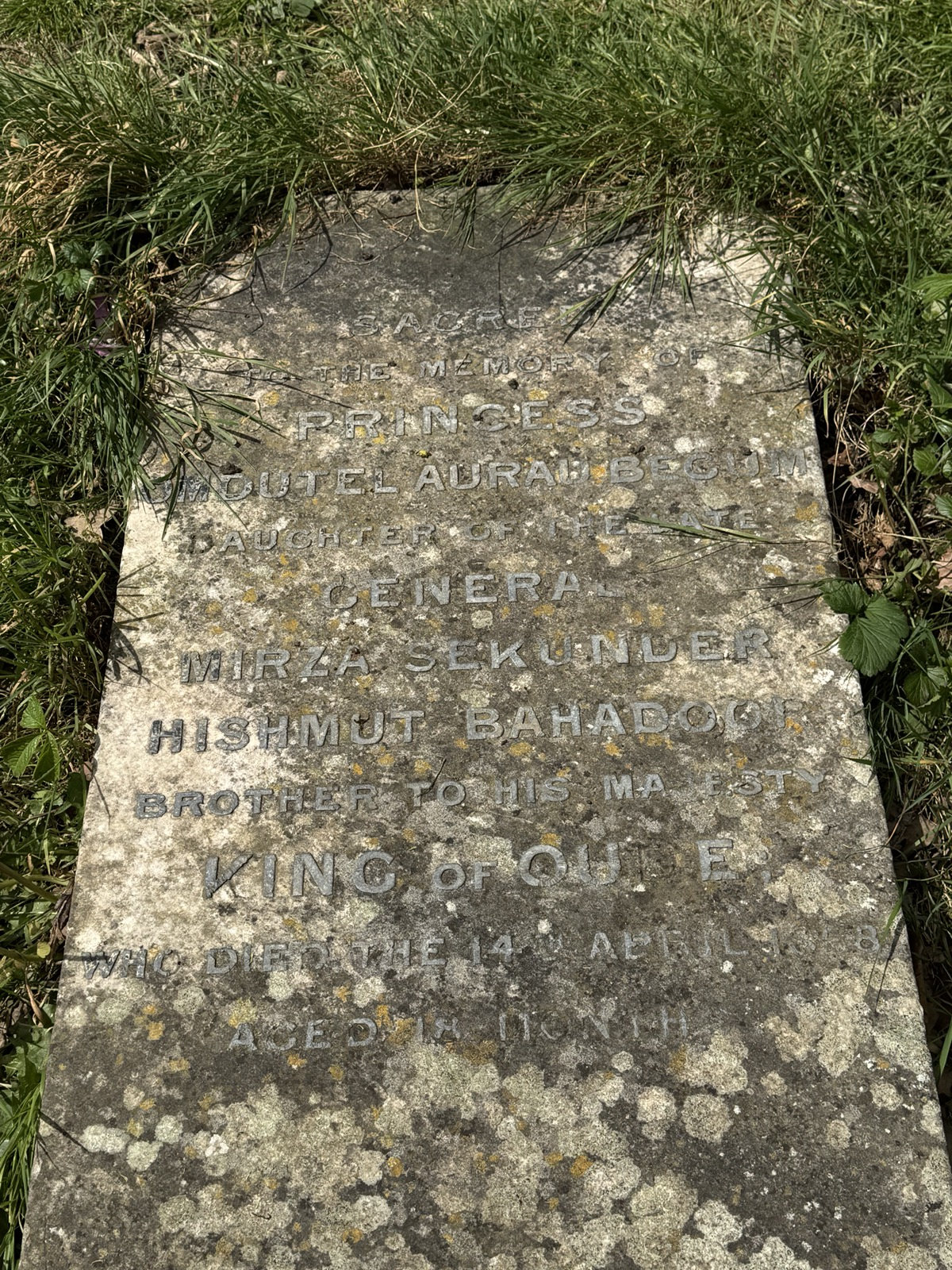
Original tombstone on grave of "Omdutel Aurau Begum"

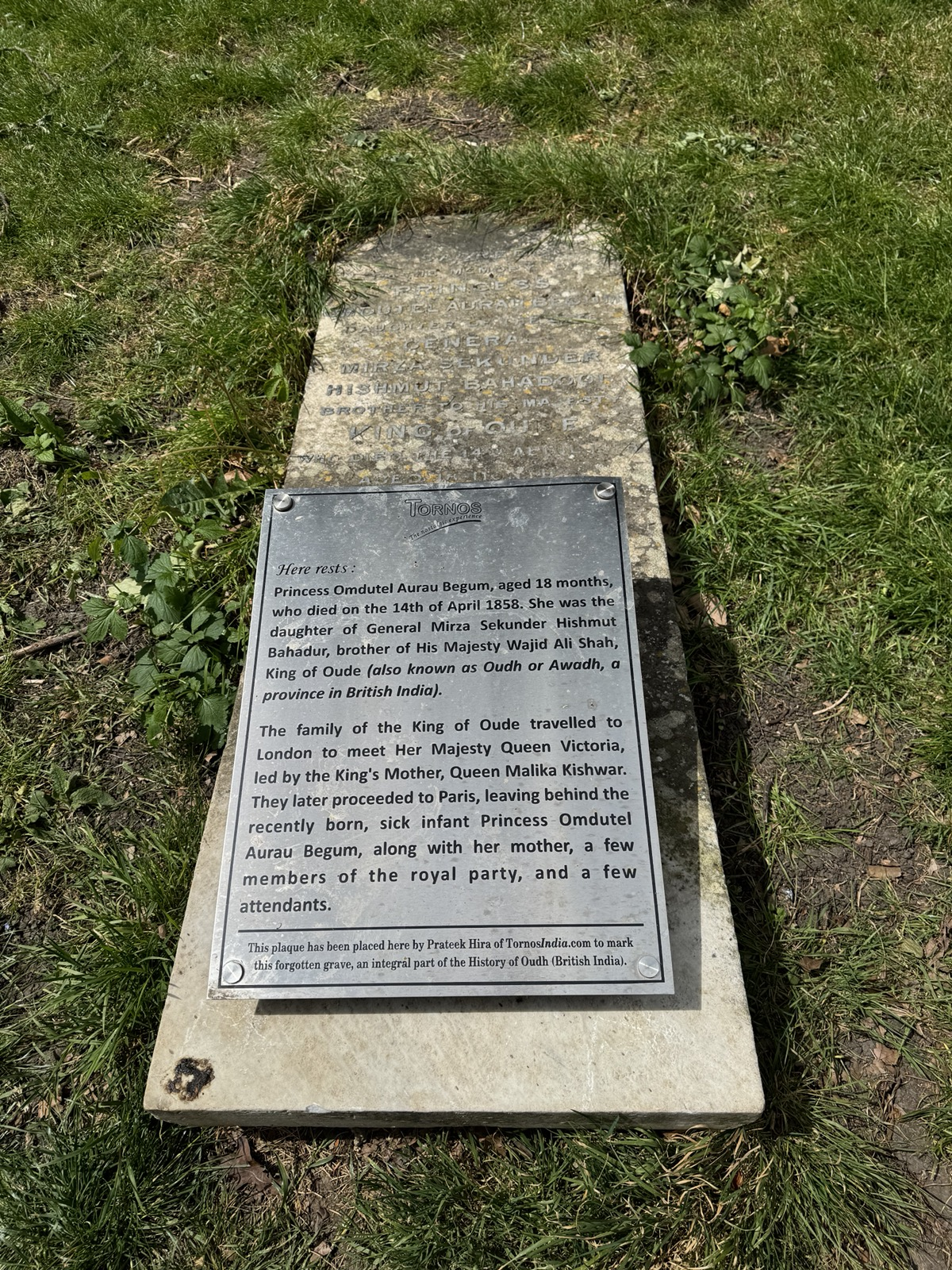
Plaque on grave of Princess Omdutel
