= Dionysius Wielobycki =

Polish doctor based in Scotland (1813–1882)

Dionysius Wielobycki (1813 – 16 November 1882) was a 19th century Polish doctor living in Scotland. A controversial homeopath during a period of scientific focus, his adventurous life ranged from being a soldier in the November Uprising and being a noted astronomer to being found guilty of fraud in the British courts. He was fluent in Polish, German, French and English.

== Life ==
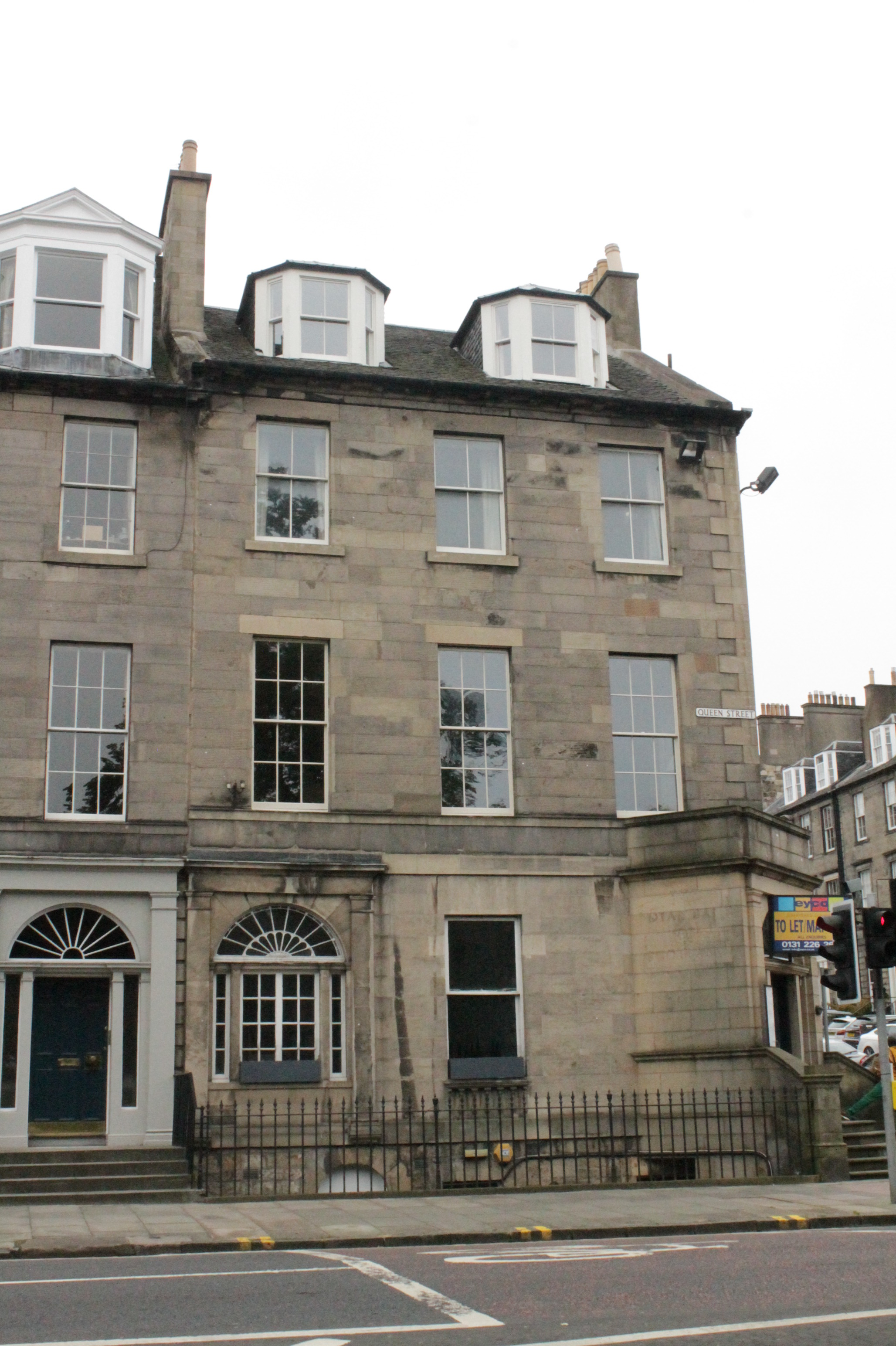
59 Queen Street, Edinburgh

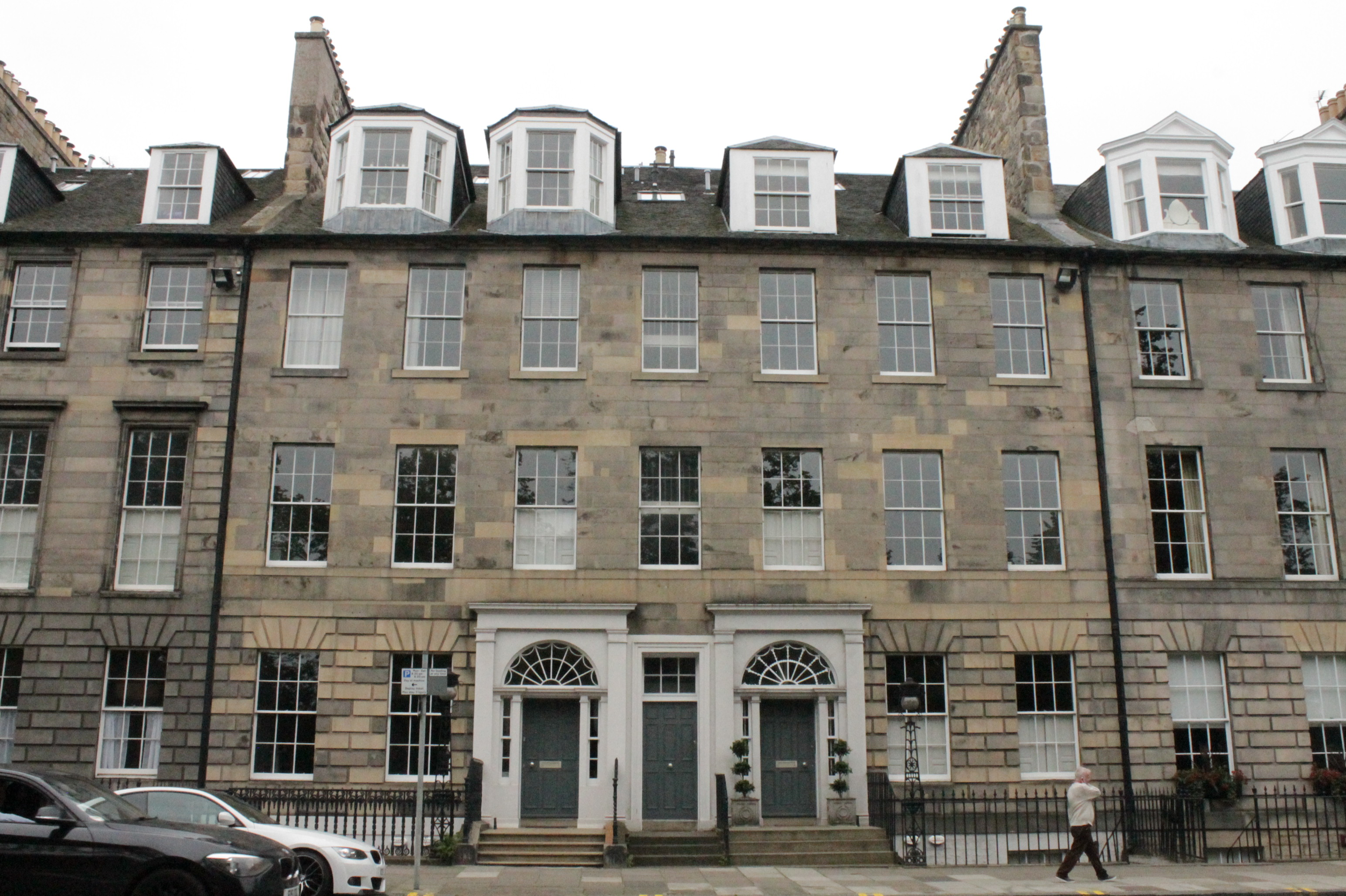
55, 56, 57 Queen Street, Edinburgh

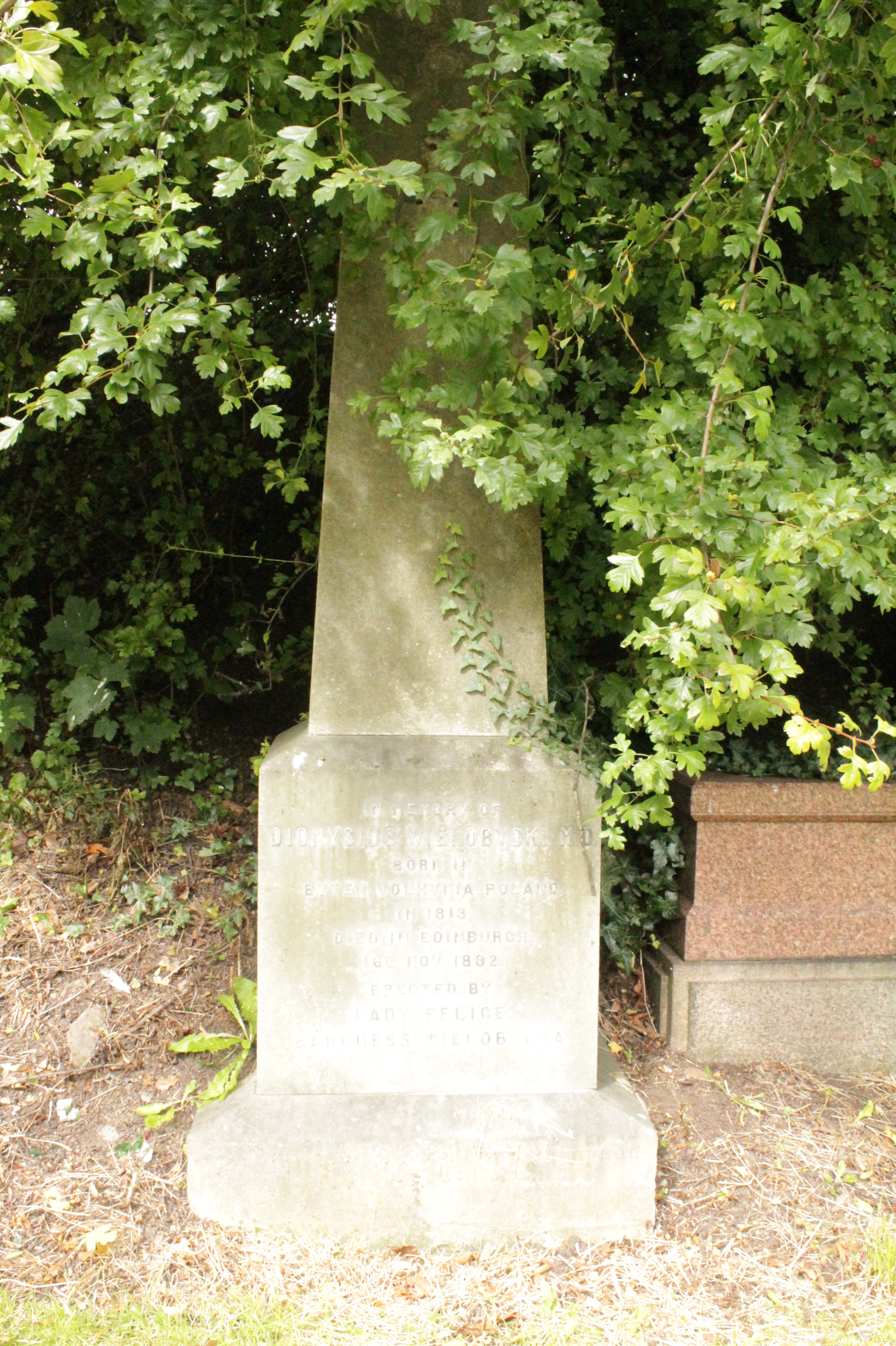
The grave of Dionysius Wielobycki, Grange Cemetery

He was born the second son of Stanislaw Wielobycki a judge and his wife Sophie Soboloska in 1813. The family had lived initially in Byten in the Wolyn region in what is now Ukraine then moved west to what is now Poland (but was then Austria-Hungary territory) in or near Kraków, where he studied medicine. He would have spoken both German and Polish. He was a member of the Kraków Astronomical Society.

In 1830/31 he and his whole family took arms in a local fight for independence from Russia (November Uprising) and recognition of their Polish identity. His father was a captain in this resistance movement.

Initially studying science at Kraków University and Bonn University under a false (German) name, he obtained a PhD at the University of Berlin in 1837. Originally intending to stay in Kraków his role in the 1830 rebellion was exposed and he was imprisoned in Kraków. He escaped and managed to evade capture in a 900 km cross-country trip to Hamburg.

In 1839 he left Germany with his older brother Severin Wielobycki, sailing from Hamburg to Leith. He initially made a living teaching French (which was more in demand than Polish or German).

In 1841 he enrolled at Edinburgh University with his brother, both studying medicine. They received their doctorate (MD) in 1843 and his brother left to Canada soon thereafter (but returned to Britain and worked in London). His dissertation was on "plica polonica". From 1843 to 1845 he was assistant surgeon at the Royal Maternity Hospital. He was created a Licentiate of the Royal College of Physicians of Edinburgh (LRCPE). He was then living at 35 York Place, Edinburgh.

He decided to focus in the field of homeopathy and joined Drs Francis Black and John Rutherford Russell in the Stockbridge Homeopathic Dispensary. Up to this time he was living at a flat at 25 Montagu Street in the south of the city.

Immediately successful as a homeopath, in 1850 he took premises at 59 Queen Street, Edinburgh. However, in 1852, the Edinburgh medical society his and his brother Severin's Licentiate.

He moved to a slightly smaller ground floor and basement house at 55 Queen Street in 1855. He appears to have had many affluent clients in Edinburgh's New Town and his stealing of wealthy clients from the Edinburgh medical establishment continued as a friction.

In 1856 he was charged with forging the will of a patient and making himself the beneficiary. This concerned the Darling family of Portobello. Thomas Darling had left his estate to his sisters: Margaret and Isabella. Wiebolycki in conspiracy with Isabella forged a will of Margaret (who died a few months after Thomas). He had already got Isabella to leave her estate to him. The crime, whilst proven, was somewhat futile as Isabella would have inherited from Margaret with or without a will. The sum concerned was £1200. He was found guilty and sentenced to be transported to Australia for 14 years. Going into hiding in England he was apprehended on 28 November 1856. He spent time in various prisons: Wakefield Prison, Lewes Prison and the infamous Dartmoor Prison where he spent from July 1859 until February 1862. He was then released after appeal to the Old Bailey, his defence being led by the Dean of Faculty of Scotland himself.

In 1862 he was living in Leicester and running a homeopathic clinic there on Granby Street.

From 1871 until death he was living at 3 George Square, Edinburgh.

In 1881 he got back in the news: suing Isaac Atkinson, an affluent tailor living at 12 St Andrew Square in the city centre. Atkinson was obliged to return £107 to the doctor.

He died in Edinburgh on 16 November 1882 and is buried in Grange Cemetery in the south of the city. The grave lies in an obscured location backing onto the south side of the central vaults on their east side.

== Family ==
In 1871, shortly before return to Edinburgh, he married Henrietta Felicia Kierblewska Kennedy ("Lady Felice") of 5 Eldon Place in Bradford. Her real background is still unknown, though there were suppositions that she was the daughter of Stephen Kennedy Esq.

After his death his wife styled herself "Baroness Wielobycka" and married a Dr Robert MacHardy LLD, the organist at Edinburgh Cathedral. They travelled around Europe. However their lavish lifestyle exhausted their funds. She was forced to sell 3 George Square to pay debts and they lived then in humble house at Lesmahagow before final years in a cottage ("hut") on Whitehill Close near Chapel farm in the parish of Strathaven.
