= Hazratganj =

Business district in Uttar Pradesh, India

- Business District
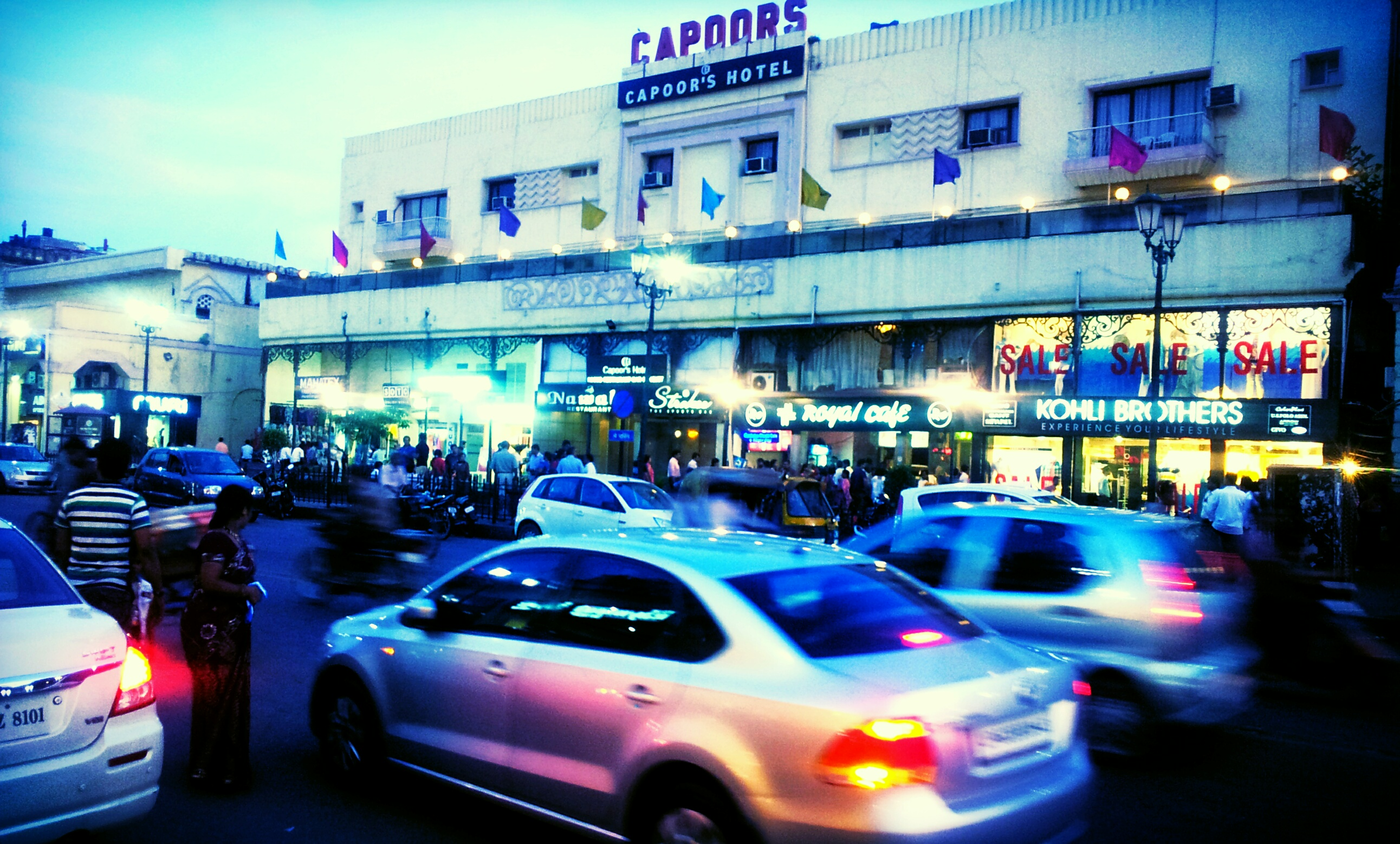

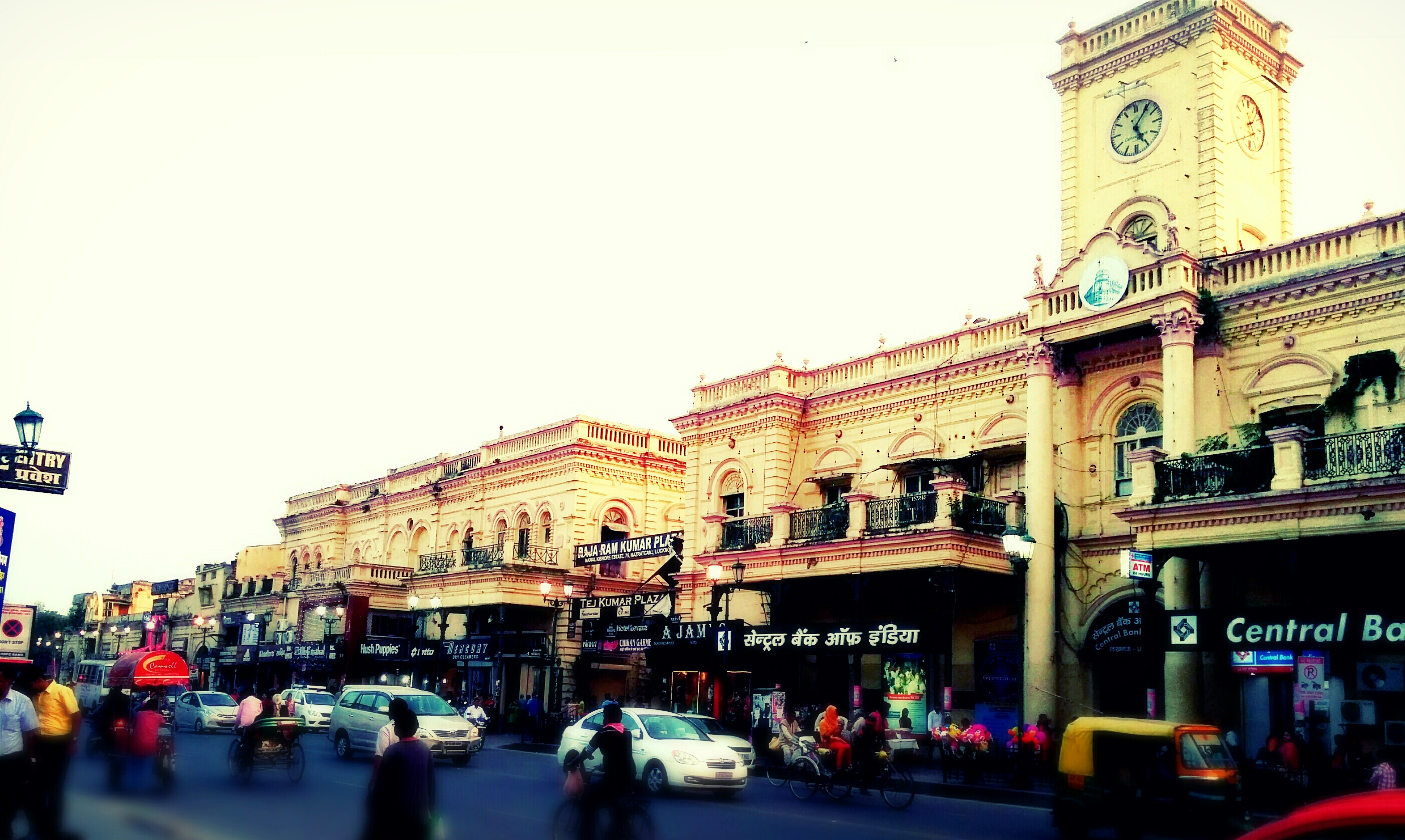
- Atal Chowk, Lucknow City
- Nickname: Ganj
- Location within Uttar Pradesh
- Coordinates: 26.85555107860186°N 80.94298025551977°E
- Country: India
- State: Uttar Pradesh
- District: Lucknow
- Founder: Nawab Nasir-ud-Din Haidar Shah
- Named for: Atal Bihari Vajpayee (Former Prime Minister of India)

Government
  - Body: Lucknow Municipal Corporation
- Postal code: 226001
- Public Transit access: Hazratganj
- Website: lucknowtourism.co.in/hazratganj-lucknow

Hazratganj is the central business district of Lucknow, the capital and largest city of the Indian state of Uttar Pradesh. In addition to bazaars, it also contains shopping complexes, restaurants, hotels, theatres, cafés and many offices. It is connected to the Lucknow Metro by the Hazratganj metro station.

== History ==
In 1827, Nawab Nasir-ud-Din Haidar Shah laid the foundation of the Ganj market by introducing the China Bazaar and Kaptaan Bazaar, which sold goods from China, Japan, and Belgium.

In 1842, the name of the area was changed to Hazratganj after Nawab Amjad Ali Shah, who was popularly known by his alias 'Hazrat'.

After the Indian Mutiny in 1857, the British took over administration of the city, and Hazratganj was remodelled after London's Queen Street. Many old Mughal-style buildings were demolished and new Victorian structures were constructed.

Ring Theatre, the present post office, served as the ballroom and theatre for British officers. Later on, it was converted into a special court and witnessed the hearing of the Kakori Conspiracy case. From 1929–1932, the building was renovated to the Gothic style, and a clock tower was constructed in the centre.

When Amjad Ali Shah died, his son, Wajid Ali Shah, had an imambara constructed in Sibtainabad for 10 lakh (one million). The magnificent edifice is now called Sibtainabad Imambara, a centrally protected monument, also under the U.P. Shia Central Board of Waqfs, situated on Mahatma Gandhi Marg, opposite Halwasiya Market. The memorial, which was previously in a state of neglect, has recently been restored.

The Indian Coffee House (ICH) came up during the First World War (1914–1918) and was then owned by the Filmistan Cinema, which today is known as Sahu Cinema. Unlike Mayfair and Ring Theatre, ICH hosted journalists, writers, and thinkers like Dr. Ram Manohar Lohia Atal Bihari V, Chandra Shekhar to Yashpal, Amritlal Nagar, Bhagwati Charan Verma, and Anand Narain Mulla. On August 16, 2019, it was renamed "Atal Chowk" to honor the late prime minister, Atal Bihari Vajpayee.

=== Beautification and makeover ===
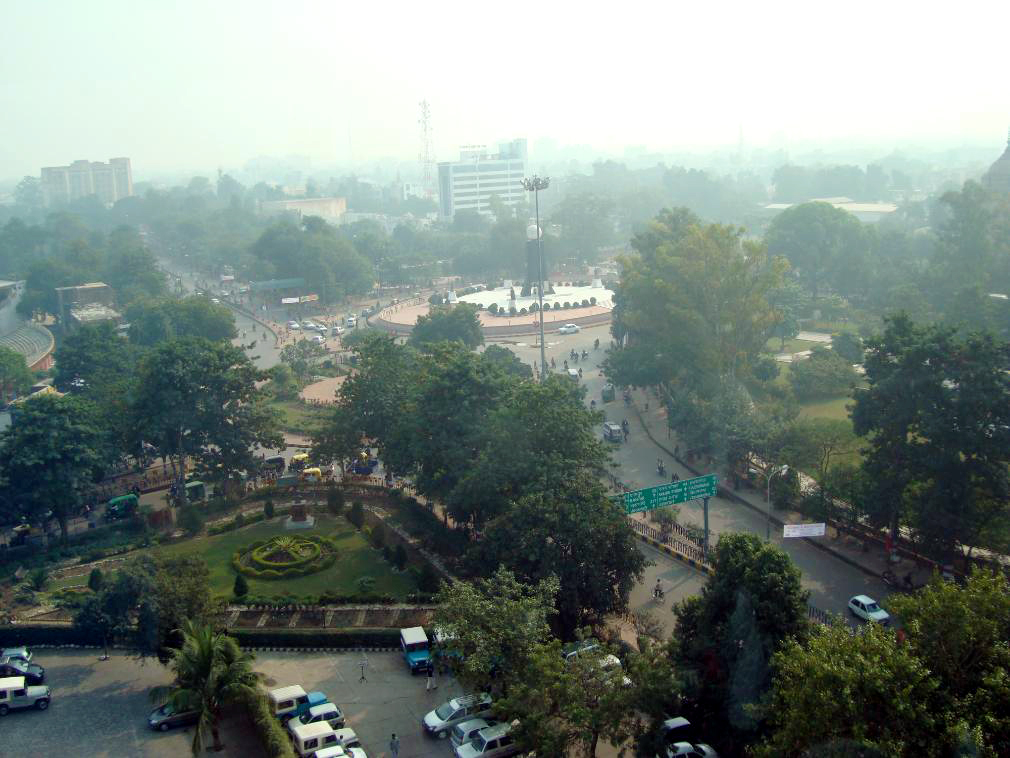
'Parivartan Chowk' in Hazratganj, Lucknow

In 2010, to celebrate 200 years of Hazratganj, the then government started a programme for the makeover of the area. The original makeover plan designed by the country's noted architect, Nasir Munjee, several years ago served as the basis for the final plan, that entailed an expense of Rs 30 crore (300 million).

Hoardings from rooftops and encroachments on the road were removed. Buildings were painted in a uniform crème and pink; the same size and colour signage, stone pavements, Victorian-style balustrades, lamp posts, waste bins, benches, an open-air tiny amphitheatre, and colourful fountains were constructed. The century-old fire station was demolished to make way for the modern multi-level parking.

== Shopping ==
Hazratganj is a major Victorian-style shopping area. It houses showrooms, shopping complexes, restaurants, hotels, cafés, theatres, offices, and businesses. Hazratganj shops sell the famous Lucknow chikan embroidered material.

The Sahara Ganj Mall is a 5-story major shopping mall located in Hazratganj. It is one of the largest shopping malls in India, covering an area of over 425,000 square feet.

=== Movie theaters ===
Hazratganj has two operating cinemas: Sahu Cinema, located right next to the main Hazratganj crossroad, and Novelty Cinema at Lalbagh Circle. The closed Mayfair Cinema was once known for showing Hollywood movies. Other former cinemas in Hazratganj include Capitol and the now-demolished Leela.

== Ganj Carnival ==
Lucknow Development Authority (LDA), together with the city's administration, organises a monthly carnival on the second Sunday of each month in Hazratganj market. Various types of cultural and entertainment programmes are held for the general public. Lucknow Police watches the crowd with the help of drone cameras.

== Atal Chowk ==
Atal Chowk crossing is the busiest crossing in Lucknow city. It is situated at the confluence of NH-24, NH-25, NH-28, and NH-24B. The whole area, along with the crossing, falls into Lucknow's Heritage zone.

== Religion and education ==
The Hazratganj area is home to St. Francis' College, Seventh Day Adventist Senior Secondary School, La Martiniere Girls' College, Loreto Convent Lucknow, Christ Church College, National P. G. College, St. Joseph's Catholic Cathedral and Cathedral Sr Sec School.
