= Amjad Ali Shah =

King of Awadh from 1842 to 1847

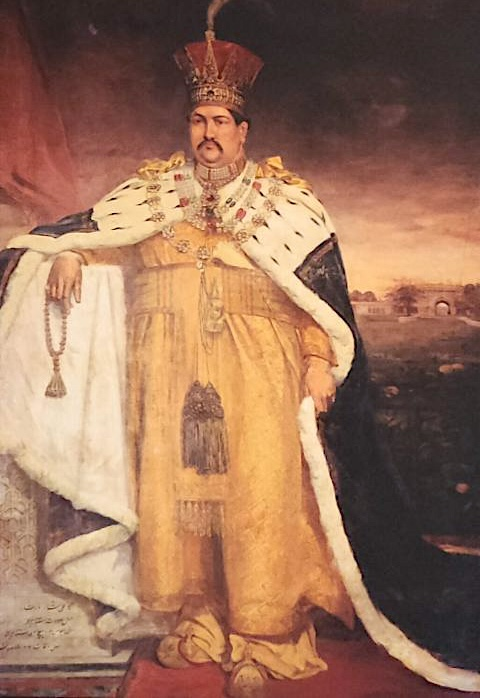
- Portrait, 1842

King of Oudh
- Reign: 7 May 1842 – 13 February 1847
- Coronation: 17 May 1842, Farhat Bakhsh Palace, Lucknow
- Predecessor: Muhammad Ali Shah
- Successor: Wajid Ali Shah
- Born: before 30 January 1801; Lucknow
- Died: 13 February 1847; Farhat Bakhsh Palace, Lucknow
- Burial: Imambara Sibtainabad, Hazratganj, Lucknow
- Spouse: Malika Kishwar Taj Ara Begum; Hussaini Khanum; Mosahib Khanum; Sakina Khanum; Malika Ahad
- Issue: Mustafa Ali; Wajid Ali Shah; Mirza Jawad Khan
Names
- Najmud-Daulah Abul Muzaffar Musleh-uddin Muhammad Amjad Ali Shah
- Persian: امجد علی شاه
- House: Nishapuri
- Dynasty: Qara Qoyunlu
- Father: Muhammad Ali Shah
- Religion: Shia Islam

Amjad Ali Shah (Note: Persian: امجد علی شاه; Urdu: امجد علی شاہ) (c. 1800 – 13 February 1847) was the tenth nawab of Awadh in northern India from 1842 to 1847, and the fourth ruler to hold the title of King of Oudh. He was known for prioritising religious piety over managing the affairs of state. A devout follower of the Shia ulama, he gave the clergy control over the judicial system. He was succeeded by Wajid Ali Shah, the elder of his two sons with chief consort Malika Kishwar. Today he is credited with having started the Hazratganj quarter of Lucknow.

== Early life and family ==
He was the son of Muhammad Ali Shah and Malika Afaq. Because his father was the third son of nawab Saadat Ali Khan, in his youth his own accession had seemed unlikely. His tutors included Imdad Hussain Khan, who later became his minister, and various religious scholars. His upbringing was said to have been cultured, disciplined, and restrained.

His father became king when Amjad Ali Shah was around the age of 37. As his father's second wife Malika Jahan was childless, his claim as the rightful heir was uncontested.

His chief consort was Malika Kishwar. She was a descendant of Mughal court poet and minister Abdul Rahim Khan-i-Khanan of Delhi, and herself a granddaughter of Saadat Ali Khan. When Amjad Ali Shah became King of Oudh in May 1842, their son Wajid Ali Shah was formally named the heir apparent. His eldest son Mustafa Ali Khan, whose mother was one of his concubines, was ruled out as a possible successor. Although he had multiple wives and spent a great deal of time in his harem, he largely managed to avoid the scandals of his predecessors and successor.

== Religion and governance ==
His reign began on 17 May 1842. As king, Amjad Ali Shah emphasised the importance of religiosity, deferring to the authority of the mujtahid on many matters. He deeply admired Sayyid Muhammad Nasirabadi in particular, referring to him as the Sultan of the Ulama. Over time, he gave increasing governmental responsibility to the Shia clergy.

Amjad Ali Shah introduced changes to the judicial system which gave them more control. He appointed Sayyid Muhammad and his brother Sayyid Hussain Nasirabadi to oversee a supreme appellate court. He also appointed Sayyid Muhammad as head of the tax department. Influenced by the ulama, he ordered the closure of taverns, hashish shops, and houses of male prostitution in Lucknow. Historian J. R. I. Cole writes that these measures were also an attempt to curb Hindu dominance of commerce in Awadh.

During his reign, Amjad Ali Shah made more charitable funds available to the mujtahids than any of his predecessors. He arranged to have the government of Awadh to contribute 2.5 percent of its annual revenues as Shi'i poor tax (zakat) which were paid to the Sayyid brothers for distribution. He also provided funding for a Shi'i seminary.

== Relations with East India Company ==
Because Amjad Ali Shah delegated governance to others, there was widespread corruption within his administration and disenchantment among the zamindars. The Resident of Awadh started holding durbars of his own, in parallel with those held by the nawab.

For the first two years of his reign, the administration suffered from the constant churn of viziers, largely due to interference from the British East India Company. His wazirs during this period included Ashraf-ud-Daula; Imdad Hussain Khan (Ameen-ud-Daula); Munawar-ud-Daula; and then Ameen-ud-Daula a second time.

When the East India Company was overextended during the First Anglo-Sikh War, it sought assistance from Amjad Ali Shah, who provided an army contingent and a loan.

== Public works ==
His administration was responsible for the completion of the iron bridge over the river Gomti and a metalled road from Lucknow to Kanpur. He also built the Hazratganj and Aminabad Bazar, major shopping markets in Lucknow.

== Later life and death ==
The year before he died, Amjad Ali Shah fell in love with the 16-year-old daughter of a greengrocer. In November 1846, he married her and gave her the title Sultan Mahal.

He died of cancer on 13 February 1847. He is buried at Imambara Sibtainabad in the western part of Hazratganj, Lucknow. He was succeeded by his son Wajid Ali Shah.

== Notes ==
Preceded by Mo`in ad-Din Abu´l-Fath Mohammad 'Ali Shah	Padshah-e-Oudh, Shah-e Zaman; 7 May 1842 – 13 February 1847	Succeeded by Naser ad-Din 'Abd al-Mansur Mohammad Wajed 'Ali Shah
