= Paddington Old Cemetery =

Cemetery in London, England

Coordinates: 51.539°N 0.205°W

Paddington Old Cemetery is a civic cemetery that opened in 1855. It is located in Willesden Lane, Kilburn, in the London Borough of Brent. It is also known as Paddington Cemetery or Willesden Lane Cemetery. It is Grade II listed, Entry Number:1001542.

== History ==
In 1855 Paddington Burial Board purchased 24 acres of rural land in Willesden. Cemetery designer Thomas Little created a horse-shoe tree-lined path layout. On each side of the entrance he built lodges and in the centre, two Gothic-style chapels (grade II listed, Entry Number:1359002). Its original formation was in a rural landscape which later became a green open space. There is a war memorial by the western entrance; there are graves for casualties of World War I and World War II. The Goetze Memorial (c. 1911), erected by artist Sigismund Goetze in memory of his parents, is Grade II listed, Entry Number:1389534.

By 1923 the cemetery was rapidly becoming filled, and the Metropolitan Borough of Paddington decided to acquire new land for a cemetery further out of London. This was opened as "Paddington New Cemetery" (now known as Mill Hill Cemetery) in 1936, leading to the site on Willesden Lane becoming known by its current name of "Paddington Old Cemetery".

The City of Westminster sold the cemetery to Brent Council in 1986 and still manages it today (2000). Paddington Cemetery received a Special Commendation in the 'Cemetery of the Year Awards' in 1999, the cemetery office being praised for their work in reinstating the cemetery from closed status to local use. To celebrate the Millennium in 2000 new trees were planted and there is an apiary within the cemetery that produces 'Tombstone honey'.

== War graves ==
The cemetery contains 207 war graves of Commonwealth service personnel of World War I, of which 130 are buried in a Services Plot and 50 whose graves could not be marked are listed on a Screen Wall memorial. The Commonwealth War Graves Commission also registers and maintains 4 Commonwealth service burials of World War II and 43 non-war burials.

== Notable burials ==
- Edward Spencer Beesly (1831–1915) an English positivist and historian; President of the London Positivist Society from 1878 to 1900
- Michael Bond (1926–2017) a British author best known for his Paddington Bear books.
- Jabez Burns (1805–1876) a temperance reformer and preacher.
- Lieutenant-General Sir William Franklyn (1856-1914), senior British Army officer.
- Orlando Jewitt (1799–1869) a British architectural wood-engraver.
- Norman Kerr (1834–1899) a physician who in 1879 founded the Society for the Study and Cure of Inebriety and was the first president.
- Danny Maher (1881–1916) was an American Hall of Fame jockey who also became a Champion jockey in Great Britain.
- Princess Omdutel (d. 1858), infant granddaughter of Malika Kishwar, Queen Mother of Oudh (Awadh)
- Arthur Orton (1834–1898) who claimed to be Sir Roger Tichborne, who had been lost at sea in 1854, to claim his inheritance.
- Cuthbert Ottaway (1850–1878) a pioneer English footballer.
- Dr Severin Wielobycki (1793–1893) homeopath

== Gallery ==
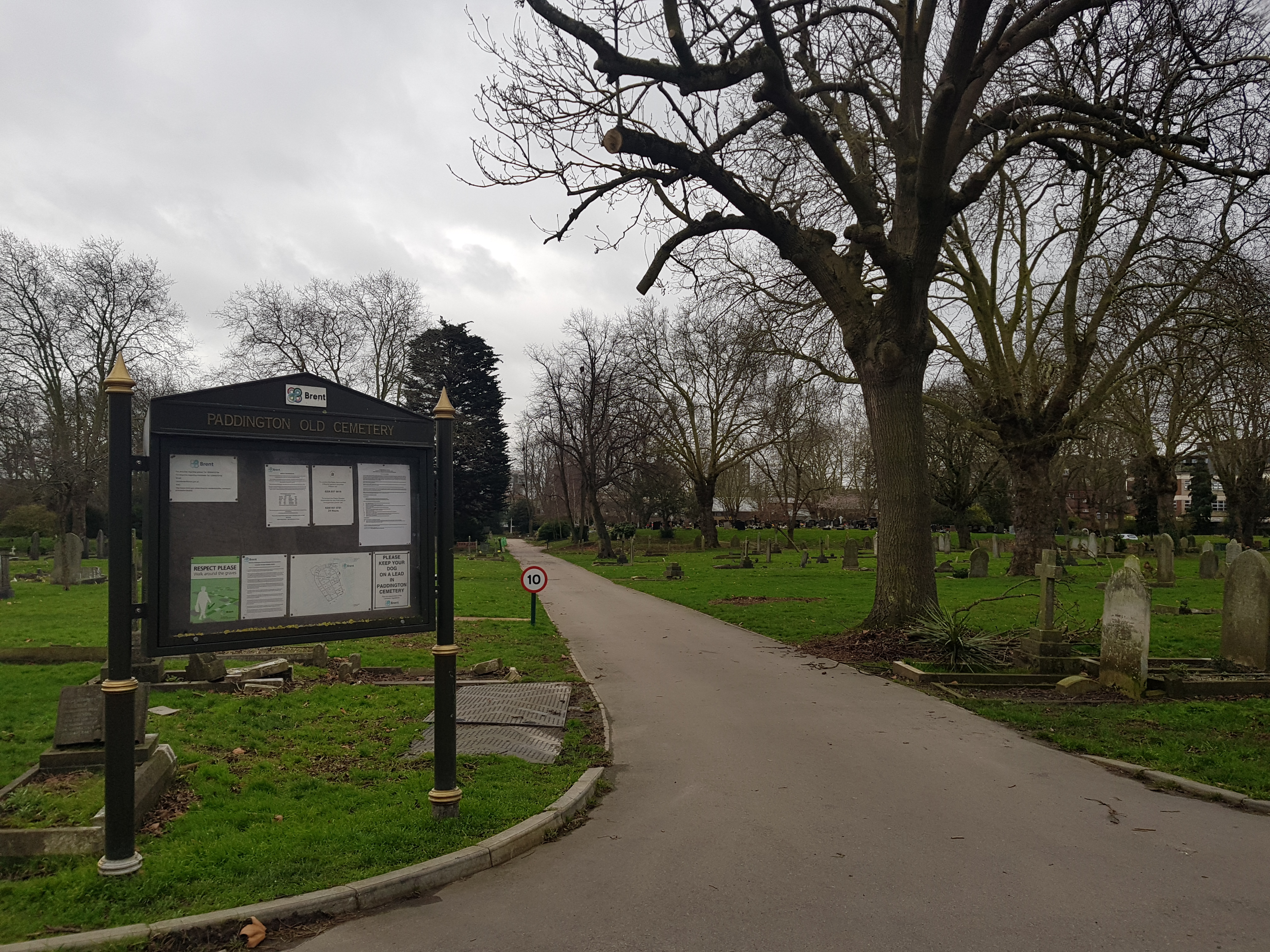
Paddington Old Cemetery

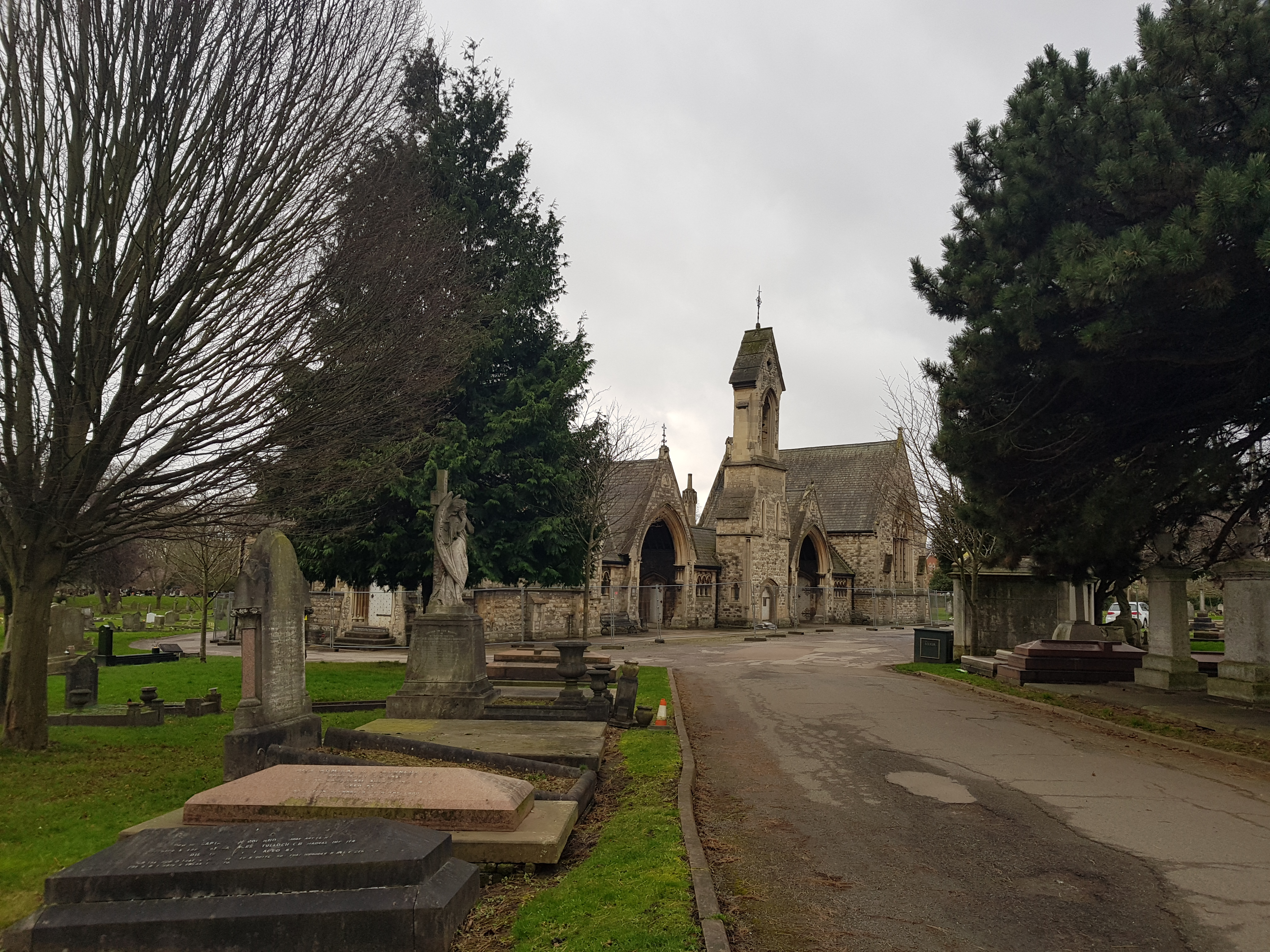
Paddington Old Cemetery

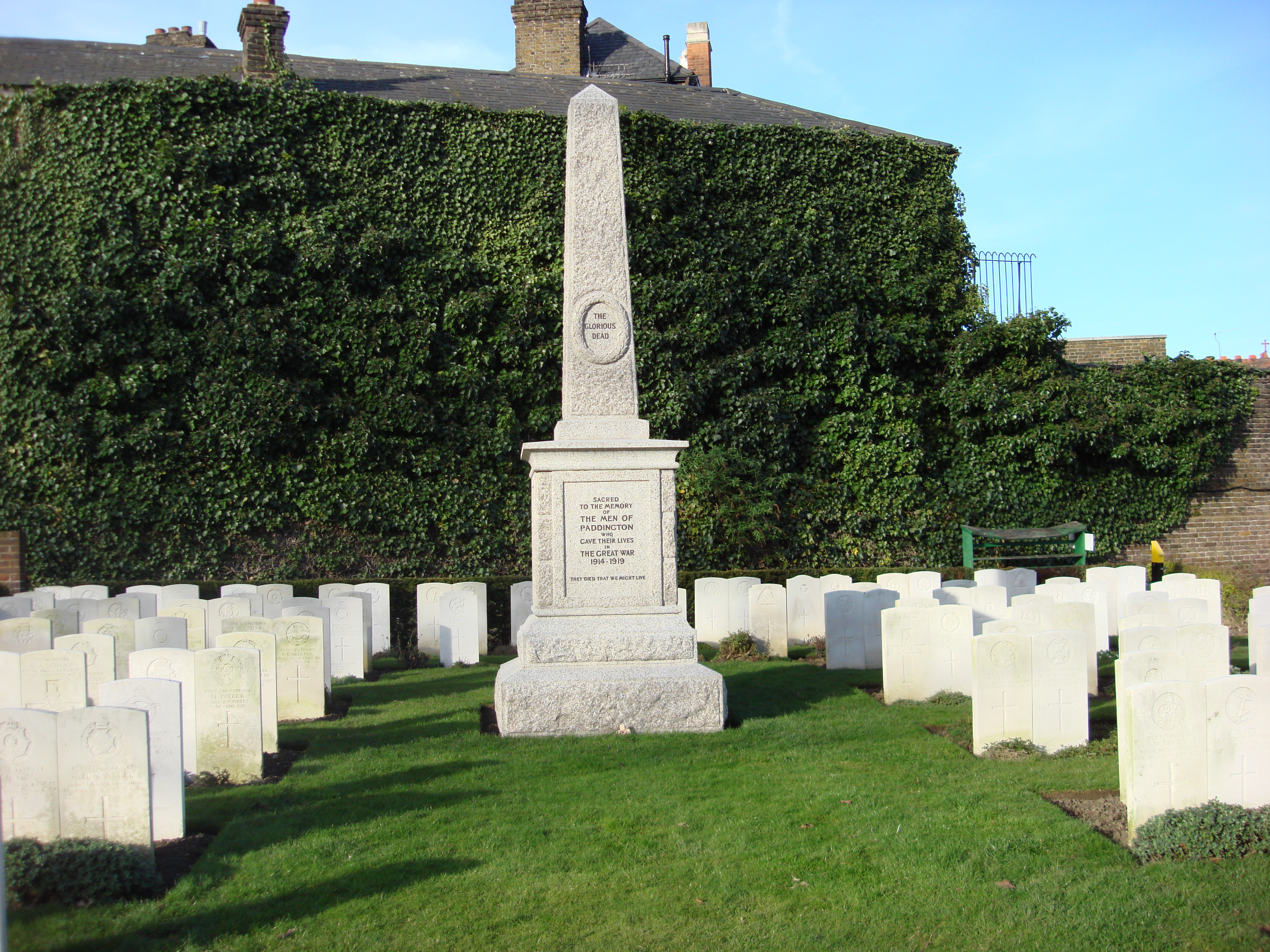
War Memorial

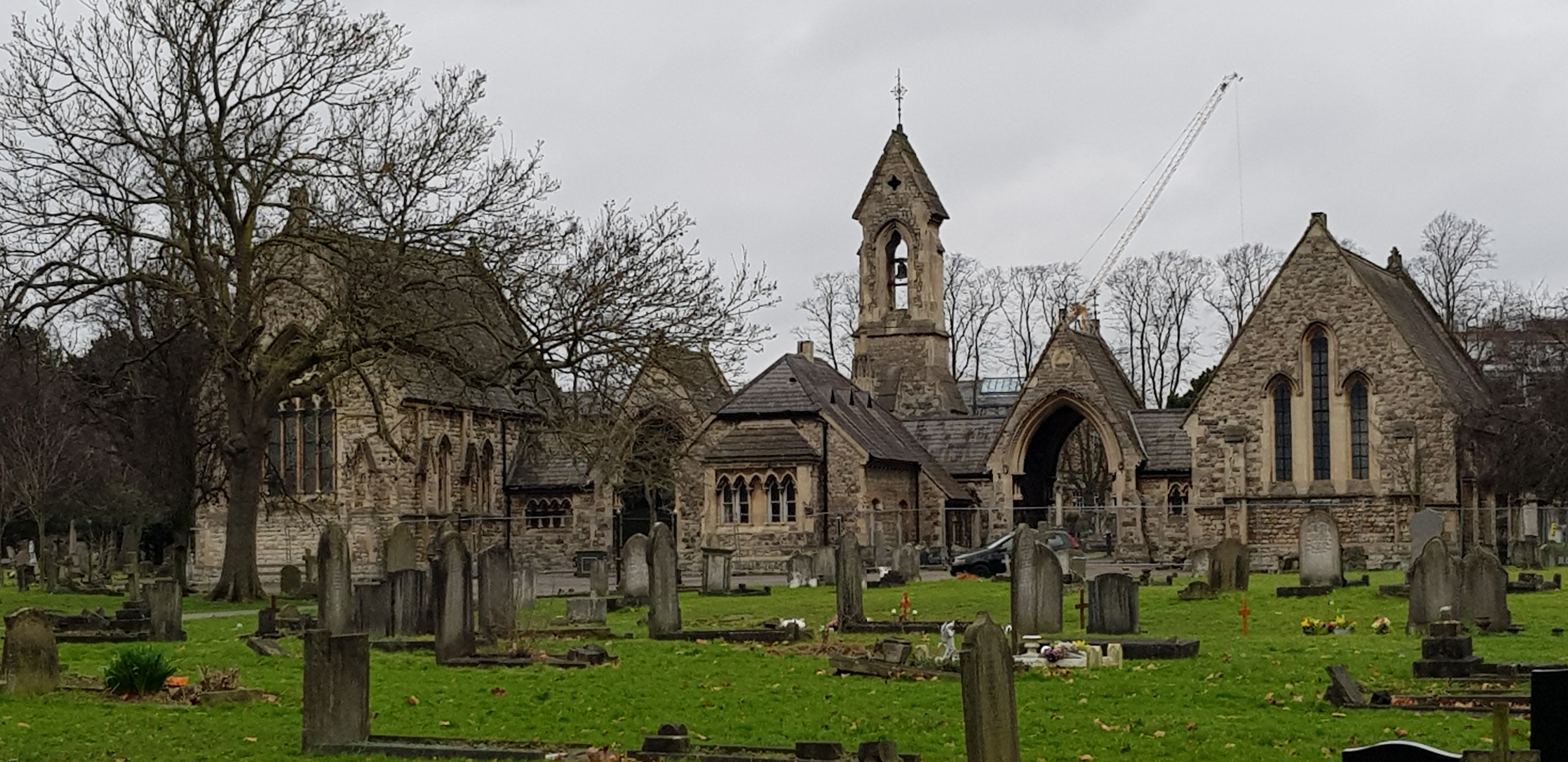
Chapels

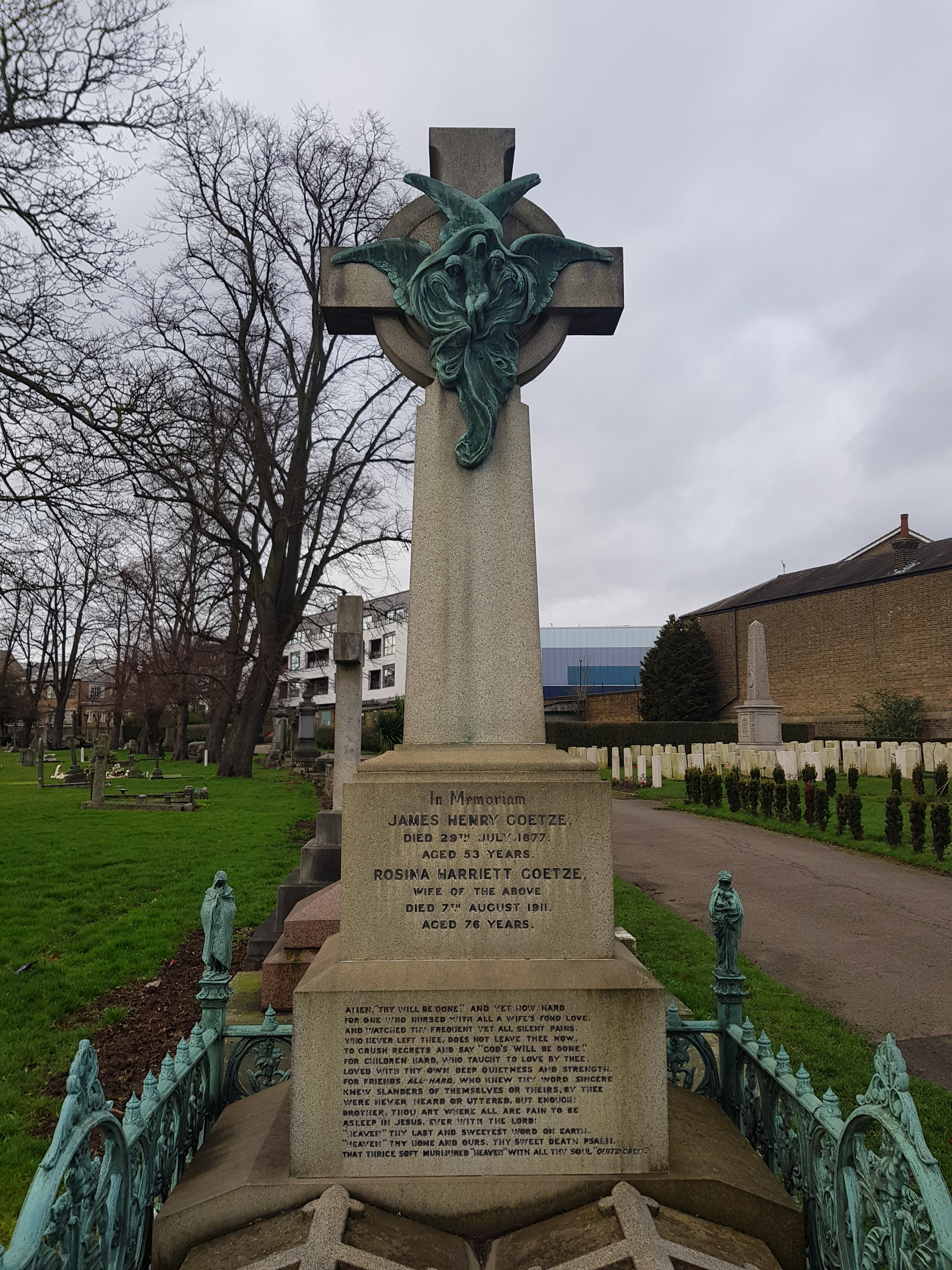
Goetze Grave
