= Severin Wielobycki =

Polish doctor and homeopath (1793–1893)

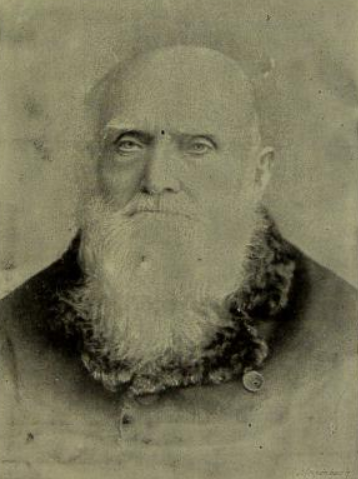
- Portrait from Fifty Years of Food Reform (1898)
- Born: 8 January 1793; Volhynia
- Died: 7 September 1893 (aged 100); St John's Wood, London, England
- Resting place: Paddington Cemetery
- Occupation: Physician
- Spouse: Helen Reith (m. 1861)

Severin Wielobycki (8 January 1793 – 7 September 1893) was a Polish centenarian physician who lived in Edinburgh and London. A controversial homeopath during a period of scientific focus, his adventurous life ranged from being a soldier in the Kraków Uprising and being a noted botanist, vegetarian, non-smoker and teetotaller. He was fluent in Polish, German, French, Russian and English.

== Life ==
Wielobycki was born on 8 January 1793 in Volhynia. The first son of Sophie Soboloska and Stanislaw Wielobycki, a judge. They initially lived in Wolyn in what is now Ukraine but moved west to a section which is now Poland (but was then German territory) in 1793 in or near Kraków in Silesia. This lies in the much disputed Danzig corridor where ownership has frequently passed between Germany and Poland.

In 1830/31 he and his whole family took arms in a local fight for independence from Germany and recognition of their Polish identity. He served as a captain in this resistance movement leading the Volvnian Cavalry Volunteers. Severin himself took place in 36 battles during the uprising and was one of the most prominent persons in the rebellion. Defeated he was offered the option of going to Britain rather than face imprisonment and he did this in 1831, sailing to Leith and probably staying there. He was in great poverty at this time. Records note that he was deafened by his military action. In Leith he taught French to earn a living.

In 1839, his brother Dionysius Wielobycki who had escaped from prison in Kraków, joined him in Leith. He initially made a living teaching French (which was more in demand than Polish or German.

In 1841, he enrolled at the University of Edinburgh with his brother, both studying medicine. They received their doctorate (MD) in 1843. They were both given Licentiates of the Royal College of Physicians of Edinburgh (LRCPE). They initially worked together with a homeopathic practice at 59 Queen Street.

Unlike Dionysius, who stayed in Edinburgh, Severin decided to emigrate to Canada. He lived in Nova Scotia from 1845 to 1851. He then moved to London and had a successful career as a homeopath there. In London he lived variously at Connaught Terrace, 11 Russell Place and 4 Denmark Hill.

In the 1861 census he appears in lodgings at 25 Montagu Street in Edinburgh. Later that year he married (see below).

He retired in 1865 and moved to 1 Alma Villas in Leicester where Dionysus had been living since 1862 (when he was released from prison). When Dionysius returned to Edinburgh in 1871 Severin returned to London, living in Marylebone.

His health was excellent until 1890 and he would take a daily 12 mile walk to Primrose Hill. In 1890 a bout of influenza broke his health.

The Society for the Study of Inebriety marked his 100th birthday with a party in January 1893. He served as their Vice president 1892/3.

He died on 7 September 1893 at his home at 4 Eaton Villas in St John's Wood aged 100 and 8 months. He is buried in Paddington Cemetery.

A member of multiple societies he belonged to the Vegetarian Society, Hahnemann Institute, the Botanical Society of Edinburgh, the Hunterian Society, the Medical Society of Edinburgh, the Physical Society of Edinburgh and the British Homeopathic Society.

== Vegetarianism ==
Wielobycki delivered a speech in March, 1893 that revealed he was a life-long teetotaller and vegetarian for seventeen years. He was vice-president of the Vegetarian Society and of the National Food Reform Society.

Wielobycki attributed his longevity to abstinence from alcohol, animal food and tobacco.

== Family ==
In 1861 he married a Scottish widow, Helen Reith (b. 1813), of 48 Hanover Street in the town centre of Edinburgh.
