= Iron Bridge, Lucknow =

Bridge over Gomti River, Lucknow (1845–1960)

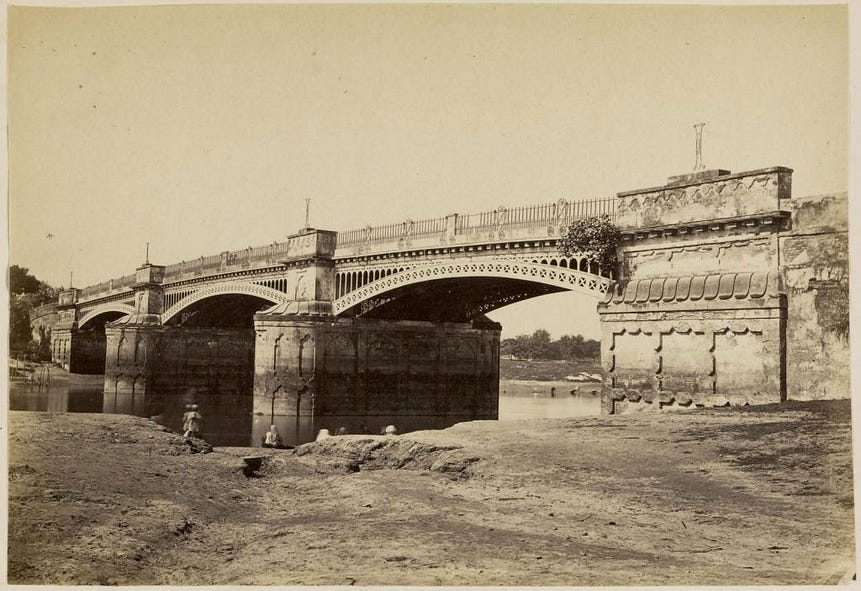
- Iron Bridge, Lucknow in 1874
- Coordinates: 26°52′5″N 80°55′30″E
- Crossed: River Gomti
- Locale: Lucknow, Uttar Pradesh, India
- Followed by: Masonry bridge

Characteristics
- Material: Cast iron
- No. of spans: 3
- Piers in water: 2

History
- Designer: John Rennie
- Construction end: 1844–1845
- Destroyed: c. 1960

Location
- Interactive map of Iron Bridge, Lucknow

The Iron Bridge over the Gomti River in Lucknow, Uttar Pradesh, was one of the earliest iron bridges in India, erected in 1845. Originally designed by British civil engineer John Rennie, the cast-iron sections were manufactured by Butterley Company of Derbyshire, England, between 1812 and 1814, and shipped to Calcutta, finally arriving in Lucknow in 1816. (Note: Although several early sources gave the year as 1798, historical records confirm that the cast iron parts were not manufactured and shipped until later, arriving in Lucknow in 1816.) By then, Saadat Ali Khan, the nawab of Awadh who had commissioned the bridge, had died, and the project was put on hold.

Work on the project resumed in the 1840s, and by 1844, engineers working with the British East India Company had developed a revised plan for laying the foundations and constructing the bridge, altering its site and height and incorporating knowledge gained from other engineering works in the intervening decades. The plan was executed by Colonel Fraser of the Bengal Engineers between 1844 and 1845, during the reign of king Amjad Ali Shah. In 1857 and 1858, the iron bridge was the site of armed conflict during the Indian Rebellion. Severely damaged by floods in 1960, it was dismantled and eventually replaced by a masonry bridge at Daliganj.

== Description ==
In 1877, The Roorkee Treatise on Civil Engineering in India described it as a "graceful structure [consisting] of three cast-iron arches supported on piers and abutments of brick masonry". The centre arch had a span of 90 feet (27 m) and a rise of 7 feet (2.1 m). The two arches on either side each had a span of 80 feet (24 m) and a rise of 6 feet (1.8 m).

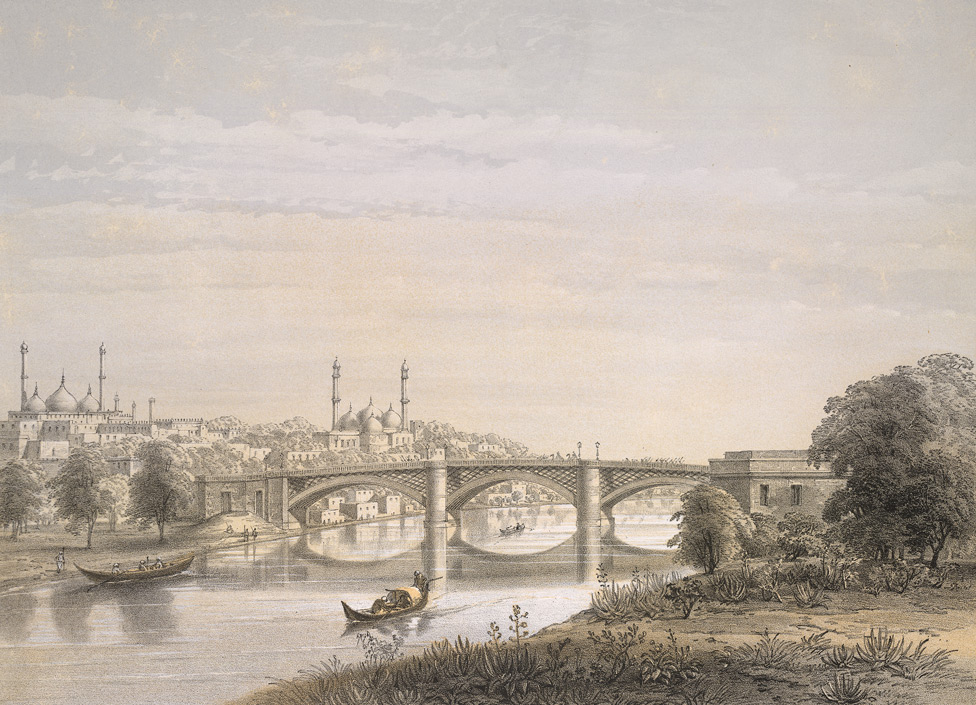
Iron Bridge from the left bank looking upstream

== History ==
Saadat Ali Khan, the sixth nawab of Awadh, considered building a new bridge across the "River Goomty" from early in his reign, around the turn of the century. In 1810, Captain Duncan McLeod of the Bengal Engineers carried out a survey to assess the feasibility of such a project. McLeod recommended against using wood for the deck due to the climate as well as the fact that "elephants are a common mode of conveyance in this country". When commissioning the cast iron bridge, Saadat Ali Khan also commissioned a steam engine to clear the coffer dams during construction.

=== Design by John Rennie ===
British civil engineer John Rennie, a consultant to the East India Company, designed the architectural aspects of the iron bridge of Lucknow around the same time he was working on the Waterloo Bridge in London. He modelled the Lucknow plan on a bridge he had designed over the River Witham at Boston, Lincolnshire, completed around 1803, noting that the latter had "since stood many severe trials, and proves perfectly stable". A key difference was his incorporation of elements "in the style of Indian architecture".

Additional input on the connection of the arched ribs came from the Butterley Company (later part of Jessop & Company) of Ripley, Derbyshire, while William Daniell contributed to the final ornamentation.

=== Manufacture by Butterley Ironworks ===
Between 1812 and 1814, the Butterley Ironworks cast more than 2,500 pieces for the bridge. The iron sections were placed on two cargo ships departing from the port of Hull and arrived in Calcutta in 1816. An engineer Henry Jessop was charged with the assembly of the bridge in Lucknow. Of the 2,627 pieces that were offloaded, only 19 had arrived broken. At the time, it was the largest single manufactured export from Great Britain.

However, by the time the parts finally arrived in Lucknow, Saadat Ali Khan had died. His son and successor Ghazi-ud-Din Haidar Shah, the seventh nawab and first king of Awadh, opposed the entire project. Although the traditional explanation given is that Ghazi-ud-Din Haidar felt that his father's iron bridge project was unlucky, a more recent analysis suggests that he opposed the direct connection it would create between the British East India Company's Madiaon cantonment and the city of Lucknow.

The eighth nawab, his son Nasir-ud-Din Haidar Shah, directed his court engineer Sinclair to assemble and erect the iron bridge. The iron sections were stacked on the river bank, opposite The Residency, Lucknow. Sinclair dug wells in the river bed and started sinking pillars for the foundation, but failed.

=== Construction and completion ===
In 1839, the ninth nawab of Awadh and uncle of his predecessor, Muhammad Ali Shah, allocated one lakh (100,000) rupees for the construction of the iron bridge that had been commissioned by his father, Saadat Ali Khan.

In October 1840, Lieutenant Cunningham observed that the Gomti River had risen 2 feet (0.61 m) higher than when the bridge had originally been designed, requiring the piers to be higher than planned. He noted that he would not be able to determine the best spot to erect the bridge until the tide was lower. He also mentioned that there was a shortage of timbers longer than 20 feet (6.1 m), which meant that construction of centerings for the bridge would be delayed. By 1844, the plan for building the foundations had been revised significantly, using the Indian system of well-foundations combined with modern piles that British engineers had been using in other projects, as well as the coffer dams Rennie had designed. Construction of the bridge took place from 1844 to 1845.

In 1845, the iron bridge of Lucknow was finally completed by Colonel Fraser of the Bengal Engineers during the reign of the tenth nawab and fourth king of Awadh, Amjad Ali Shah. At the time, it was one of three bridges on the Gomti River. The other two bridges were near the Macchi Mahal and the Nao Ka Pul pontoon bridge near Moti Mahal.

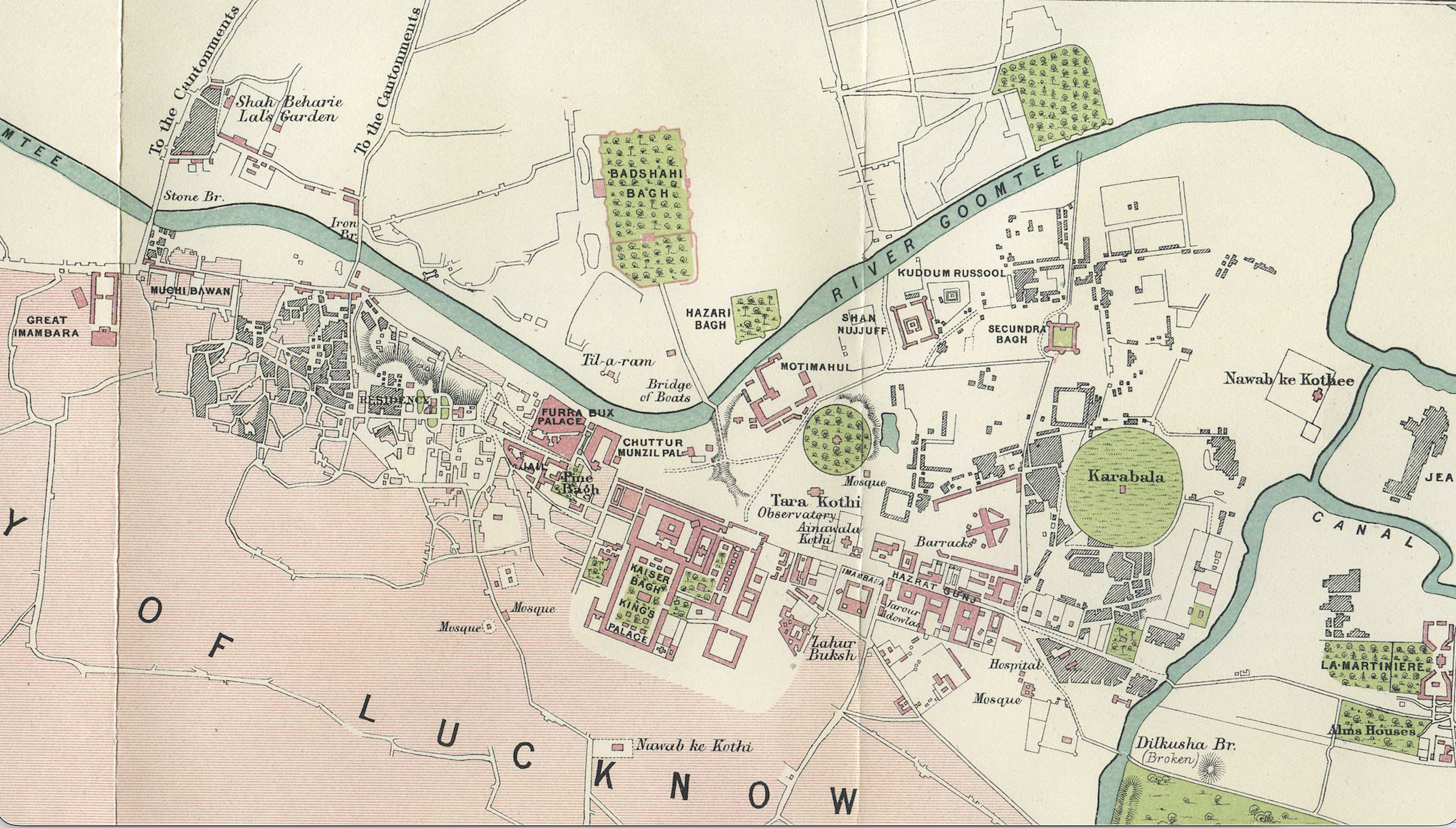
Map of Lucknow and the Gomti River in 1857

=== Indian rebellion of 1857 ===
The iron bridge was 1/4 mile (0.40 km) from The Residency of Lucknow on the right bank of the Gomti River. During the Indian Rebellion of 1857, the iron bridge became a point of conflict between British forces and mutineers, as each side struggled for control over Lucknow.

On 30 June 1857, British forces led by Sir Henry Lawrence retreated via the iron bridge to the Residency following their defeat in the Battle of Chinhat. A company of infantry that had not been at Chinhat helped their escape by preventing rebel forces from crossing the bridge in pursuit.

On 29 September 1857, a detachment of British officers and soldiers from the 84th, 64th, and 32nd Regiments, and the 5th Fusiliers proceeded toward the iron bridge, stormed a house close to it, and destroyed a cannon which had been captured in Chinhat and used against them during the Siege of Lucknow. Although they had initially driven rebel forces across the river, they failed to occupy the nearby houses; the houses were eventually retaken by returning rebels, who killed or wounded one-third of the British detachment and forced them to retreat.

On 11 March 1858, General James Outram led a corps of infantry, cavalry, and guns to Lucknow, with instructions to take control of both the iron bridge and the stone bridge over the River Gomti. He succeeded in taking command of the northern end of the iron bridge on the left bank. Outram proposed crossing the iron bridge toward the Residency, but was forbidden by the commander-in-chief to do so, "if he thought he would lose a single man". Instead, on 16 March 1858, Outram crossed the Gumti over a bridge of casks near the Sikandar Bagh and proceeded to the Residency to take the iron bridge in reverse.

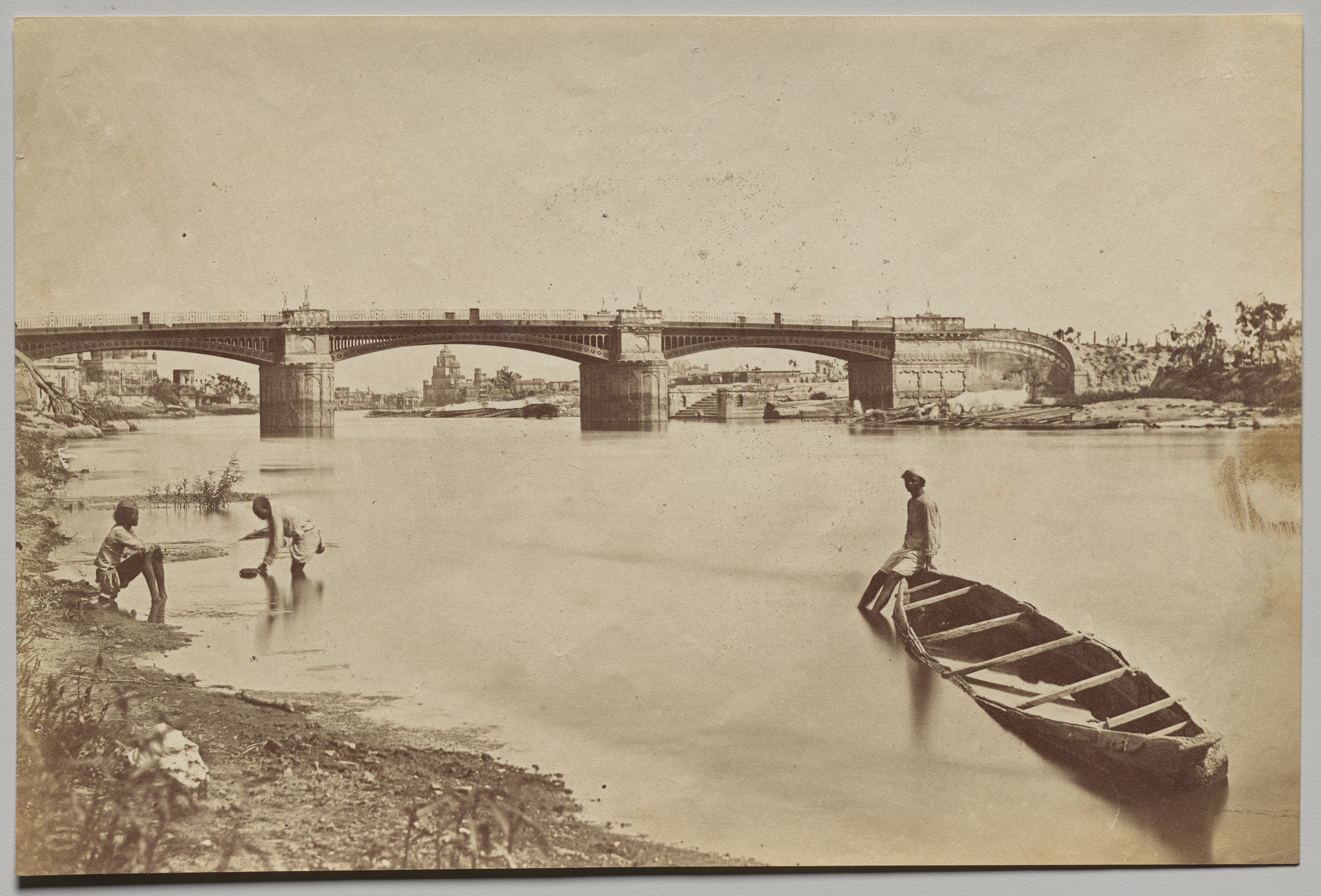
Iron Bridge, Lucknow in 1858

== See also ==
- List of bridges in India
- Sagar Iron Suspension Bridge
- Iron Bridge (Thrippunithura)
- Howrah Bridge
