= Oudh Bequest =

The Oudh Bequest is a waqf which led to the gradual transfer of more than six million rupees from the Indian kingdom of Oudh (Awadh) to the Shia holy cities of Najaf and Karbala between 1850 and 1903. The bequest first reached the cities in 1850. It was distributed by two mujtahids, one from each city. The British later gradually took over the bequest and its distribution; according to scholars, they intended to use it as a "power lever" to influence Iranian ulama and Shia. The attempts by the British to disburse the Oudh Bequest was one of the principle causes of the rise of the Society of Islamic Revival in 1918.

== Background ==
In 1825, when Burma experienced economic problems, Oudh king Ghazi al-Din Haydar supported the British East India Company with a 10-million-rupee loan. Although its principal did not have to be repaid, the loan's five-percent annual interest had to be applied to specific objects (including four women: Nawwab Mubarak Mahal, Sultan Maryam Begam, Mumtaz Mahal, and Sarfaraz Mahal, who received 10,000, 2,500, 1,100 and 1,000 rupees per month respectively). Others, including servants and associates of Sarfaraz Mahal, were to receive 929 rupees. After the women's deaths, two-thirds of the allowance (or all of it in case of "intestacy") would be given to mujtahids in Najaf and Karbala for it to reach "deserving persons". This financial aid was known as the Oudh Bequest.

The maximum amount the cities could receive was 186,148 rupees when one British pound equalled about 10 rupees. The first portion of the Oudh Bequest reached Najaf and Karbala around 1850, after Maryam Begam and Sultan Mahal's deaths. About 120,000 rupees (£10,000) annually reached the cities by the end of the 1850s.

== Administration ==
From its beginning in 1850, two Iraqi religious leaders (Sayyid Ali Naqi al-Tabatabie and Morteza Ansari) transferred the bequest from India through agents. Morteza Ansari had devised a mode of distribution which included "junior mujtahids, low-ranking indigent ulama, Persian and Arab students, the custodians of the shrines, and the poor." Although Ansari was involved in the bequest's distribution, he withdrew in 1860 "presumably" to avoid a close relationship with the British and was replaced by Sayid Ali Bahr al-Ulum as the distributor for Najaf. Bahr al-Ulum and al-Tabatabie made the distributions until 1903.

That year, on the eve of the Persian Constitutional Revolution, the British became involved in distributing the bequest. It was decided by the Indian government to change the distribution system because of allegations of misuse. Under the new system, the fund was distributed by British agents in the two cities to a group of ten mujtahids in each city. Although the alleged misuse was the rationale behind the distribution-system change, another factor may have been a British goal to influence Iranian politics through the shrine cities' ulama. A few opposed the bequest's British involvement, but many ulama "benefited" from it. In 1912 the British took over the bequest's distribution, shifting from a policy of leverage in Iran to "acquiring goodwill" from the Shia Muslims in India and "enhancing their prestige" in Iraq.

== British political usage ==
Arthur Henry Hardinge, the British consul general in Tehran at the time, called the Oudh Bequest a "powerful lever" for promoting "good relations" with him and the Persian clerics. According to the British, the bequest was "a means to enhance their influence over the ulama in Iran" enabling the British to establish Ottoman territory and Qajar Iran as "buffer zones to protect British India". To use this "leverage", two British officials (Ramsay and Lorimer) tried to give more power to British residents of Baghdad by persuading the Indian government between 1909 and 1911. Najaf and Karbala ulamas were encouraged to interfere in Iranian internal affairs. The British also tried to force Iranian ulama to move against the "Russian second loan".

According to some scholars, the British used the Oudh Bequest to manipulate the Shia by determining the mujtahids in the two shrine cities. However, British authorities could not influence Morteza Ansari through the bequest.

== Result ==
According to Meir Litvak, the British attempts ended in "dismal failure" and proved that charity cannot replace "the need of religious leaders to maintain popular support by distancing themselves from foreign patronage and tutelage". Suri Pasa, the vali of Iraq at the time, expressed concern at the growth of Shia and linked it to the Oudh Bequest.
