= Oudh State =

Polity in the Awadh region of North India (1732–1856)

Coordinates: 26.78°N 82.13°E

Oudh Awadh
- 1572–1856
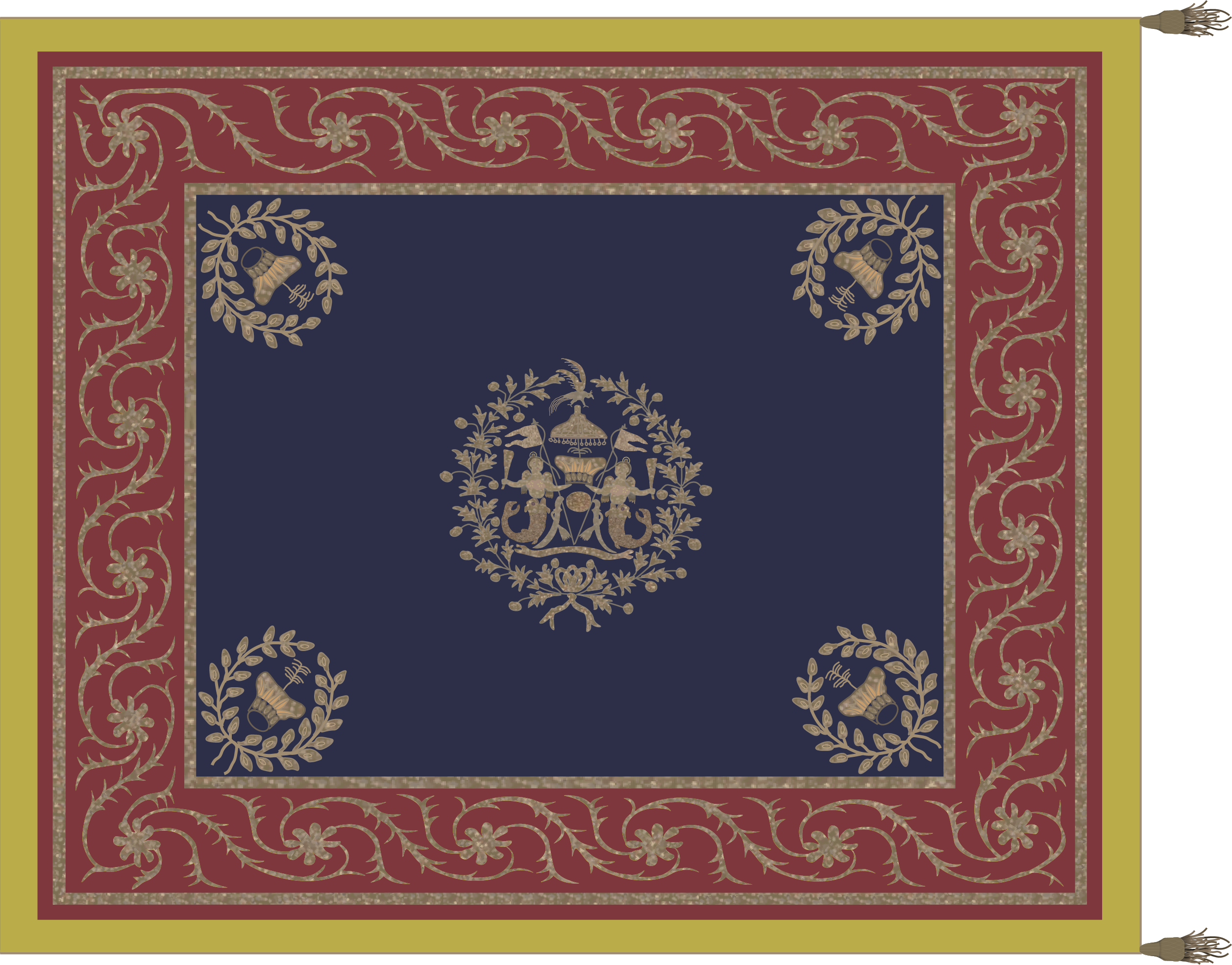
- Flag Coat of arms

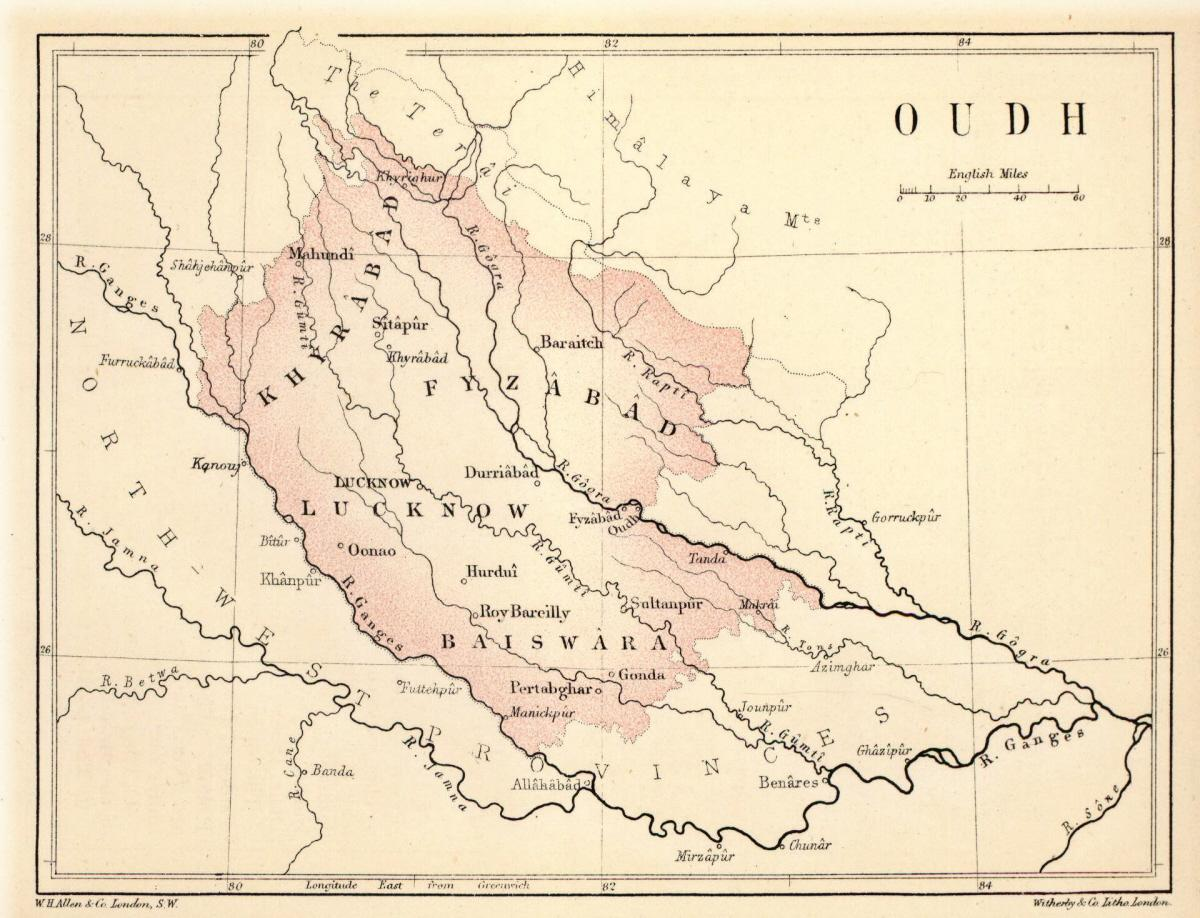
- The Kingdom of Oudh in 1856 (red)
- Capital: Ayodhya (1722–1740); Faizabad (1740–1775); Lucknow (1775–1858)
- Common languages: Persian (official), Awadhi (regional), Bhojpuri (regional), Hindustani
- Religion: Shia Islam (official), Hinduism (majority), Sunni Islam, Jainism, Buddhism, Sikhism, Christianity
- Government: Mughal subah (1572–1722); Feudal absolute monarchy (1722–1816); Feudal absolute monarchy as a British protectorate (1816–1856)
- Nawab/Padshah
  - 1722–1739: Saadat Ali Khan I (first)
  - 1847–1856: Wajid Ali Shah (last)
- Subahdar
  - 1722: Girdhar Bahadur (last)
- History
  - Independence from Mughal Empire: 26 January 1722
  - Annexation of Oudh: 1856
  - Siege of Cawnpore: 5 – 25 June 1857
  - Oudh campaign: 3 March 1858
  - Merger of Oudh to North-Western Provinces: 1859

Area
  - 1601: 26,463 sq mi (68,540 km^{2})
- Currency: Indian Rupee
Preceded by	Succeeded by
Mughal Empire; Illahabad Subah	North-Western Provinces and Oudh; Benares State

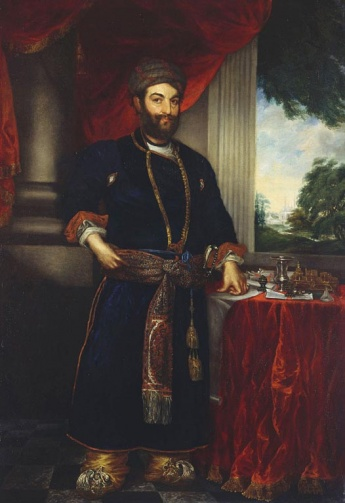
Nawab Saadat Ali Khan II.

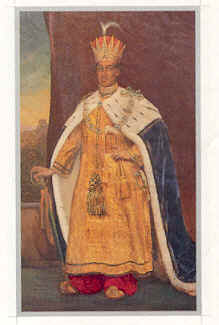
Nawab Nasiruddin Haider

The Oudh State (English: /ˈaʊd/, Hindi: [ˈəʋədʱ], also Kingdom of Awadh, Kingdom of Oudh, Awadh Subah, Oudh Subah, or Awadh State) was a Mughal subah, then an independent kingdom, and lastly a British protectorate in the Awadh region of North India until its annexation by the British East India Company in 1856. The name Oudh, now obsolete, was once the anglicized name of the state, also written historically as Oudhe.

As the Mughal Empire declined and decentralized, local governors in Oudh began asserting greater autonomy, and eventually Oudh matured into an independent polity governing the fertile lands of the Central and Lower Doab.

The capital of Oudh was in Faizabad, but the company's Political Agents, officially known as "Residents", had their seat in Lucknow. At par existed a Maratha embassy, in the Oudh court, led by the Vakil of the Peshwa, until the Second Anglo-Maratha War. The Nawab of Oudh, one of the richest princes, paid for and erected a Residency in Lucknow as a part of a wider programme of civic improvements.

Oudh joined other Indian states in an upheaval against British rule in 1858 during one of the last series of actions in the Indian rebellion of 1857. In the course of this uprising, detachments of the Bombay Army of the East India Company overcame the disunited collection of Indian states in a single rapid campaign. Determined rebels continued to wage sporadic guerrilla clashes until the spring of 1859. This rebellion is also historically known as the Oudh campaign.

After the British annexation of Oudh by the Doctrine of Lapse, the North Western Provinces became the North Western Provinces and Oudh.

== History ==
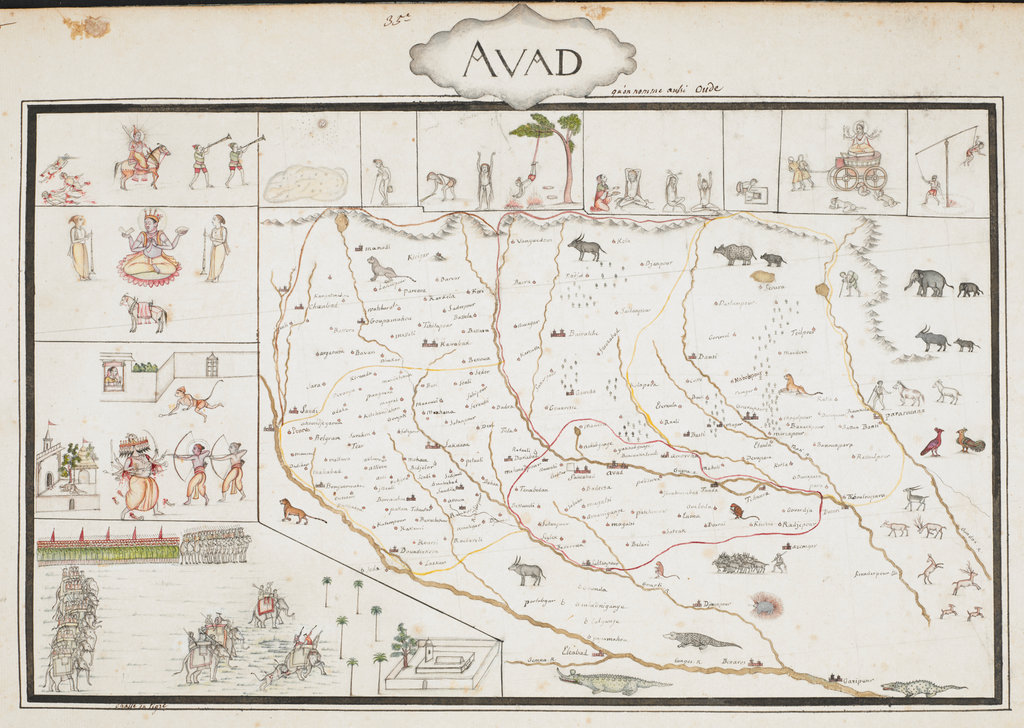
Elaborately illustrated map of the Awadh Subah of the Mughal Empire, commissioned by Jean Baptiste Joseph Gentil, ca.1770

Oudh Subah was one of the initial 12 subahs (later expanded to 15 subahs by the end of Akbar's reign) established by Akbar during his administrative reforms of 1572–1580. A Mughal Subah was divided into Sarkars, or districts. Sarkars were further divided into Parganas or Mahals. Saadat Ali Khan I was appointed Subahdar of Oudh Subah on 9 September 1722, succeeding Girdhar Bahadur. He immediately subdued the autonomous Shaikhzadas of Lucknow and Raja Mohan Singh of Tiloi, consolidating Oudh as a state. In 1728, Oudh further acquired Varanasi, Jaunpur and surrounding lands from the Mughal noble Rustam Ali Khan and established stable revenue collection in that province after quelling the chief of Azamgarh, Mahabat Khan. In 1739 Saadat Khan mobilized Oudh to defend against Nader Shah's invasion of India, ultimately being captured in the Battle of Karnal. He attempted to negotiate with Nader Shah but died in Delhi.

=== Establishment ===
In 1740, his successor Safdar Jang moved the capital of the state from Ayodhya to Faizabad. Safdar Jang gained recognition from Persia after paying tribute. He continued Saadat Khan's expansionist policy, promising military protection to Bengal in exchange for the forts at Rohtasgarh and Chunar, and annexing portions of Farrukhabad with Mughal military aid which was ruled by Muhammad Khan Bangash.

As the Mughal Empire began to dissolve in the early 18th century, many subahs became effectively independent. As regional officials asserted their autonomy in Bengal and the Deccan as well as with the rise of the Maratha Empire, the rulers of Oudh gradually affirmed their own sovereignty. Safdar Jang went as far as to control the ruler of Delhi, putting Ahmad Shah Bahadur on the Mughal throne with the cooperation of other Mughal nobility. In 1748 he gained the subah of Allahabad with Ahmad Shah's official support. This was arguably the zenith of Oudh's territorial span.

The next nawab, Shuja-ud-Daula, extended Oudh's control of the Mughal emperor. He was appointed vazir to Shah Alam II in 1762 and offered him asylum after his failed campaigns against the British in the Bengal War.

=== British contact and control ===
Since Oudh was located in a prosperous region, the British East India Company soon took notice of the affluence in which the Nawabs of Oudh lived. Primarily, the British sought to protect the frontiers of Bengal and their lucrative trade there; only later did direct expansion occur.

==== Shuja-ud-Daula ====
British dominance was established at the Battle of Buxar of 1764, when the East India Company defeated the alliance between the nawab of Oudh Shuja-ud-Daula and the deposed nawab of Bengal Mir Kasim. The battle was a turning point for the once rising star of Oudh. The immediate effect was the British occupation of the fort at Chunar and the cession of the provinces of Kora and Allahabad to Mughal ruler Shah Alam II under the Treaty of Benares (1765). Shaja-ud-Daula further had to pay 5 million rupees as an indemnity, which was paid off in one year. The long-term result would be direct British interference in the internal state matters of Oudh, useful as a buffer state against the Marathas. The treaty also granted British traders special privileges and exemptions from many customs duties, which led to tensions as British monopolies were established.

Shuja-ud-Daula bought the Mughal provinces of Kora and Allahabad in the Treaty of Benares (1773) with the British (who held de facto control over the area) for 50 lakh rupees, increased the cost of Company mercenaries, and military aid in the First Rohilla War to expand Oudh as a buffer state against Maratha interests. Done by Warren Hastings, this move was unpopular among the rest of Company leadership, but Hastings continued a harsh policy on Oudh, justifying the military aid as a bid to strengthen Oudh's status as a buffer state against the Marathas. To shape the policy of Oudh and direct its internal affairs Hastings appointed the resident Nathaniel Middleton in Lucknow that year as well. At the conclusion of the First Rohilla War in 1774, Oudh gained the entirety of Rohilkhand and the Middle Doab region, only leaving the independent Rampur State as a Rohilla enclave.

==== Asaf-ud-Daula ====
Asaf-ud-Daula acceded to the nawabship of Oudh with British aid in exchange for the Treaty of Benares (1775) which further increased the cost of mercenaries and ceded the sarkars of Benares, Ghazipur, Chunar, and Jaunpur. From this time onwards, Oudh consistently complied with the company's demands, which continued to demand more land and economic control over the state.

The Treaty of Chunar (1781) sought to reduce the number of British troops in Oudh's service to cut costs, but failed in this measure due to the instability of Asaf-ud-Daula's rule and thus his reliance on British aid essentially as a puppet regime.

==== Later rulers ====
Saadat Ali Khan II acceded to the throne of Oudh in 1798, owing his seat to British intervention including Governor-General of Bengal Sir John Shore's personal proclamation in Lucknow of his rule. A treaty signed on 21 February 1798 increased the subsidy paid to the British to 70 lakh rupees per year.

In light of the Napoleonic Wars and British demands for greater revenue from the company, in 1801, Saadat Ali Khan II ceded the entire Rohilkhand and Lower Doab as well as the sarkar of Gorakhpur under the pressure of Lord Wellesley to the British in lieu of the annual tribute. The cession halved the size of the polity, reducing it to the original Mughal subah of Awadh (excepting Gorakhpur which was ceded) and surrounded it by directly administered British territory, rendering it useless as a buffer. The treaty also mandated a government to be put in place that primarily served the citizens of Oudh. It was on the basis of the failure to meet this demand that the British later justified the annexation of Oudh.

Farrukhabad and Rampur was not annexed by the British yet; instead, they served as separate princely states for the moment.

The kingdom became a British protectorate in May 1816. Three years later, in 1819, the Ghazi-ud-Din Haidar Shah took the title of Badshah (king), signaling formal independence from the Mughal Empire under the advice of the Marquis of Hastings.

Throughout the early 1800s until annexation, several areas were gradually ceded to the British.

=== British annexation ===
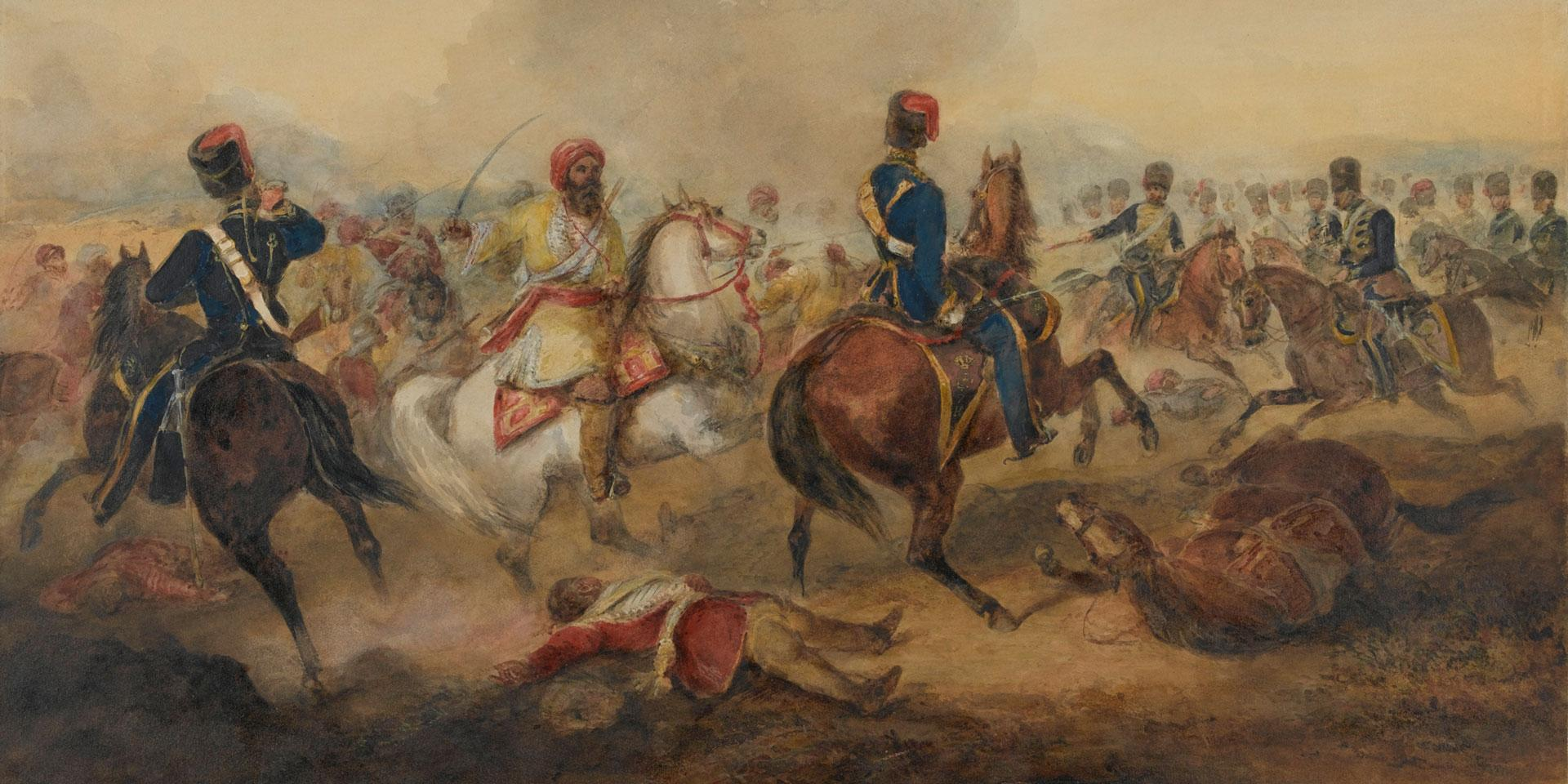
Mutineer's Cavalry at Alam Bagh, Lucknow

On 7 February 1856, by order of Governor-General Lord Dalhousie, the Nawab of Oudh, Wajid Ali Shah, was deposed, and Oudh State was annexed to the territories of the British East India Company under the terms of the Doctrine of lapse on the grounds of alleged internal misrule.

=== Indian Rebellion of 1857 ===
Between 5 July 1857 and 3 March 1858, during the Indian Rebellion of 1857, Begum Hazrat Mahal, the wife of Wajid Ali Shah proclaimed their son Birjis Qadr the Wali of Awadh and ruled as regent. At the time of the rebellion, the British lost control of the territory; they reestablished their rule over the next eighteen months, during which time there were massacres such as those that had occurred in the course of the Siege of Cawnpore.

After the rebellion, Oudh's territory was merged with the North Western Provinces, forming the larger province of North-Western Provinces and Oudh. In 1902, the latter was renamed the United Provinces of Agra and Oudh. In 1921, it became the United Provinces of British India. In 1937, it became the United Provinces and continued as a province in independent India until finally becoming the state of Uttar Pradesh in 1950.

== Government ==
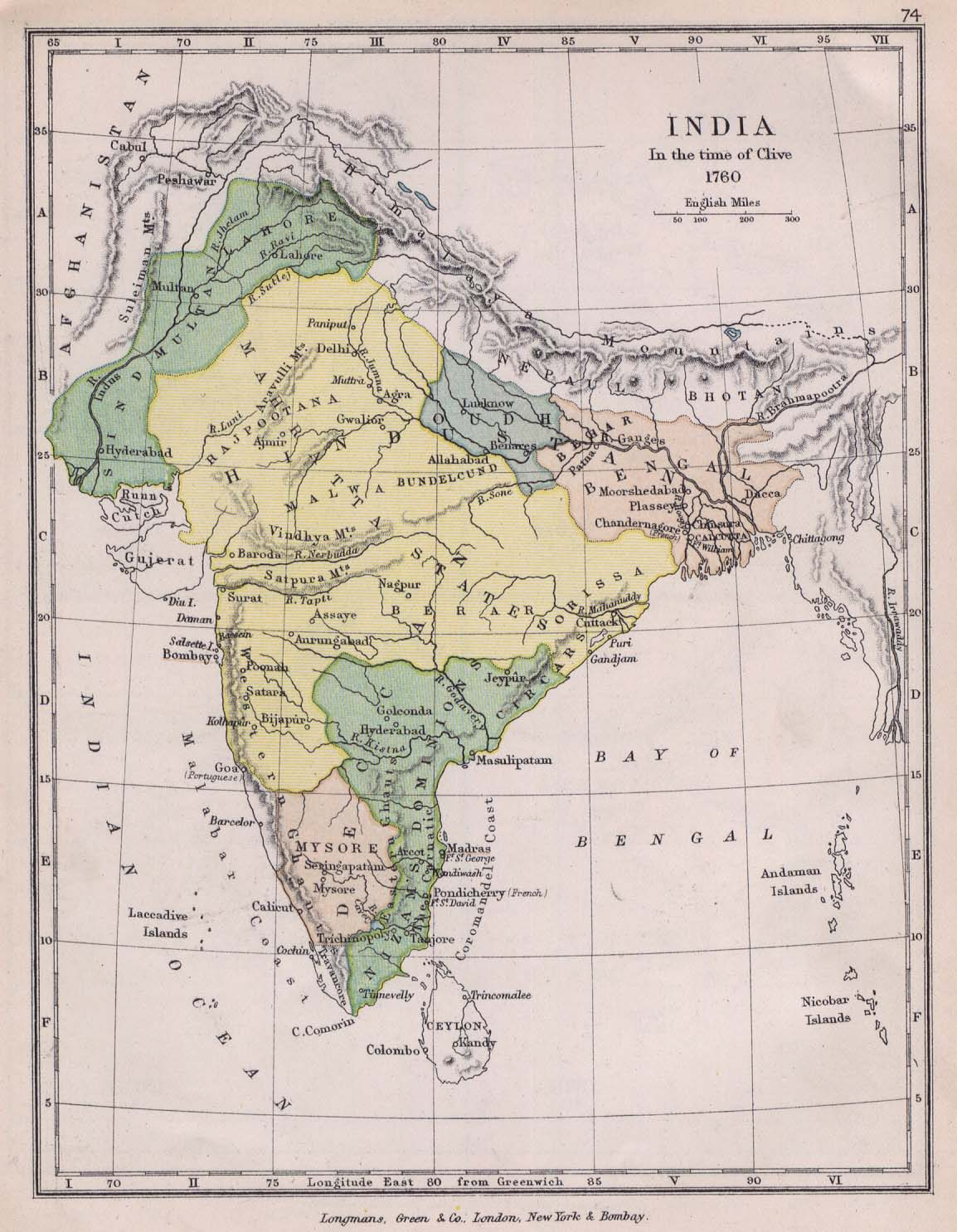
The fully-fledged state of Awadh

=== Feudatory states ===
The following were feudatory estates —taluqdaris or parganas— of Oudh:

- Amethi Estate
- Balrampur Estate
- Benares State until 1740
- Bhadri Estate
- Itaunja Estate
- Jahangirabad Estate
- Kohra Estate
- Mahmudabad Estate
- Nanpara Taluqdari
- Pratapgarh Estate
- Sarosi Estate
- Shahgarh Estate
- Tulsipur State

=== Subdvisions ===
At the time of its creation by Akbar, the Subah of Oudh consisted of 5 sarkars, further subdivided into 38 parganas:

Sarkar
Oudh
Gorakhpur
Bahraich
Khairabad
Lucknow

=== Rulers ===
The first ruler of Oudh State belonged to the Shia Muslim Sayyid Family and descended of Musa al-Kadhim originated from Nishapur. But the dynasty also belonged from the paternal line to the Kara Koyunlu through Qara Yusuf. They were renowned for their secularism and broad outlook.

All rulers used the title of 'Nawab'.

Title	Reign Start	Reign End	Name
Subadar Nawab	26 January 1722	19 March 1739	Borhan al-Molk Mir Mohammad Amin Musawi Saʾadat ʾAli Khan I
Subadar Nawab	19 March 1739	28 April 1748	Abu'l Mansur Mohammad Moqim Khan
Nawab Wazir al-Mamalik	28 April 1748	13 May 1753	Abu'l Mansur Mohammad Moqim Khan
Subadar Nawab	5 November 1753	5 October 1754	Abu'l Mansur Mohammad Moqim Khan
Subadar Nawab	5 October 1754	15 February 1762	Jalal ad-Din Shojaʾ ad-Dowla Haydar
Nawab Wazir al-Mamalik	15 February 1762	26 January 1775	Jalal ad-Din Shojaʾ ad-Dowla Haydar
Nawab Wazir al-Mamalik	26 January 1775	21 September 1797	Asaf ad-Dowla Amani
Nawab Wazir al-Mamalik	21 September 1797	21 January 1798	Mirza Wazir ʾAli Khan
Nawab Wazir al-Mamalik	21 Jan 1798	11 Jul 1814	Yamin ad-Dowla Nazem al-Molk Saʾadat ʾAli Khan II Bahadur
Nawab Wazir al-Mamalik	11 July 1814	19 October 1818	Ghazi ad-Din Rafaʾat ad-Dowla Abul-Mozaffar Haydar Khan
King (Padshah-e Awadh, Shah-e Zaman)	19 October 1818	19 October 1827	Ghazi ad-Din Rafaʾat ad-Dowla Abul-Mozaffar Haydar Khan
King (Padshah-e Awadh, Shah-e Zaman)	19 October 1827	7 July 1837	Naser ad-Din Haydar Solayman Jah Shah
King (Padshah-e Awadh, Shah-e Zaman)	7 July 1837	17 May 1842	Moʾin ad-Din Abu'l-Fath Mohammad ʾAli Shah
King (Padshah-e Awadh, Shah-e Zaman)	17 May 1842	13 February 1847	Naser ad-Dowla Amjad ʾAli Thorayya Jah Shah
King (Padshah-e Awadh, Shah-e Zaman)	13 February 1847	7 February 1856	Naser ad-Din ʾAbd al-Mansur Mohammad Wajed ʾAli Shah
King (Padshah-e Awadh, Shah-e Zaman)	5 July 1857	3 March 1858	Berjis Qadr (in rebellion)

=== Residents ===
Name	Start	End
Nathaniel Middleton	1773	1774
John Bristow	1774	1776
Nathaniel Middleton	1776	1779 (second time)
C. Purling	1779	1780
John Bristow	1780	1781 (second time)
Nathaniel Middleton	1781	1782 (third time)
John Bristow	1782	1783 (third time)
William Palmer	1783	1784
Gabriel Harper	1784	1785
Edward Otto Ives	1785	1794
George Frederick Cherry	1794	1796
James Lumsden	1796	1799
William Scott	1799	1804
John Ulrich Collins	1804	1807
John Baillie	1807	1815
Richard Charles Strachey	1815	1817
John.R. Monckton	1818	1820
Felix Vincent Raper	1820	1823
Mordaunt Ricketts	1823	1827
Thomas Herbert Maddock	1829	1831
John Low	1831	1842
James Caulfield (interí)	1839	1841
William Nott	1841	1843
George Pollock	1843	1844
J. D. Shakespear	1844	1845
T. Reid Davidson	1845	1847
Archibald Richmond	1847	1849
Sir William Henry Sleeman	1849	1854
Sir James Outram	1854	1856

== Demographics ==
In the early eighteenth century, the population of Oudh was estimated to be 3 million. Oudh underwent a demographic shift in which Lucknow and Varanasi expanded to become metropolises of over 200,000 people over the course of the 18th century at the expense of Agra and Delhi. During this period the land on the banks of the Yamuna suffered frequent dry spells, while the Baiswara did not.

Although it was ruled by Muslims, a majority, roughly four fifths, of Oudh's population were Hindus.

== Culture ==
The Nawabs of Oudh were descended from a Sayyid line from Nishapur in Persia. They were Shia Muslims, and promoted Shia as the state religion. Ghazi-ud-Din Haidar Shah instituted the Oudh Bequest, a system of fixed payments by the British paid to the Shia holy cities of Najaf and Karbala. These payments, along with lifelong stipends to the wives and mother of Ghazi-ud-Din served as interest on the Third Oudh Loan taken in 1825.

The cities of Allahabad, Varanasi, and Ayodhya were important pilgrimage sites for followers of Hinduism and other Dharmic religions. The town of Bahraich was also revered by some Muslims.

== See also ==
- Awadh region
- Wajid Ali Shah
- Begum Hazrat Mahal
- List of Indian monarchs
- Oudh and Rohilkhand Railway
- Oudh and Tirhut Railway
- Oudh Bequest
