= Sagar Iron Suspension Bridge =

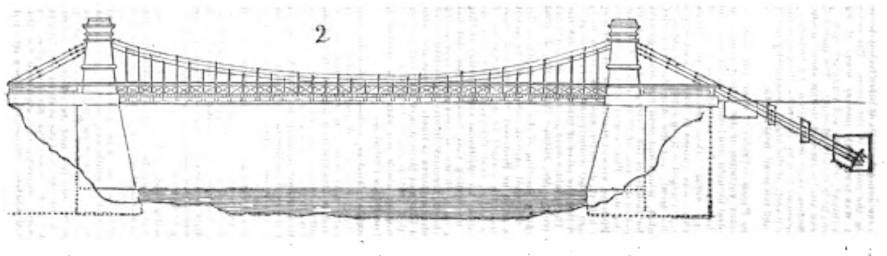
- Architectural drawing, 1836
- Crossed: Bewas River
- Locale: Sanodha, Madhya Pradesh, India

Characteristics
- Design: Suspension bridge
- Material: Wrought iron
- Longest span: 200 feet (61 m)

History
- Opened: 1830
- Destroyed: 1944

The Sagar Iron Suspension Bridge was the first suspension bridge in India and one of its earliest iron bridges, completed in 1830. The small bridge crossed the Bewas River (Note: Historically referred to as the Beose River or Bias River.) near Sanodha village, 18 kilometres (11 mi) from Sagar, Madhya Pradesh. Designed by Major Duncan Presgrave, (Note: Referred to as "Major Duncan Presgrave" in the 1836 Mechanics' Magazine article, and as "Colonel Presgrave" in the 1915 Sleeman memoir. Spelled "Pesgrave" in some later works.) the assay master of the mint at Sagar, the bridge was built entirely by native workmen and artisans using iron extracted, smelt, and wrought locally. The total cost of the project was considerably less than comparable bridges in Calcutta, which at the time used materials imported from England.

The iron ore was extracted locally and smelted exclusively in Tendukheda, then part of Sagar district. Using native techniques, the iron was made into small, irregular lumps that were hand-wrought into bars meeting specified dimensions. The laying of the foundation stone took place in December 1827. British colonial administrator William H. Sleeman, who was present, later wrote that "the work was undertaken more with a view to show what could be done out of their own resources, under minds capable of developing them, than to supply any pressing or urgent want". More recent scholarship suggests that the route from Jabbulpore to Sagar was vital in transporting goods and people from the Hyderabad region north to Sagar, and that the iron suspension bridge was needed to ford the "stream that became impassable in the monsoons".

The foundation was laid in April 1828. The abutments were built on solid rock, 42 feet (13 m) high to the roadway. The main span was 200 feet (61 m) between suspension points. The roadway was 12 feet (3.7 m) wide. There were 12 suspending chains, arranged in pairs on either side. The chains were made of round bar iron that was 1.25 inches (3.2 cm) in diameter. The platform including the suspension chains weighed an estimated 53 tons.

The roadway was opened to the public in June 1830. Sleeman wrote that on several occasions he had seen the bridge supporting the weight of a regiment of infantry, or a corps of cavalry, as they crossed the river, "and often several elephants at once". According to Sleeman, the bridge was "declared by a very competent judge to be equal to any structure of the same kind in Europe".

Destroyed by a flood in 1944, today its remains can be seen near the Sanodha Fort.

== See also ==
- List of bridges in India
- Iron Bridge, Lucknow
- Ram Jhula
