= Saadat Ali Khan =

Nawab of Oudh from 1798 to 1814

- Nawab of Oudh; Wazir-ul Mumalik; Yameen-ud Daulah; Nazim-ul Mumlikat; Khan Bahadur; Mubariz Jung (Note: title after death); Ja'nnat Aramgah (Note: title after death)
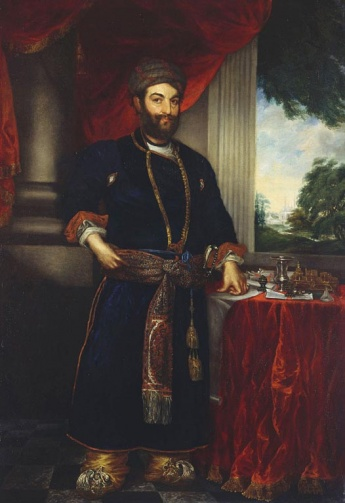
- Nawab Saadat Ali Khan

6th Nawab of Awadh
- Reign: 21 January 1798 – 11 July 1814
- Predecessor: Mirza Wazir `Ali Khan
- Successor: Ghazi ad-Din Rafa`at ad-Dowla Abu´l-Mozaffar Haydar Khan
- Born: b. bf. 1752
- Died: 11 July 1814; Lucknow, Kingdom of Awadh
- Burial: Tombs of Qaiserbagh
- Consort: Khursheed Zadi
- Issue: Rafa'at-ud-Daulah; Shams-ud-Daulah; Naseer-ud-Daulah
Names
- Yamin-ud-daula-Nawab Saadat Ali Khan
- House: Nishapuri
- Dynasty: Qara Qoyunlu
- Father: Shuja-ud-daula
- Mother: Chattar Kunwar
- Religion: Shia Islam

Yameen-ud Daula Saadat Ali Khan Bahadur (bf. 1752 – c. 11 July 1814) was the sixth Nawab of Oudh from 21 January 1798 to 11 July 1814, and the son of Shuja-ud-Daula. He was of Persian origin.

== Life ==
He was the second son of Nawab Shuja-ud-daula. Saadat Ali Khan succeeded his half-nephew, Mirza Wazir `Ali Khan, to the throne of Oudh in 1798. Saadat Ali Khan was crowned on 21 January 1798 at Bibiyapur Palace in Lucknow, by Sir John Shore.

In 1801, the British concluded a treaty with him, by which half of his dominions were ceded to the East India Company, in return for perpetual British protection of Oudh, from all internal and external disturbances and threats (the British were to later renege on this promise). The districts ceded (then yielding a total revenue of 1 Crore & 35 Lakhs of Rupees) are as under:

- Etawa
- Kora
- Kurra
- Rehur
- Farruckabad
- Khyreegurh
- Mounal
- Kunchunpore
- Azimgarh
- Benjun
- Goruckpore
- Botwul
- Allahabad
- Bareilly
- Moradabad
- Bijnore
- Budown
- hilibheet
- Shahjehanpore
- Nawabganj, Barabanki
- Rehlee
- Mohowl (less Jaulluk Arwu)

Following the cessation, he reduced the Oudh Army from 80,000 to 30,000 men.

He had three sons, Ghazi ad-Din Haydar, Shams-ud-daula, and Nasser-ud-daula. His son Ghazi ad-Din succeeded him, and later his grandson, Nasser ad-Din Haydar. After that, his son Nasser-ud-daula succeeded the throne, whilst his grandson, Iqbal-ud-daula, son of Shams-ud-daula, made claims to the throne in 1838. Saadat Ali Khan preferred his son Shams-ud-daula and desired to proclaim his heir, but was prevented by British interference.

Most of the buildings between the Kaiserbagh and Dilkusha were constructed by him. He had a palace called Dilkusha Kothi designed and built by Sir Gore Ouseley in 1805.

== Death ==
Nawab Saadat Ali Khan died in 1814 and he was buried with his wife Khursheed Zadi at Qaisar Bagh.

== Gallery ==
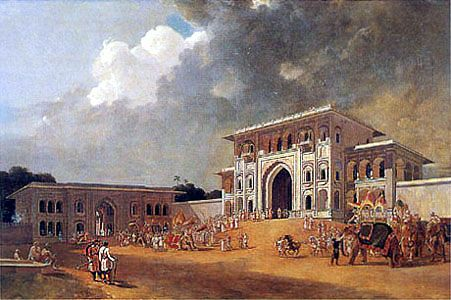
Gates of the Palace at Lucknow by W. Daniell, 1801

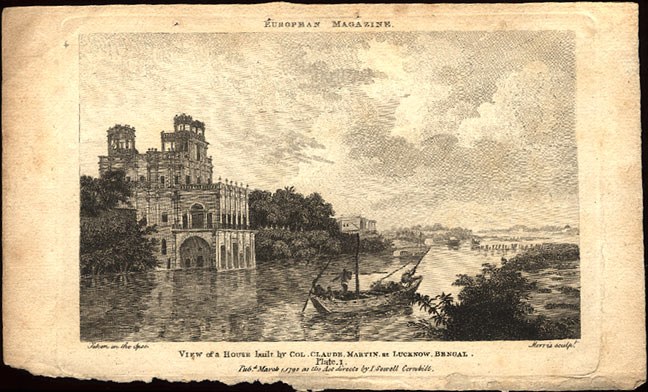
Claude Martin's home that was bought by Saadat Ali Khan for 50K rupees

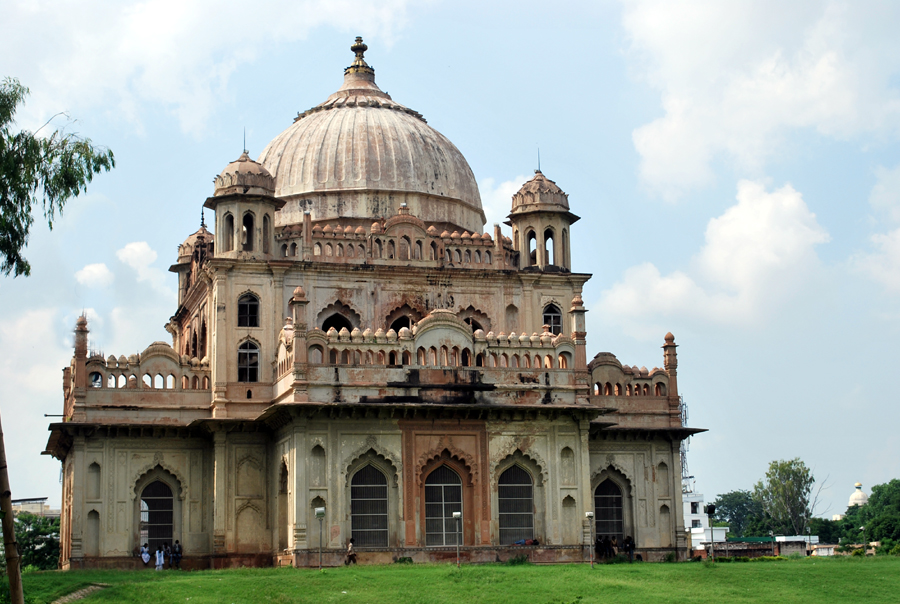
Tomb of Nawab Saadat Ali Khan II, at Qaiser Bagh, Lucknow

== See also ==
- Mirza Abu Taleb Khan

== Notes ==
Preceded by Mirza Wazir `Ali Khan	Nawab Wazir al-Mamalik of Oudh; 1798 – 1814	Succeeded by Ghazi ad-Din Rafa`at ad-Dowla Abu´l-Mozaffar Haydar Khan
