= Nasir-ud-Din Haidar Shah =

Nasir-ud-din Haidar Shahi
- Padshah-e-Awadh; Shah-e-Zaman
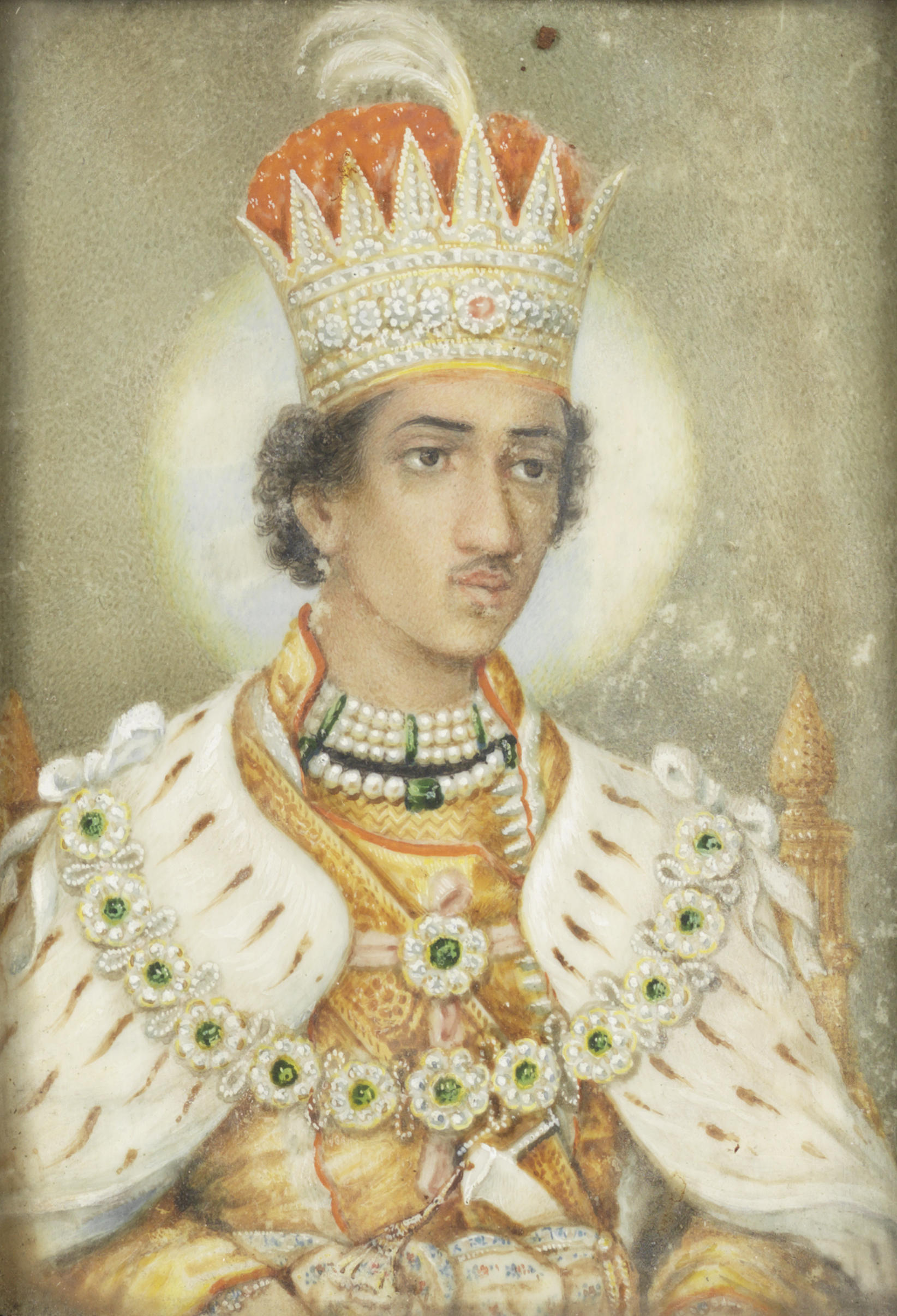

2nd King of Oudh
- Reign: 19 October 1827 – 7 July 1837
- Coronation: 20 October 1827, Lucknow
- Predecessor: Ghaziuddin Haider
- Successor: Muhammad Ali Shah
- Born: 9 September 1803
- Died: 7 July 1837 (aged 33); Lucknow, Oudh State
- Spouse: Malika Zamani (d. 22 December 1843); Muqadarra Auliya; Taj Mahal; Qudsiya Begum (d. 21 August 1834); Afzal Mahal
- Issue: Munna Jan
Names
- Abul Mansur Qutubuddin Sulaiman Jah Shah Jahan 'NASIR-UD-DIN HAIDAR
- House: Nishapuri
- Dynasty: Qara Qoyunlu
- Father: Ghazi-ud-Din Haidar Shah
- Religion: Shia Islam

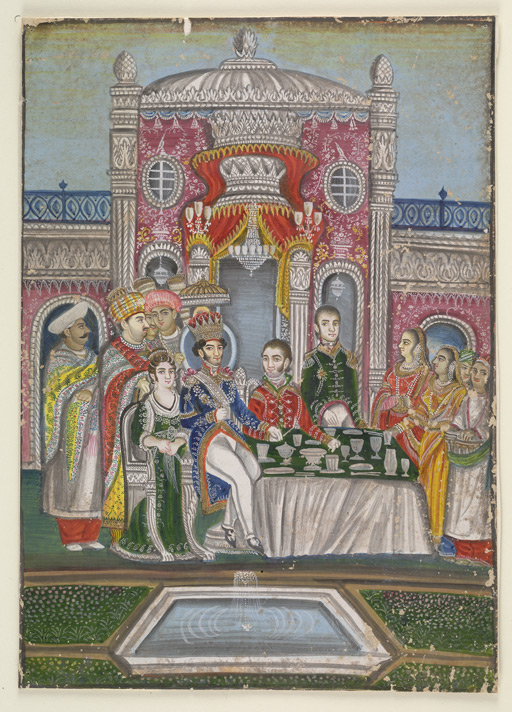
Nasir al-Din Haidar Shah is seen seated at a table with a British officer on his left and an English lady on his right

Nasir-ud-Din Haidar Shah (9 September 1803 – 7 July 1837) was the second King of Oudh from 19 October 1827 to 7 July 1837.

== Life ==
He was the son of Ghazi-ud-Din Haidar Shah. After the death of Ghazi-ud-din Haidar his son Nasir-ud-din Haidar ascended the throne on 20 October 1827 at the age of 25 years. He was fond of women and wine and had believed in astrology and astronomy. he also constructed Taaron Wali kothi under the supervision of Colonel Wilcox. He made additions of Darshan Vilas to Claude Martin's house – Farhat Buksh in 1832.

== Death ==
He was poisoned by members of the court in Kothi Farhat Baksh on the midnight eve of 7 july 1837. As he had no offspring, there was a succession crisis. The queen mother, Padshah Begum, put Munna Jan on the throne, but he was not acknowledged as a member of the royal family. The British intervened, jailing both Padshah Begum and Munna Jan. They enthroned Nasir-ud-daula, son of the late Nawab Saadat Ali Khan.

Resting place of the Nawab Nasiruddin Haider Shah next to the busy Daliganj Railway Station.

He was given his resting place in Iradat nagar, his tomb now sits in the backyards of Shia PG College and next to Daliganj railway junction.

| Preceded by Ghazi ad-Din Rafa`at ad-Dowla Abu´l-Mozaffar Haydar Khan | Padshah-e Oudh, Shah-e Zaman; 19 Oct 1827 – 7 Jul 1837 | Succeeded by Mo`in ad-Din Abu´l-Fath Mohammad 'Ali Shah |
