= Muhammad Ali Shah =

Nawab of Awadh from 1837 to 1842

- Nawab
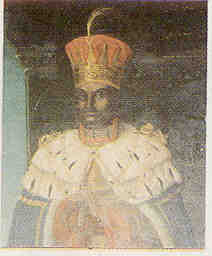

Nawab of Awadh
- Reign: 7 July 1837 – 7 May 1842
- Coronation: 8 July 1837, Farhat Bakhsh Palace, Lucknow
- Predecessor: Nasir-ud-Din Haidar Shah
- Successor: Amjad Ali Shah
- Born: 1774; Lucknow
- Died: 7 May 1842 (aged 67–68); Farhat Bakhsh Palace, Lucknow
- Burial: Husainabad (Chhota) Imambara, Lucknow
- Spouse: Malika Afaq; Malika Jahan
- Issue: Asghar Ali Shah; Amjad Ali Shah; Wajid Ali Shah; Mirza Jawad Khan
Names
- Abul Fateh Moinuddin Muhammad Ali Shah
- House: Nishapuri
- Dynasty: Qara Qoyunlu
- Father: Saadat Ali Khan II
- Religion: Shia Islam

Nasser-ud-daula Mu'in ad-Din Muhammad Ali Shah (1774 – 7 May 1842), was the ninth Nawab or King of Oudh from 7 July 1837 until his death on 7 May 1842.

== Biography ==
Muhammad Ali Shah was son of Saadat Ali Khan, brother of Ghazi-ud-Din Haidar Shah and uncle of Nasir-ud-Din Haidar Shah. He attained the throne with British help following the demise of his nephew, as opposed to the ex-queen mother's (Badshah Begum) attempts to nominate another successor, Munna Jan (the son child of Nasir-ud-Din Haider, whom his father had disavowed). Padshah Begum and Munna Jan were afterwards imprisoned by the British in the fort of Chunar.

Muhammad Ali Shah of Oudh built the Shrine of Hurr at Karbala.

== Death ==
He died on 7 May 1842 AD.

== Gallery ==
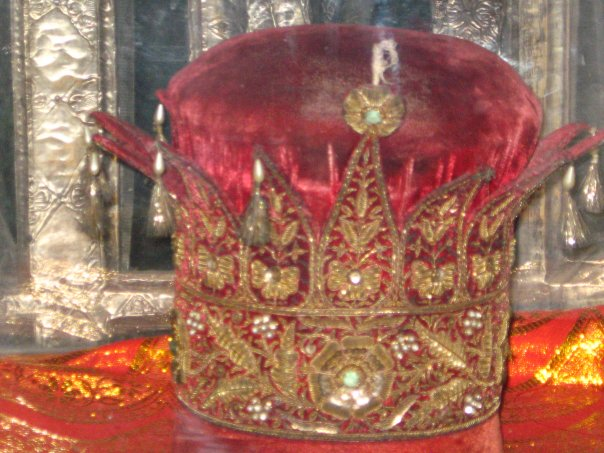
The crown of Muhammed Ali Shah Bahadur, kept in Chhota Imambara

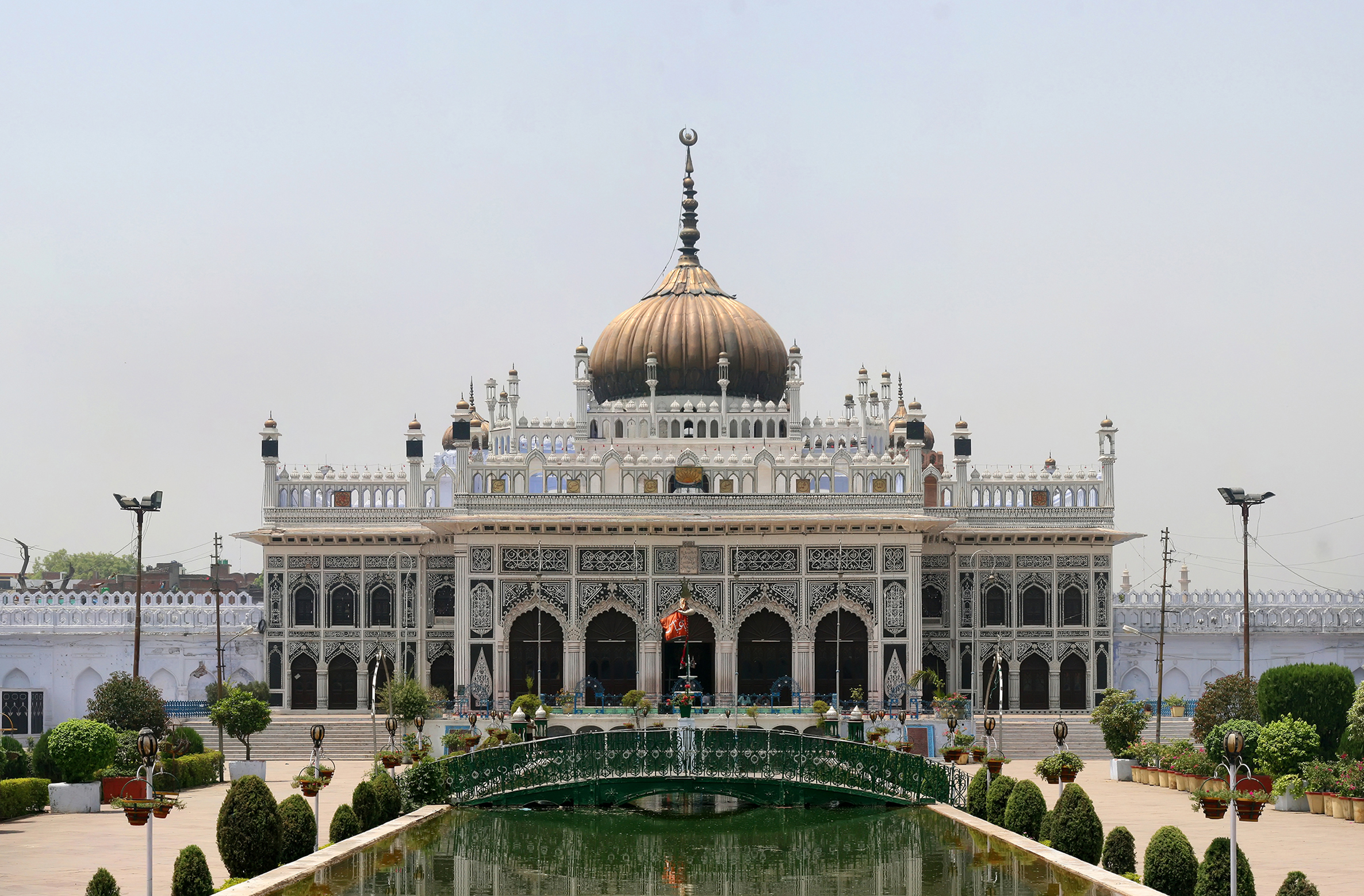
Chhota Imambara in Lucknow

== Notes ==
Preceded by Naser ad-Din Haydar Solayman Jah Shah	Padshah-e-Oudh, Shah-e Zaman; 7 Jul 1837 – 7 May 1842	Succeeded by Naser ad-Dowla Amjad 'Ali Thorayya Jah Shah
