= Mary Short =

Sultan Mariam Begum Sahiba
- Queen consort of Awadh
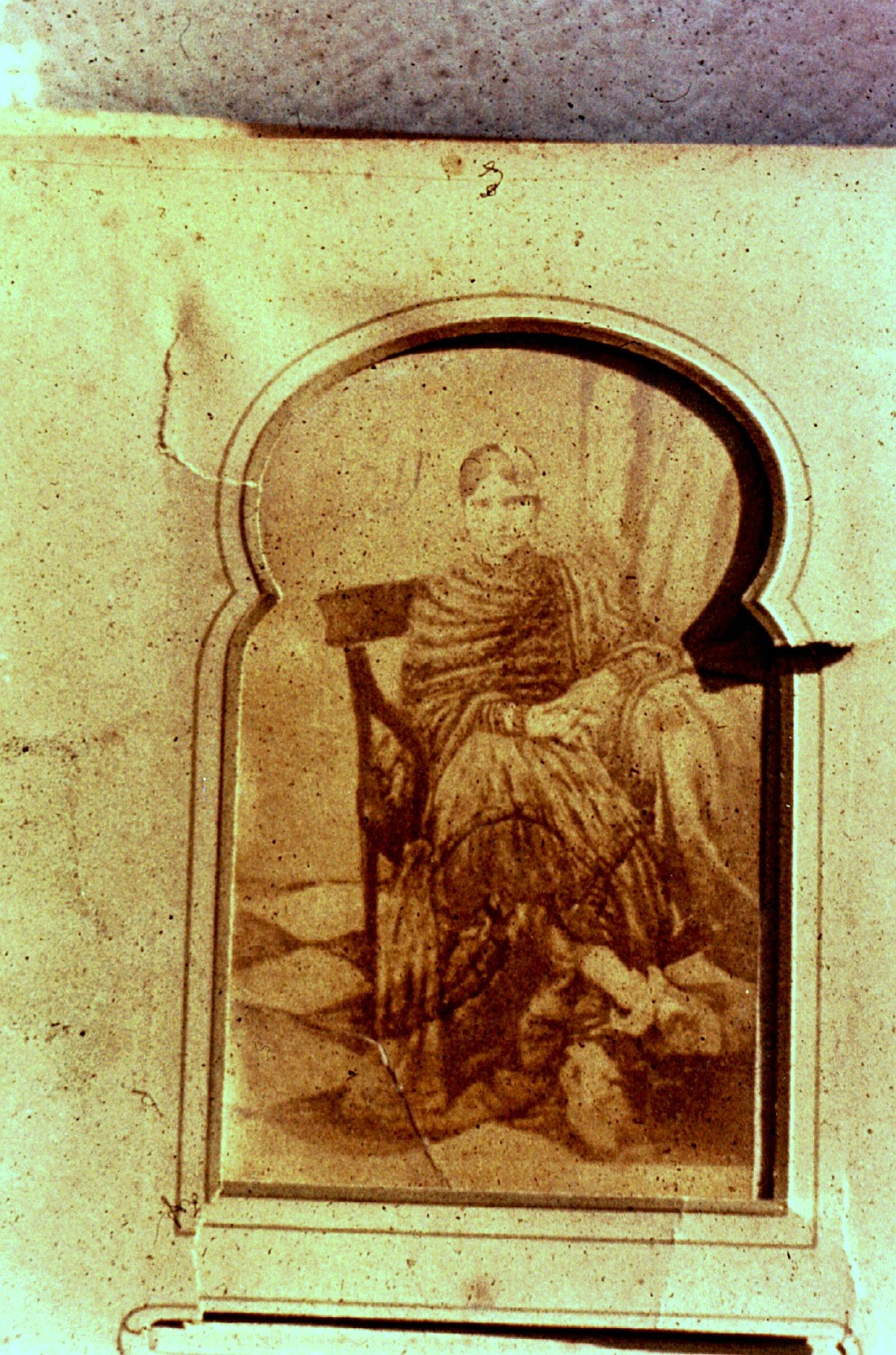
- Widely believed to depict Mary Angela Short (Sultan Mariam Begum), a queen consort of Awadh

Queen consort of Awadh
- Reign: about 1817 – 19 October 1827
- Born: Mary Angela Short about 1802
- Died: 6 April 1849; Lucknow, Awadh
- Spouse: Ghazi-ud-Din Haidar Shah
- House: Nishapuri (by marriage)
- Dynasty: Qara Qoyunlu (by marriage)
- Father: Dr James Short
- Mother: Mary Minas
- Religion: Shia Islam, Roman Catholicism

Mary Angela Short ('Sultan Mariam Begum Sahiba') (1802 – 5 April 1849) was a royal queen consort of Awadh, married to king Ghazi-ud-Din Haidar Shah of Awadh.

== Biography ==
Mary Short was born in India to the British medical doctor James Short and his Armenian wife Mary Carrapiet or Minas. Her father left for England in 1807 and abandoned his family. She was raised under difficult financial circumstances in Agra. She had three siblings, Joseph, John, and Eliza, the latter two of whom suffered from mental problems.

In 1817 or 1822, Mary Short eloped with king Haydar I Ghazi and married him. She converted to Islam and was given the name Nawab Sultan Mariam Begum Sahiba. She was the favorite wife of the king, who gave her the title Padshah Begum, a title translated by the British to "queen". She remained in the royal harem for five years, until the death of her husband in 1827. The king constructed a palace in European style for her, called Vilayati Bagh.

In 1827, her husband died and was succeeded by his son in another marriage. She left her royal wasika to her younger brother, Joseph Short. As a widow, Mary Short left the royal harem and converted to Roman Catholicism. She died of tuberculosis.

== Sources ==
- Speirs, Malcolm. The Wasikadars of Awadh: A History of Certain Nineteenth Century Families of Lucknow. India, Rupa & Company, 2008.
