= Ghazi-ud-Din Haidar Shah =

- Nawab Wazir al-Mamalik of Awadh; Padshah-e Awadh; Shah-e Zaman
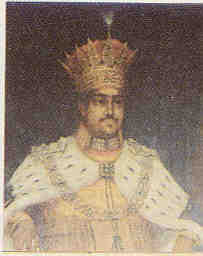

Nawab Wazir of Oudh
- Reign: 11 July 1814 – 19 October 1818
- Coronation: 12 July 1814, Lucknow
- Predecessor: Yamin ad-Dowla Nazem al-Molk Sa`adat 'Ali Khan II Bahadur
- Successor: Naser ad-Din Haydar Solayman Jah Shah

King of Oudh
- Reign: 19 October 1818 – 19 October 1827
- Predecessor: Yamin ad-Dowla Nazem al-Molk Sa`adat 'Ali Khan II Bahadur
- Successor: Naser ad-Din Haydar Solayman Jah Shah
- Born: circa 1769
- Died: 19 October 1827
- Spouse: Mary Short-Padshah Begum
Names
- Ghazi ad-Din Rafa`at ad-Dowla Abu´l-Mozaffar Haydar Khan
- House: Nishapuri
- Dynasty: Qara Qoyunlu
- Father: Saadat Ali Khan
- Religion: Shia Islam

Ghazi-ud-Din Haidar Shah (c. 1769 – 19 October 1827) was the last nawab wazir of Oudh from 11 July 1814 to 19 October 1818, and first King of Oudh (Oudh State) from 19 October 1818 to 19 October 1827.

== Life ==
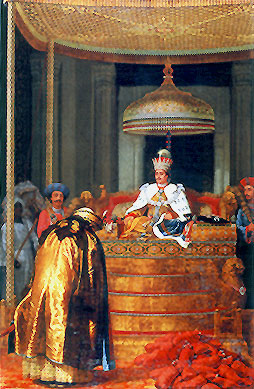
'Ghazi-ud-Din Haider, King of Awadh, receiving Tribute'

He was the third son of Nawab Saadat Ali Khan and Mushir Zadi was his mother. He became Nawab Wazir of Oudh on 11 July 1814 after the death of his father.

In 1816, as a consequence of the Nepal War (in which Ghazi-ud-Din loaned the British 1 Crore Rupees), the East India Company made some territorial readjustments in order to liquidate the loan. They ceded to him the districts of Nawabgunge & Khyreegunge (both taken from Oudh in 1801), along with the Terae lands taken from Nepal, and took Handea (or Kewae).

In 1818, under the influence of the Marquess of Hastings, the British Governor of the Presidency of Fort William (Bengal), he declared himself as the independent Padshah-i-Awadh (King of Oudh). Lord Hastings believed that if Ghazi-ud-din, were made king, he would be a useful counterpoise to the Emperor of Delhi. He accordingly induced him to coin money in his own name, and to assume the title of Shah (King). The title never took much root out of Lucknow, and though Ghazi-ud-din and his four successors were all titular kings, their rule is far more commonly spoken of by the country folk as the "Nawabi" than as "Shahi".

He died in the Farhat Bakhsh palace in Lucknow in 1827. He was succeeded by his son Nasir-ud-Din Haider after his death.

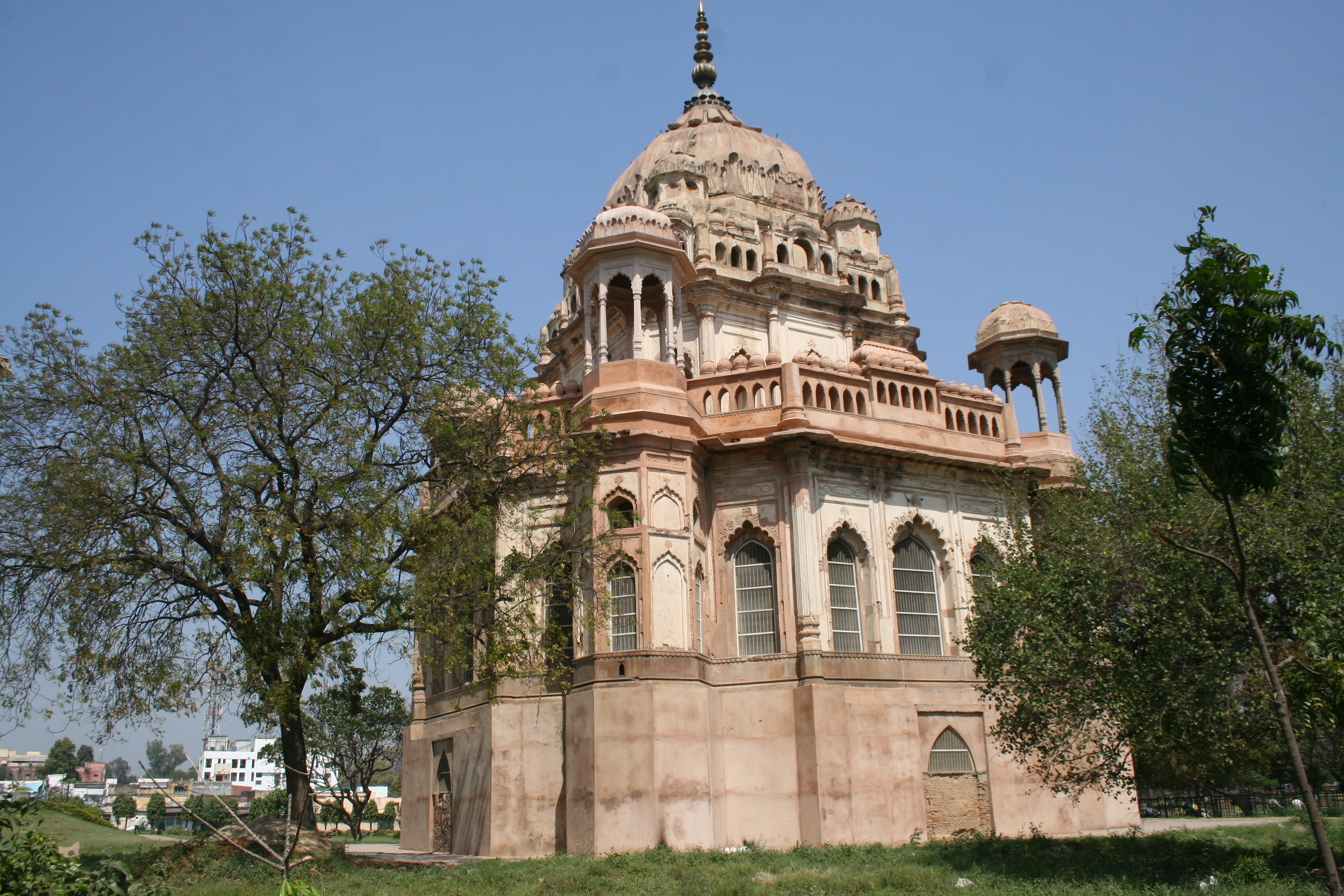
Tomb of Mushir Zadi.jpg

== Patron of art and culture ==
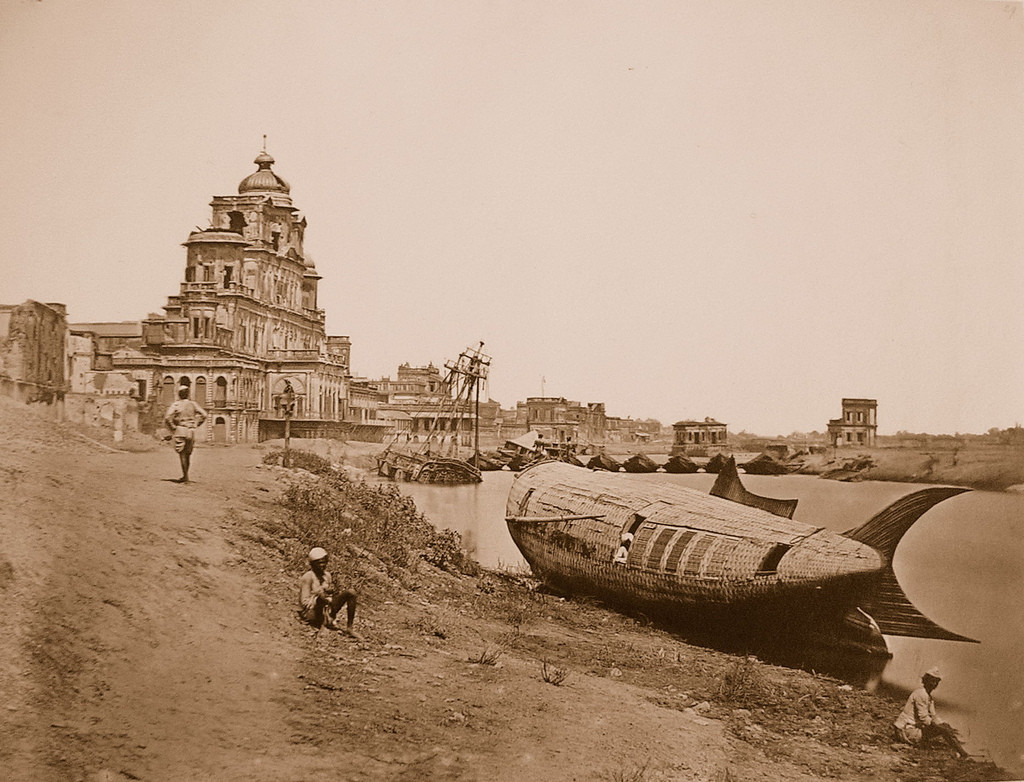
Chutter Manzil and the Royal Boat of Oude by Felice Beato

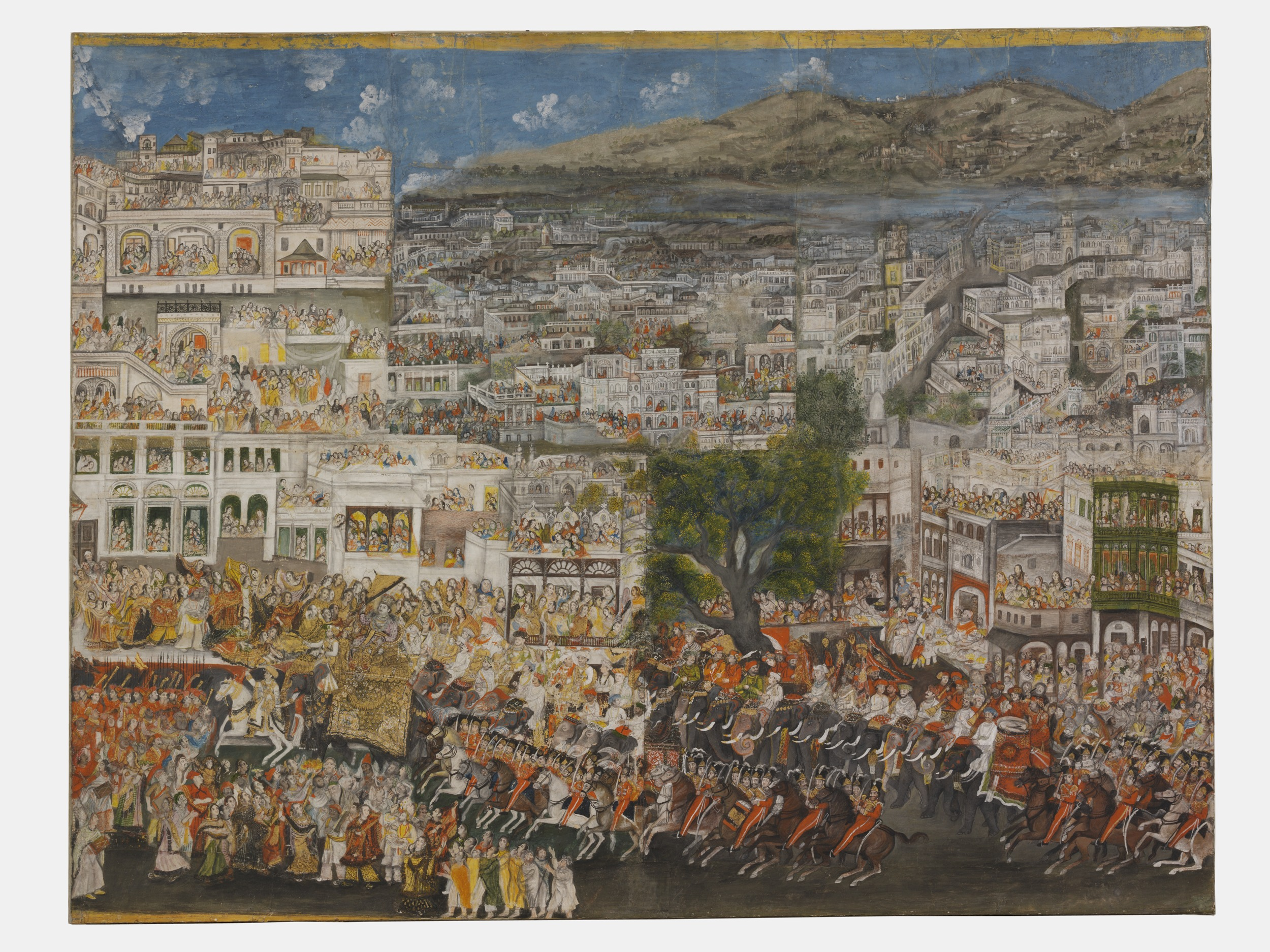
A Procession of Ghazi ud-Din Haider through Lucknow

Several monuments in Lucknow were constructed by Ghazi-ud-Din Haidar. He built the Chattar Manzil palace and added the Mubarak Manzil and the Shah Manzil in the Moti Mahal complex for better viewing of the animal fights. He also constructed the tombs of his parents, Sadat Ali Khan and Mushir Zadi Begum. For his European wife Mary Short, he constructed a European style building known as the Vilayati Bagh. Another creation, the Shah Najaf Imambara (1816), his mausoleum, on the bank of the Gomti is a copy of the fourth Caliph Ali's (R.A) burial place in Najaf, Iraq. His three wives, Sarfaraz Mahal, Mubarak Mahal and Mumtaz Mahal were also buried here.

Ghazi-ud-Din first appointed a British artist, Robert Home (1752–1834) as his court artist and after his retirement in 1828, he appointed another Briton, George Duncan Beechey (1798–1852) as his court artist. In 1815, Raja Ratan Singh (1782–1851), a noted astronomer, poet and scholar of Arabic, Persian, Turkish, Sanskrit and English joined his court. Because of his initiative, a royal litho printing press in Lucknow was set up in 1821 and the Haft Qulzum, a dictionary and grammar of the Persian language in two volumes was published from this press in the same year.

== Coins of Ghazi-ud-Din ==
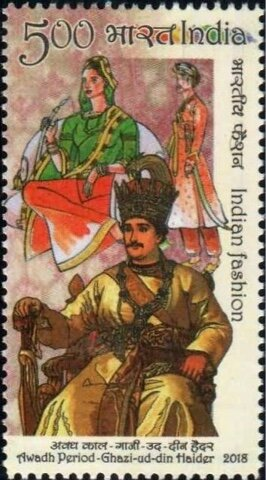
Commemorative postage stamp issued by India in 2018 portraying Ghazi-ud-Din Haider as part of the "Indian Fashion Through the Centuries" series.

After declaring himself as King, Ghazi-ud-Din Haidar Shah issued coins on his name instead of the Mughal emperor, Shah Alam II from AH 1234 (1818). His coins were completely different from his predecessors. The most important feature of his coinage was the introduction of his coat of arms on the reverse of coin, consisting of two fish facing each other, two tigers each holding a pennon for support and a Katar (a small dagger) surmounted by a crown symbolizing the king.

== Gallery ==
Flag of Nawabs of Awadh, introduced during the reign of Ghazi-ud-Din Haidar Shah (1814–1827).

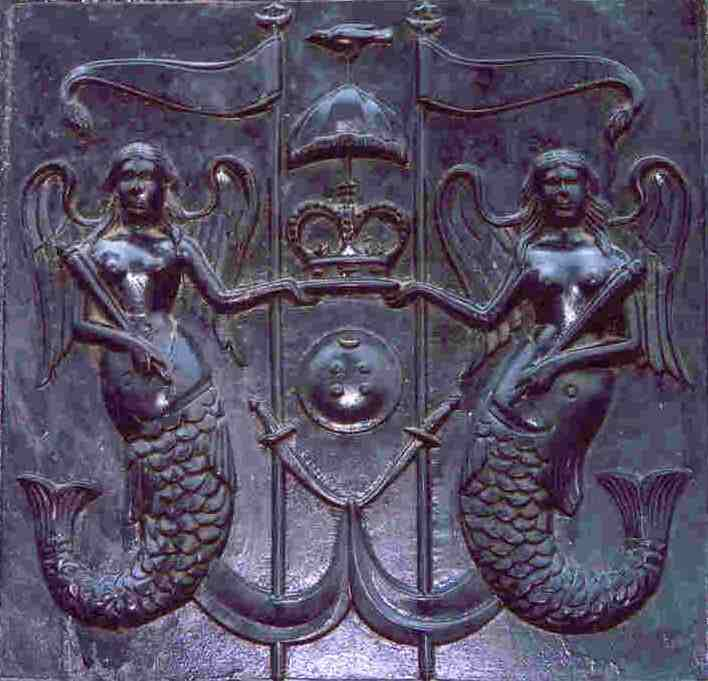
Other Seal, introduced during the reign of Ghazi-ud-Din Haidar (1814–1827).

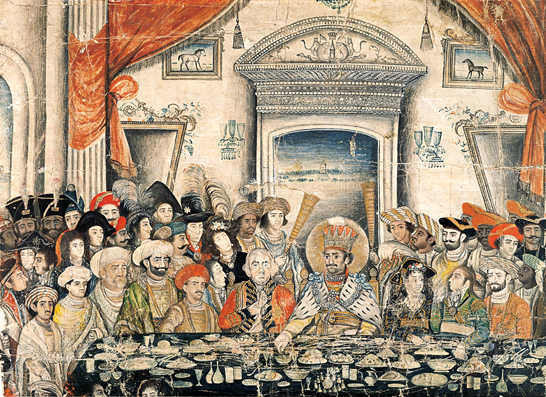
Ghazi ud-Din Haidar, seventh Nawab (1814–27), entertains Lord and Lady Moira to a banquet in his palace Opaque watercolour, 1820–22

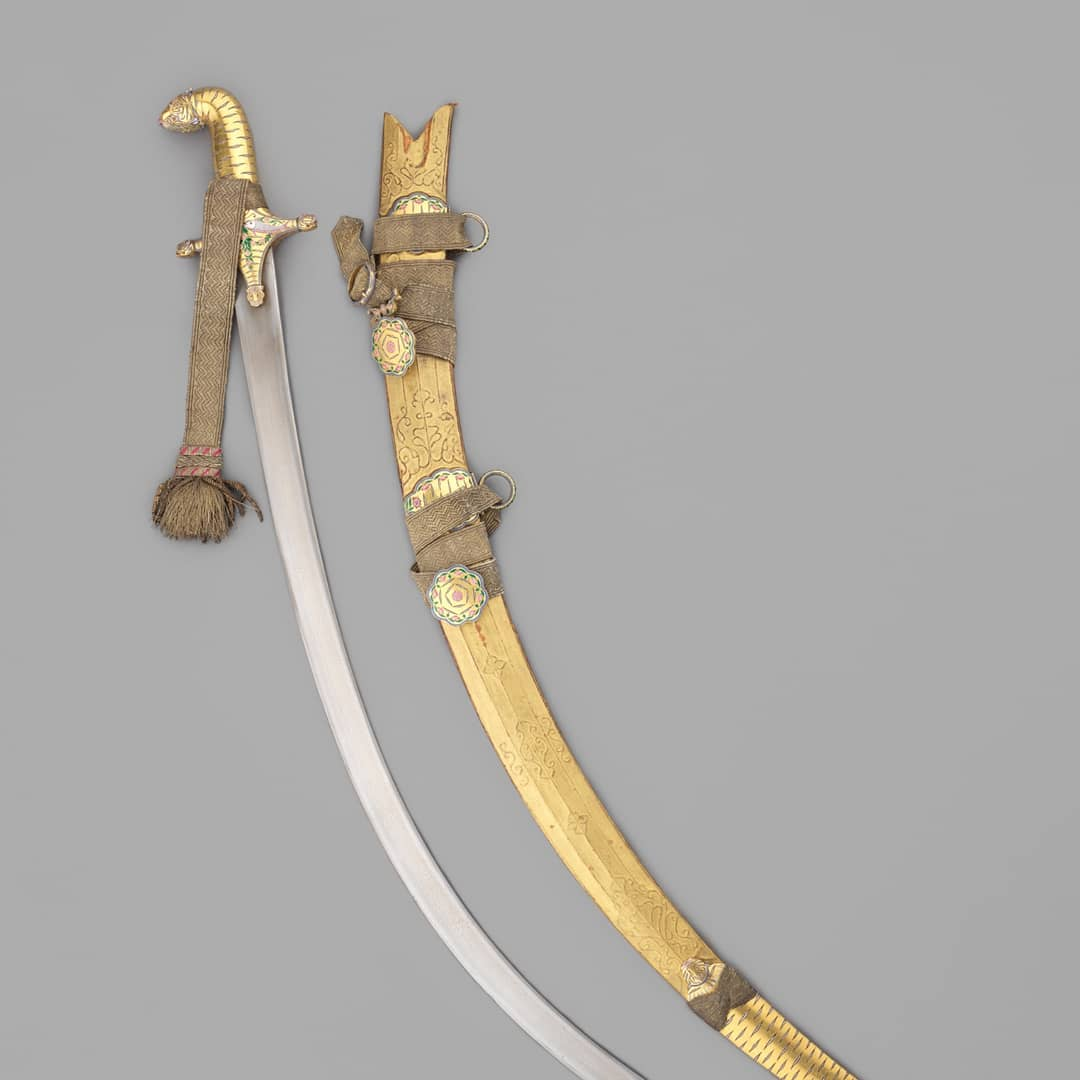
Scimitar and Scabbard of Nawab Ghazi-ud-Din Haidar Shah of Awadh.

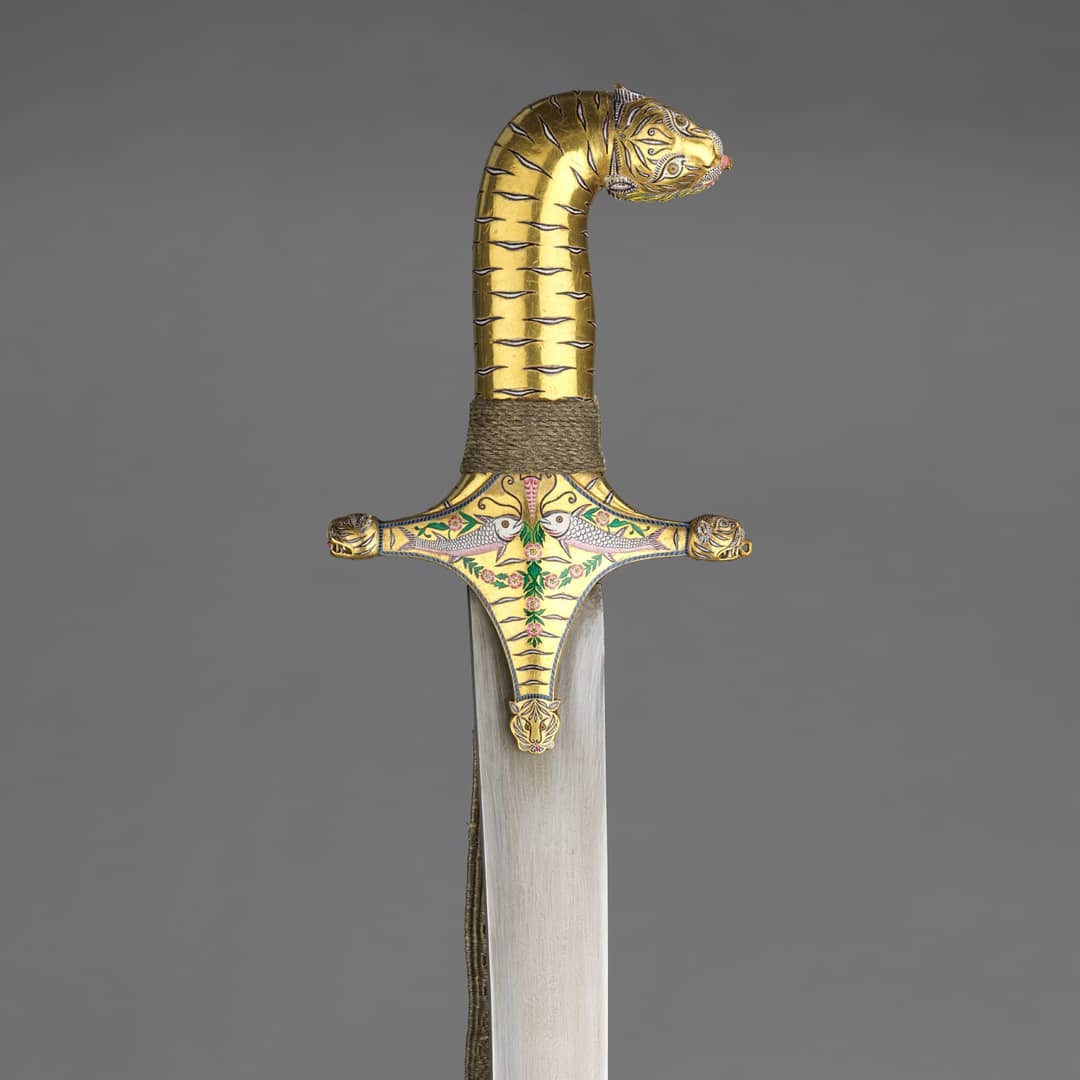
Hilt of Ghazi-ud-Din Haidar Shah's sword.

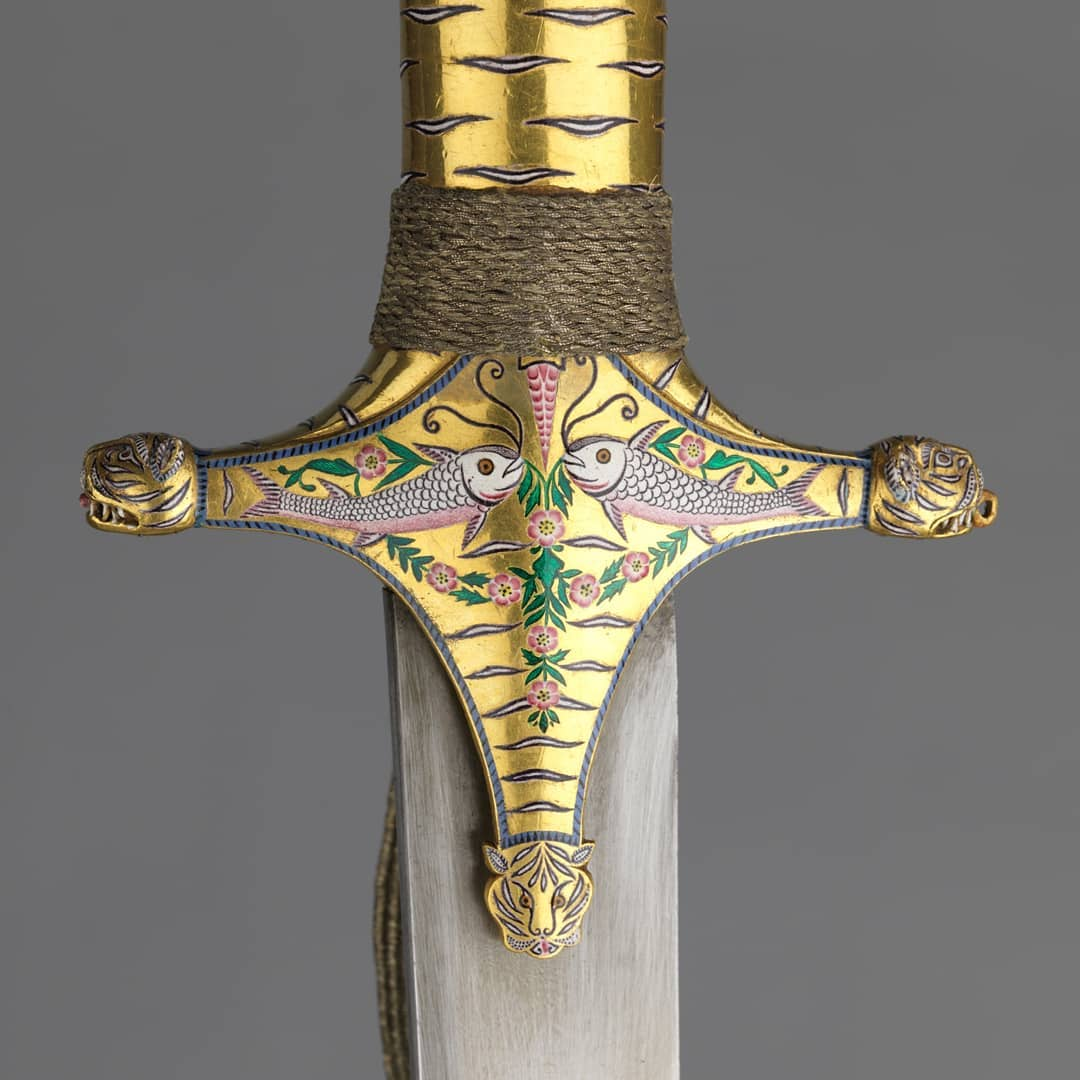
Fish motif on the cross-guard of Ghazi-ud-Din Haidar Shah's sword.

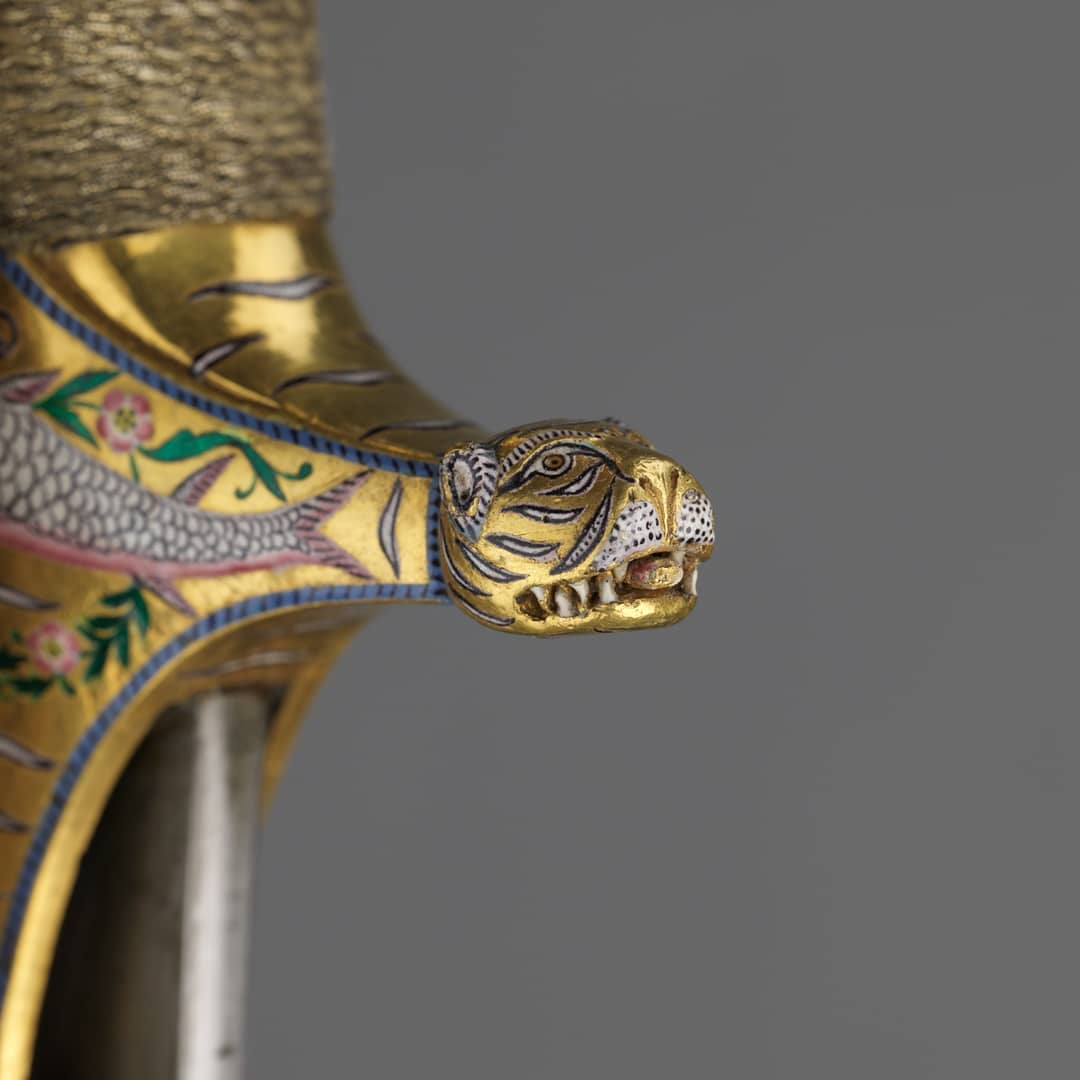
Tiger's head at the quillon of Ghazi-ud-Din Haidar Shah's sword.

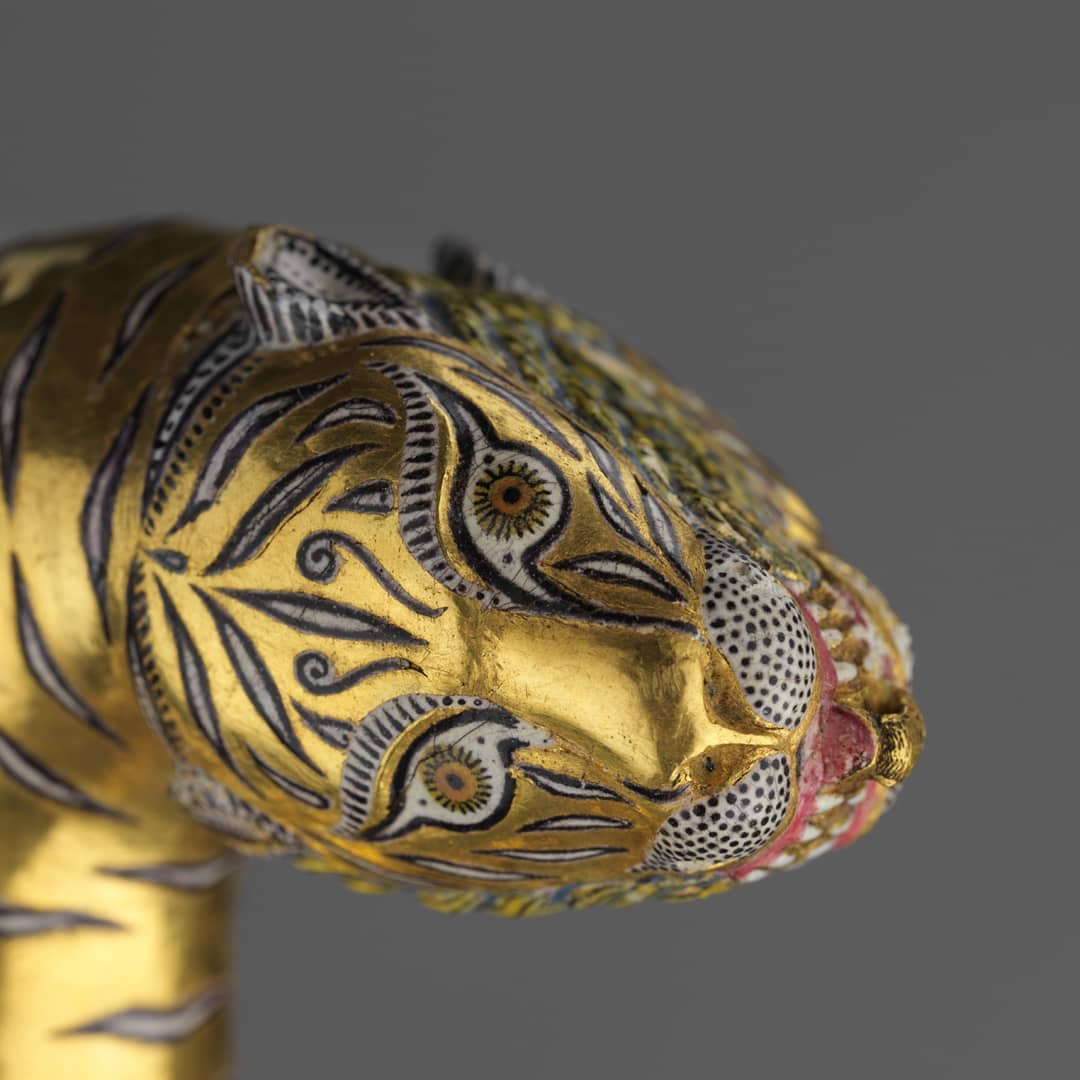
Tiger's head at the pommel of Ghazi-ud-Din Haidar Shah's sword.

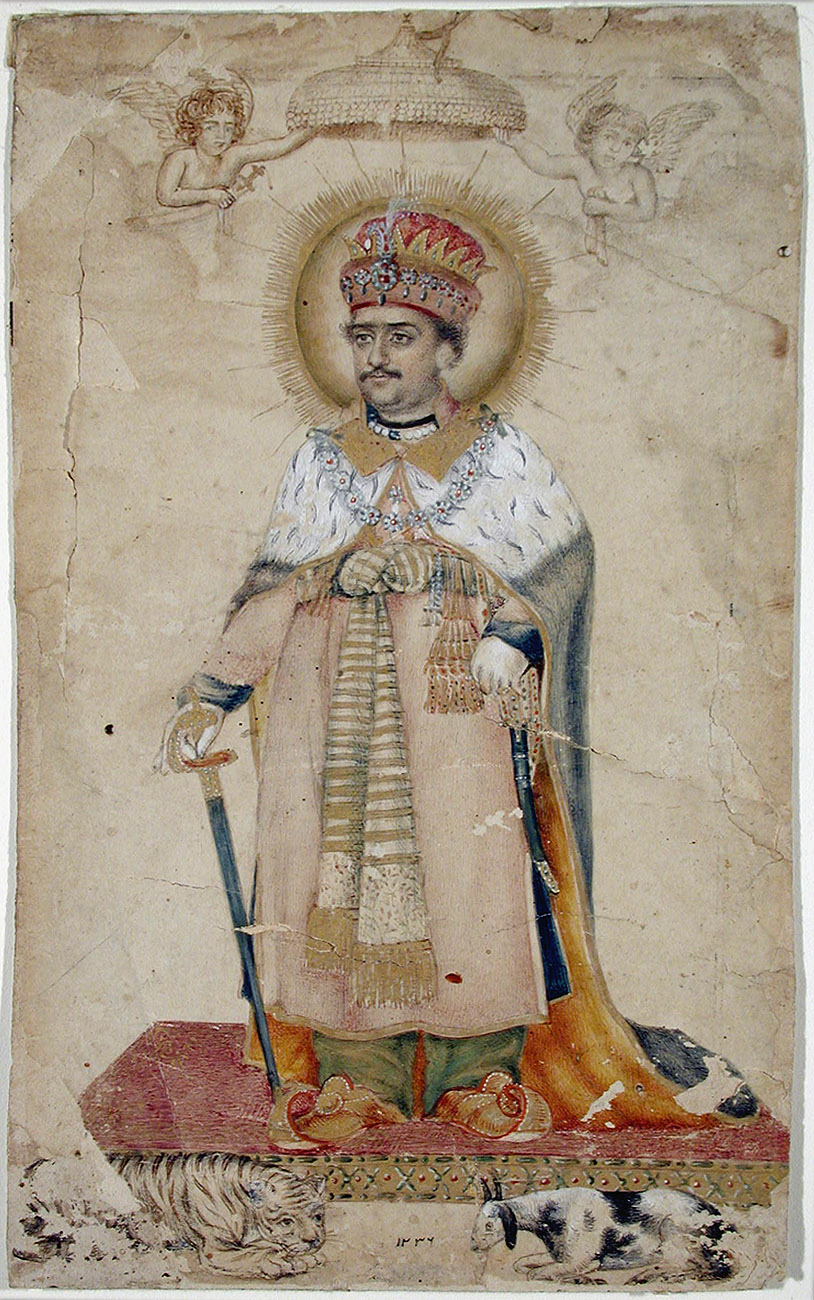
Ghazi ud-din Haidar Shah, King of Lucknow painting

Preceded by Yamin ad-Dowla Nazem al-Molk Sa`adat 'Ali Khan II Bahadur	Nawab Wazir al-Mamalik of Oudh; 11 Jul 1814 – 19 Oct 1818	Succeeded by abolished
Preceded by new creation	Padshah-e Oudh, Shah-e Zaman; 19 Oct 1818 – 19 Oct 1827	Succeeded by Naser ad-Din Haydar Solayman Jah Shah
