= Indo-Islamic architecture =

Islamic architecture in Indian subcontinent

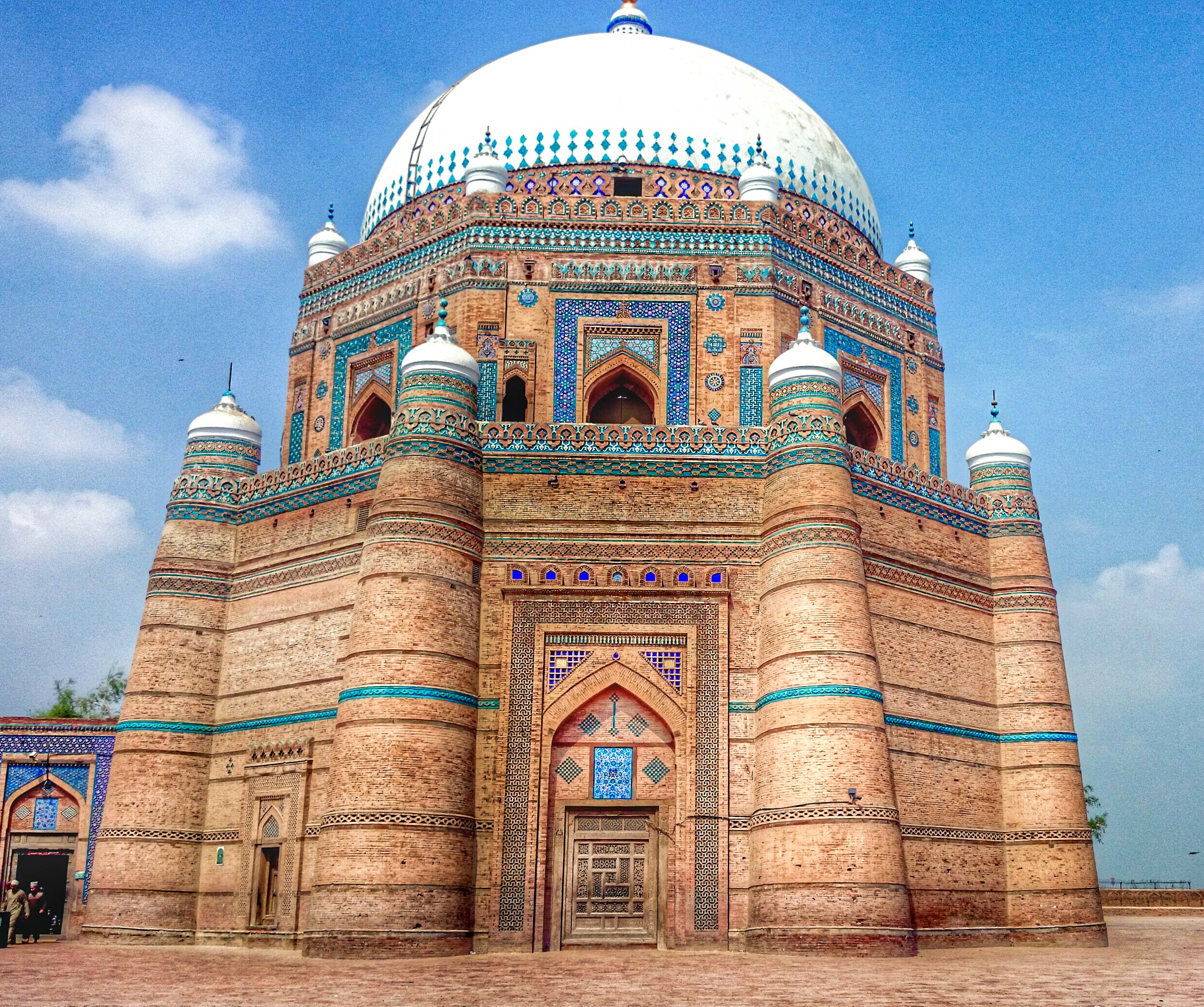
Tomb of Shah Rukn-e-Alam (built 1320 to 1324) in Multan, Pakistan

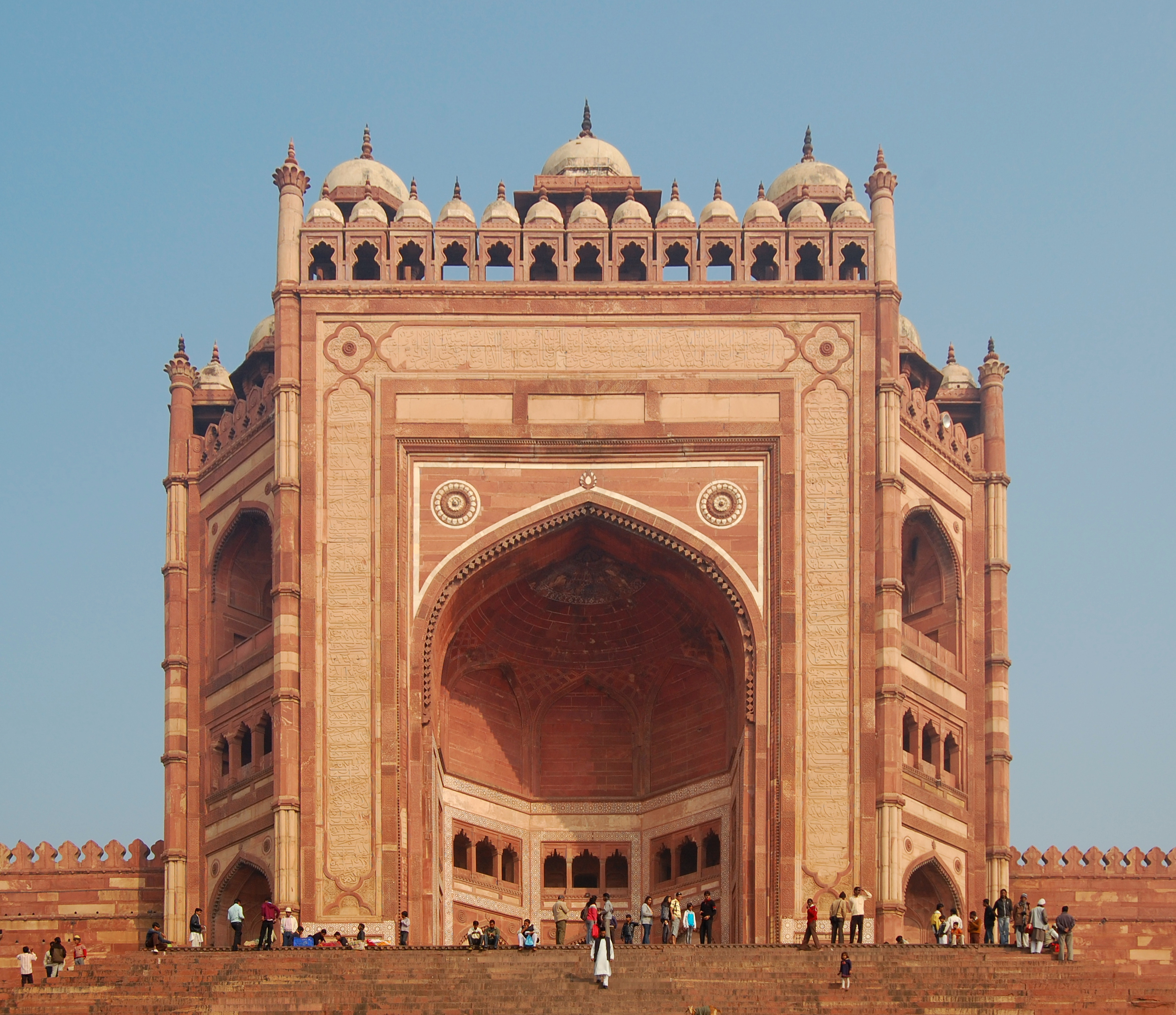
The Buland Darwaza gateway to Fatehpur Sikri, built by Akbar in 1601

Indo-Islamic architecture is the architecture of the Indian subcontinent produced by and for Islamic patrons and purposes. Despite an initial Arab presence in Sindh, the development of Indo-Islamic architecture began in earnest with the establishment of Delhi as the capital of the Ghurid dynasty in 1193. Succeeding the Ghurids was the Delhi Sultanate, a series of Central Asian dynasties that consolidated much of North, East, and Central India, and later the Mughal Empire during the early 16th century. Both of these dynasties introduced Islamic architecture and art styles from West Asia into the Indian subcontinent.

The types and forms of large buildings required by Muslim elites, with mosques and tombs much the most common, were very different from those previously built in India. The exteriors of both were very often topped by large domes, and made extensive use of arches. Both of these features were hardly used in Hindu temple architecture and other indigenous Indian styles. Both types of building essentially consist of a single large space under a high dome, and completely avoid the figurative sculpture so important to Hindu temple architecture.

Islamic buildings initially adapted the skills of a workforce trained in earlier Indian traditions to their own designs. Unlike most of the Islamic world, where brick tended to predominate, India had highly skilled builders well used to producing stone masonry of extremely high quality. Alongside the architecture developed in Delhi and prominent centres of Mughal culture such as Agra, Lahore and Allahabad, a variety of regional styles developed in regional kingdoms like the Bengal, Gujarat, Deccan, Jaunpur and Kashmir Sultanates. By the Mughal period, generally agreed to represent the peak of the style, aspects of Islamic style began to influence architecture made for Hindus, with even temples using scalloped arches, and later domes. This was especially the case in palace architecture. Following the collapse of the Mughal Empire, regional nawabs such as in Lucknow, Hyderabad and Mysore continued to commission and patronize the construction of Mughal-style architecture in the princely states.

Indo-Islamic architecture has left a large impact on modern Indian, Pakistani and Bangladeshi architecture, as in the case of its influence on the Indo-Saracenic Revivalism of the late British Raj. Both secular and religious buildings are influenced by Indo-Islamic architecture.

== Architecture of the Delhi Sultanate ==
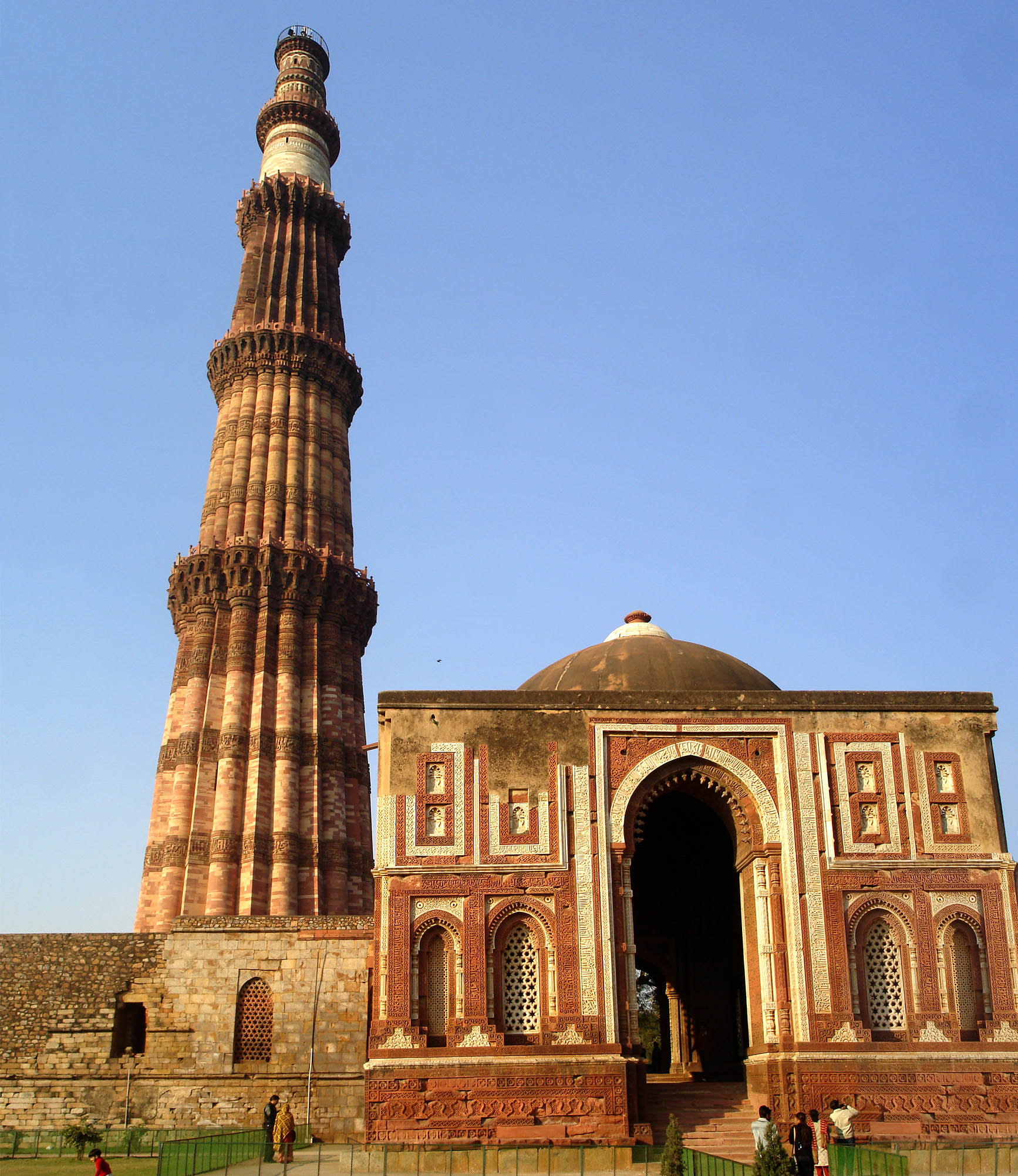
The Qutb Minar (left, begun c. 1200) next to the Alai Darwaza gatehouse (1311); Qutb Complex in Delhi

The best-preserved example of a mosque from the days of the infancy of Islam in South Asia is the ruined mosque at Banbhore in Sindh, Pakistan, from the year 727, from which only the plan can be deduced.

The start of the Delhi Sultanate in 1206 under Qutb ud-Din Aibak introduced a large Islamic state to India, using Central Asian styles. The important Qutb Complex in Delhi was begun under Muhammad of Ghor, by 1199, and continued under Qutb al-Din Aibak and later sultans. The Quwwat-ul-Islam Mosque, now a ruin, was the first structure. Like other early Islamic buildings it re-used elements such as columns from destroyed Hindu and Jain temples, including one on the same site whose platform was reused. The style was Iranian, but the arches were still corbelled in the traditional Indian way.

Beside it is the extremely tall Qutb Minar, a minaret or victory tower, whose original four stages reach 73 meters (with a final stage added later). Its closest comparator is the 62-metre all-brick Minaret of Jam in Afghanistan, of c.1190, a decade or so before the probable start of the Delhi tower. The surfaces of both are elaborately decorated with inscriptions and geometric patterns; in Delhi the shaft is fluted with "superb stalactite bracketing under the balconies" at the top of each stage. In general minarets were slow to be used in India, and are often detached from the main mosque where they exist.

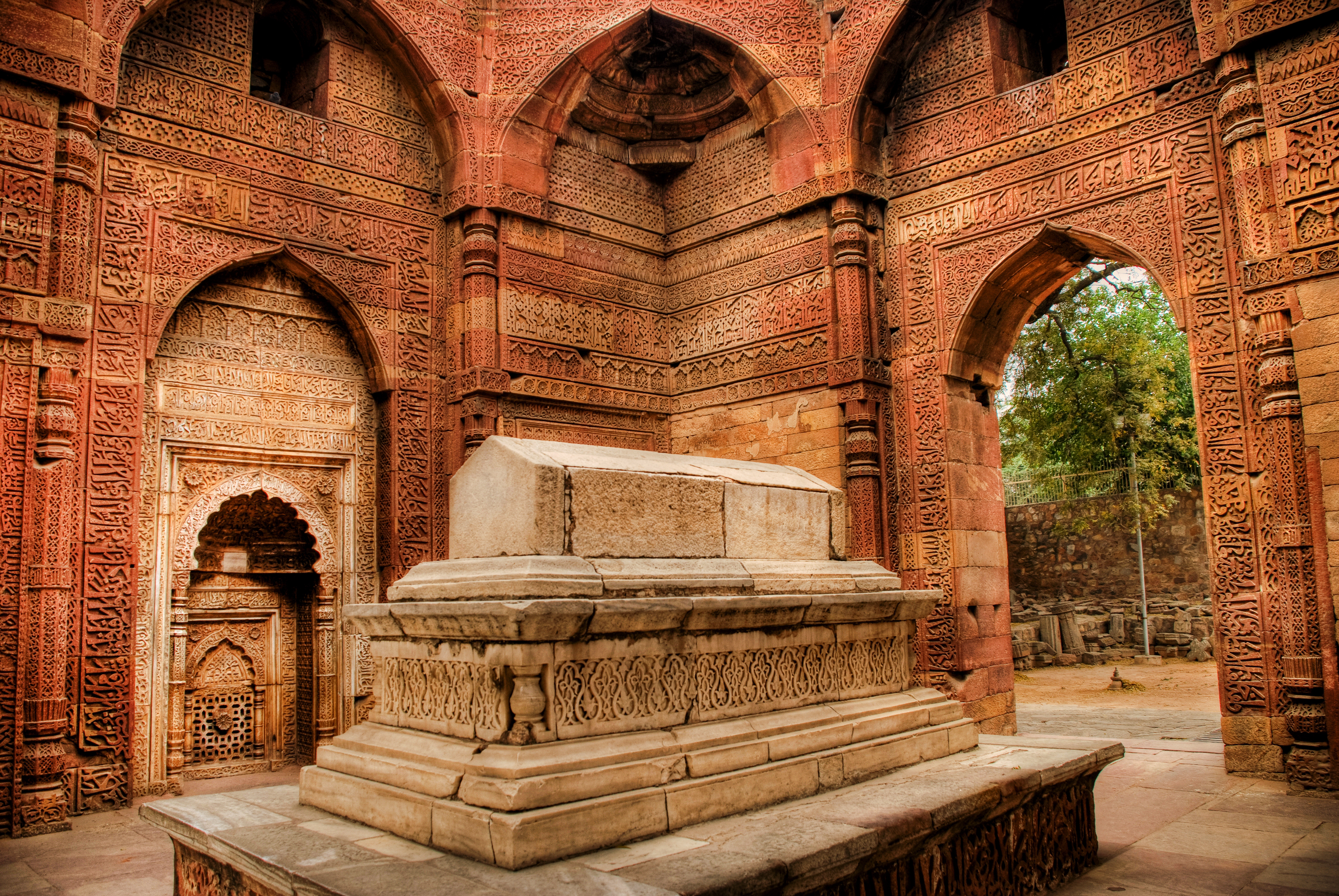
Mausoleum of Iltutmish, Delhi, by 1236, with corbel arches

The Tomb of Iltutmish was added by 1236; its dome, the squinches again corbelled, is now missing, and the intricate carving has been described as having an "angular harshness", from carvers working in an unfamiliar tradition. Other elements were added to the complex over the next two centuries.

Another very early mosque, begun in the 1190s, is the Adhai Din Ka Jhonpra in Ajmer, Rajasthan, built for the same Delhi rulers, again with corbelled arches and domes. Here Hindu temple columns (and possibly some new ones) are piled up in threes to achieve extra height. Both mosques had large detached screens with pointed corbelled arches added in front of them, probably under Iltutmish a couple of decades later. In these the central arch is taller, in imitation of an iwan. At Ajmer the smaller screen arches are tentatively cusped, for the first time in India.

By around 1300 true domes and arches with voussoirs were being built; the ruined Tomb of Balban (d. 1287) in Delhi may be the earliest survival. The Alai Darwaza gatehouse at the Qutb complex, from 1311, still shows a cautious approach to the new technology, with very thick walls and a shallow dome, only visible from a certain distance or height. Bold contrasting colours of masonry, with red sandstone and white marble, introduce what was to become a common feature of Indo-Islamic architecture, substituting for the polychrome tiles used in Persia and Central Asia. The pointed arches come together slightly at their base, giving a mild horseshoe arch effect, and their internal edges are not cusped but lined with conventionalized "spearhead" projections, possibly representing lotus buds. Jali, stone openwork screens, are introduced here; they already had been long used in temples.

=== Tughlaq architecture ===
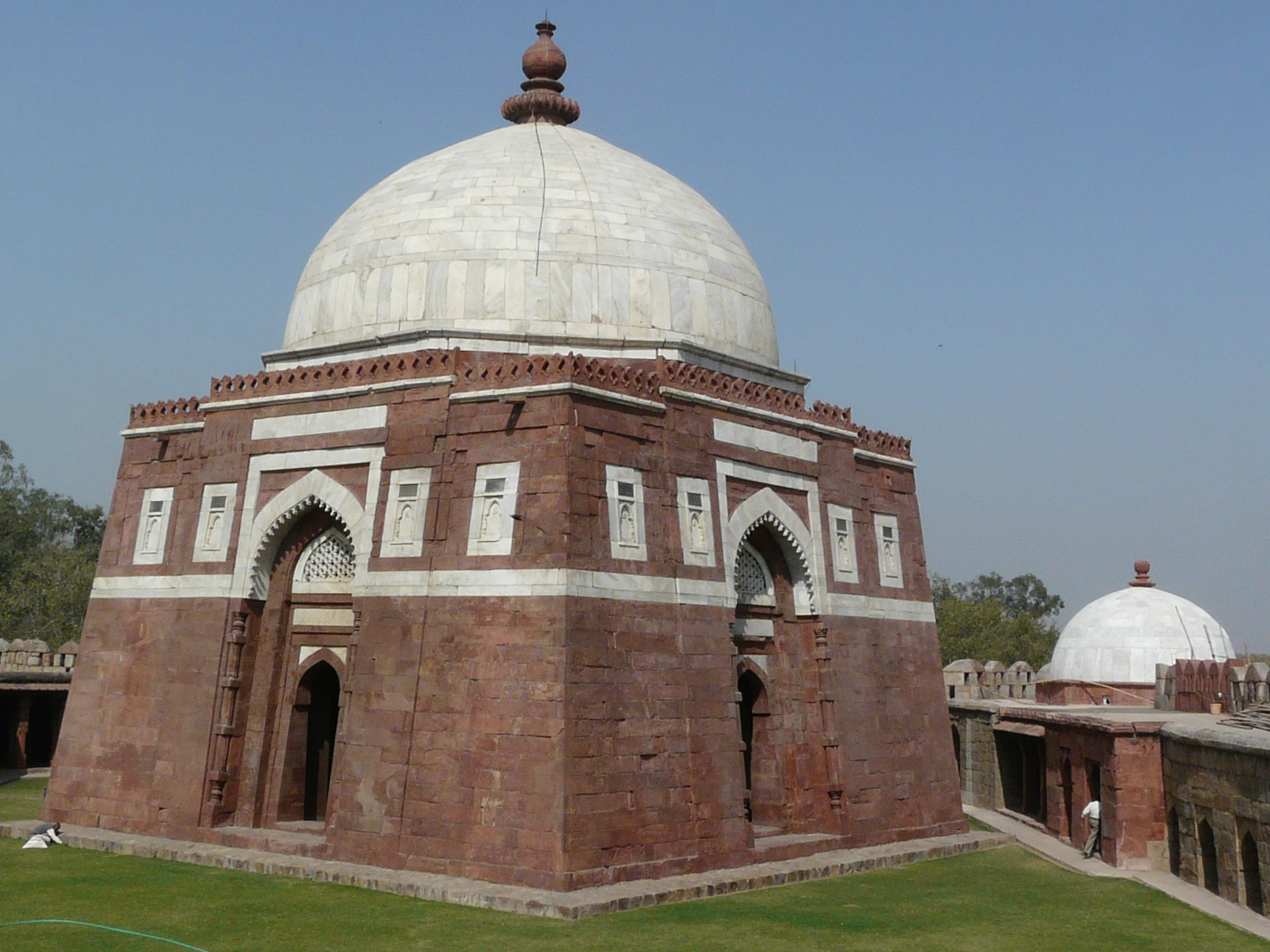
Tomb of Ghiyath al-Din Tughluq (d. 1325), Delhi

The tomb of Shah Rukn-e-Alam (built 1320 to 1324) in Multan, Pakistan is a large octagonal brick-built mausoleum with polychrome glazed decoration that remains much closer to the styles of Iran and Afghanistan. Timber is also used internally. This was the earliest major monument of the Tughlaq dynasty (1320–1413), built during the unsustainable expansion of its massive territory. It was built for a Sufi saint rather than a sultan, and most of the many Tughlaq tombs are much less exuberant. The tomb of the founder of the dynasty, Ghiyath al-Din Tughluq (d. 1325) is more austere, but impressive; like a Hindu temple, it is topped with a small amalaka and a round finial like a kalasha. Unlike the buildings mentioned previously, it completely lacks carved texts, and sits in a compound with high walls and battlements. Both these tombs have external walls sloping slightly inwards, by 25° in the Delhi tomb, like many fortifications including the ruined Tughlaqabad Fort opposite the tomb, intended as the new capital.

The Tughlaqs had a corps of government architects and builders, and in this and other roles employed many Hindus. They left many buildings, and a standardized dynastic style. The third sultan, Firuz Shah (r. 1351–88) is said to have designed buildings himself, and was the longest ruler and greatest builder of the dynasty. His Firoz Shah Palace Complex (started 1354) at Hisar, Haryana is a ruin, but parts are in fair condition. Some buildings from his reign take forms that had been rare or unknown in Islamic buildings. He was buried in the large Hauz Khas Complex in Delhi, with many other buildings from his period and the later Sultanate, including several small domed pavilions supported only by columns.

By this time Islamic architecture in India had adopted some features of earlier Indian architecture, such as the use of a high plinth, and often mouldings around its edges, as well as columns and brackets and hypostyle halls. After the death of Firoz the Tughlaqs declined, and the following Delhi dynasties were weak. Most of the monumental buildings constructed were tombs, although the impressive Lodi Gardens in Delhi (adorned with fountains, charbagh gardens, ponds, tombs and mosques) were constructed by the late Lodi dynasty. The architecture of other regional Muslim states was often more impressive.

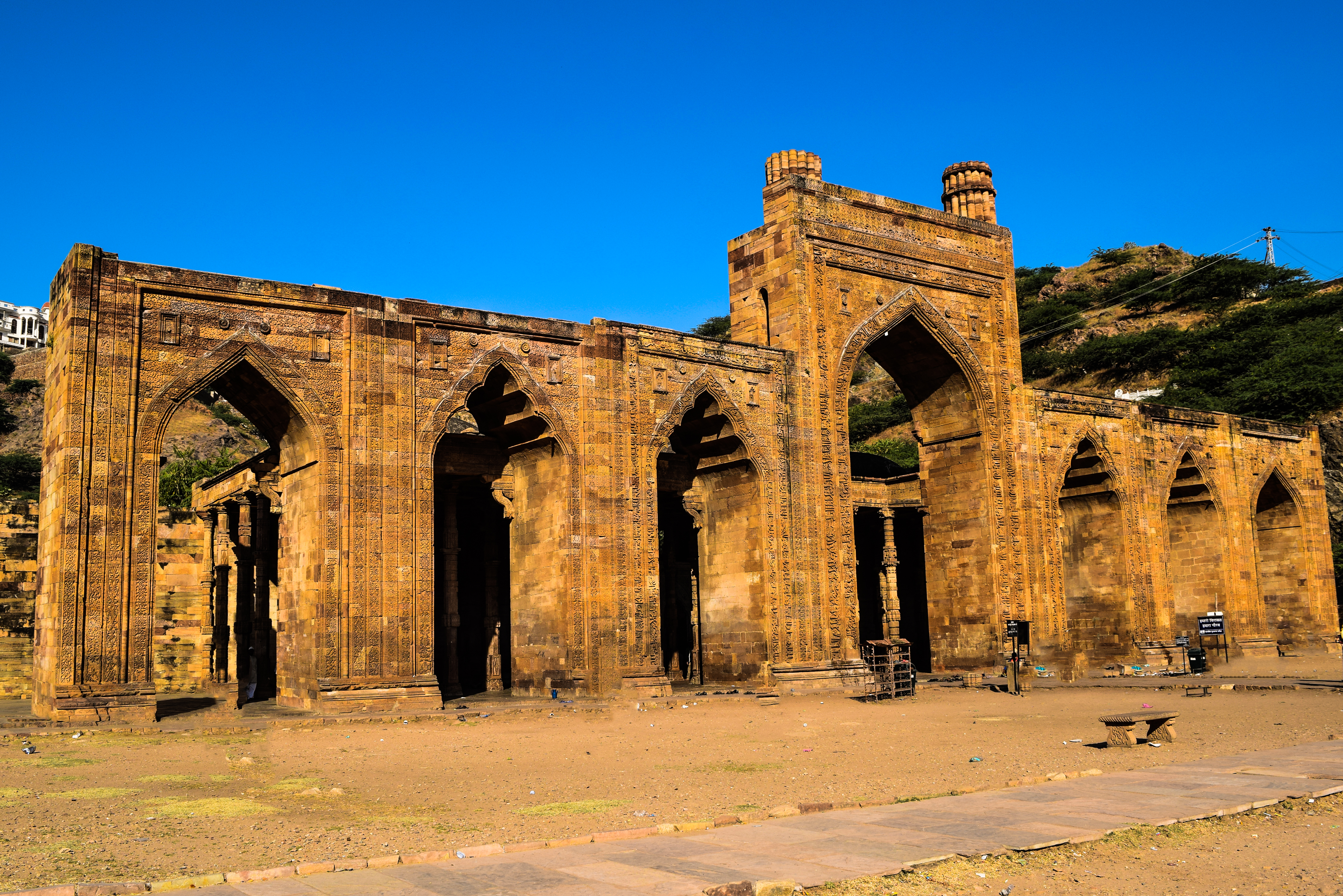
Screen of the Adhai Din Ka Jhonpra mosque, Ajmer, c. 1229; Corbel arches, some cusped.

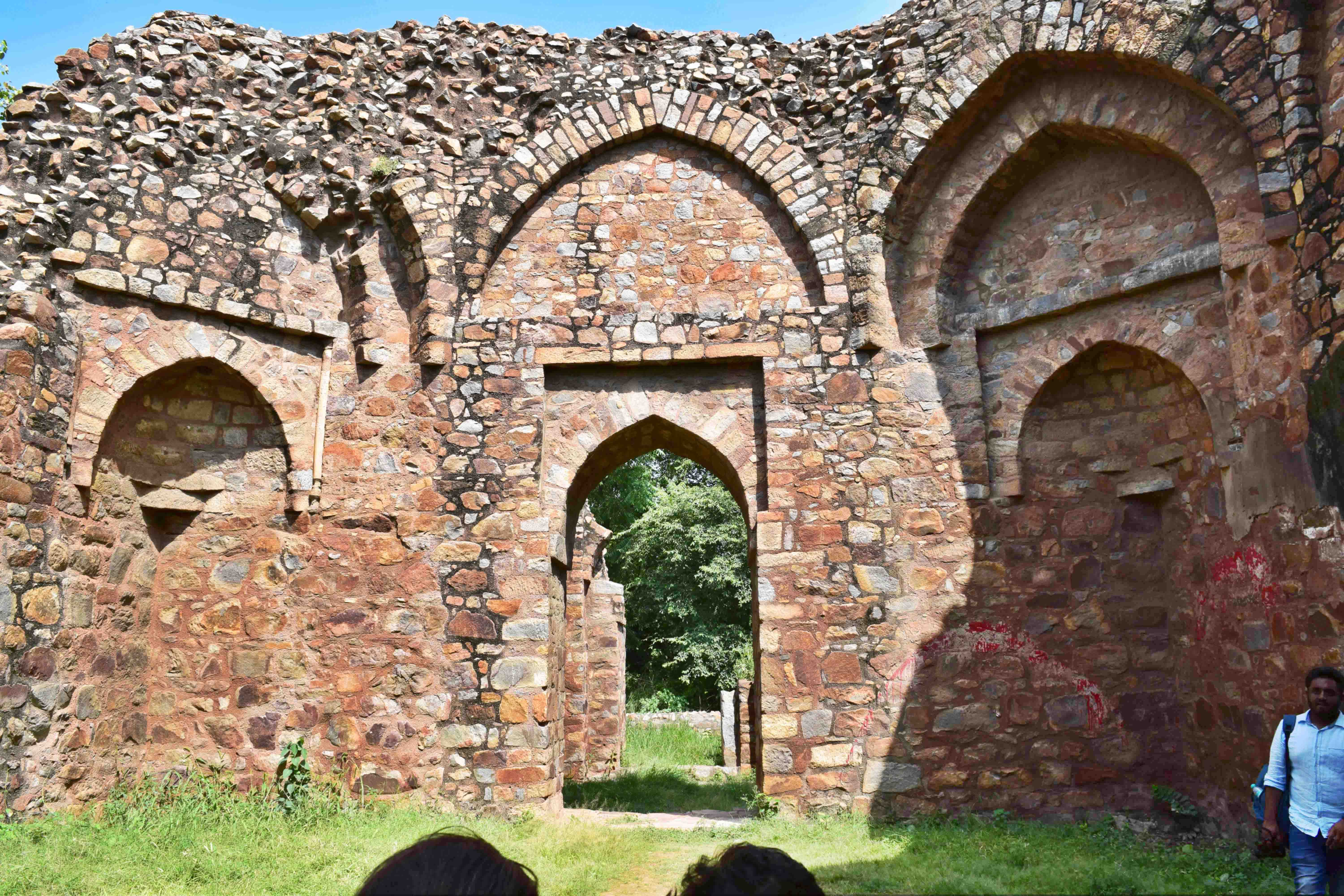
Possibly the first "true" arches in India; Tomb of Balban (d. 1287) in Delhi

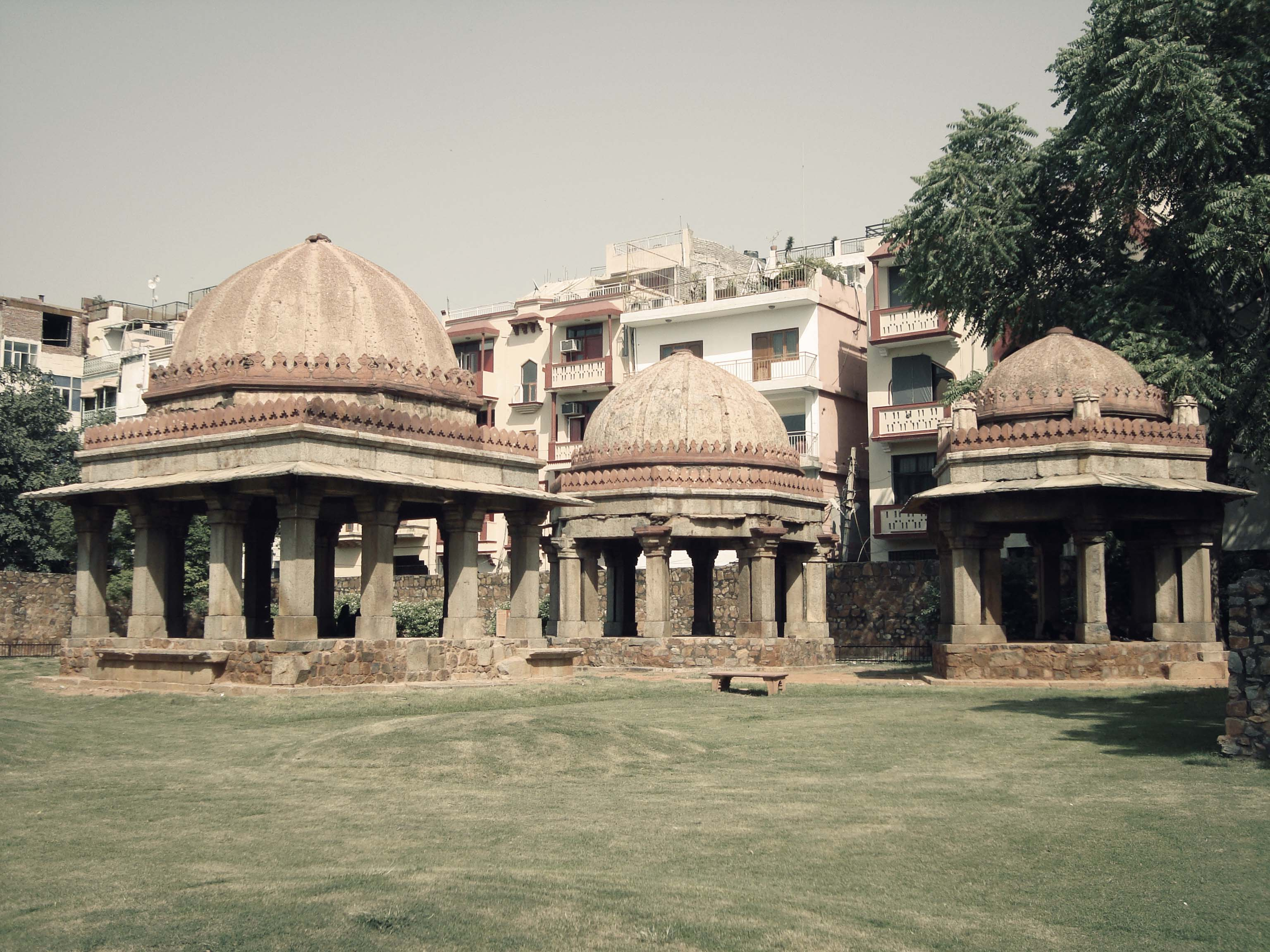
Pavilions in the Hauz Khas Complex, Delhi

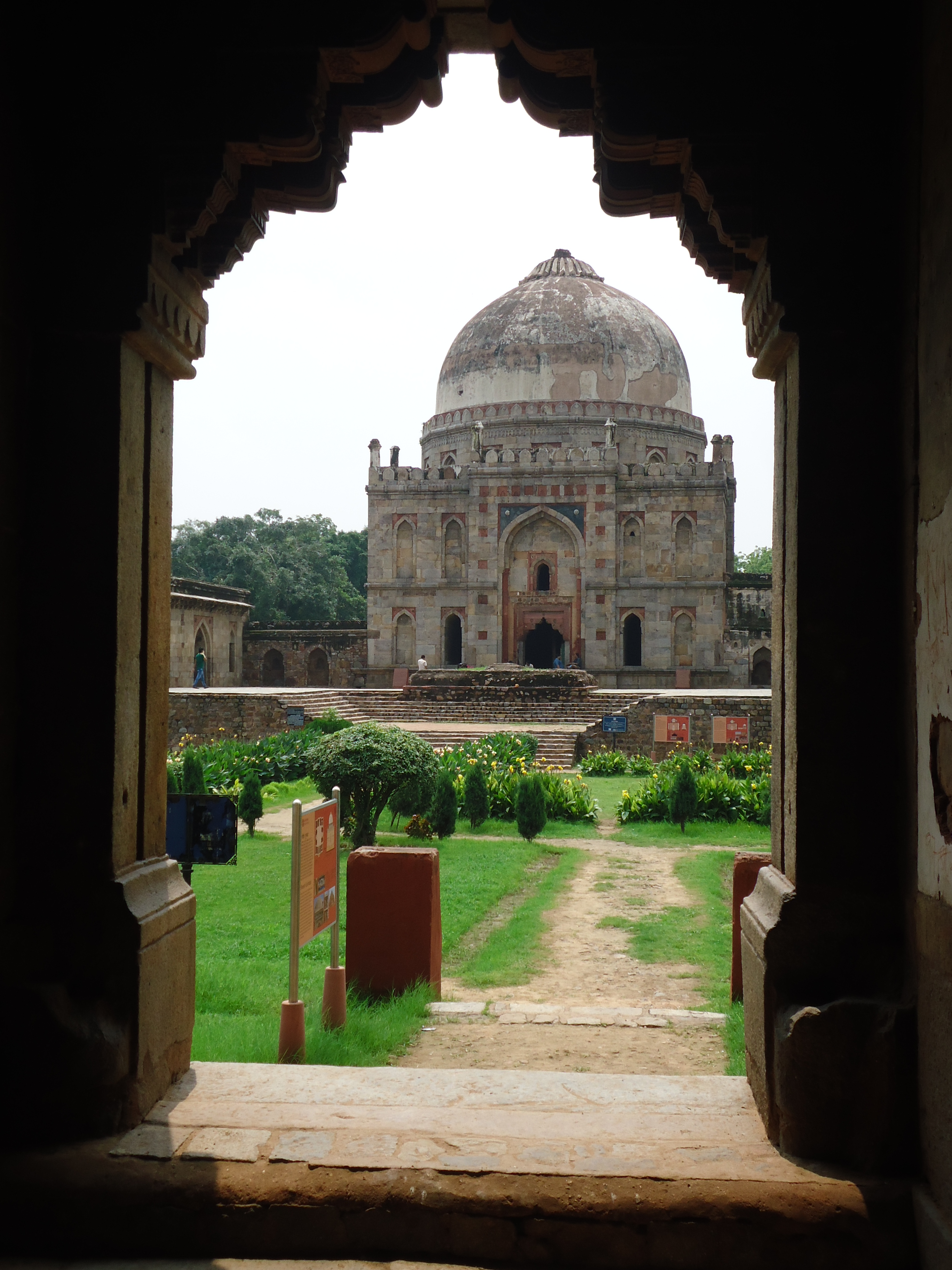
Tomb of Sikander Lodi in the Lodi Gardens, Delhi

== Pre-Mughal regional architecture ==
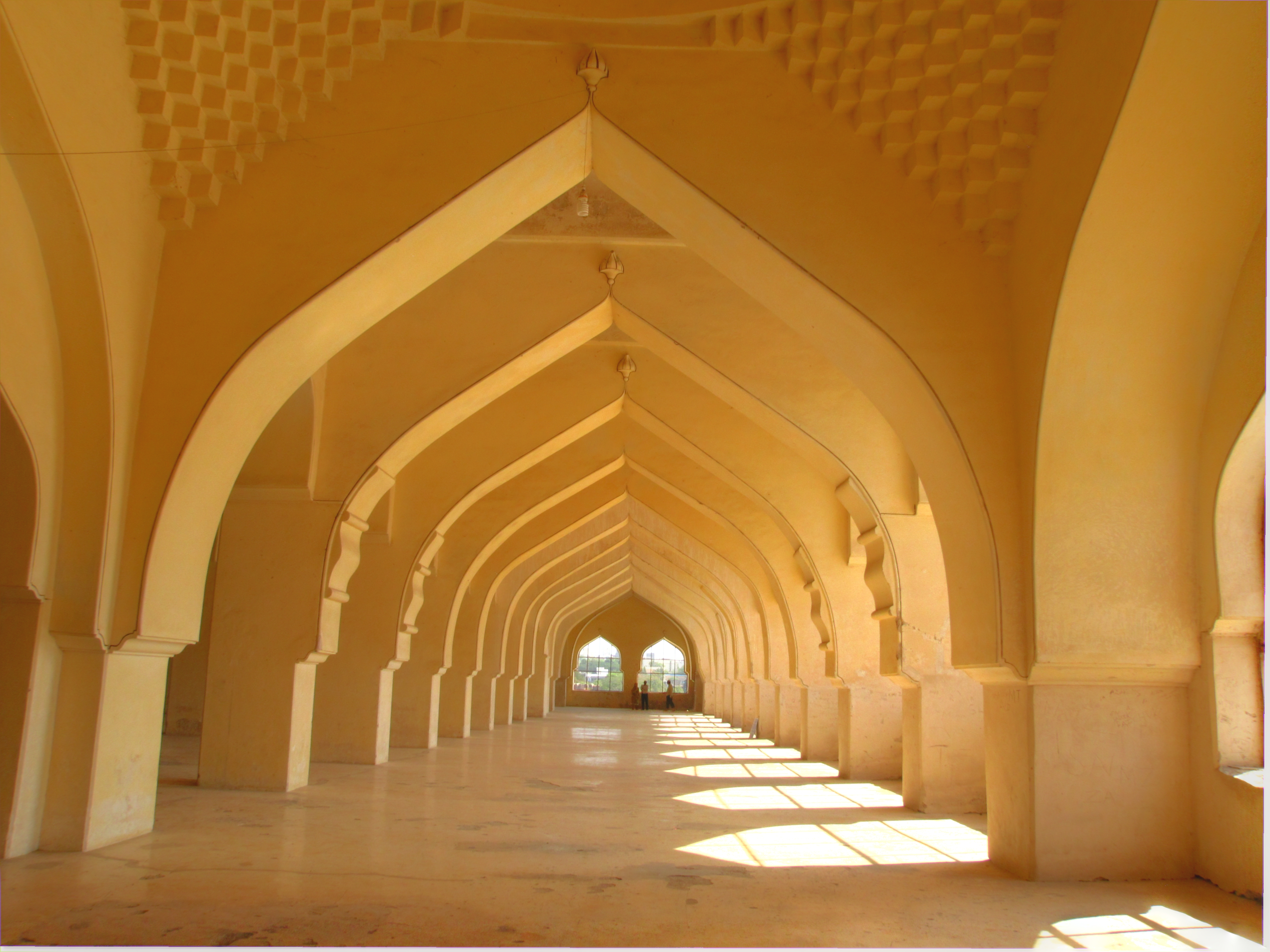
Arches in the main mosque at Gulbarga, 1367

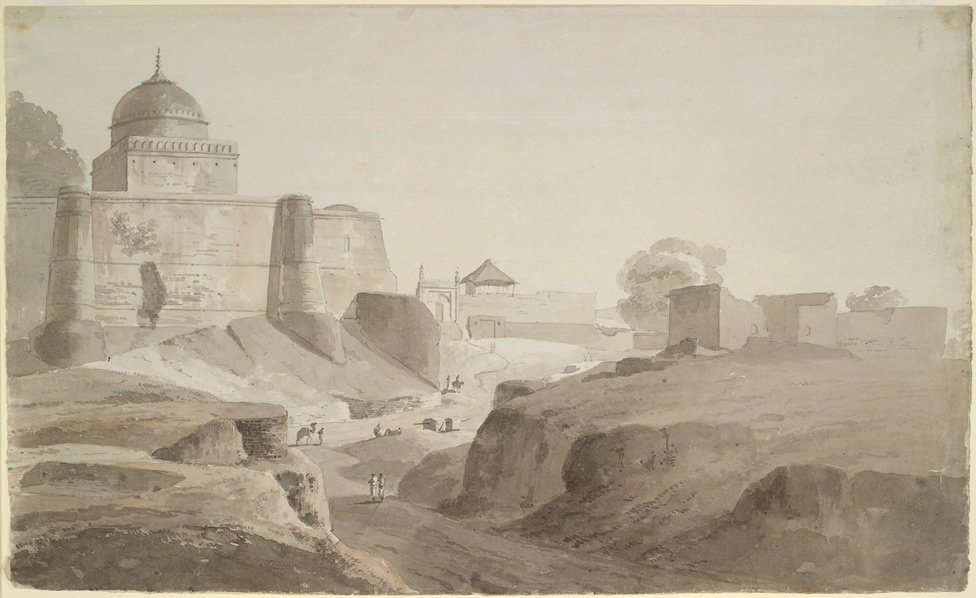
Shahi Jama Masjid, Sambhal at Sambhal in Uttar Pradesh (1789). Pencil and wash drawing, 29.7 x 48.8 cm. British Library, London

Significant regional styles developed in the independent sultanates formed when the Tughlaq empire weakened in the mid-14th century, and lasted until most were absorbed into the Mughal Empire in the 16th century. The sultanates of the Deccan Plateau, Gujarat, Bengal and Kashmir are discussed below. The architecture of the Malwa and Jaunpur sultanates has also left some significant buildings.

=== Deccan sultanates ===
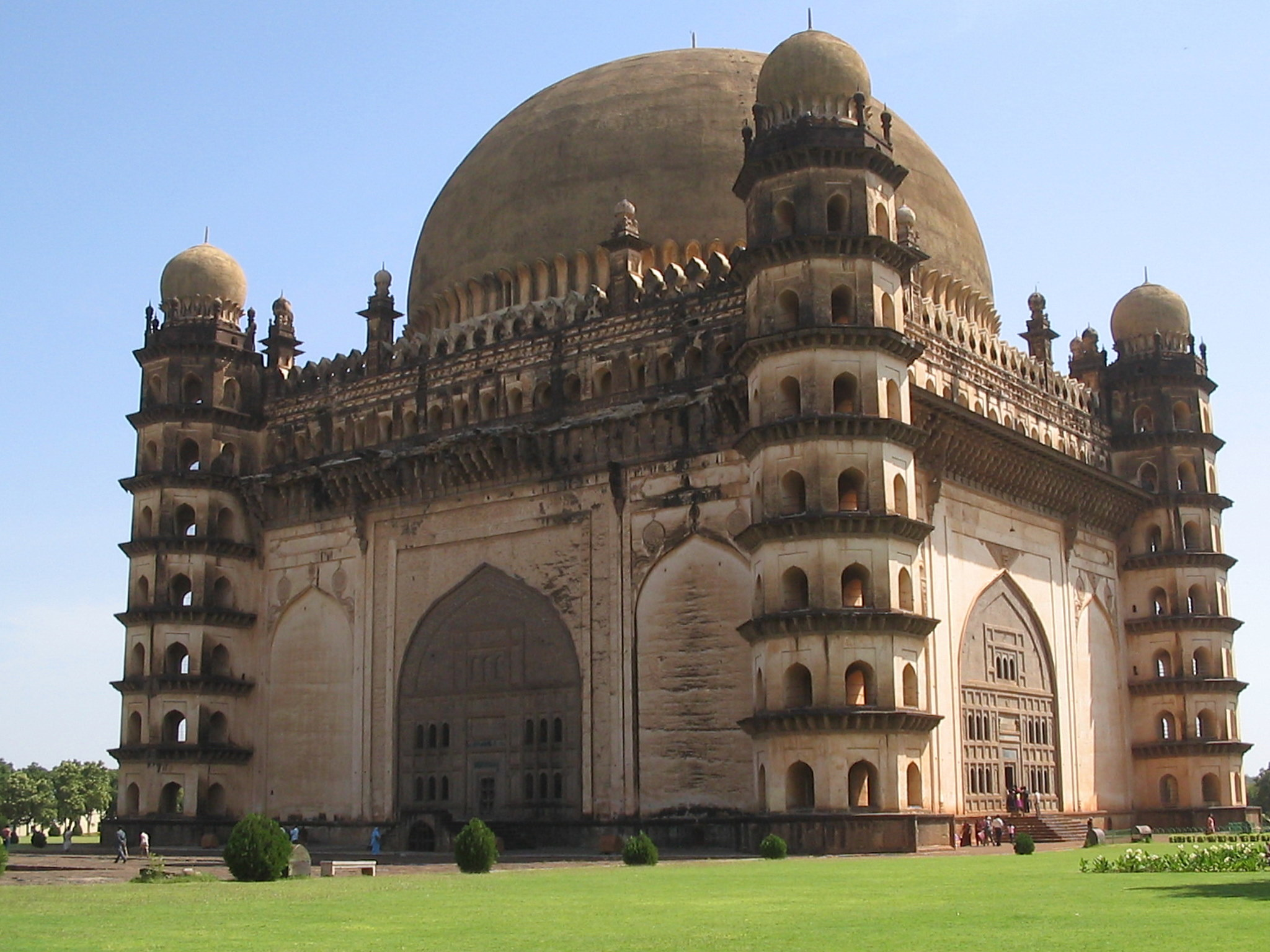
The Gol Gumbaz mausoleum, c. 1650, Bijapur Sultanate in Deccani style, the world's 2nd largest pre-modern dome after Hagia Sophia in Istanbul.

The Bahmani Sultanate in the Deccan broke away from the Tughlaqs in 1347, and ruled from Gulbarga, Karnataka and then Bidar until overrun by the Mughals in 1527. The main mosque (1367) in the large Kalaburagi Fort or citadel is unusual in having no courtyard. There are a total of 75 domes, all small and shallow and small except for a large one above the mihrab and four lesser ones at the corners. The large interior has a central hypostyle space, and wide aisles with "transverse" arches springing from unusually low down (illustrated). This distinctive feature is found in other Bahmanid buildings, and probably reflects Iranian influence, which is seen in other features such as a four-iwan plan and glazed tiles, some actually imported from Iran, used elsewhere. The architect of the mosque is said to have been Persian.

Some later Bahminid royal tombs are double, with two units of the usual rectangle-with-dome form combined, one for the ruler and the other for his family, as at the Haft Dombad ("Seven Domes") group of royal tombs outside Gulbarga. The Mahmud Gawan Madrasa (begun 1460s) is a large ruined madrasa "of wholly Iranian design" in Bidar founded by a chief minister, with parts decorated in glazed tiles imported by sea from Iran. Outside the city the Ashtur tombs are a group of eight large domed royal tombs. These have domes which are slightly pulled in at the base, predating the onion domes of Mughal architecture.

The Qutb Shahi dynasty of Hyderabad, not absorbed by the Mughals until 1687, greatly developed the city and its surrounding region, building many mosques such as the Mecca Masjid, Khairtabad Mosque, Hayat Bakshi Mosque and Toli Mosque, as well as the Golconda Fort, tombs of the Qutb Shahis, Charminar, Char Kaman and Taramati Baradari. Tipu Sultans Summer Palace in Bengaluru is also a beautiful example.

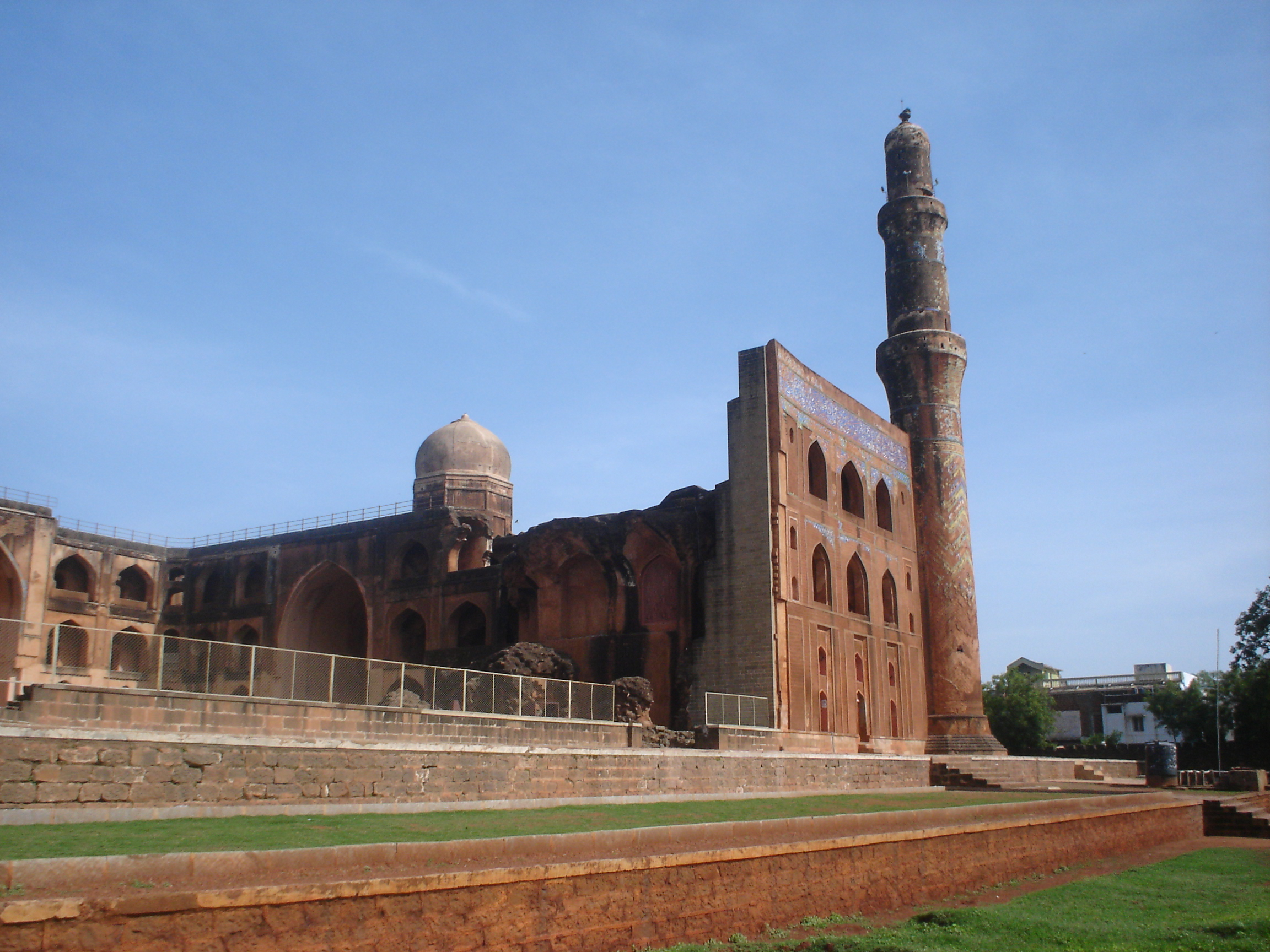
Mahmud Gawan Madrasa (begun construction in the 1460s).

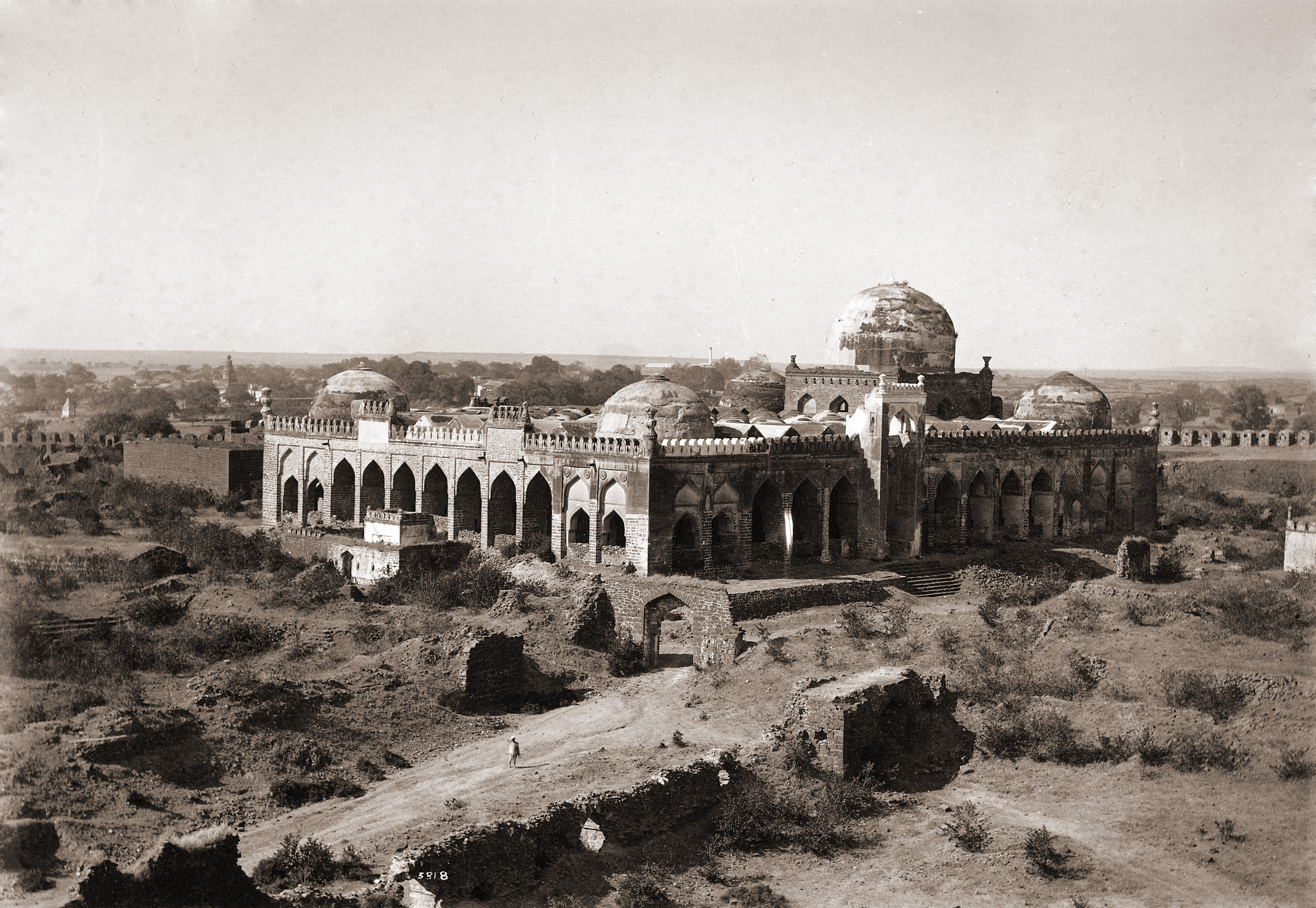
Jama Mosque Gulbarga (b. 1367), pictured in 1880.

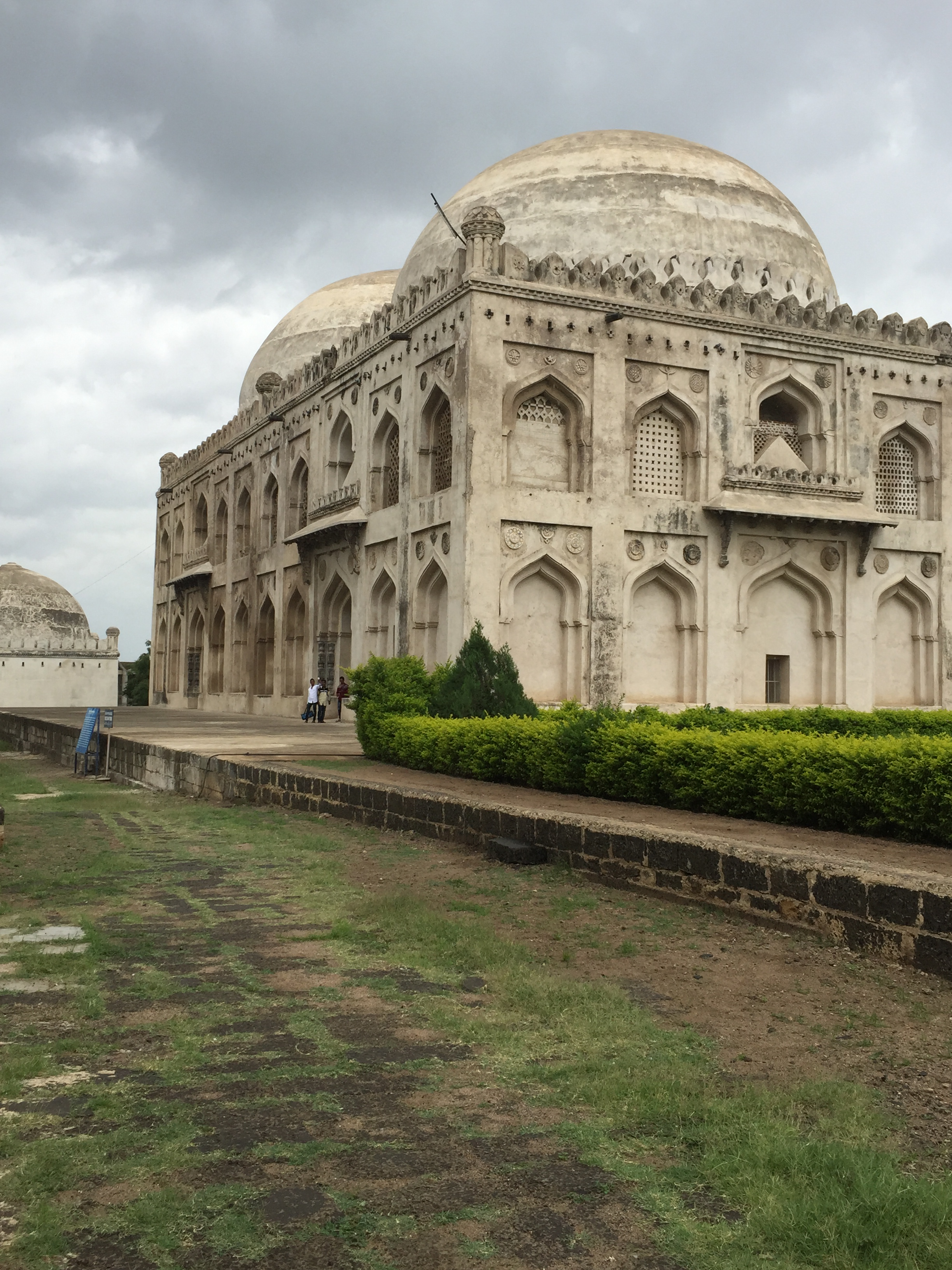
"Double" tomb of Taj ud-Din Firuz Shah (d. 1422), in Gulbarga

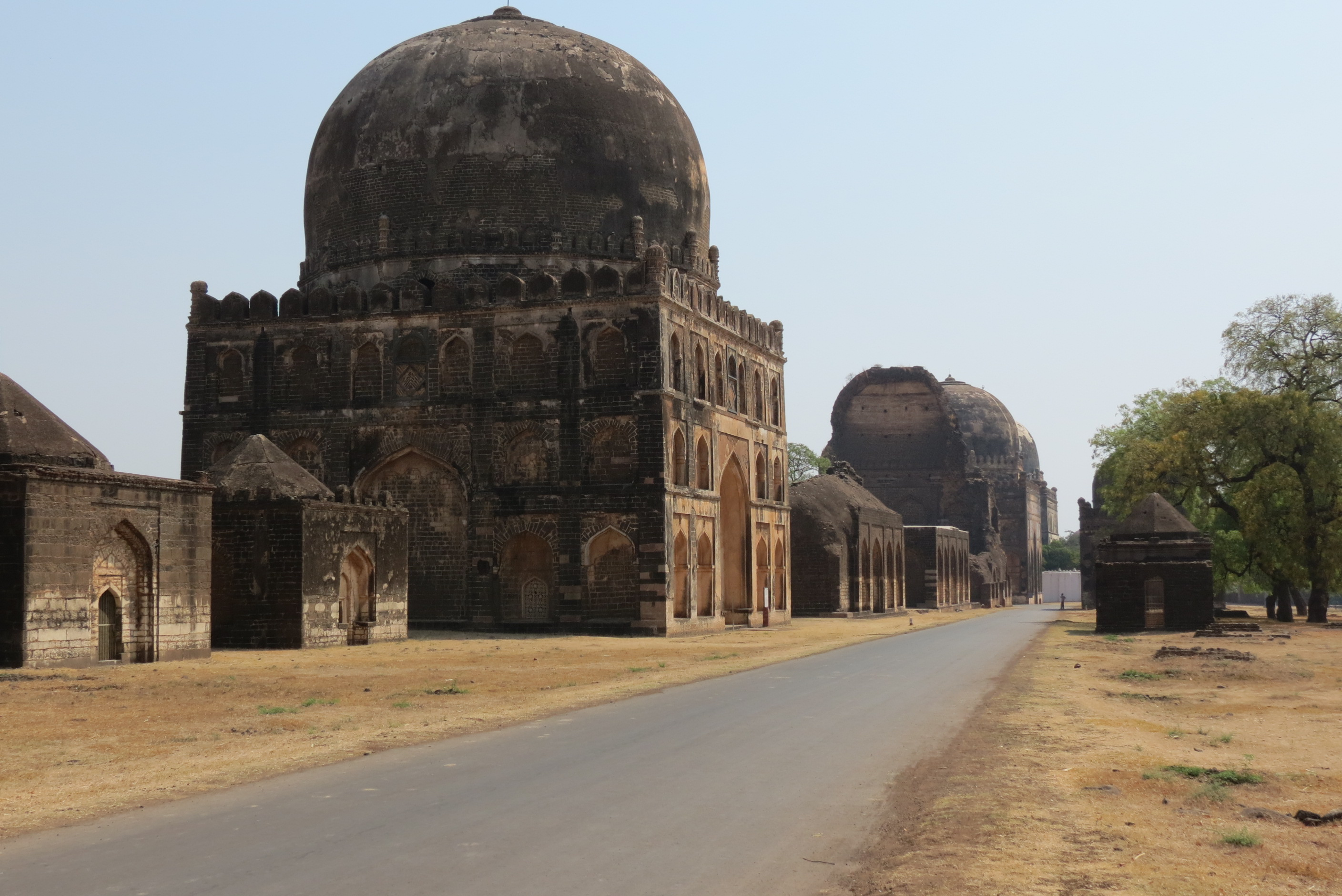
A row of Bahminid tombs at Ashtur, Bidar

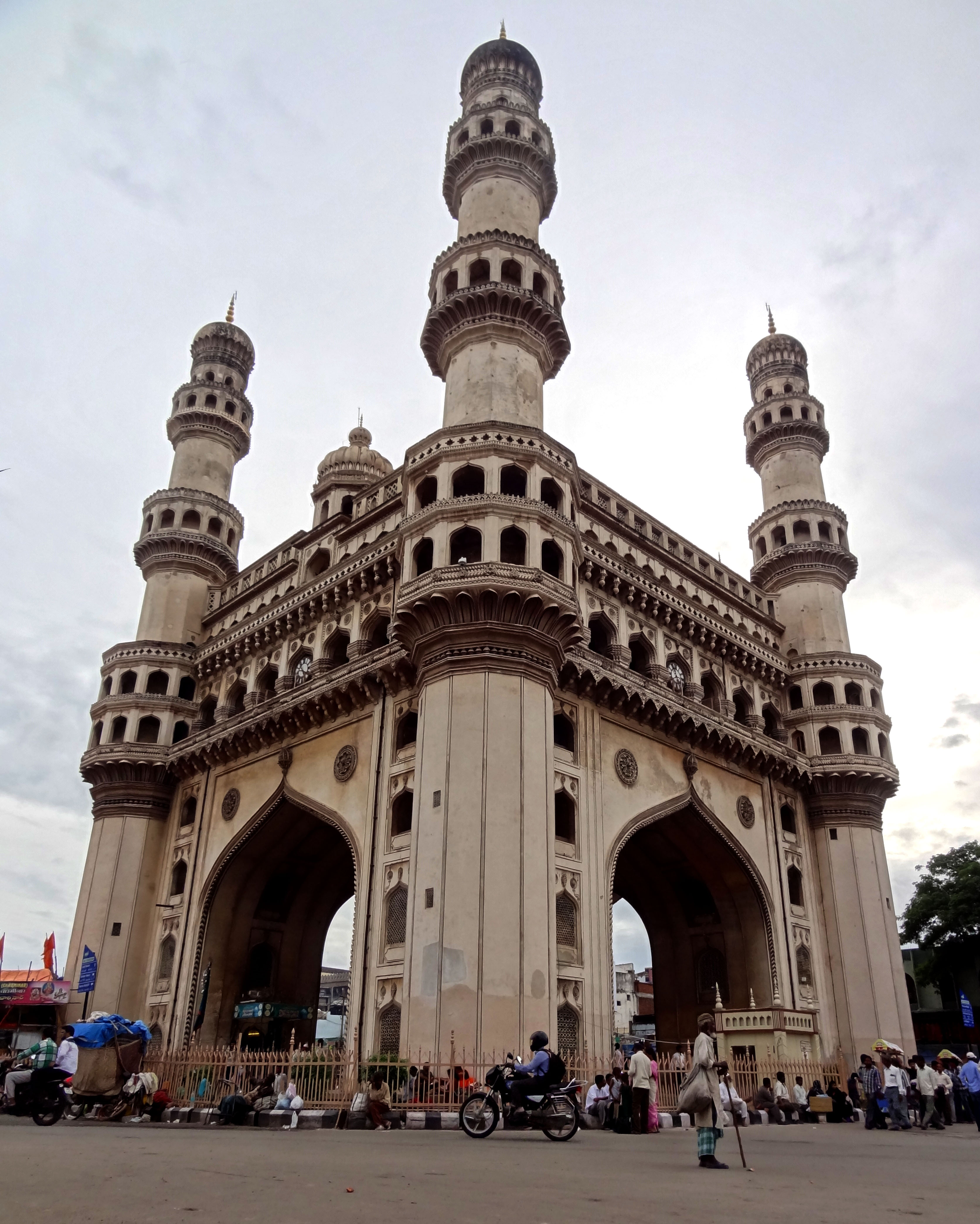
Charminar at the Old City in Hyderabad, 1591

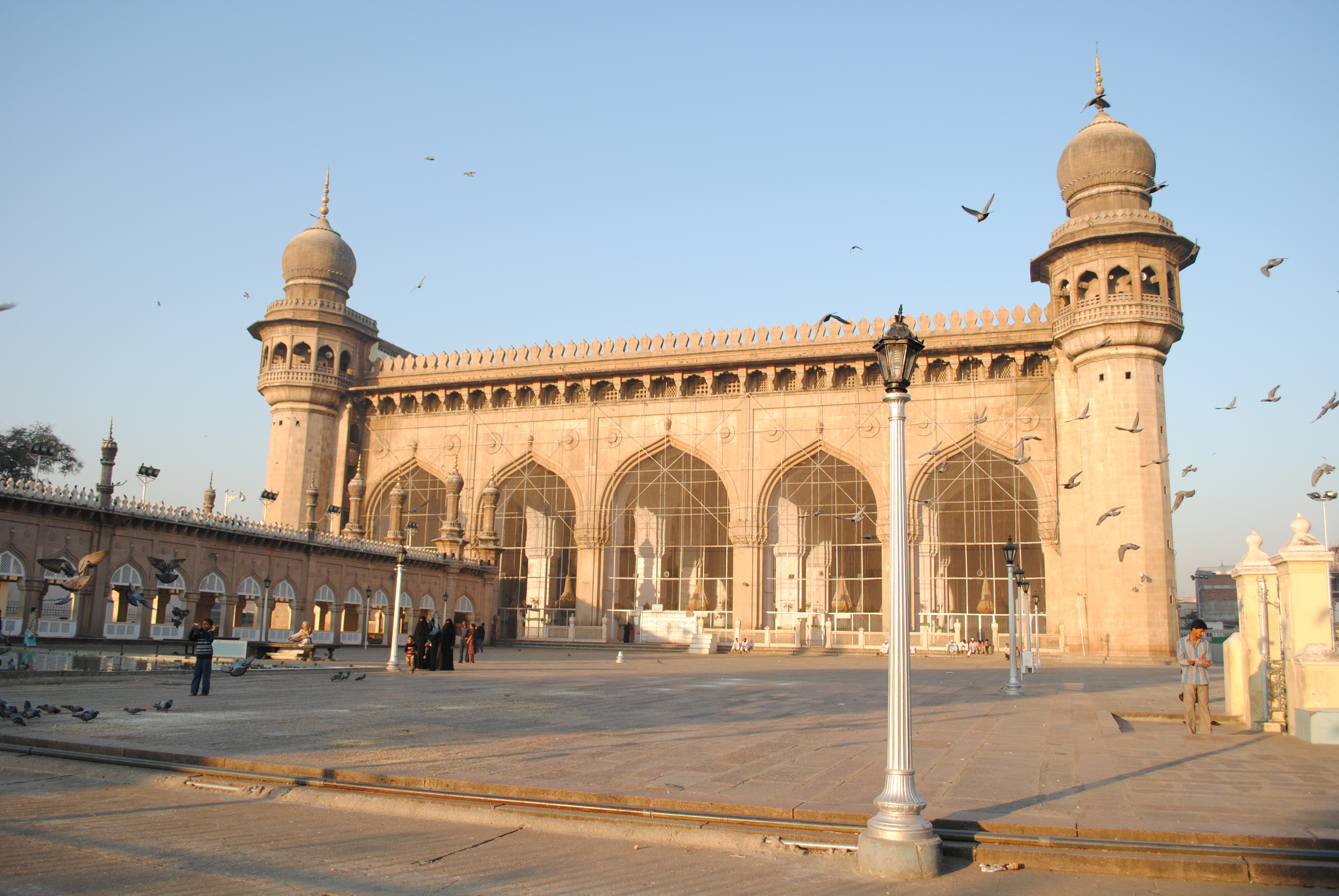
Makkah Masjid, Hyderabad

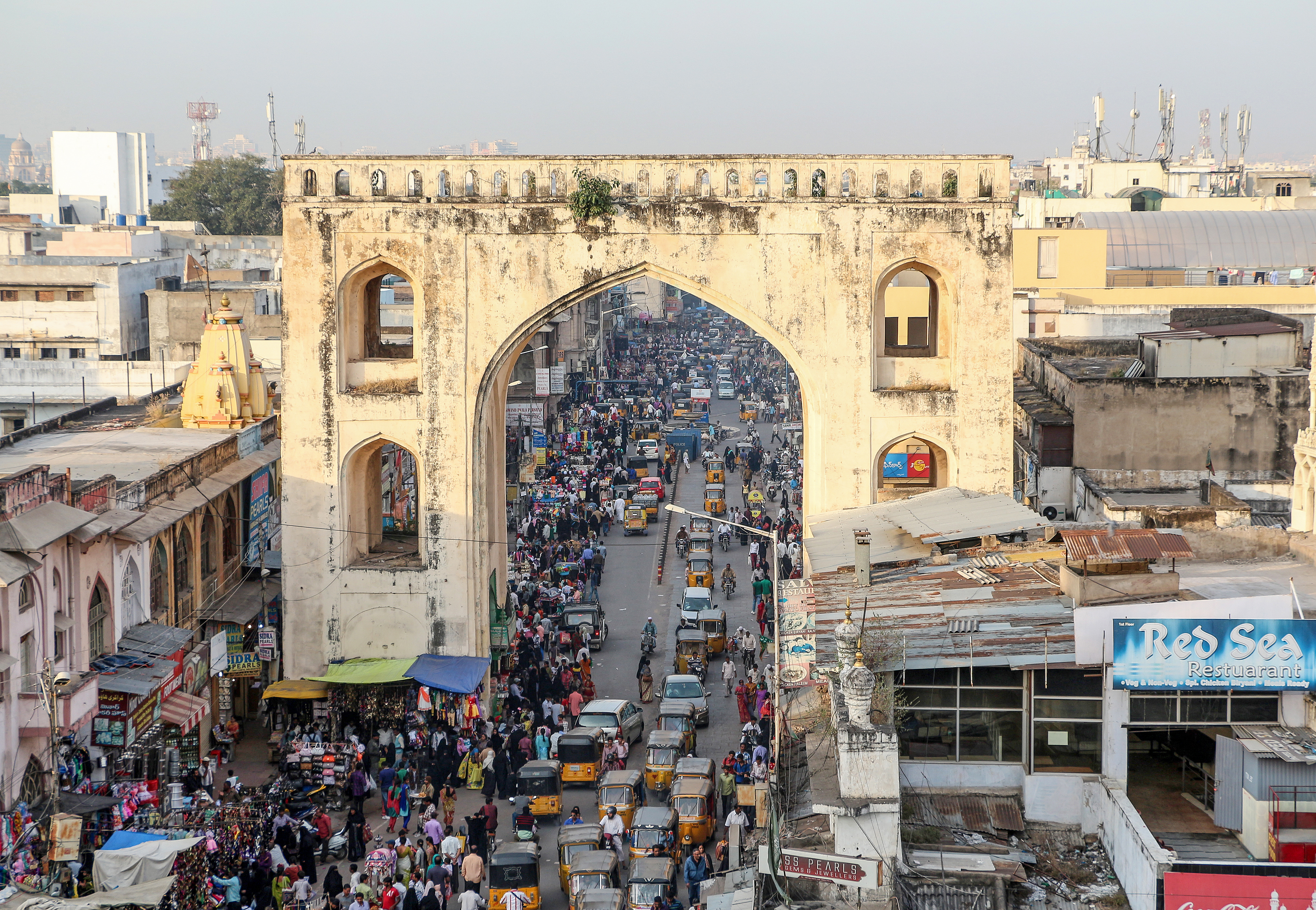
Char Kaman in Hyderabad

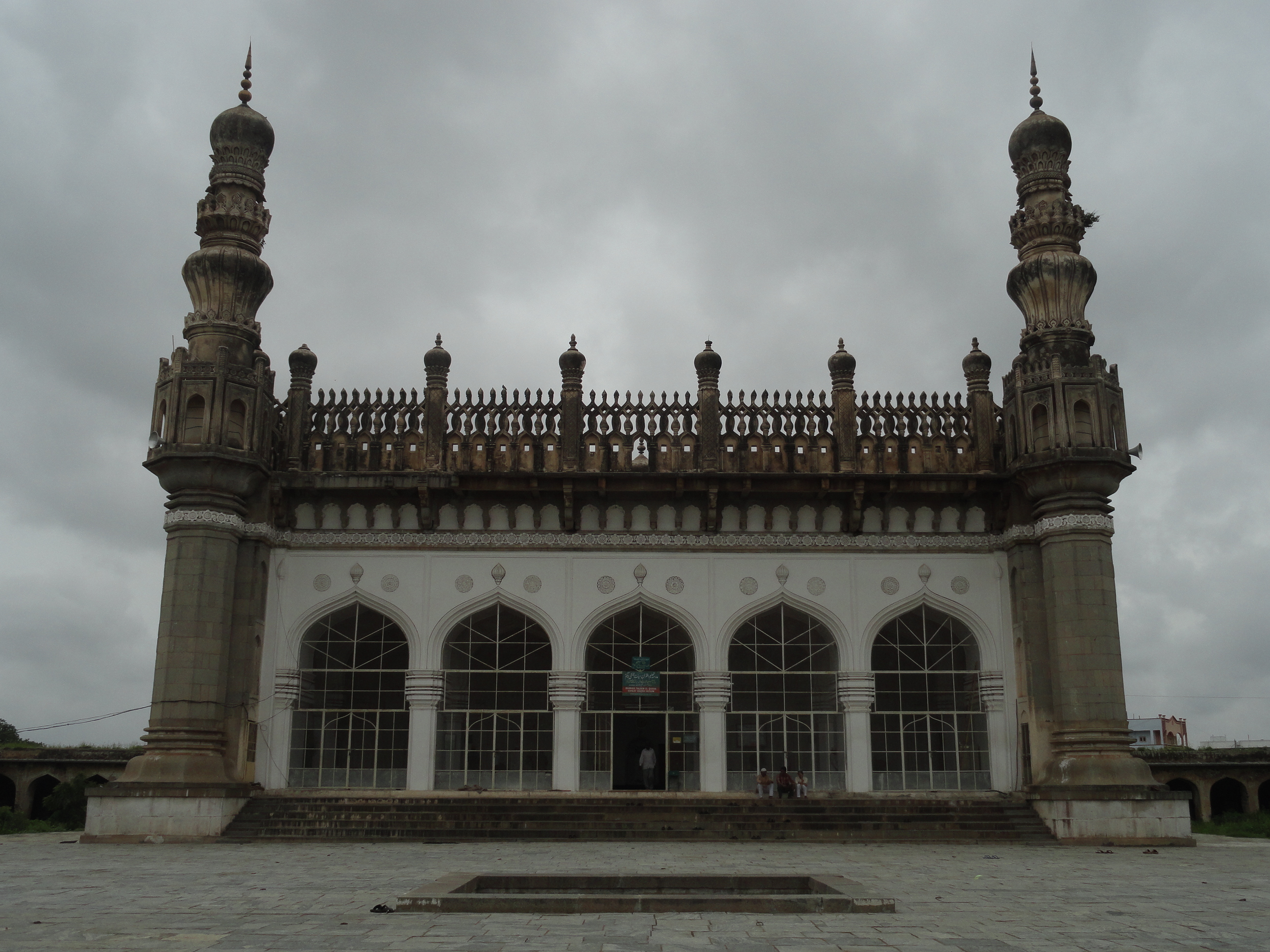
Hayat Bakshi Mosque in Hyderabad

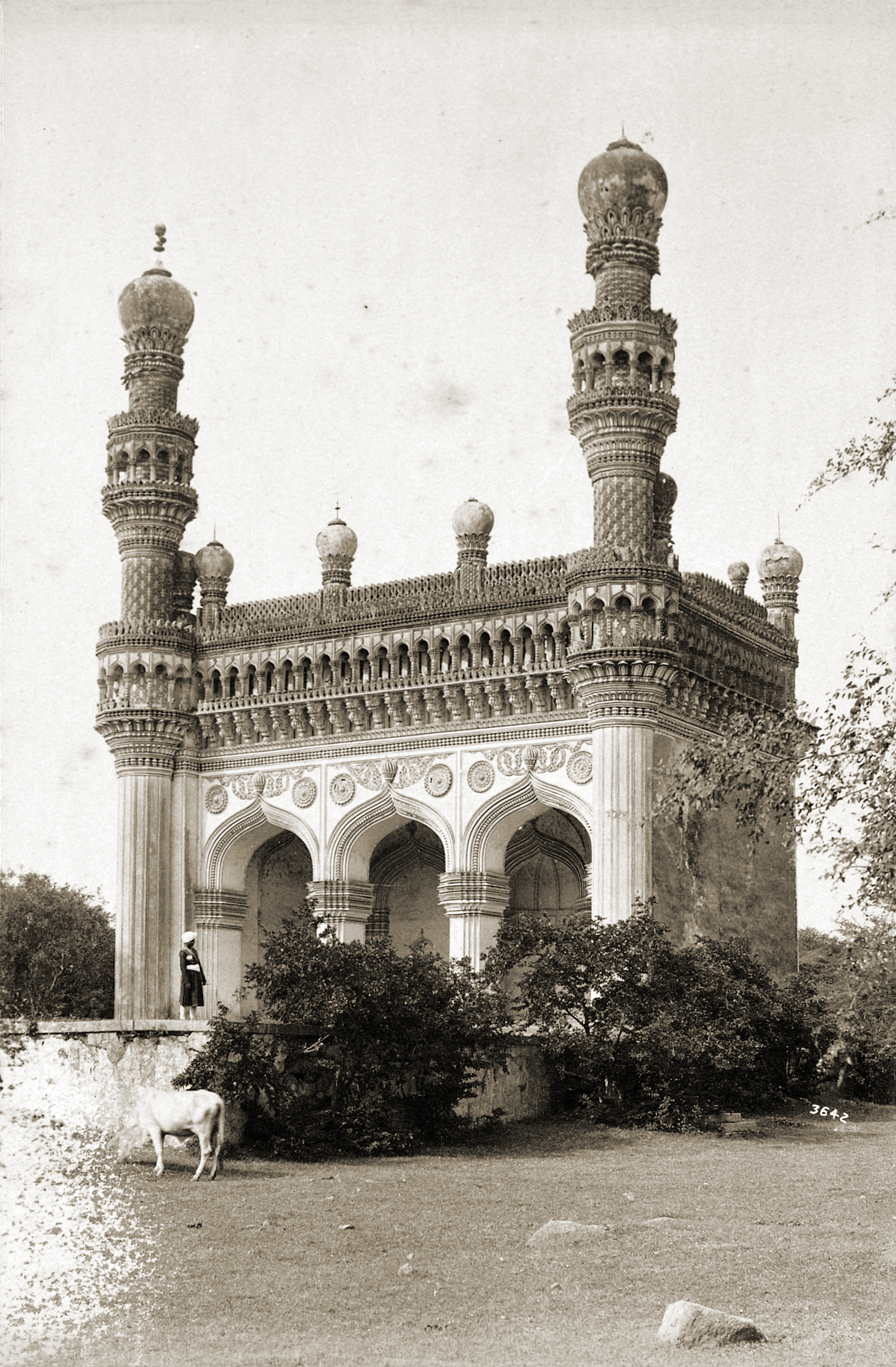
Khairtabad Mosque

=== Bengal Sultanate ===
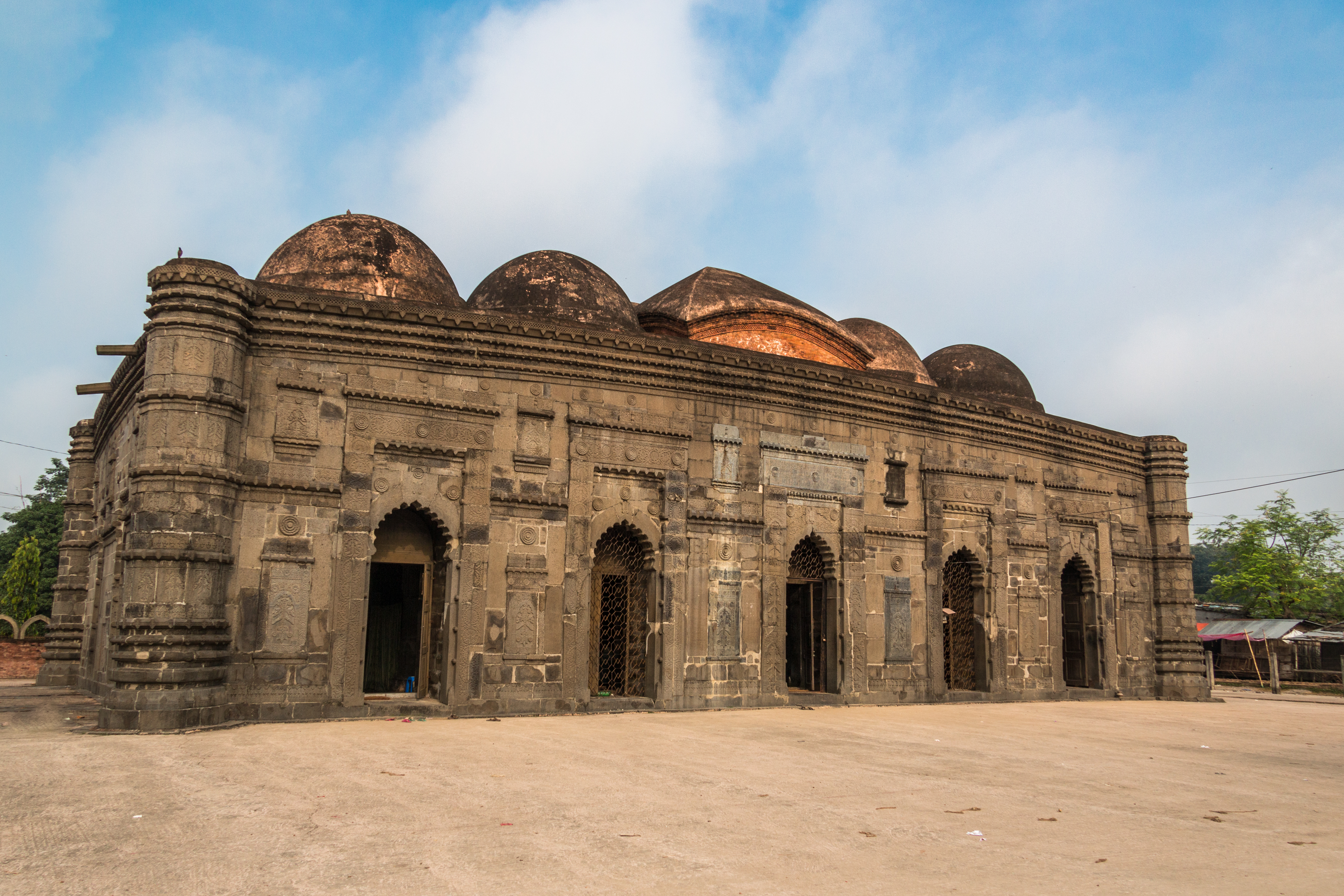
Choto Sona Mosque (around 1500)

The Bengal Sultanate (1352–1576) normally used brick as the primary construction material of large buildings, as pre-Islamic buildings had done. Stone had to be imported to most of Bengal, whereas clay for bricks is plentiful. But stone was used for columns and prominent details, usually re-used from Hindu or Buddhist temples. The early 15th century Eklakhi Mausoleum at Pandua, Malda or Adina, is often taken to be the earliest surviving square single-domed Islamic building in Bengal, the standard form of smaller mosques and mausoleums. But there is a small mosque at Molla Simla, Hooghly district, that is possibly from 1375, earlier than the mausoleum. The Eklakhi Mausoleum is large and has several features that were to become common in the Bengal style, including a slightly curved cornice, large round decorative buttresses at the corners, and decoration in carved terracotta brick.

These features are also seen in the Choto Sona Mosque (around 1500), which is in stone, unusually for Bengal, but shares the style and mixes domes and a curving "paddy" roof based on village house roofs made of vegetable thatch. Such roofs feature even more strongly in later Bengal Hindu temple architecture, with types such as the do-chala, Jor-bangla Style, and char-chala. For larger mosques, Bengali architects multiplied the numbers of domes, with a nine-domed formula (three rows of three) being one option, surviving in four examples, all 15th or 16th century and now in Bangladesh, although there were others with larger numbers of domes.

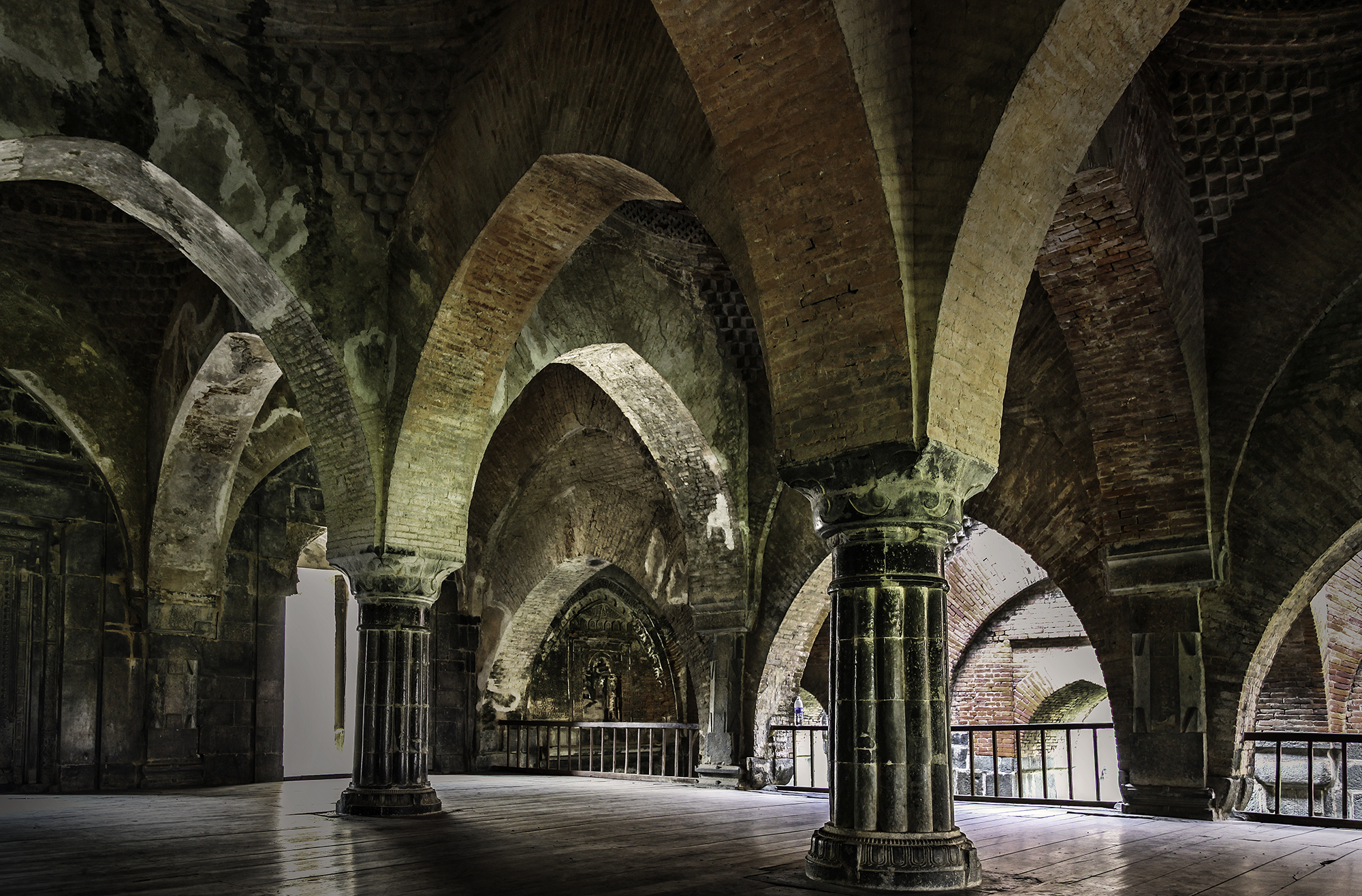
Interior of the hypostyle hall of the Adina Mosque

Buildings in the style are the Nine Dome Mosque and the Sixty Dome Mosque (completed 1459) and several other buildings in the Mosque City of Bagerhat, an abandoned city in Bangladesh now featured as a UNESCO World Heritage Site. These show other distinctive features, such as a multiplicity of doors and mihrabs; the Sixty Dome Mosque has 26 doors (11 at the front, 7 on each side, and one in the rear). These increased the light and ventilation. Further mosques include the Baro Shona Masjid; the Pathrail Mosque, the Bagha Mosque, the Darasbari Mosque, and the Kusumba Mosque. Single-domed mosques include the Singar Mosque, and the Shankarpasha Shahi Masjid.

Both capitals of the Bengal Sultanate, first Pandua or Adina, then from 1450 Gauda or Gaur, started to be abandoned soon after the conquest of the sultanate by the Mughals in 1576, leaving many grand buildings, mostly religious. The materials from secular buildings were recycled by builders in later periods. While minarets are conspicuously absent in most mosques, the Firoz Minar was built in Gauda to commemorate Bengali military victories.

The ruined Adina Mosque (1374–75) is very large, which is unusual in Bengal, with a barrel vaulted central hall flanked by hypostyle areas. It is said to be the largest mosque in the sub-continent, and modeled after the Ayvan-e Kasra of Ctesiphon, Iraq, as well as the Umayyad Mosque of Damascus. The heavy rainfall in Bengal necessitated large roofed spaces, and the nine-domed mosque, which allowed a large area to be covered, was more popular there than anywhere else. After the Islamic consolidation of Bengal was complete, some local features continued, especially in smaller buildings, but the Mughals used their usual style in imperial commissions.

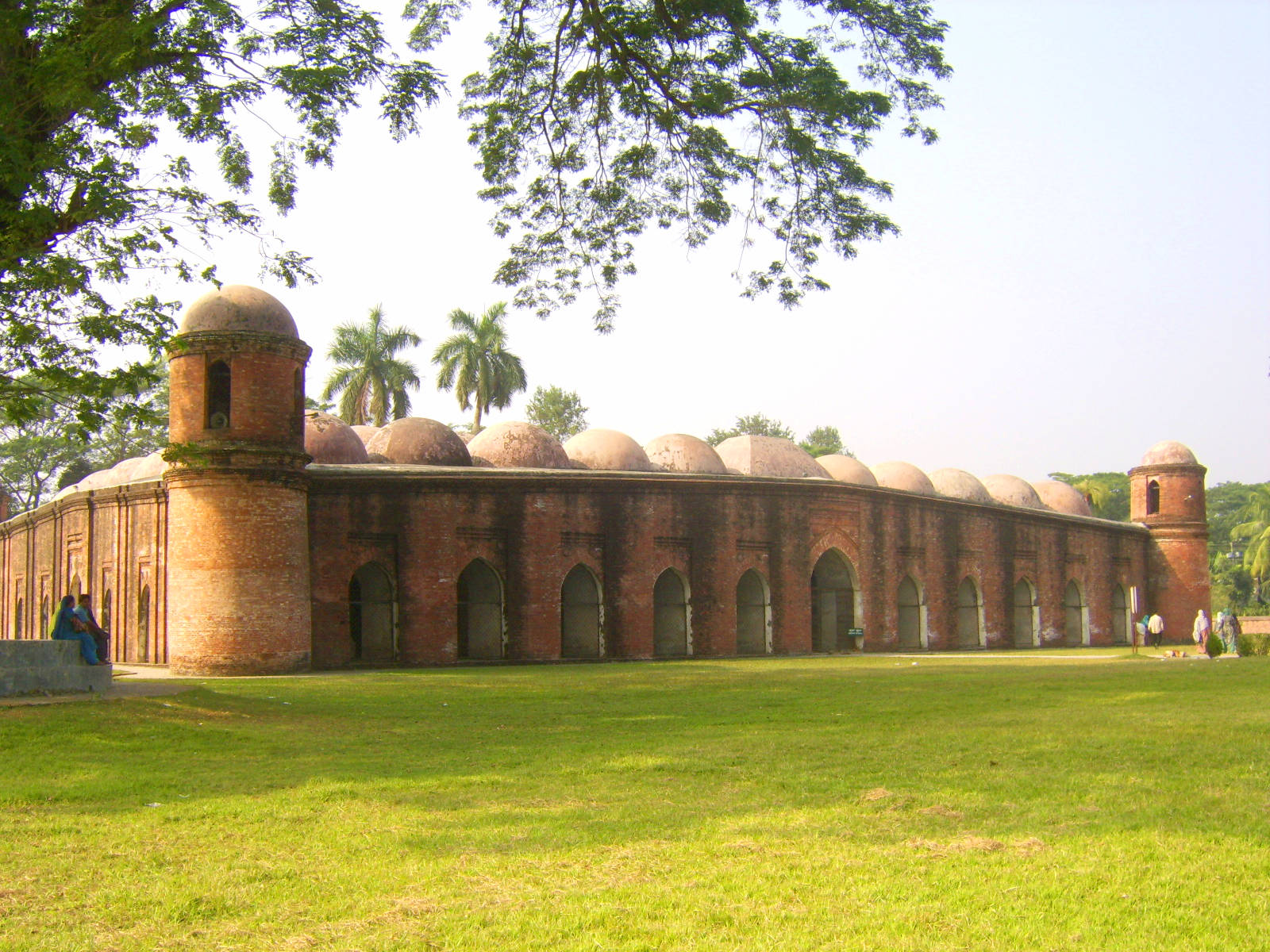
Shat Gombuj (Sixty Dome) Mosque in Bagerhat, Bangladesh

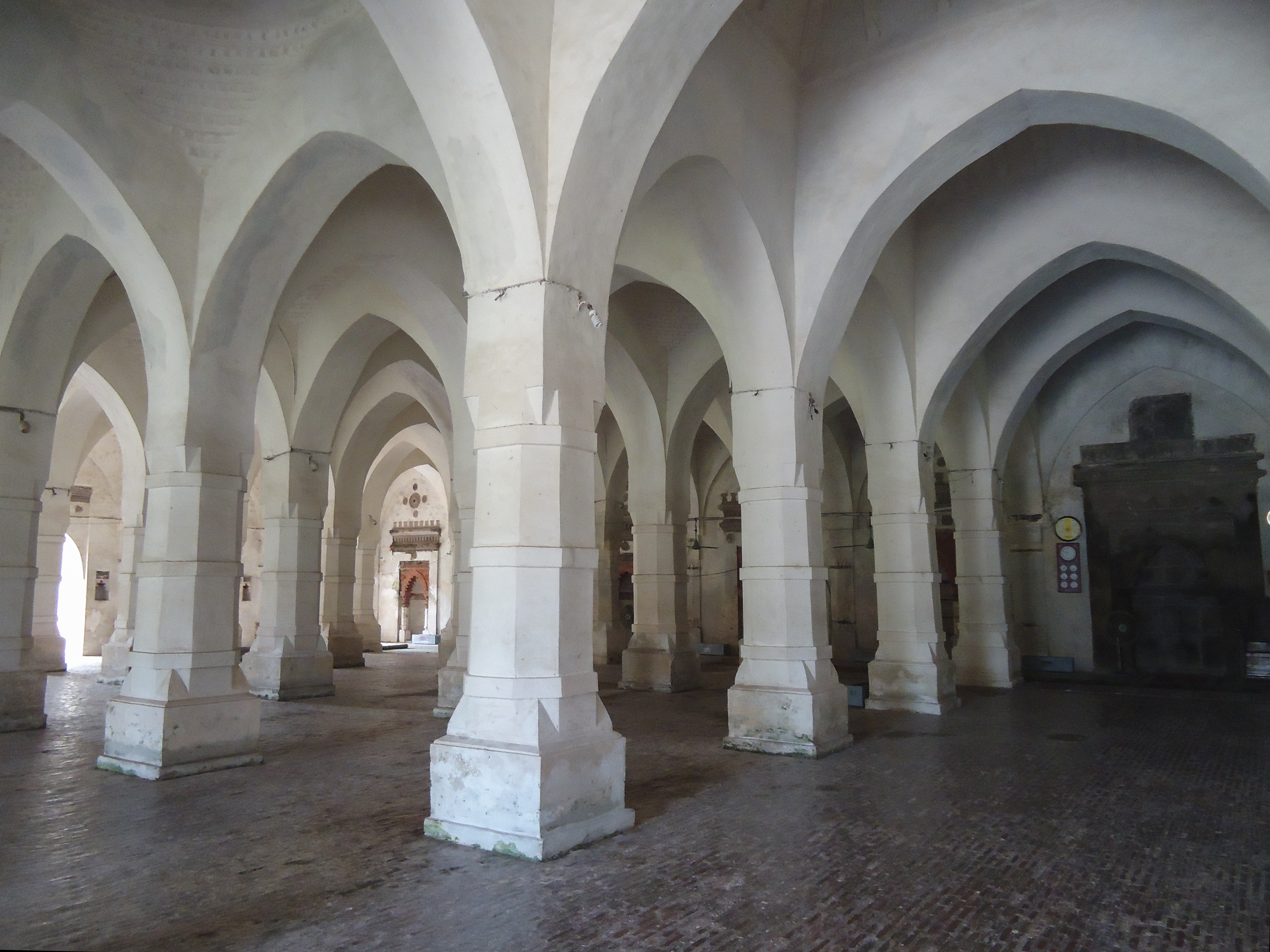
Interior of the Shat Gambuj Mosque

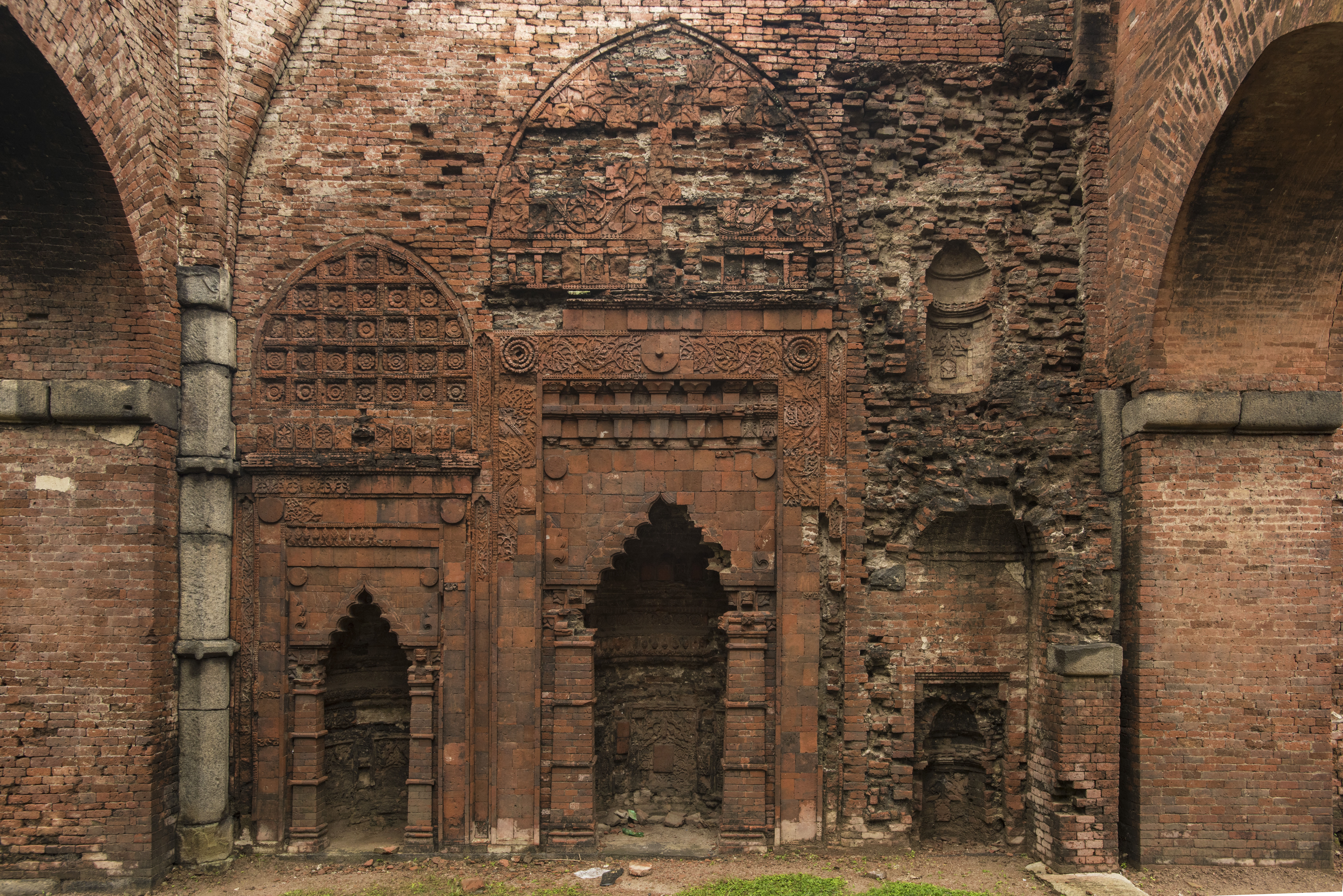
Ruined mihrabs and arabesque inside Darasbari Mosque, 15th-century

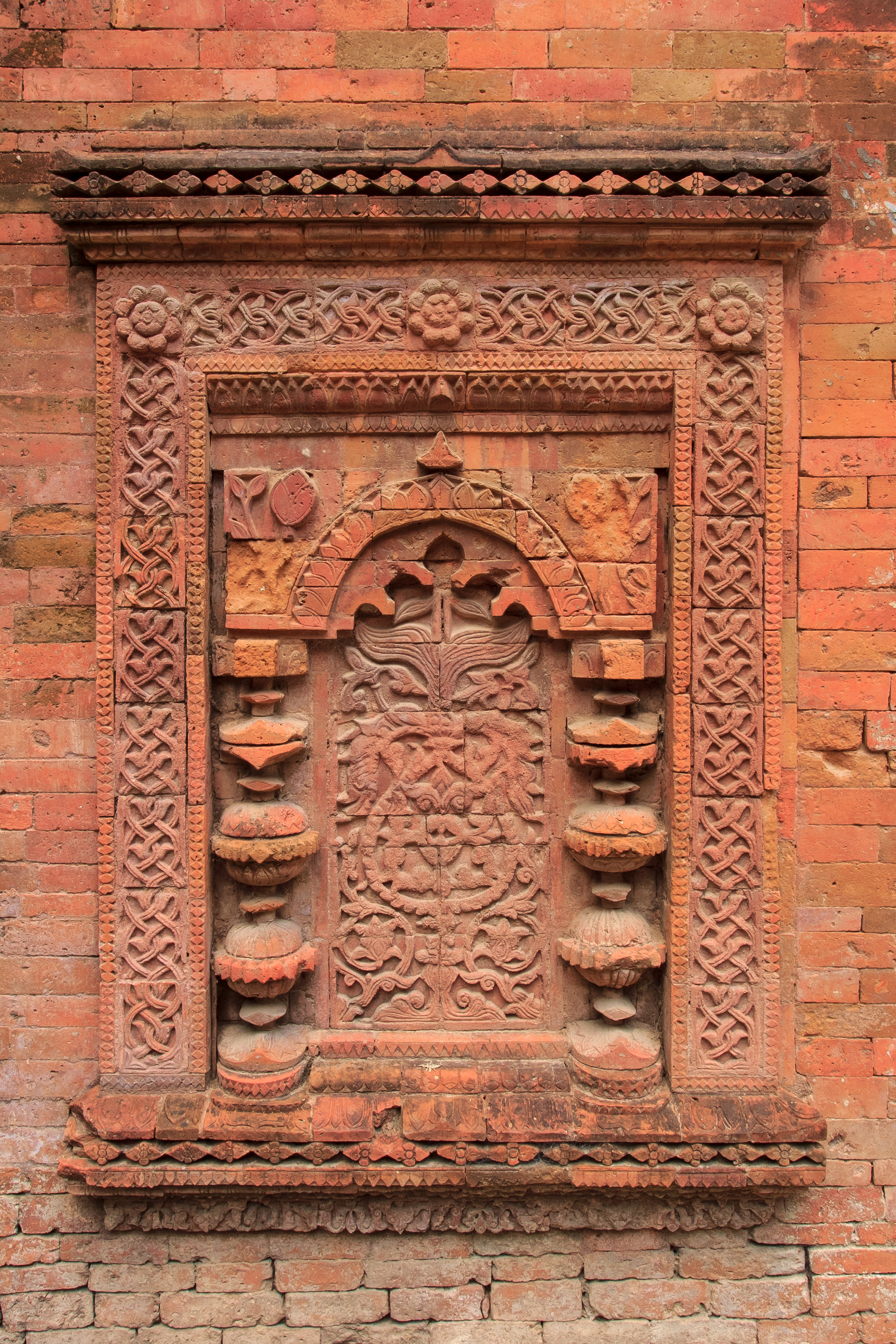
Terracotta arabesque on the wall of Khania Dighi Mosque, Gauda, 15th-century

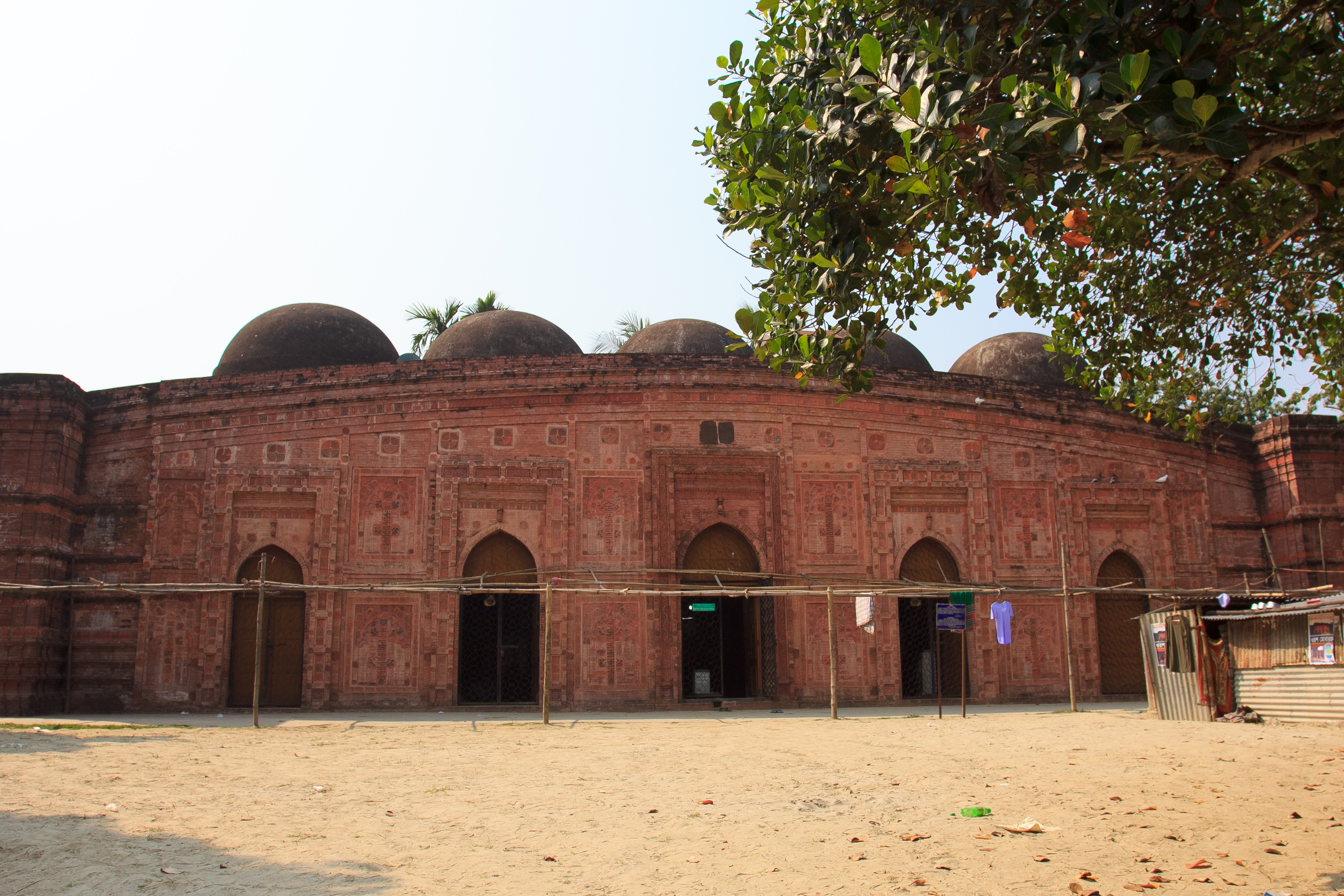
Multi-domed Pathrail Mosque, 15th-century

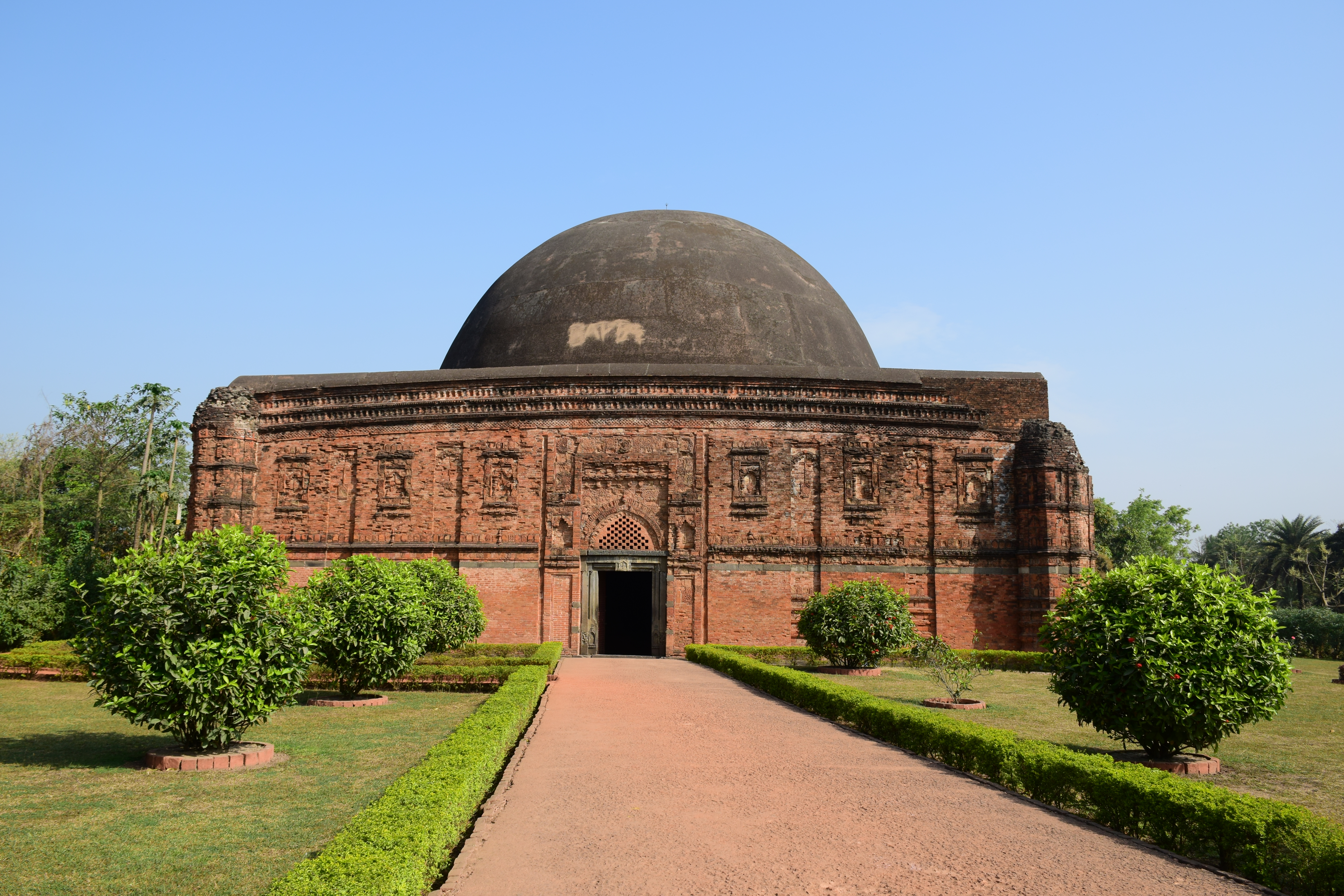
Single-domed Eklakhi Mausoleum, early 15th-century

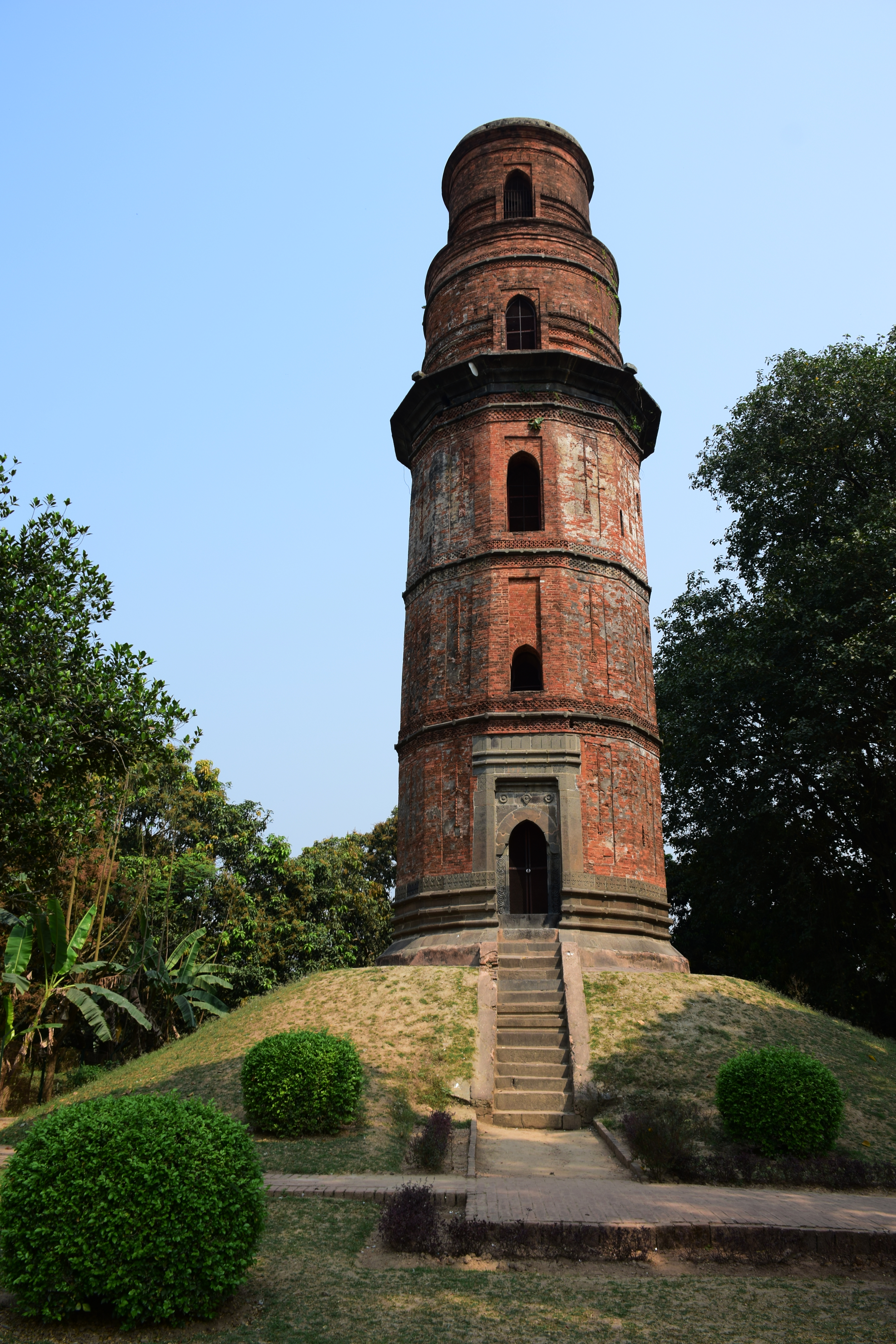
Firoz Minar, Gauda, 1480s

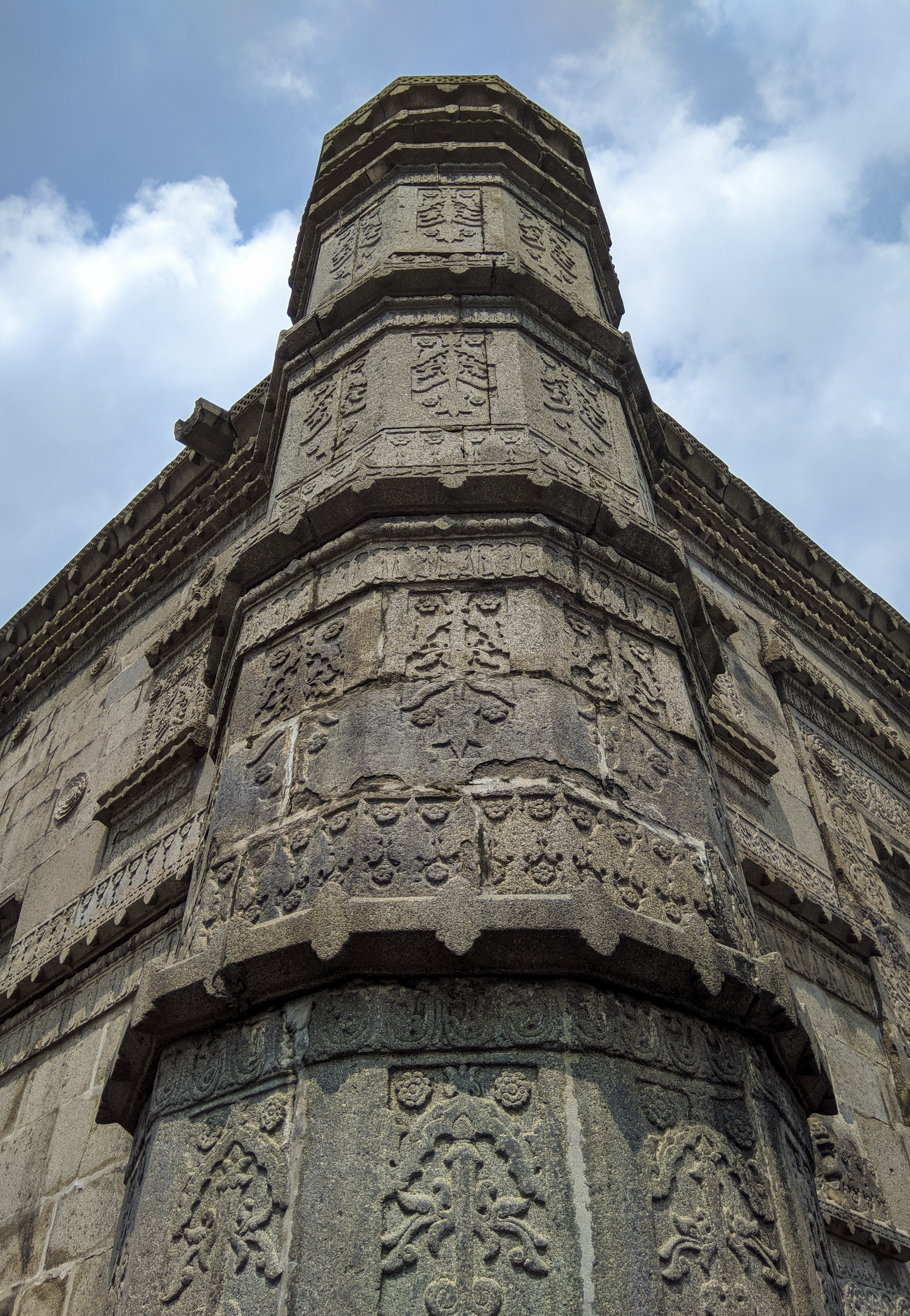
Corner tower with arabesque on Choto Sona Mosque, late 15th and early 16th centuries

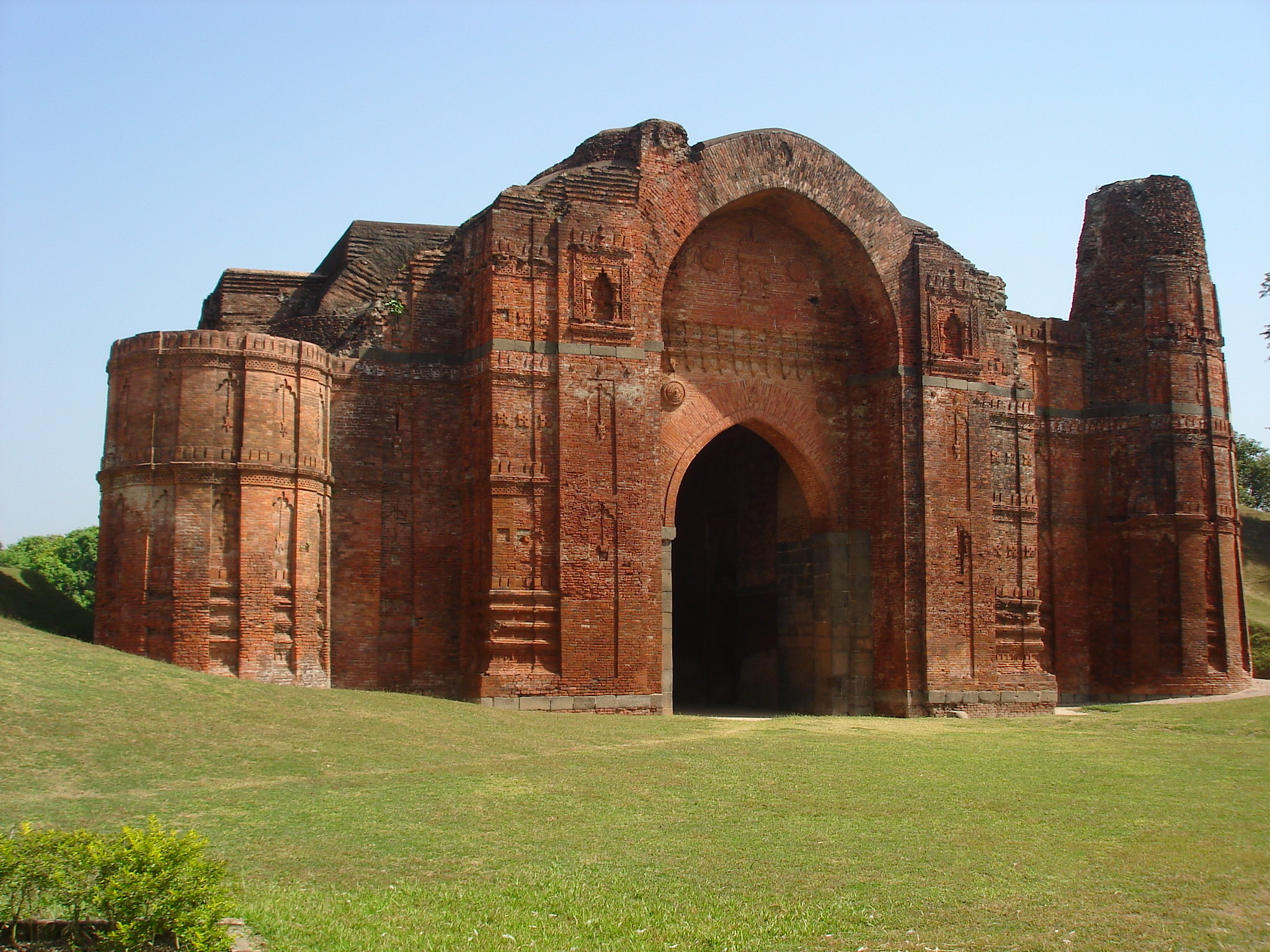
Dakhil Doorway, Gauda, 16th-century

=== Indo-Islamic architecture of Gujarat ===
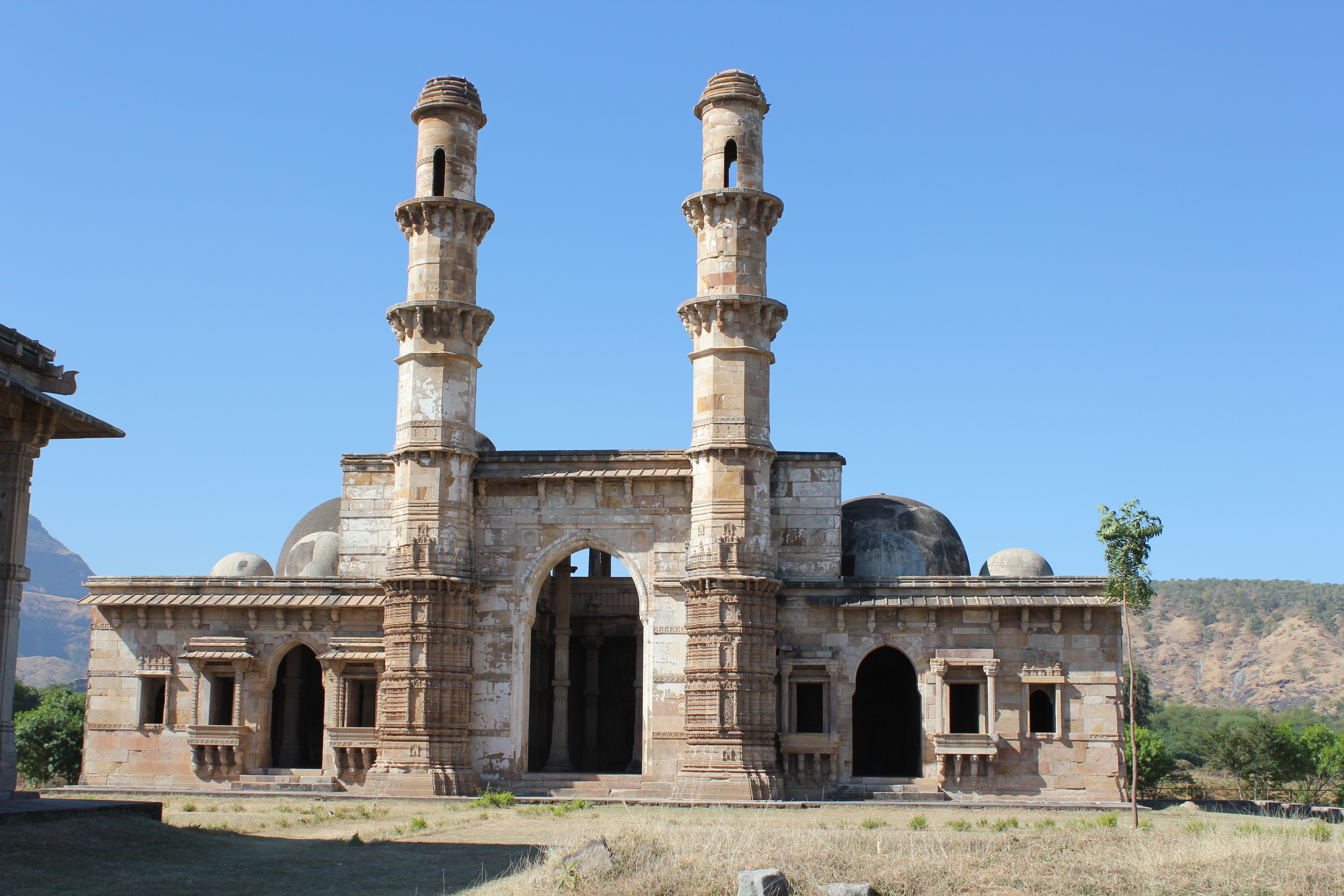
Kevada Mosque, Champaner

The distinctive Indo-Islamic architecture style of Gujarat drew micro-architectural elements from earlier Maru-Gurjara architecture and employed them in mihrab, roofs, doors, minarets and facades. In the 15th century, the Indo-Islamic style of Gujarat is especially notable for its inventive and elegant use of minarets. They are often in pairs flanking the main entrance, mostly rather thin and with elaborate carving at least at the lower levels. Some designs push out balconies at intervals up the shaft; the most extreme version of this was in the lost upper parts of the so-called "shaking minarets" at the Jama Mosque, Ahmedabad, which fell down in an earthquake in 1819. This carving draws on the traditional skills of local stone-carvers, previously exercised on Hindu temples in the Māru-Gurjara and other local styles.

Under the Gujarat Sultanate, independent between 1407 and 1543, Gujarat was a prosperous regional sultanate under the rule of the Muzaffarid dynasty, who built lavishly, particularly in the capital, Ahmedabad. The sultanate commissioned mosques such as the Jami Masjid of Ahmedabad, Jama Masjid at Champaner, Jami Masjid at Khambhat, Qutbuddin Mosque, Rani Rupamati Mosque, Sarkhej Roza, Sidi Bashir Mosque, Kevada Mosque, Sidi Sayyed Mosque, Nagina Mosque and Pattharwali Masjid, as well as structures such as Teen Darwaza, Bhadra Fort and the Dada Harir Stepwell in Ahmedabad.

The Champaner-Pavagadh Archaeological Park, the 16th century capital of Gujarat Sultanate, documents the early Islamic and pre-Mughal city that has remained without any change.

Indo-Islamic architecture style of Gujarat presages many of the architectural elements later found in Mughal architecture, including ornate mihrabs and minarets, jali (perforated screens carved in stone), and chattris (pavilions topped with cupolas).

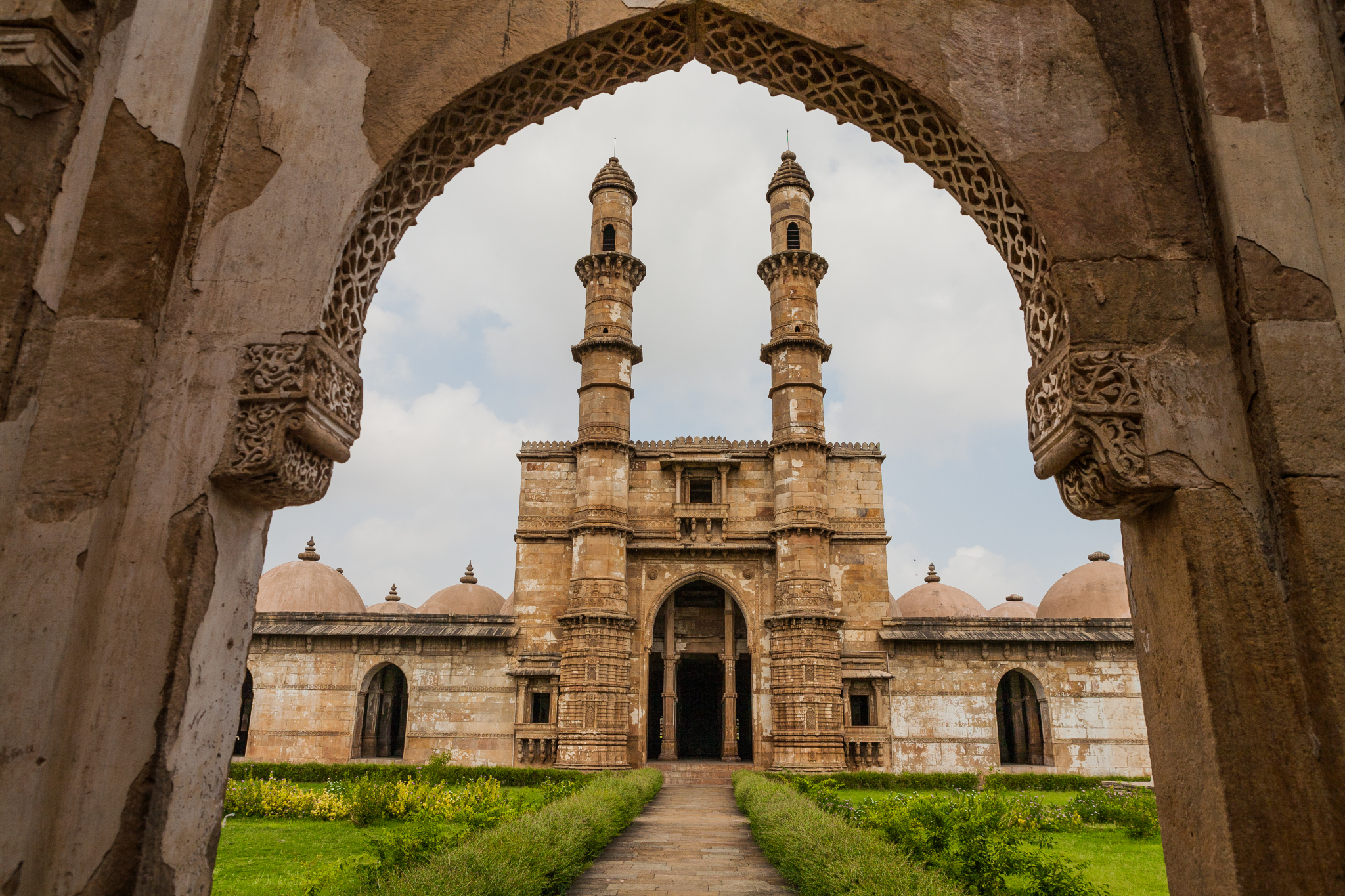
Jama Mosque, Champaner

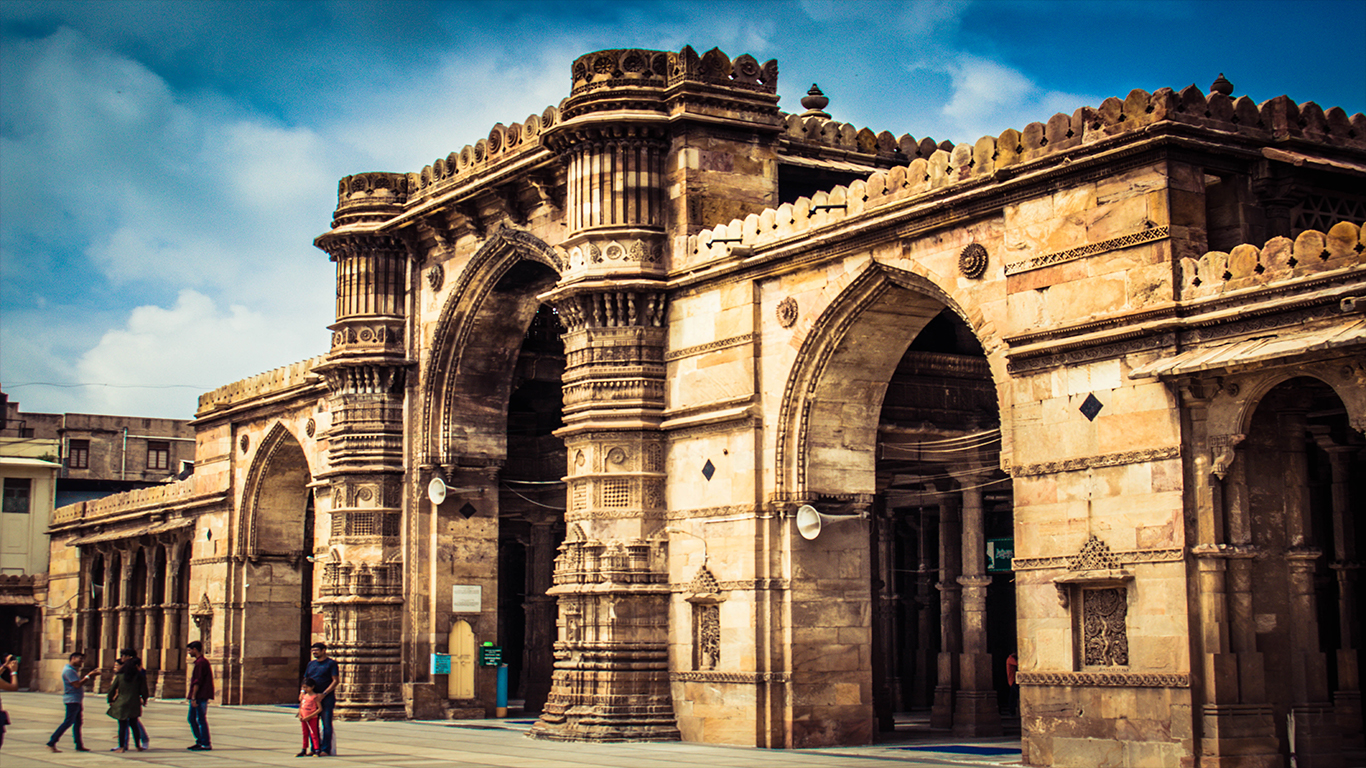
Jama Mosque, Ahmedabad (the upper parts of the minarets at the entrance now lost).

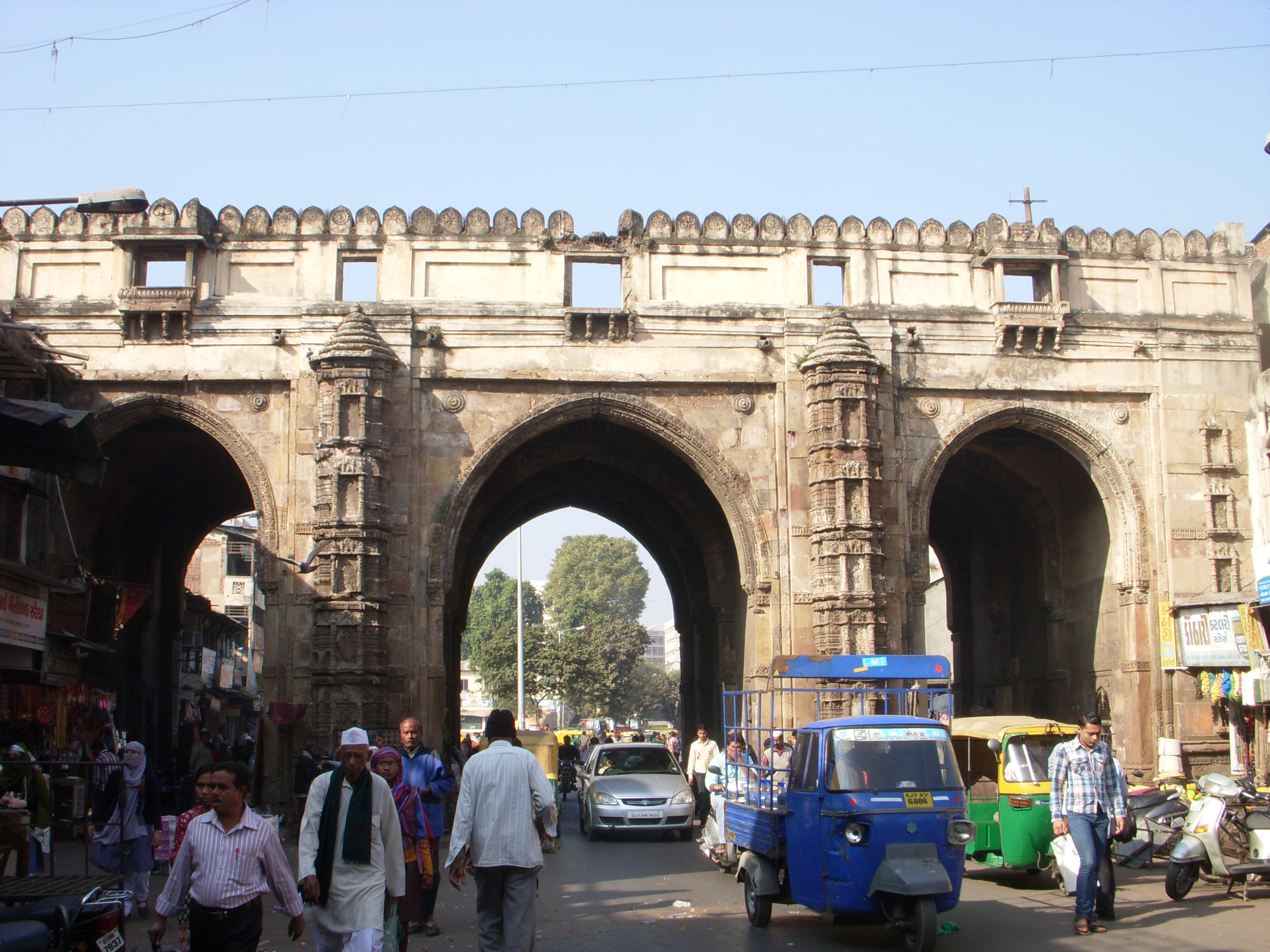
Teen Darwaza (Three-Gate) entrance to Ahmedabad

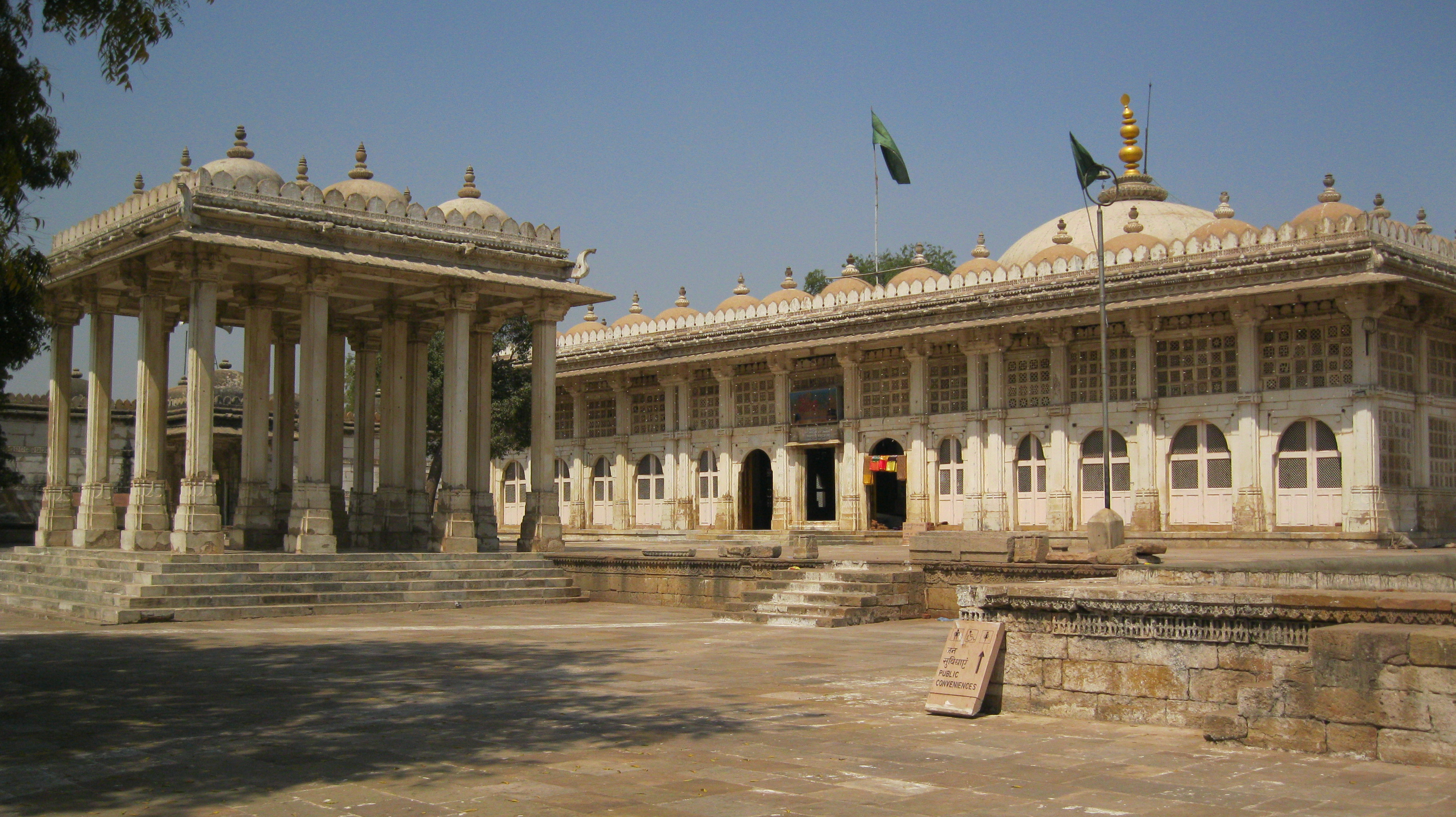
Sarkhej Roza complex, Ahmedabad

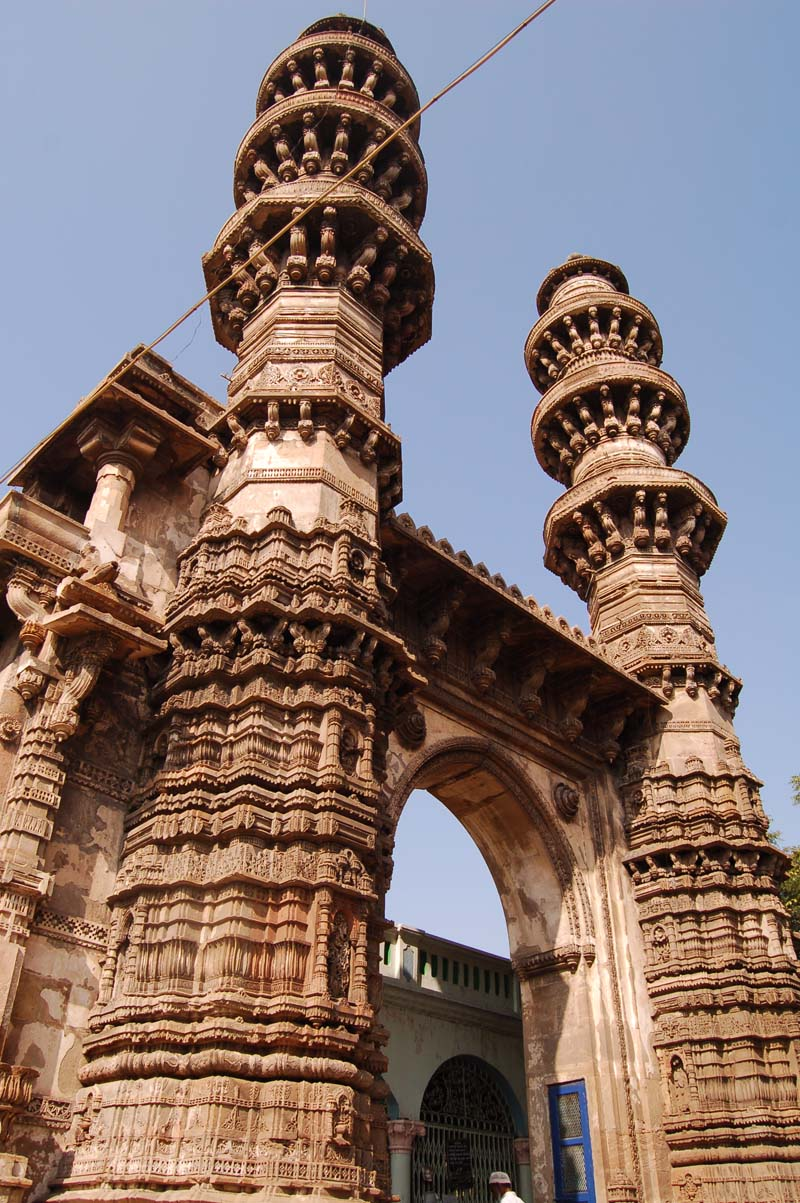
Sidi Bashir Mosque, Ahmedabad

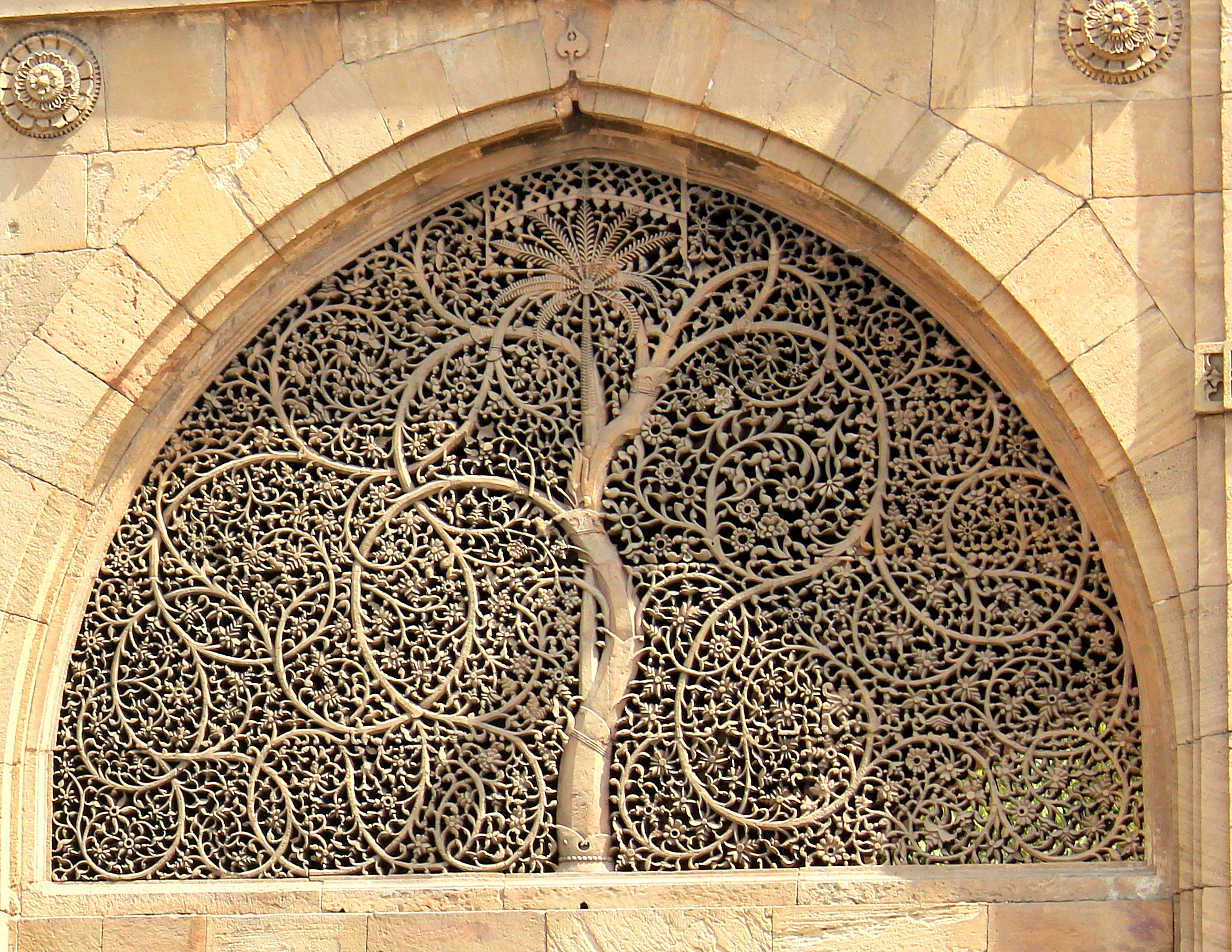
Jali at the Sidi Sayyid Mosque

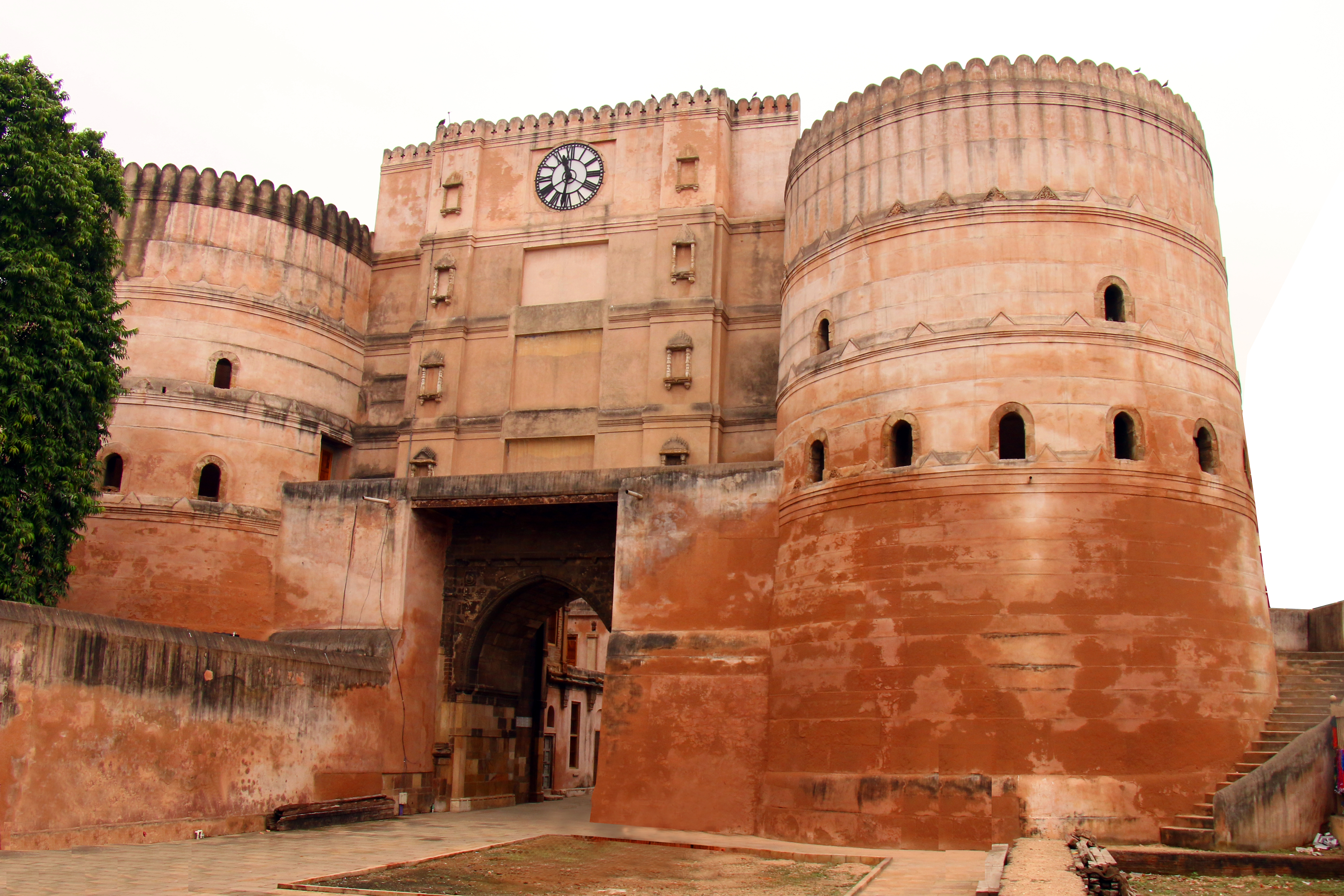
Bhadra Fort, Ahmedabad

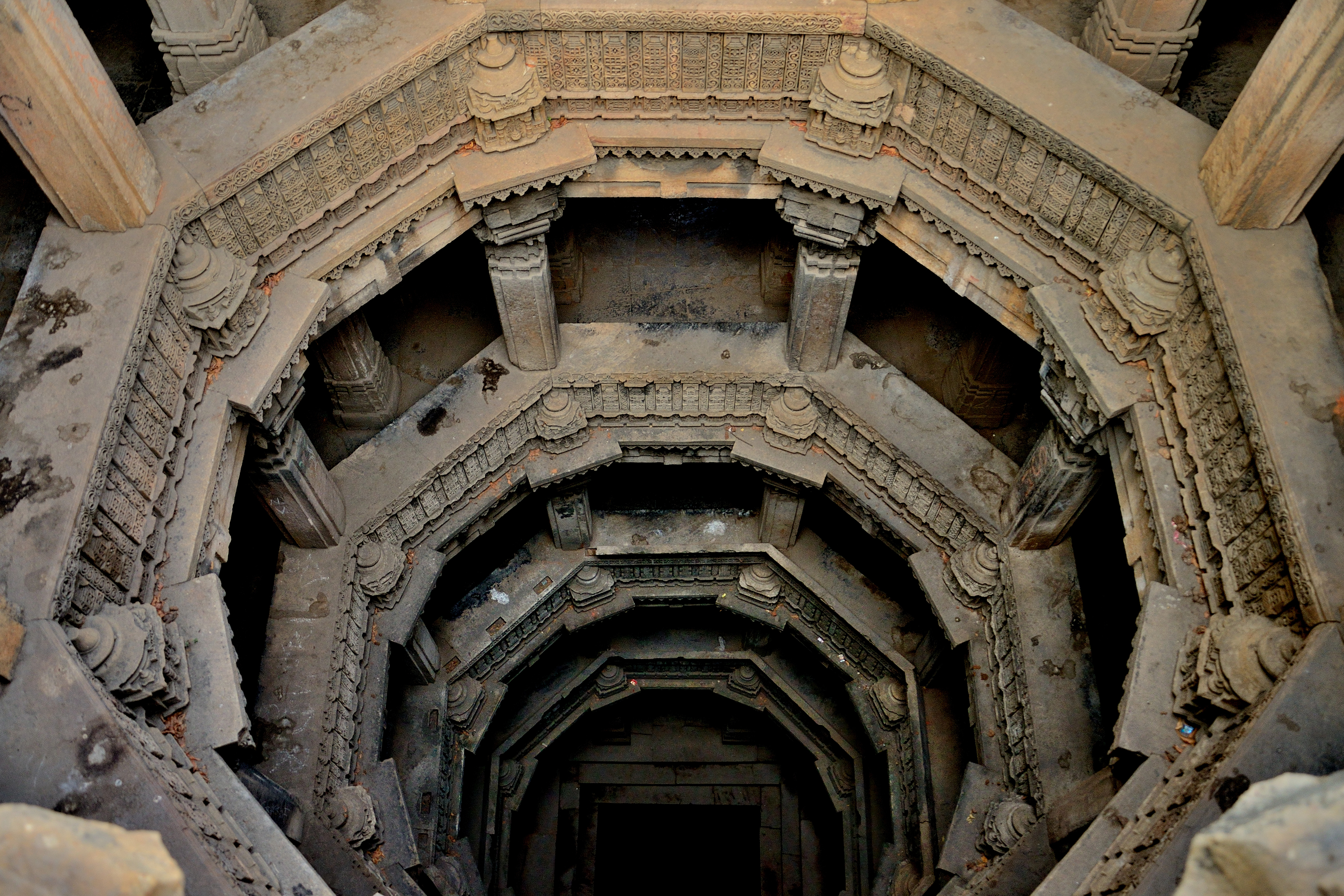
Dada Harir Stepwell, Ahmedabad

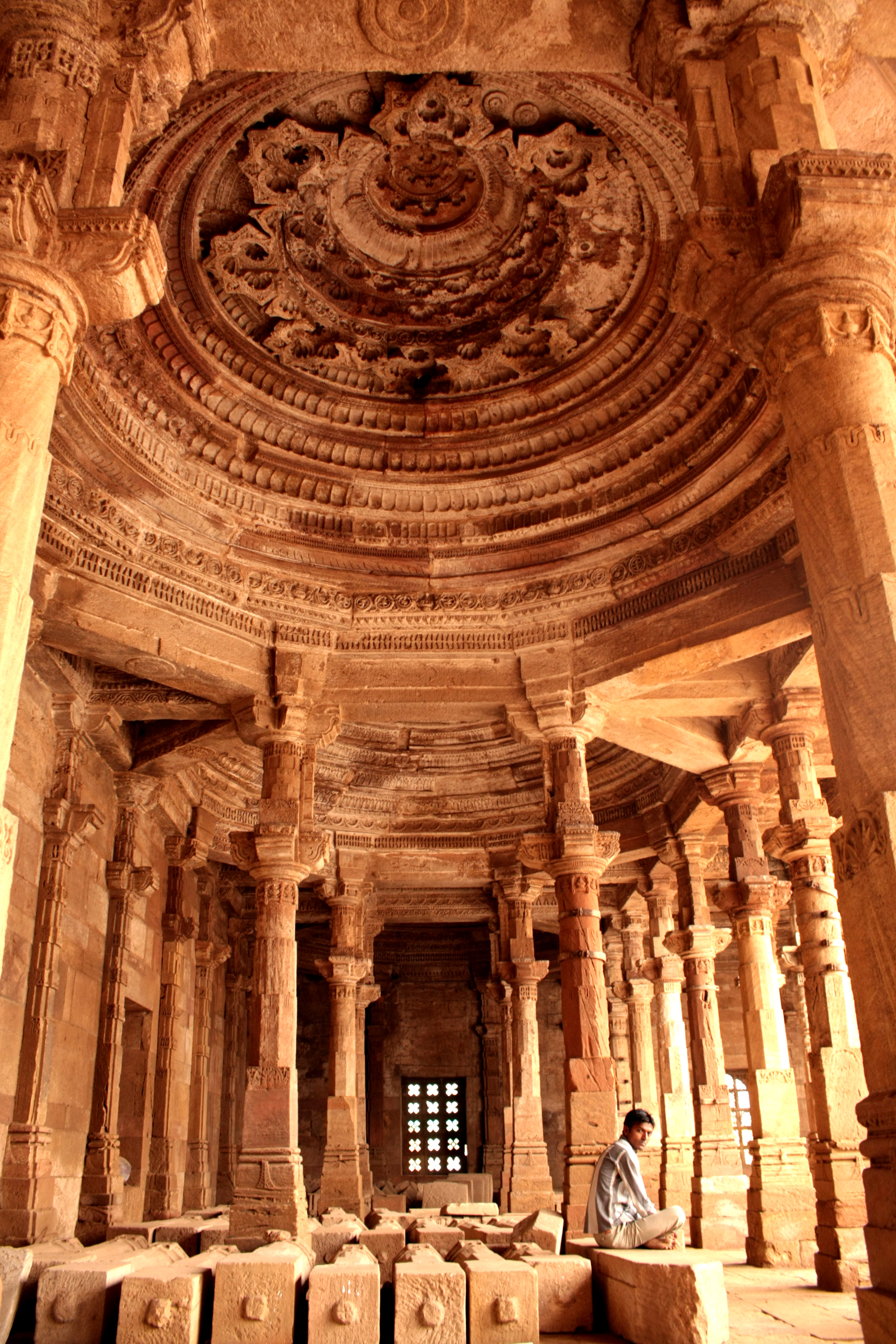
Interior of Jami Mosque, Khambhat

=== Kashmir ===
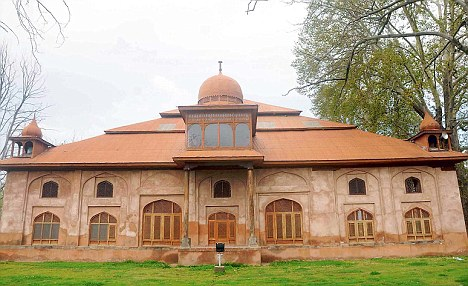
Aali Masjid in Srinagar, Kashmir.

By 1339, Shams-ud-din Shah Mir of the Shah Mir dynasty established a sultanate encompassing the region of Kashmir (consisting of modern-day Gilgit-Baltistan, Azad Kashmir, Jammu and Kashmir, Ladakh, and Aksai Chin), allowing for the gradual Islamization of the region and the hybridization of Persianate culture and architecture with the indigenous Buddhist styles of Kashmir.

In the capital at Srinagar in modern Indian-administered Kashmir, Sikandar Shah Mir (died 1413) constructed the Jamia Masjid, a large wooden congregational mosque that incorporates elements of Buddhist pagoda structure, as well as the wooden Khanqah-e-Moulah mosque. Also in Srinagar are the Aali Masjid and the Tomb of Zain-ul-Abidin. Two 14th-century wooden mosques in Gilgit-Baltistan are the Chaqchan Mosque in Khaplu (1370) and the Amburiq Mosque in Shigar. Both have stone-built cores with elaborately carved wooden exterior galleries, at Amburiq on two levels, in an adaptation of traditional local styles.

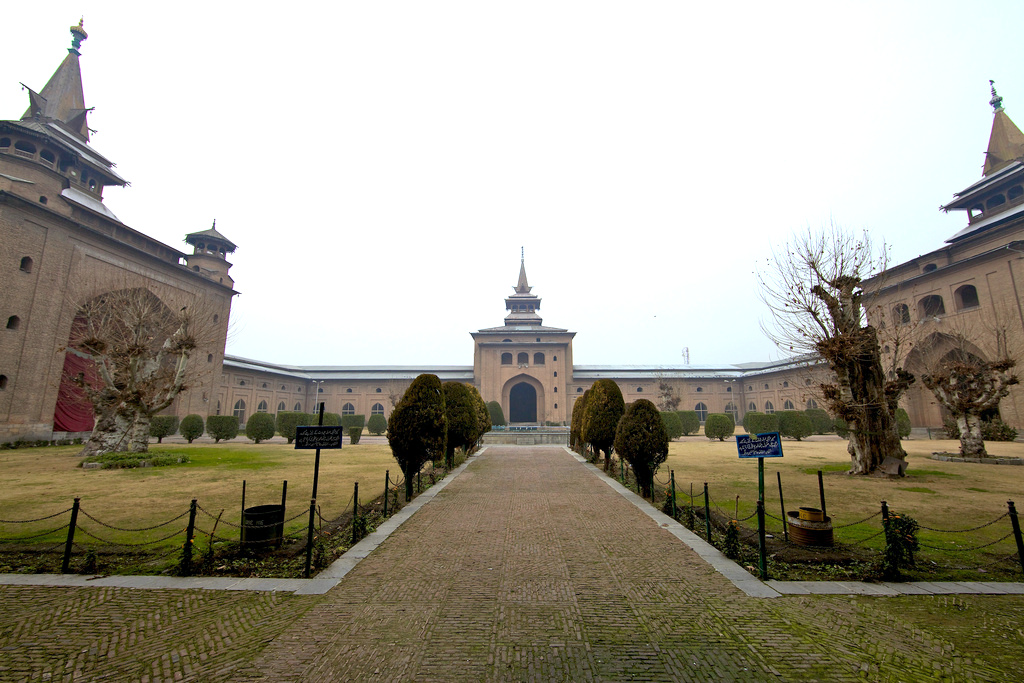
Jamia Masjid in Srinagar, Kashmir

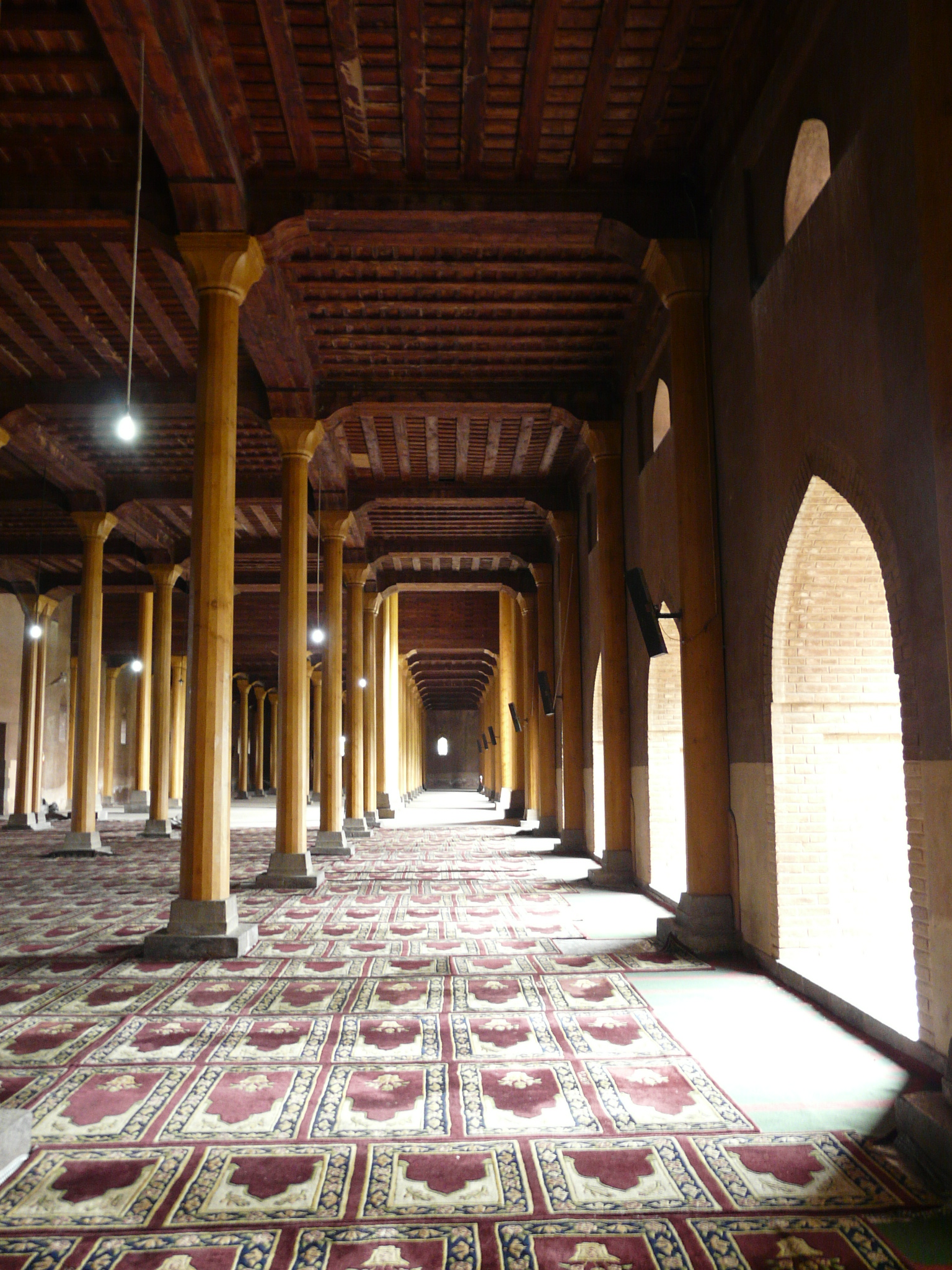
Interior of the Jamia Masjid

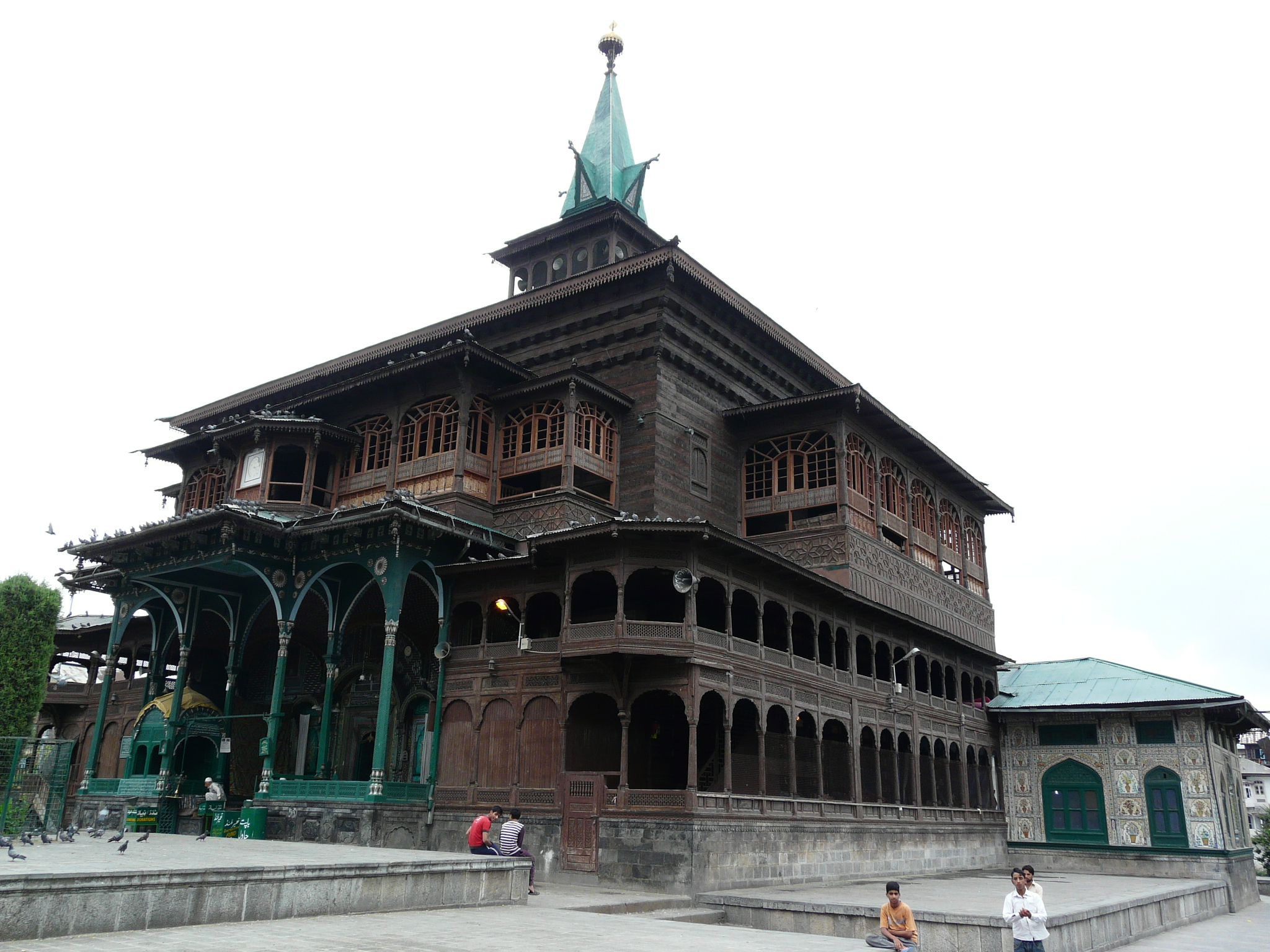
Khanqah-e-Moula in Srinagar, Kashmir

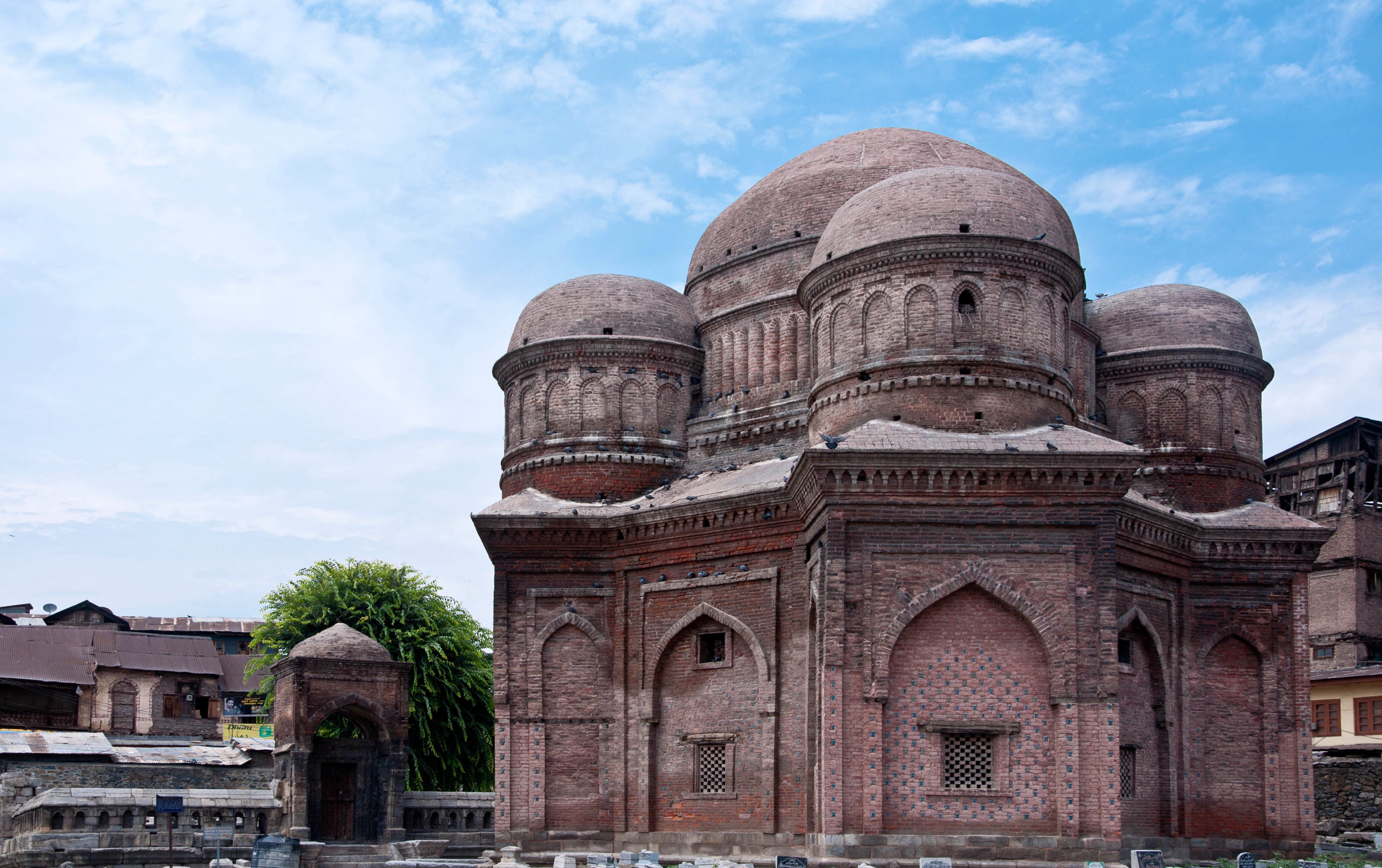
Tomb of Zain-ul-Abedin's mother in Srinagar, Kashmir

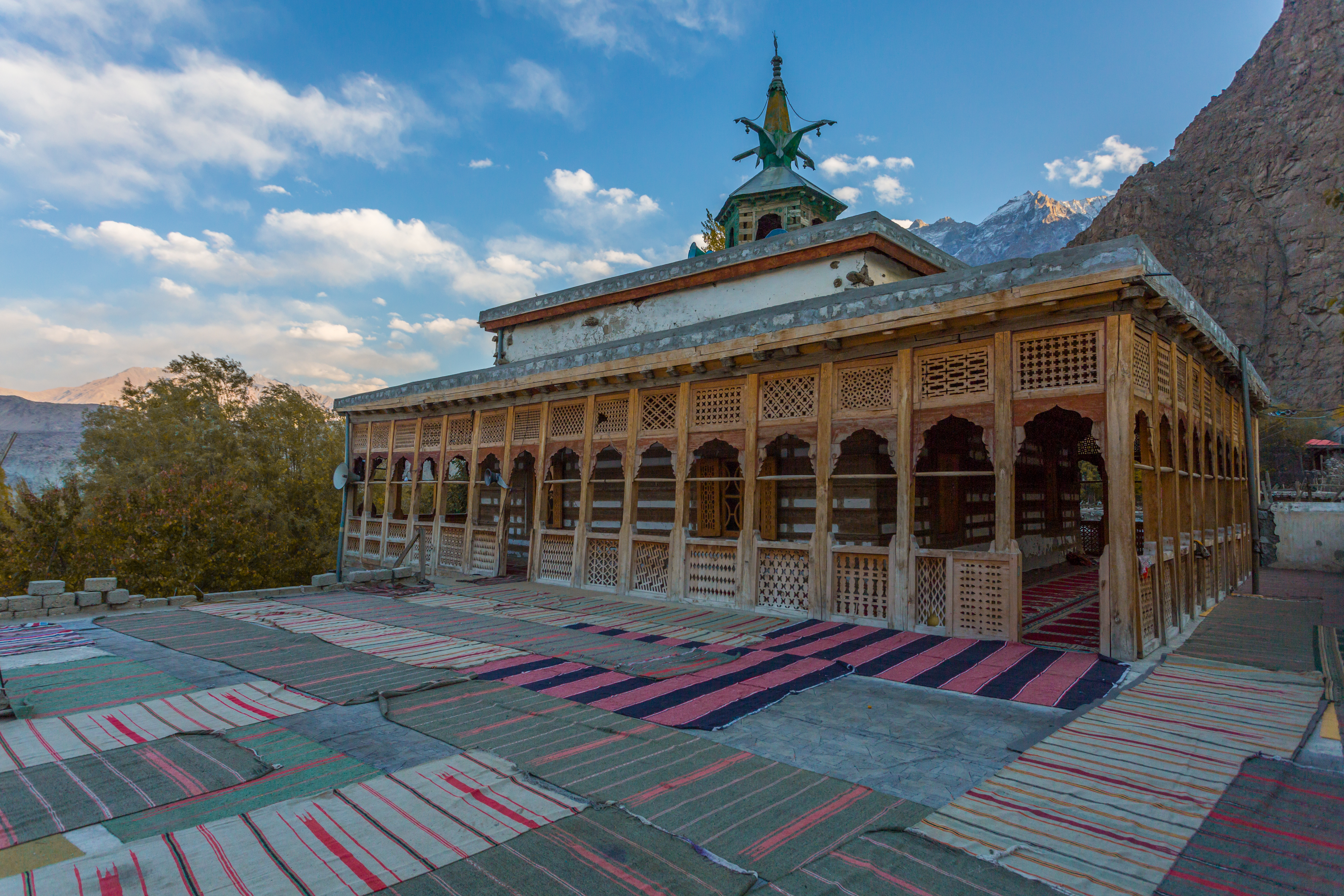
Chaqchan Mosque in Khaplu, Gilgit-Baltistan

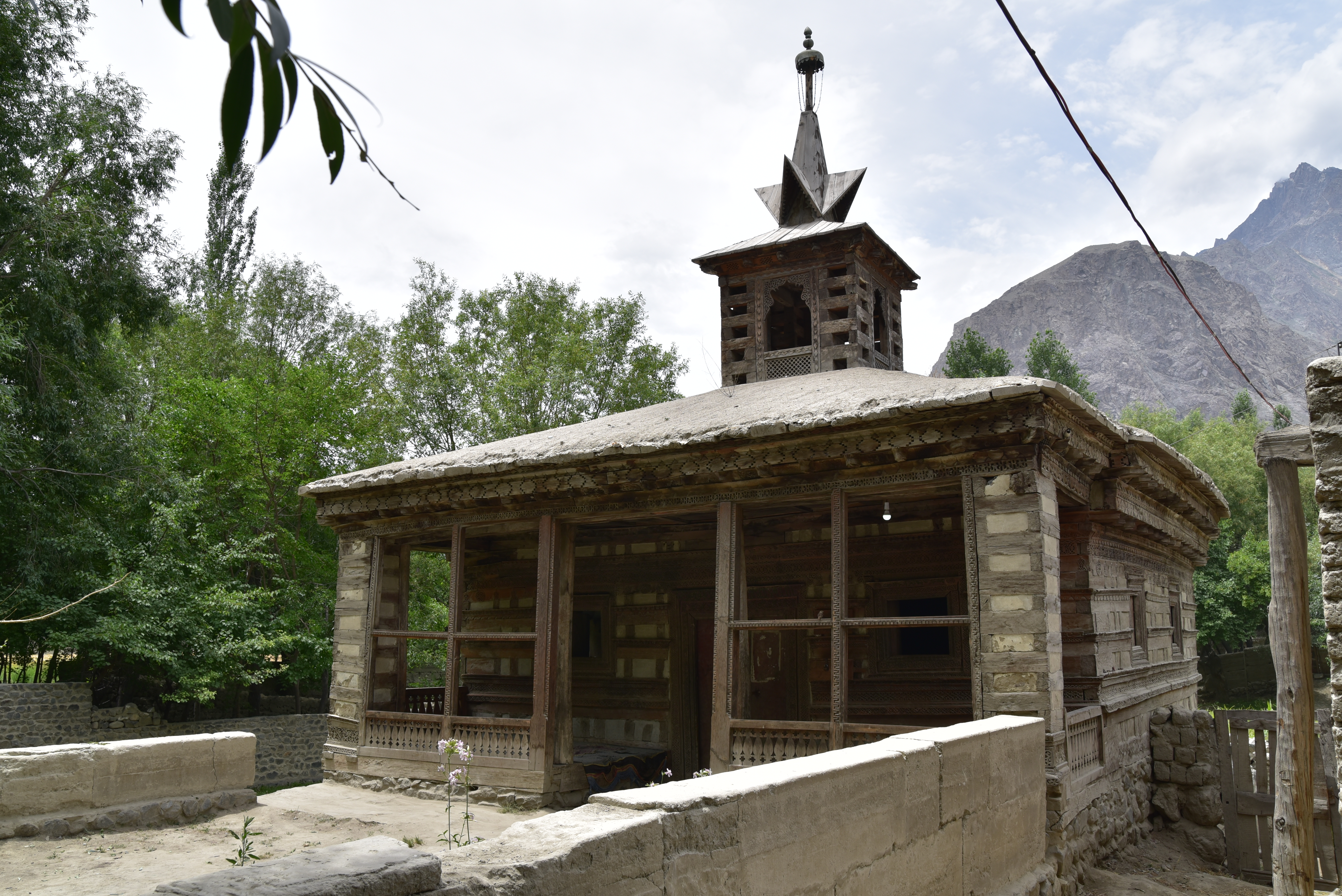
Amburiq Mosque in Gilgit-Baltistan

== Mughal architecture ==
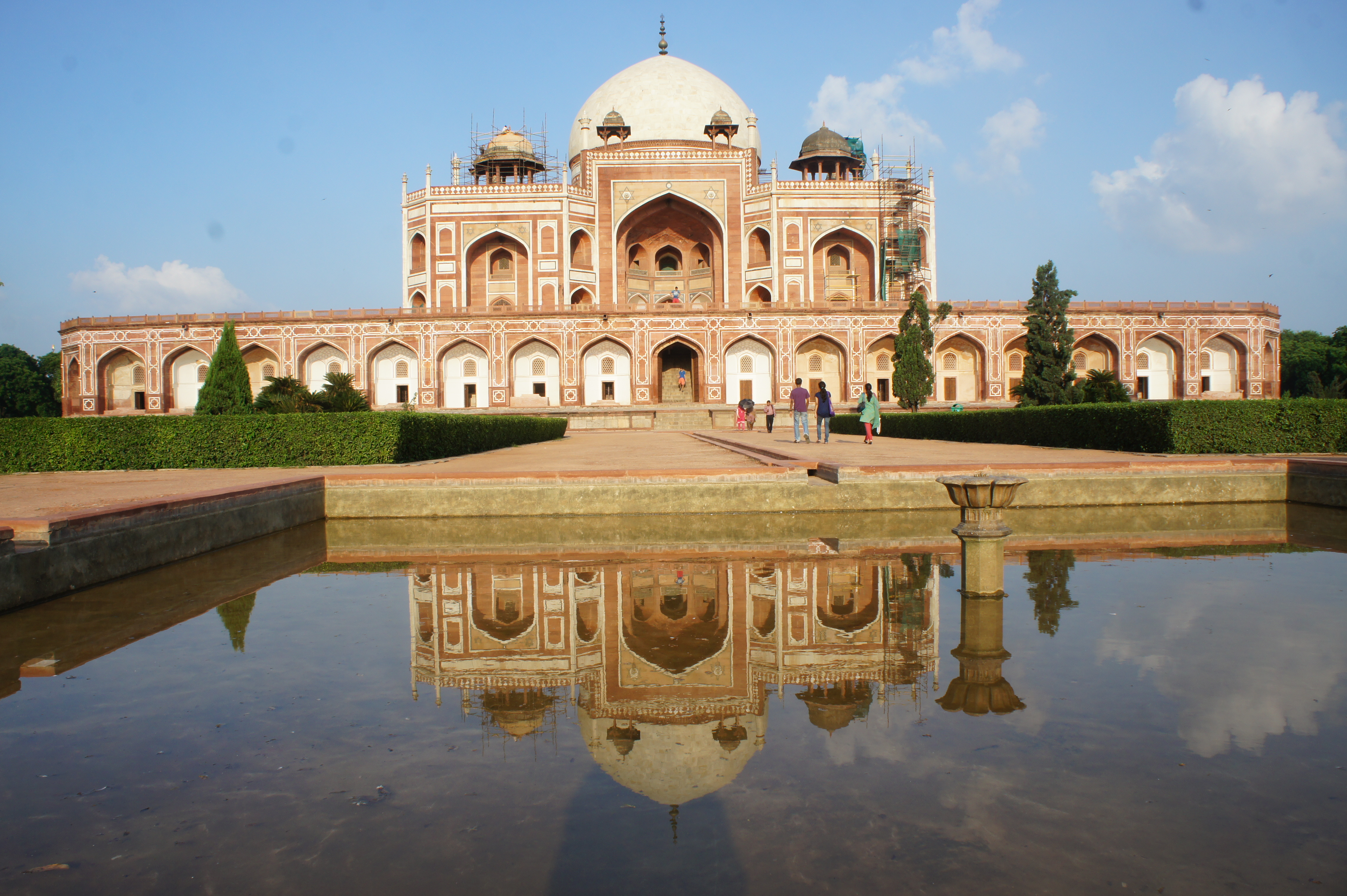
Humayun's Tomb, Delhi, the first fully developed Mughal imperial tomb, 1569-70

The Mughal Empire, an Islamic empire that lasted in India from 1526 to 1857 left a mark on Indian architecture that was a mix of Islamic, Persian, Arabic, Central Asian and native Indian architecture. A major aspect of Mughal architecture is the symmetrical nature of buildings and courtyards. Akbar, who ruled in the 16th century, made major contributions to Mughal architecture. He systematically designed forts and towns in similar symmetrical styles that blended Indian styles with outside influences. The gate of a fort Akbar designed at Agra exhibits the Assyrian gryphon, Indian elephants, and birds.

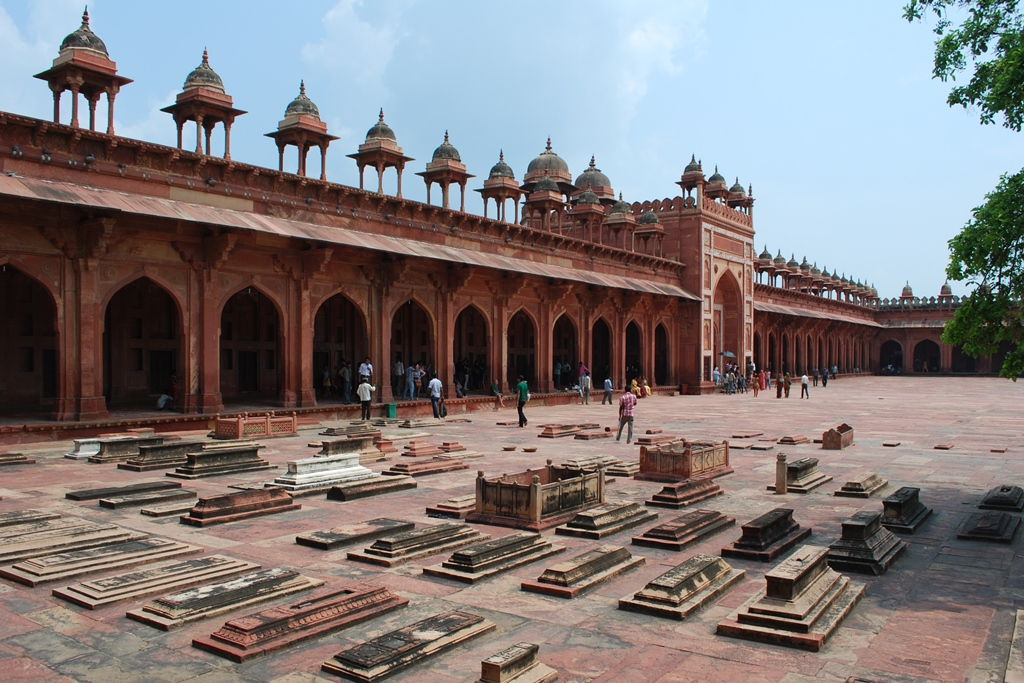
King's Gate at Fatehpur Sikri, near Agra

During the Mughal era design elements of Islamic-Persian architecture were fused with and often produced playful forms of the Hindustani art. Delhi, Agra, Fatehpur Sikri, and Lahore, residences of Mughal rulers, exhibit a multiplicity of important buildings from the empire, among them the Humayun's tomb, Sabz Burj, Nila Gumbad, Red Fort, Akbar's tomb, Agra Fort, Ttmad Ud Daulah tomb, Musamman Burj, Taj Mahal, Jama Mosque, Tomb of Salim Chishti, Badshahi mosque, fortress of Lahore, Alamgiri Gate, and Wazir Khan Mosque, as well as numerous other mosques and mausoleums. The Shahjahan Mosque at Thatta, Sindh was built under, and probably largely by Shah Jahan, but strongly reflects Central Asian Islamic style, as the emperor had recently been campaigning near Samarkand. Singularly, the innumerable Chaukhandi tombs are of eastern influence. Although constructed between 16th and 18th centuries, they do not possess any similarity to Mughal architecture. The stonemason works show rather typical Sindhi workmanship, probably from before Islamic times. Mughal architecture was influenced by Rajasthani palace architecture, which is very much visible in the Mughal architecture.

Later Mughal architecture, built under Aurangzeb (ruled 1658–1707), include the Badshahi Mosque in Lahore and Bibi ka Maqbara in Aurangabad. By the late 18th century the style was effectively over. However, by this time versions of Mughal style, often called "post-Mughal", had been widely adopted by the rulers of the princely states and other wealthy people of all religions for their palaces and, where appropriate, tombs. Hindu patrons often mixed aspects of Hindu temple architecture and traditional Hindu palace architecture with Mughal elements and, later, European ones.

Major examples of Indo Islamic architecture include:

- Tombs: Taj Mahal, Akbar's Tomb, Bibi ka Maqbara, Safdarjung Tomb and Humayun's Tomb
- Forts: Red Fort, Lahore Fort, Agra Fort and Idrakpur Fort
- Mosques: Jama Masjid of Delhi, Badshahi Masjid and Moti Masjid
- Gardens: Shalimar Gardens, Bagh-e-Babur and Verinag Garden
- Caravansaries: Akbari Sarai and Bara Katra
- Bridges: Shahi Bridge, Mughal Bridge, Athpullah and Barapullah
- Milemarkers: Kos Minar
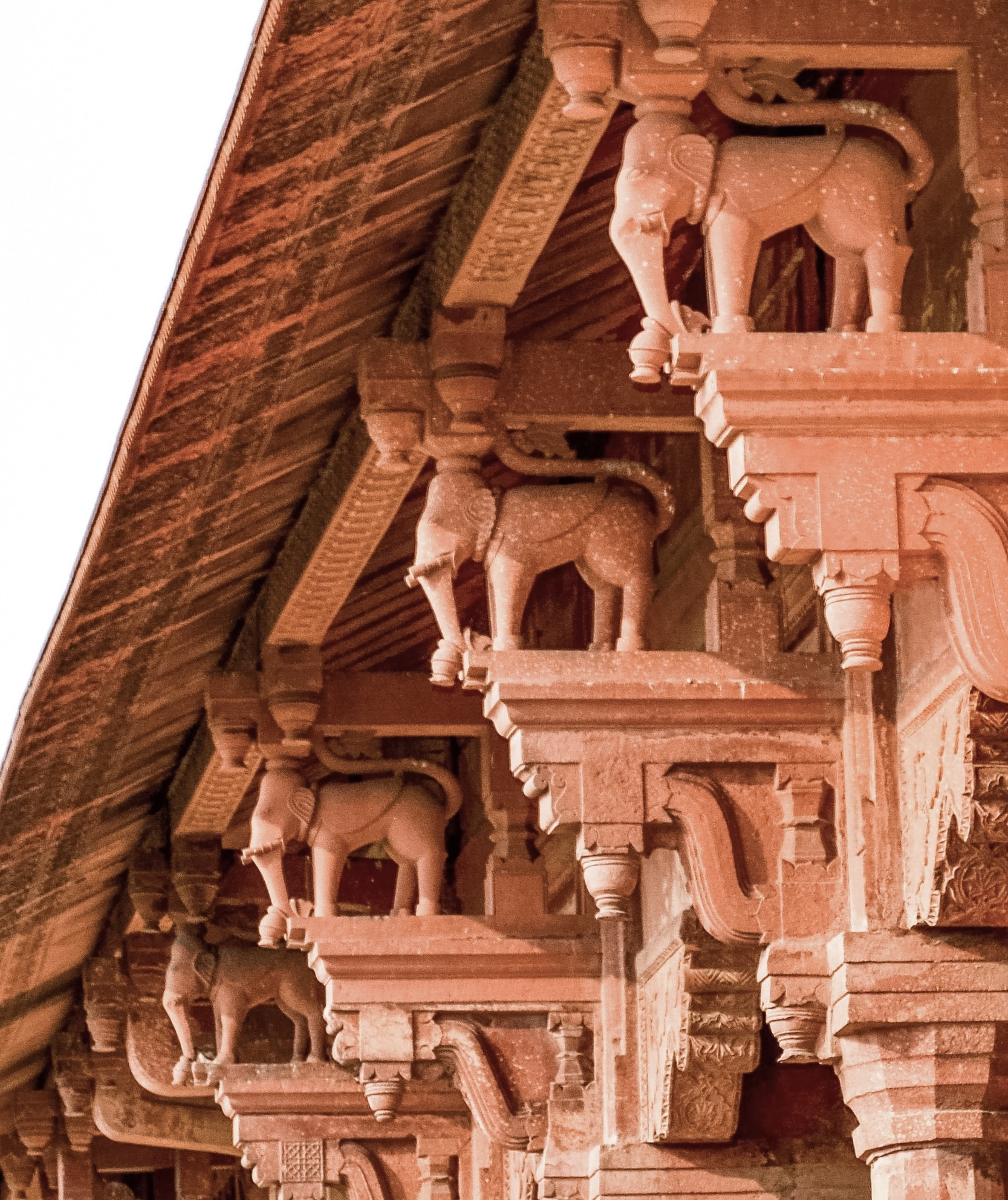
The use of elephant-shaped column brackets in buildings of the Lahore Fort reflects Hindu influences on Mughal Architecture during the reign of Akbar.

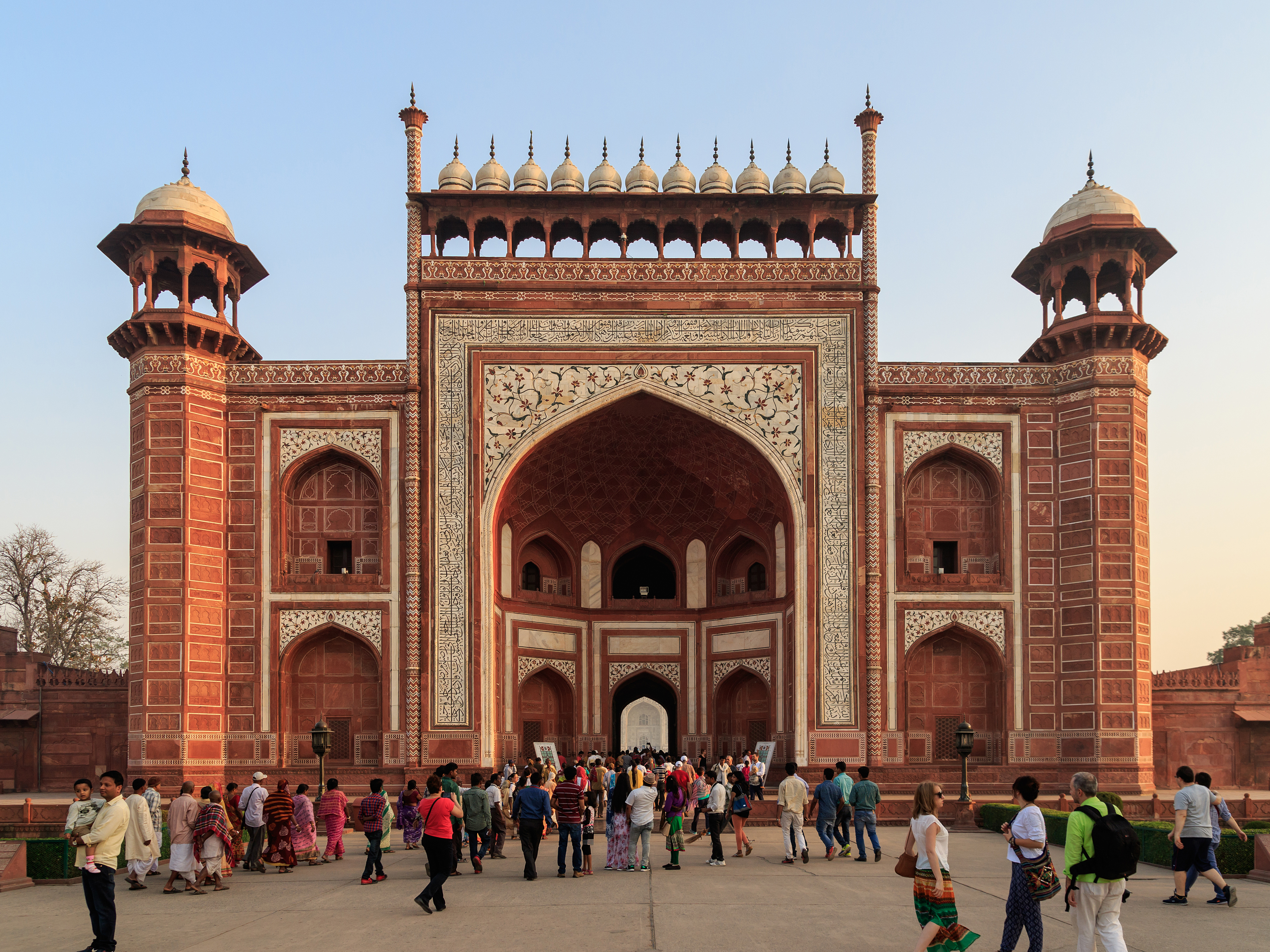
The Darwaza-i-Rauza (Great Gate) of the Taj Mahal.

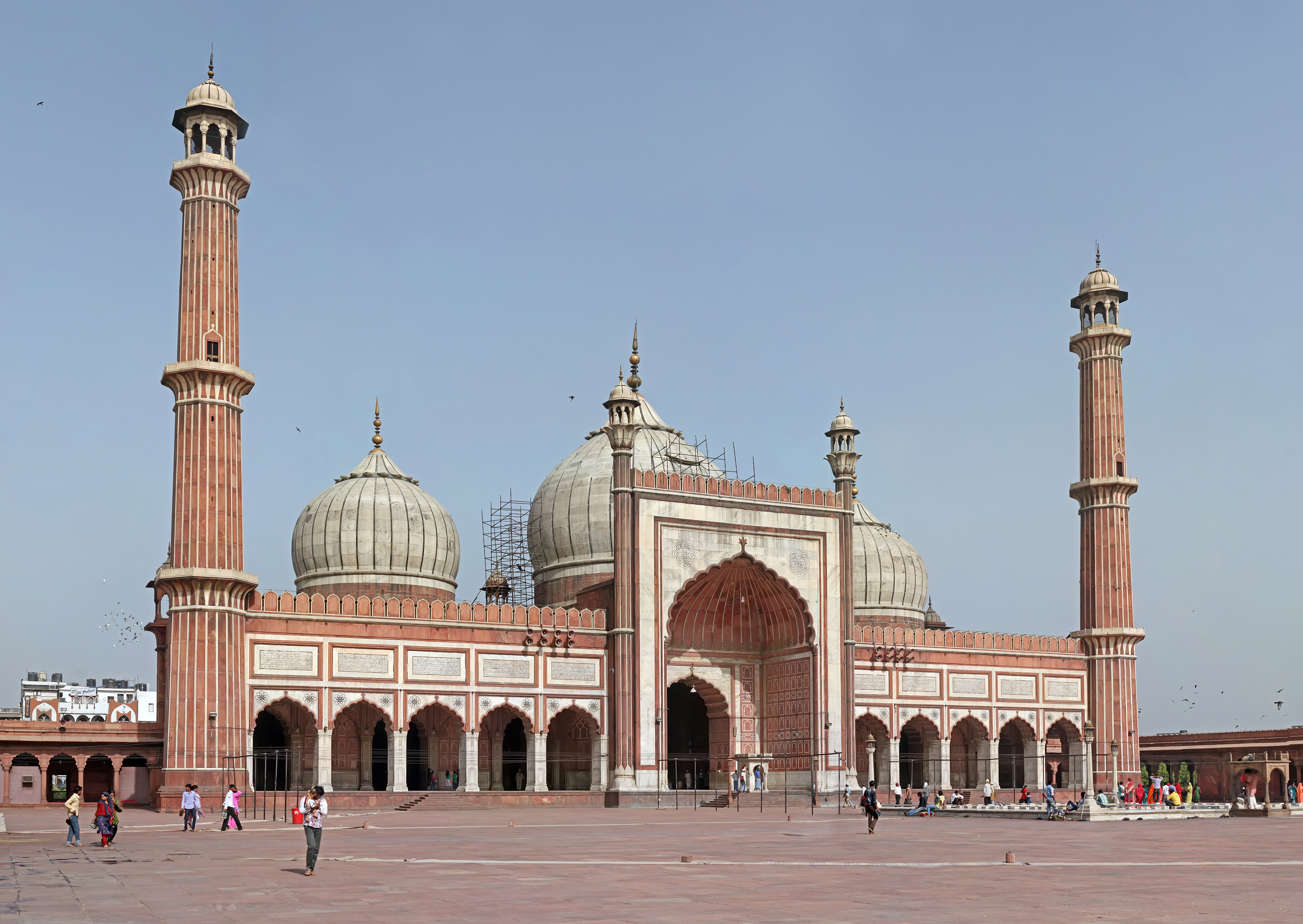
Jama Masjid, Delhi, one of the largest mosques in India.

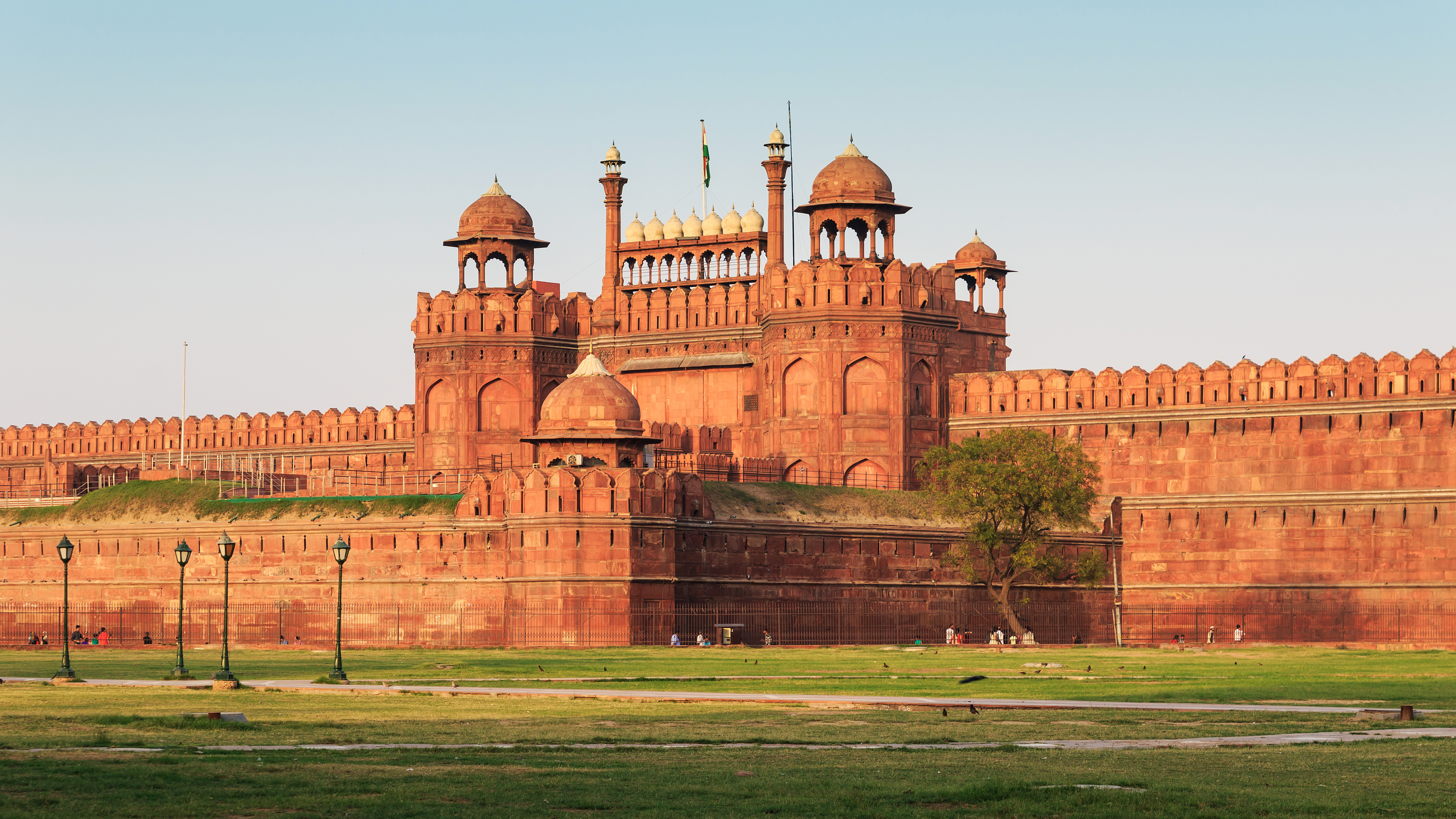
Lahori Gate of the Red Fort, Delhi, India.

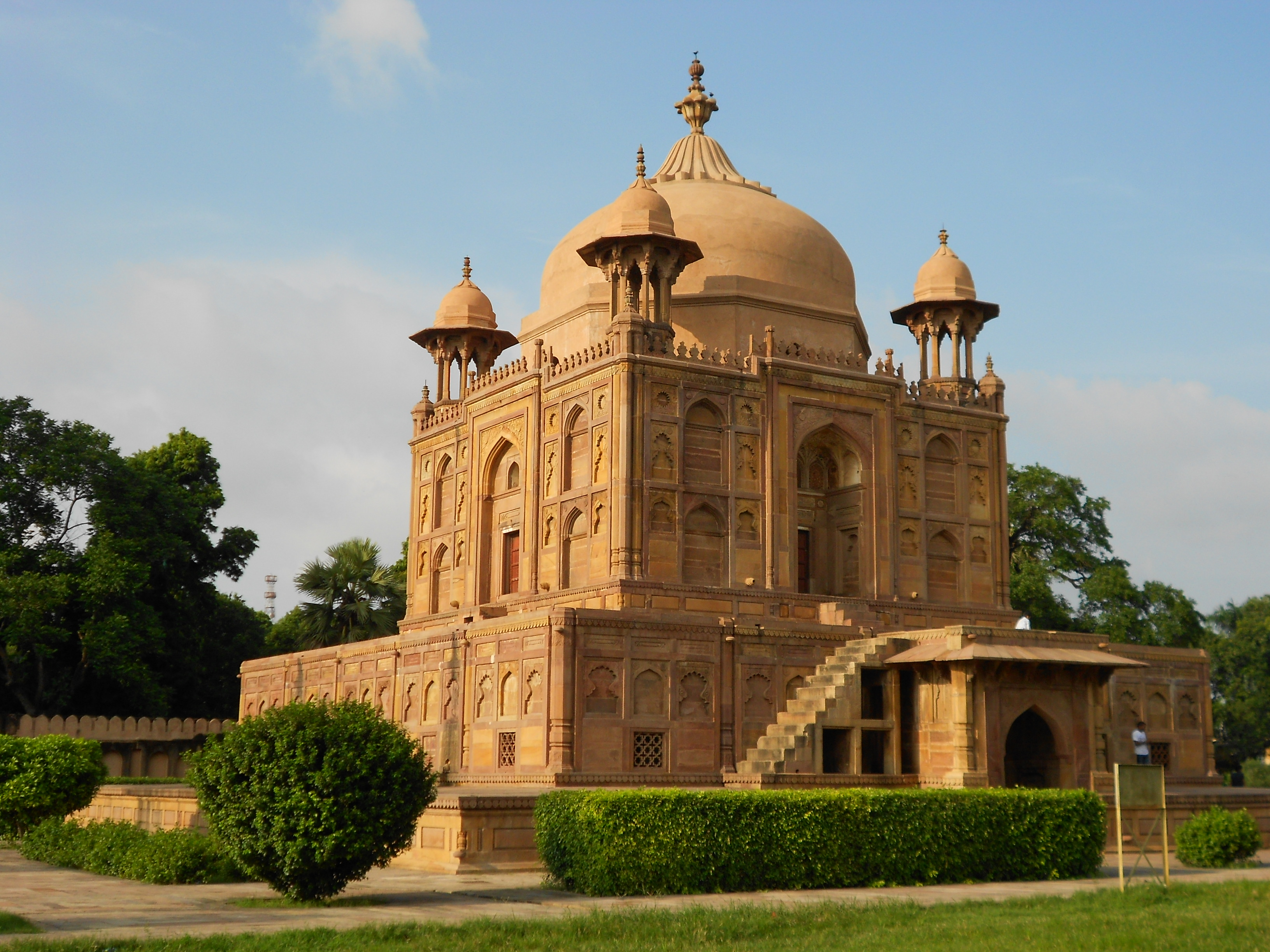
Tomb of Nithar Begum at Khusro Bagh, Allahabad, India.

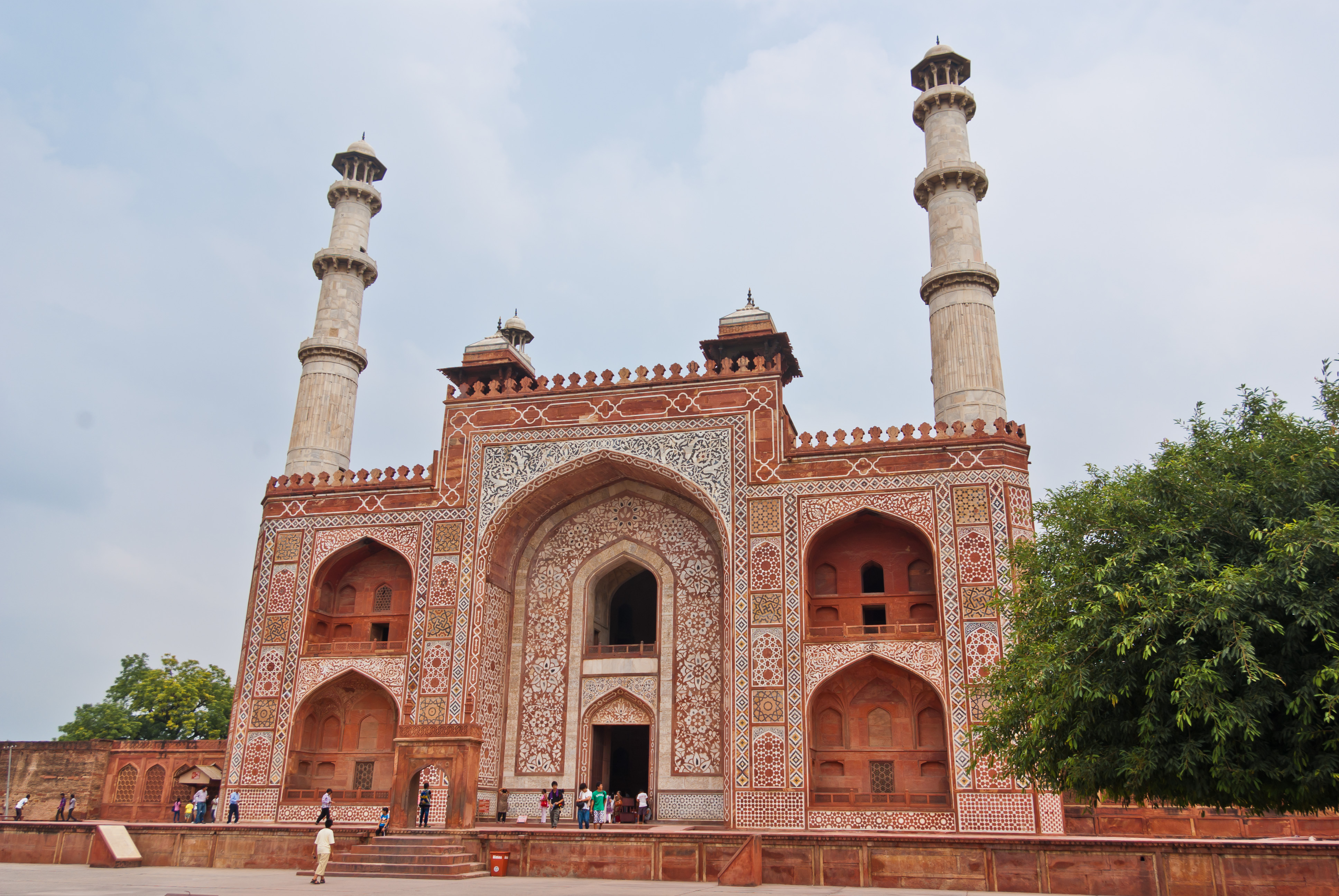
Akbar's Tomb at Agra, uses red sandstone and white marble, like many of the Mughal monuments. The Taj Mahal is a notable exception, as it uses only marble.

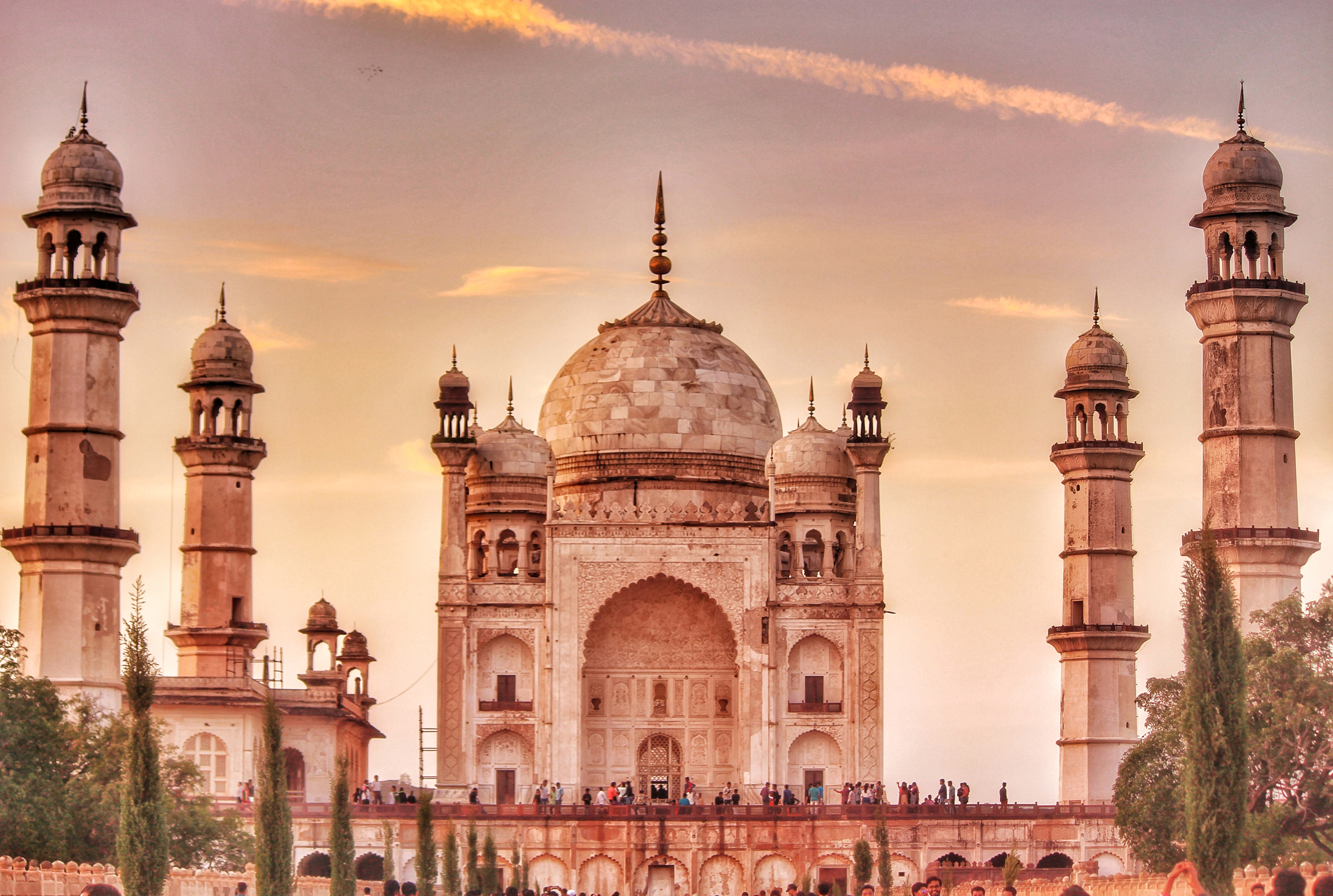
Bibi Ka Maqbara tomb in Aurangabad, Maharashtra, built by Mughal emperor Aurangzeb's son Azam Shah for his mother.

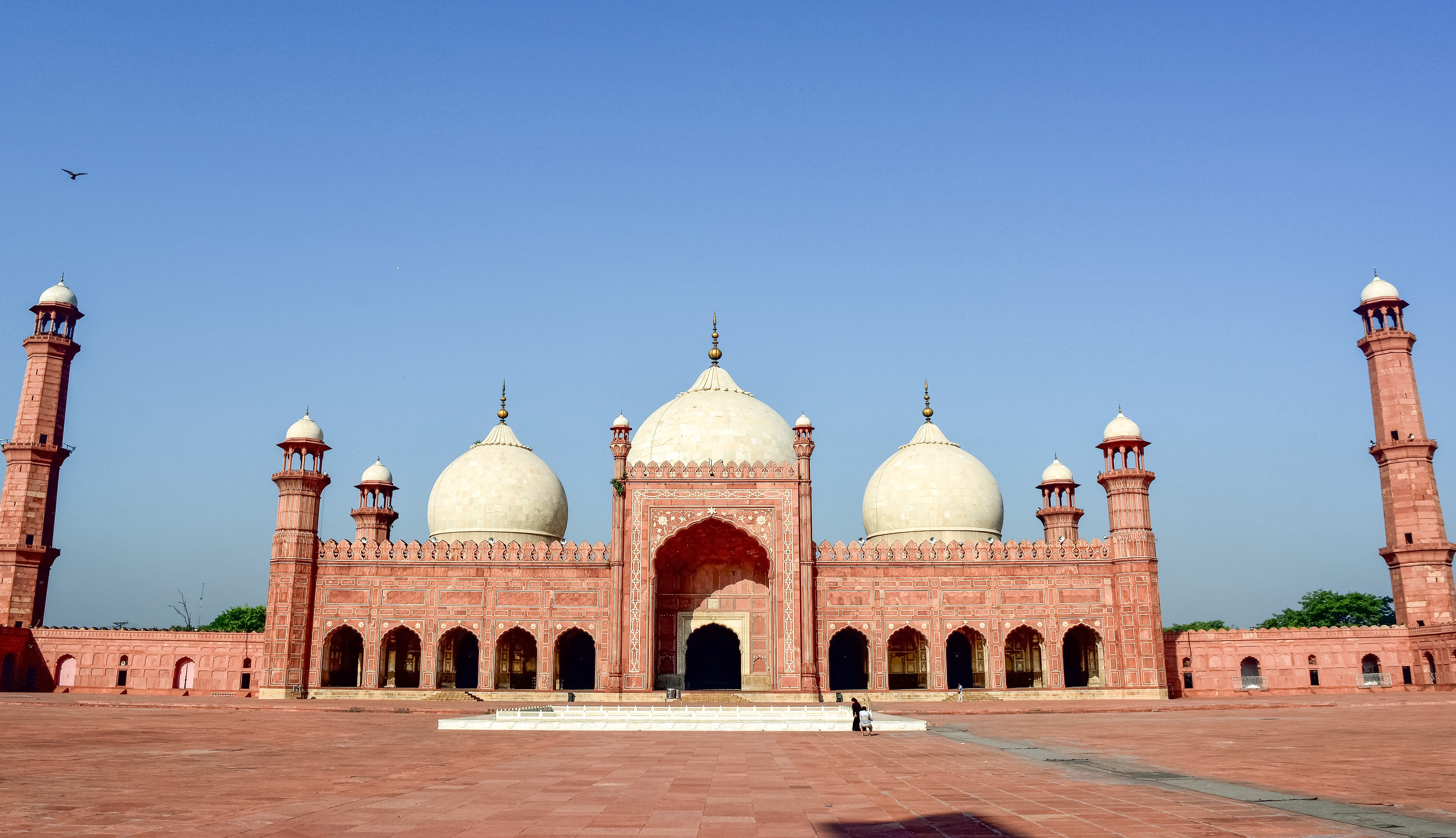
Badshahi mosque in Lahore, Pakistan, late Mughal, built 1673–1674.

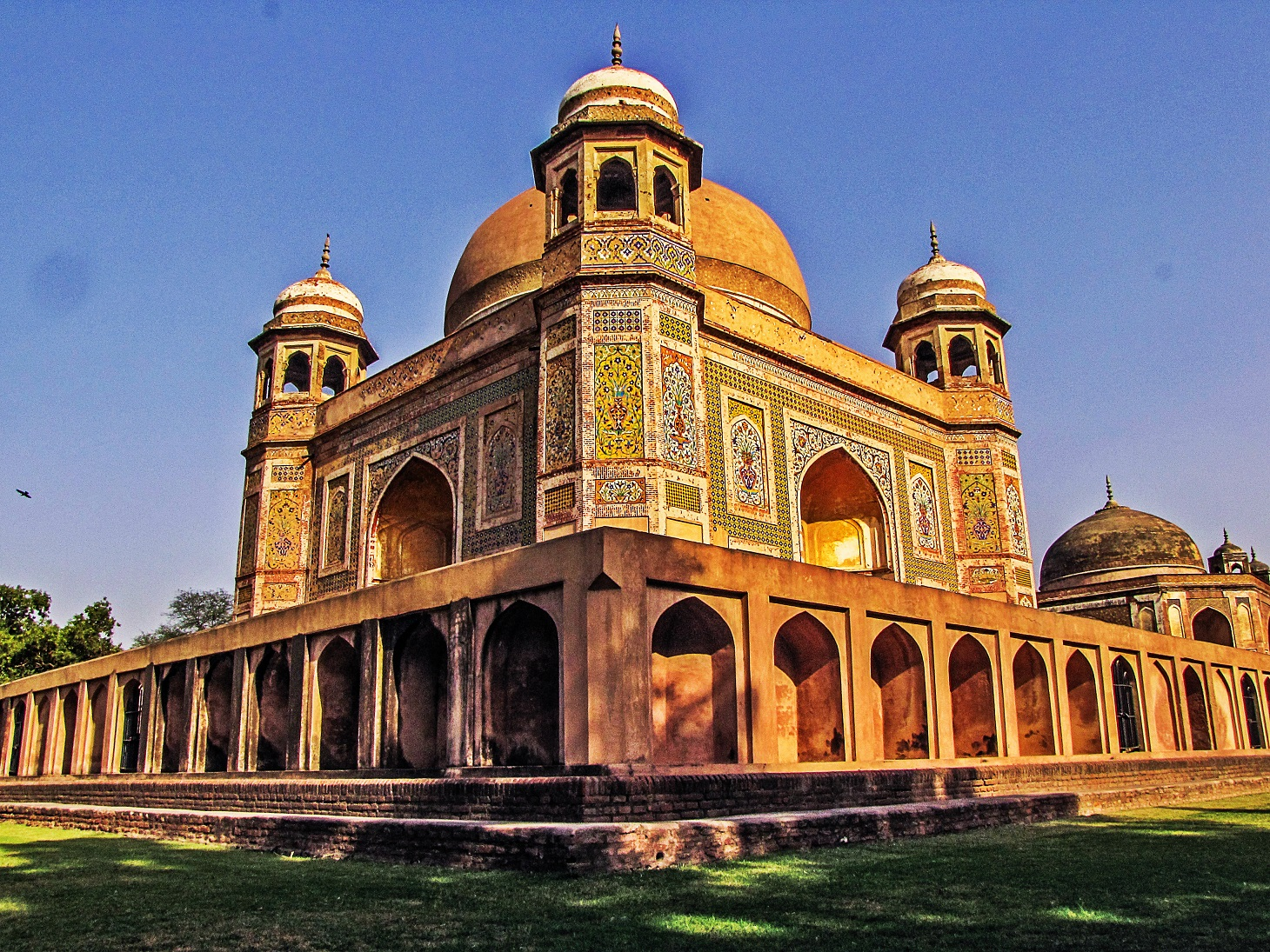
One of the Tombs of Ustad-Shagird, Nakodar, India.

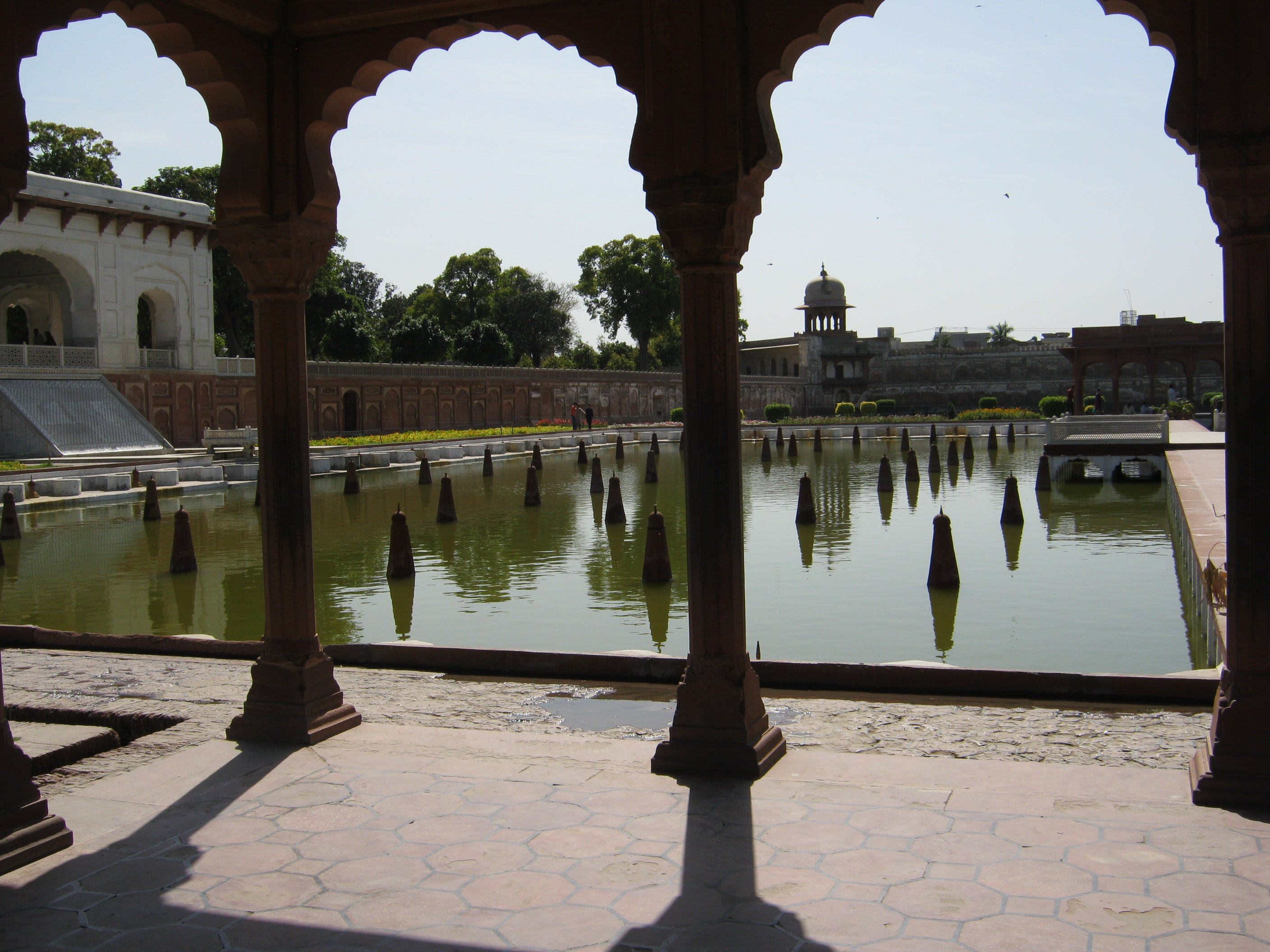
Shalimar Gardens, Lahore, Pakistan

=== Taj Mahal ===
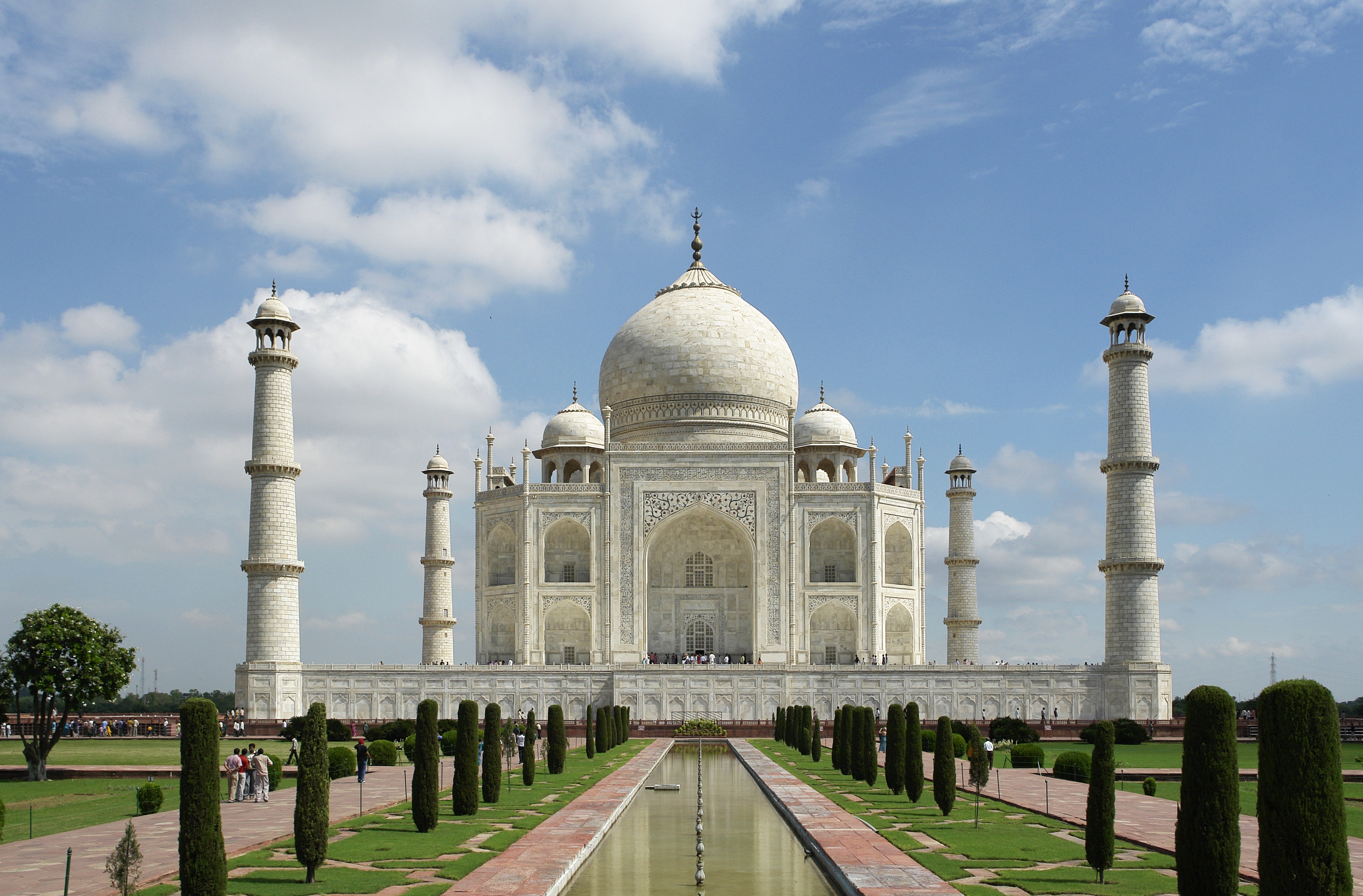
The Taj Mahal in Agra, India, widely considered the pinnacle of Islamic architecture in the subcontinent.

The best known example of Mughal architecture is the Taj Mahal. It was built as a mausoleum for Mumtaz Mahal, the wife of Shah Jahan, who died in 1631. The main ideas and themes of garden tombs had already been explored by earlier Mughal emperors, and this was the culmination of all those previous works into a national landmark. The white tomb rises above a reflecting pool, within a large walled garden.

=== Red Fort ===
The Red Fort in Delhi is also an important example of Mughal Architecture. It was built during the zenith of the Mughal Empire under Shah Jahan. It was designated a UNESCO World Heritage Site in 2007. As one of the largest forts in India, it served as the official residence of the emperor for nearly 200 years.

== Post-Mughal Islamic architecture ==
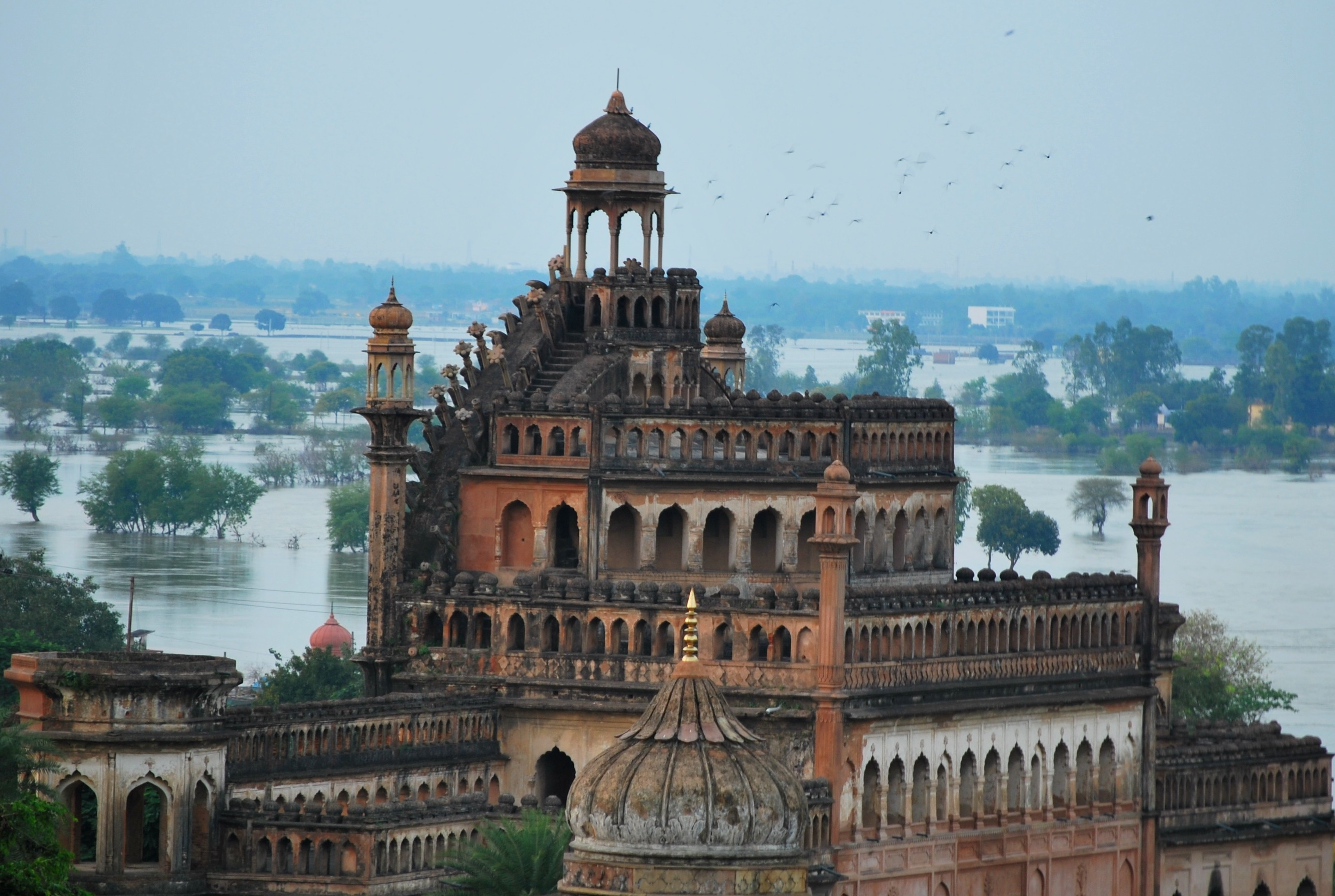
The Rumi Darwaza in Lucknow, 1784, from the rear, during flooding.

Following the collapse of the Mughal Empire after the Mughal-Maratha Wars, the emergence of the Sikh Empire and the invasions of Nader Shah, Ahmad Shah Durrani and the British East India Company, prosperous provinces of the Mughal Empire such as Awadh, Bengal, Hyderabad and Mysore emerged as powerful regional states independent of Delhi.

In Awadh (encompassing modern eastern Uttar Pradesh), Lucknow emerged as a centre of Ganga-Jamuni culture and Urdu/Hindustani literature. The Nawabs of Awadh sponsored the construction of architectural masterpieces such as Bara Imambara, Rumi Darwaza, Chota Imambara, Sikandar Bagh and Ghantaghar in Lucknow, as well as Gulab Bari and Bahu Begum ka Maqbara in Faizabad.

In Hyderabad, the Asaf Jahi dynasty became exceedingly wealthy and were one of the richest royal families in the world by the mid-20th century. The Nizam commissioned construction of various public works and buildings in their state (often in Indo-Saracenic and Mughal style) such as the Telangana High Court, City College, Public Gardens, (formerly Bagh-e-Aaam), Jubilee Hall, Asafia Library, The Assembly building, Niloufer Hospital, the Osmania Arts College and Osmania Medical College, as well as palaces like Hyderabad House and Chowmahalla Palace.

The so-called Indo-Saracenic architecture, beginning in the late 18th century, but mainly developing from the 1840s until independence a century later, was mostly designed by British or other European architects, and adopted Islamic or specifically Indian features, usually as a decorative skin on buildings whose essential forms reflected contemporary Western types and uses, whether as office buildings, palaces, courts of justice, railway stations or hotels. The style, which is very variable, thus became one of a number of revival architecture styles that were available to the Victorian architect. The usual type of Indian architecture borrowed from was Mughal architecture, or its Rajput palace version.

== See also ==
- Indo-Persian culture
- South Asian domes
