= List of tourist attractions in Lucknow =

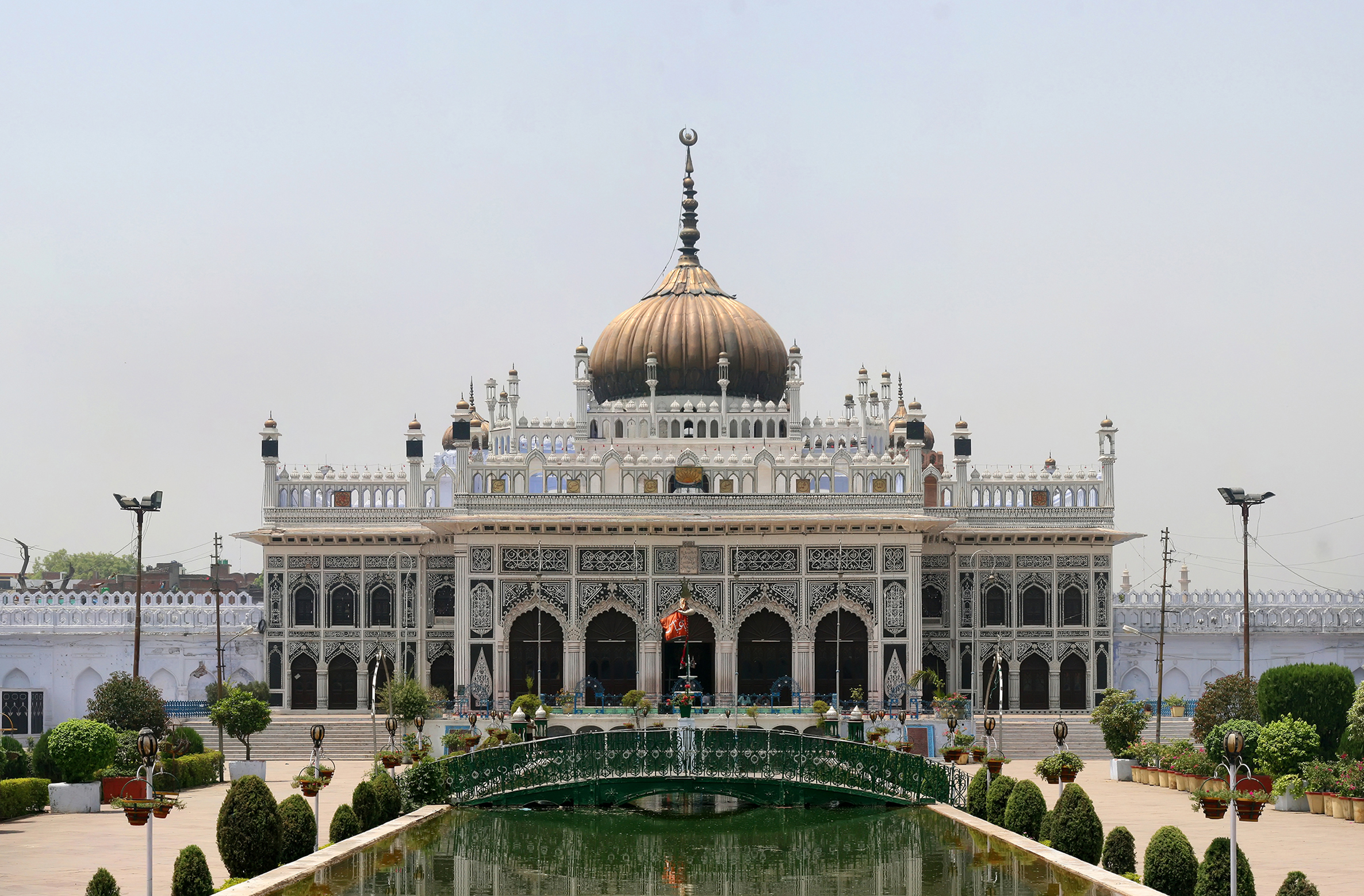
Chhota Imambara, Lucknow

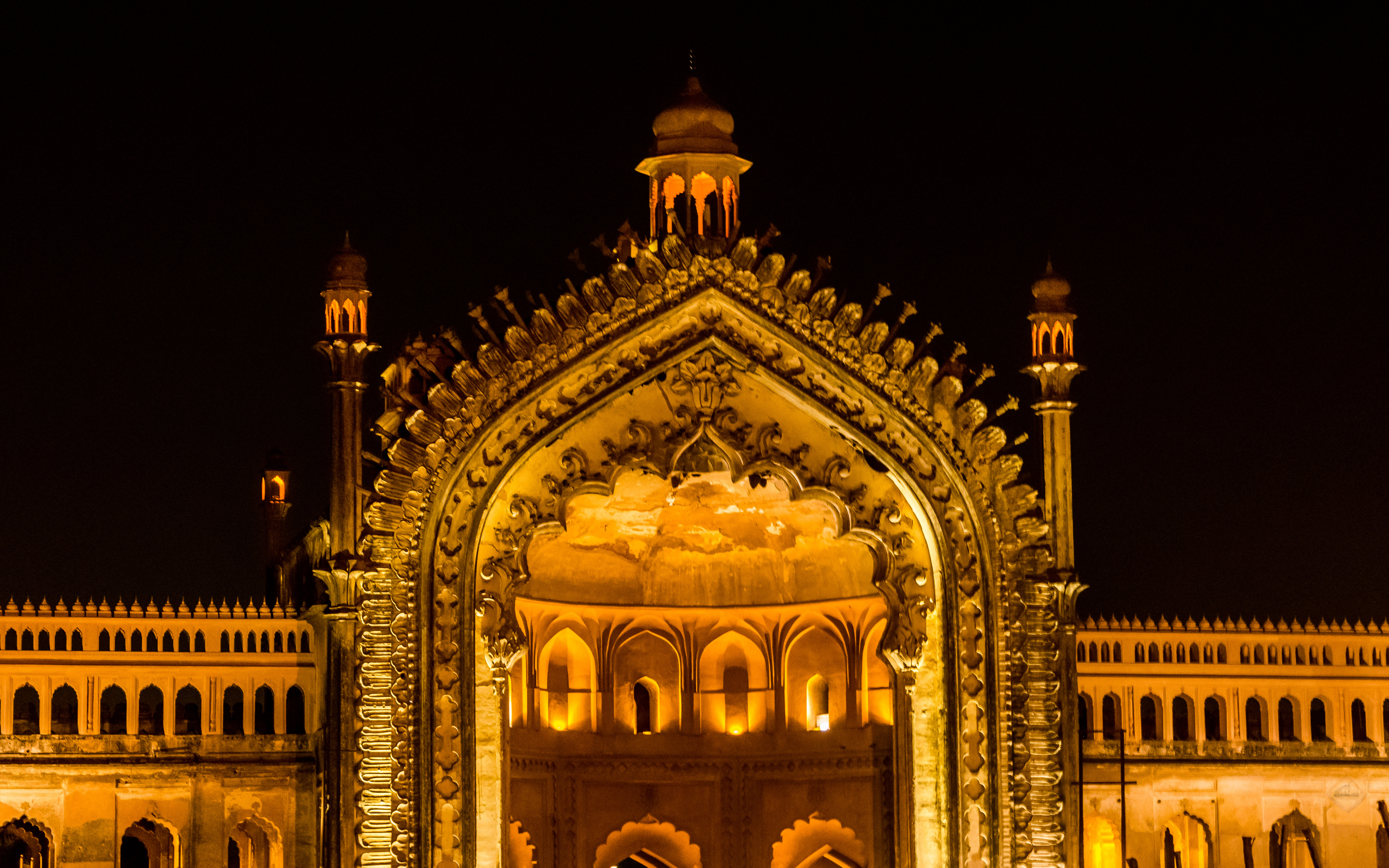
Rumi Darwaza, Lucknow

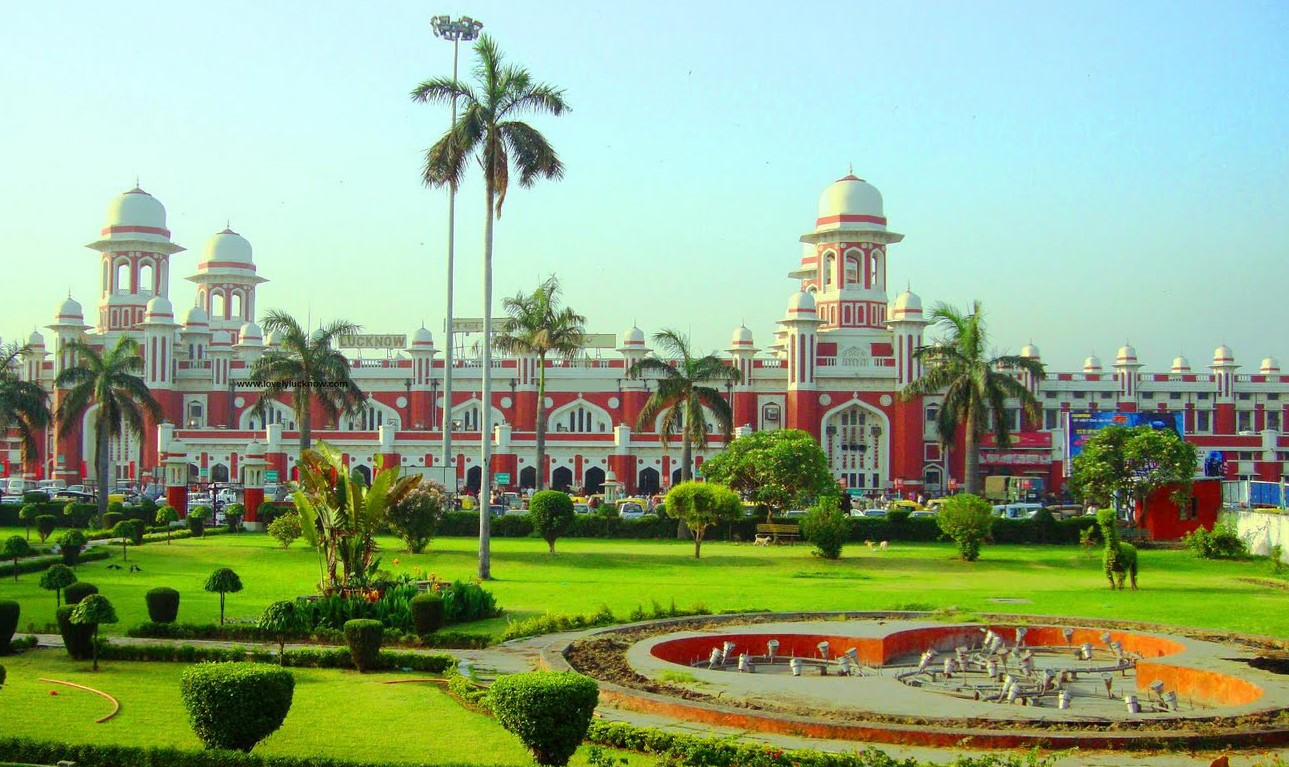
Charbagh Railway Station, Lucknow

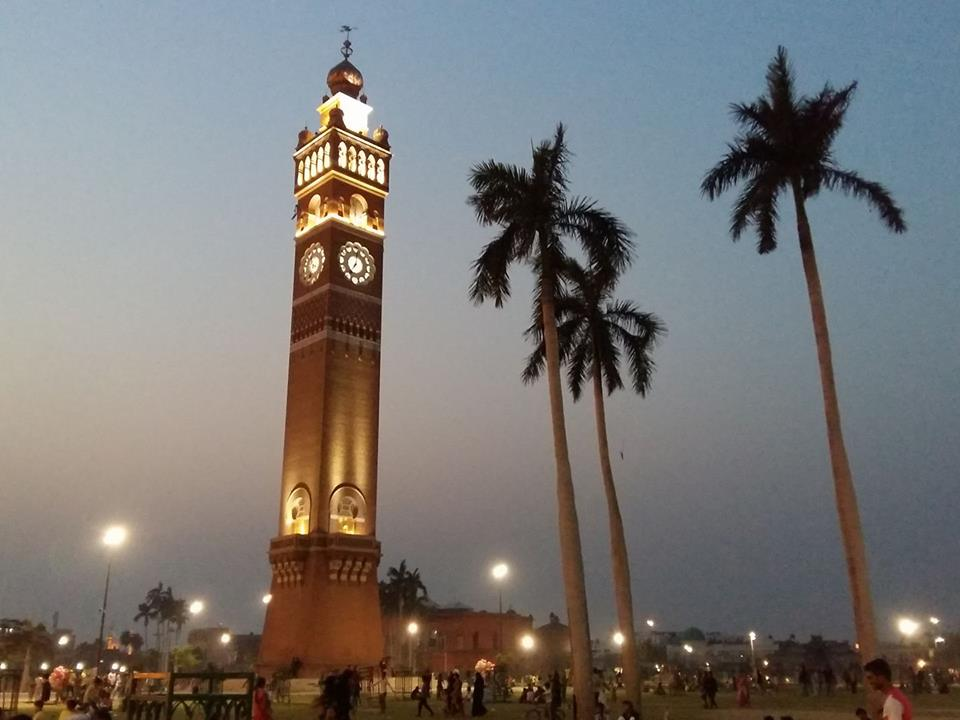
Husainabad Clock Tower, Lucknow

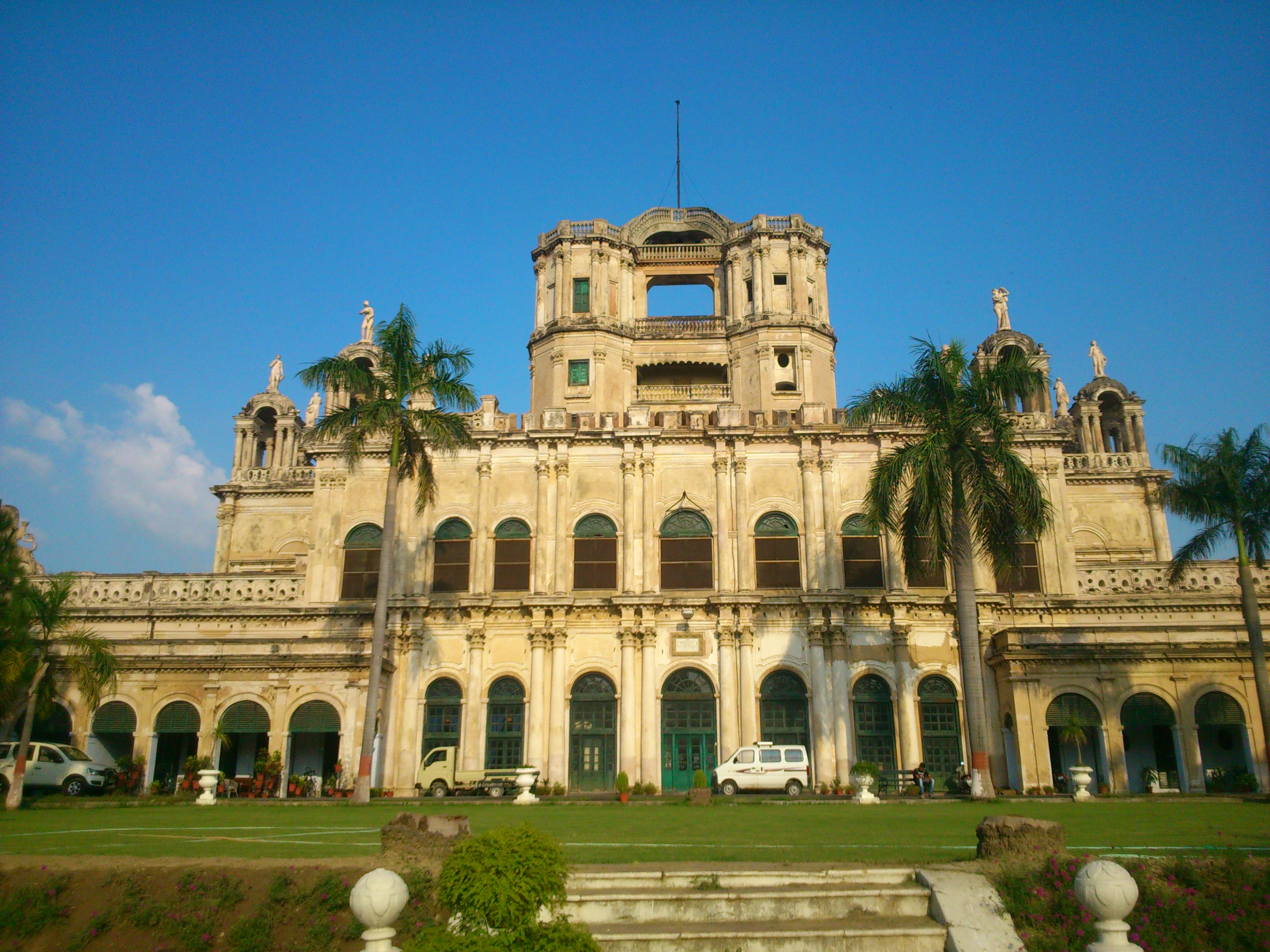
La Martinere College, Lucknow

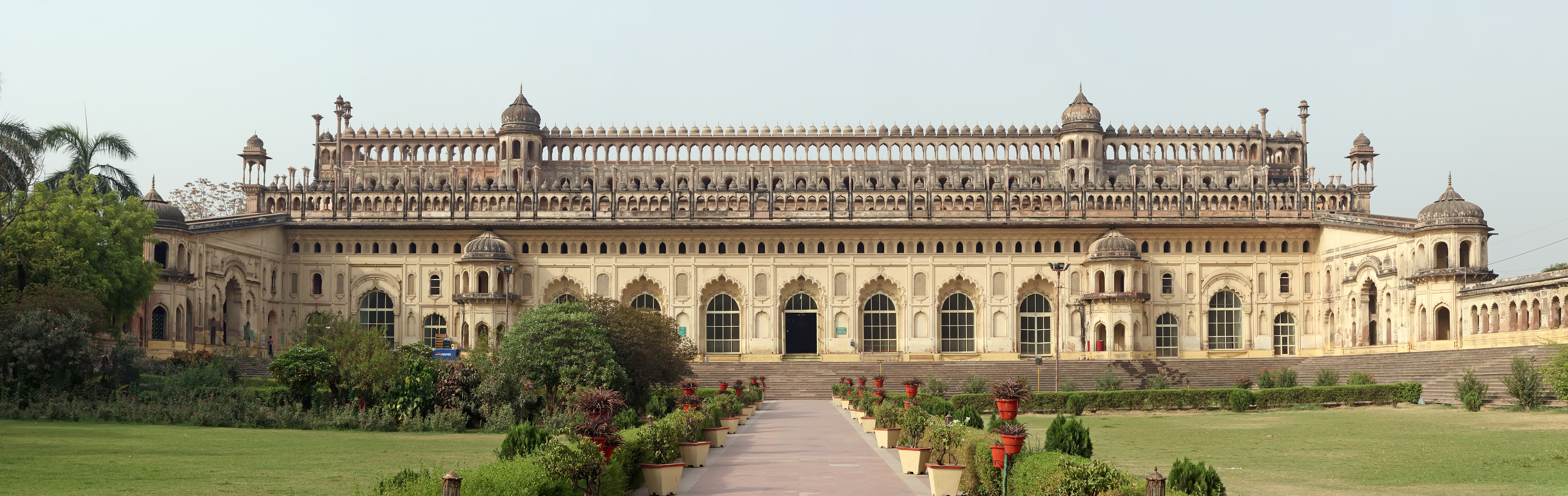
Bara Imambara, Lucknow

This is a list of tourist attractions in Lucknow, the capital city of Indian state of Uttar Pradesh

== Heritage ==
=== Imambaras of Lucknow ===
Lucknow has more than 75 imambaras, for which it is known as the 'City of Imambaras', and also the centre of Azadari in India. The most popular imambaras of Lucknow are:

- Bara Imambara
- Chhota Imambara
- Imambara Shah Najaf
- Imambara Ghufran Ma'ab
- Sibtainabad Imambara
- Rauza of Imam Hussain, Karbala Nasiruddin Haider
- Rauza-e-Kazmain

=== Prominent Landmarks ===
- Rumi Darwaza
- Qaisar Bagh Palace Complex
- Charbagh Railway Station
- La Martinere College
- The Residency, Lucknow
- Jama Masjid
- Chhatar Manzil
- Husainabad Clock Tower
- Satkhanda
- Hazratganj Market
- Sikandar Bagh
- Vidhan Bhavan, Lucknow

=== Other Important Heritage Properties ===
- Musa Bagh
- Safed Baradari
- Dilkusha Kothi
- University of Lucknow
- Darul Uloom Nadwatul Ulama
- Bhatkhande Sanskriti Vishwavidyalaya
- Christ Church, Lucknow
- Church of Epiphany, Lucknow

== Parks and Gardens ==
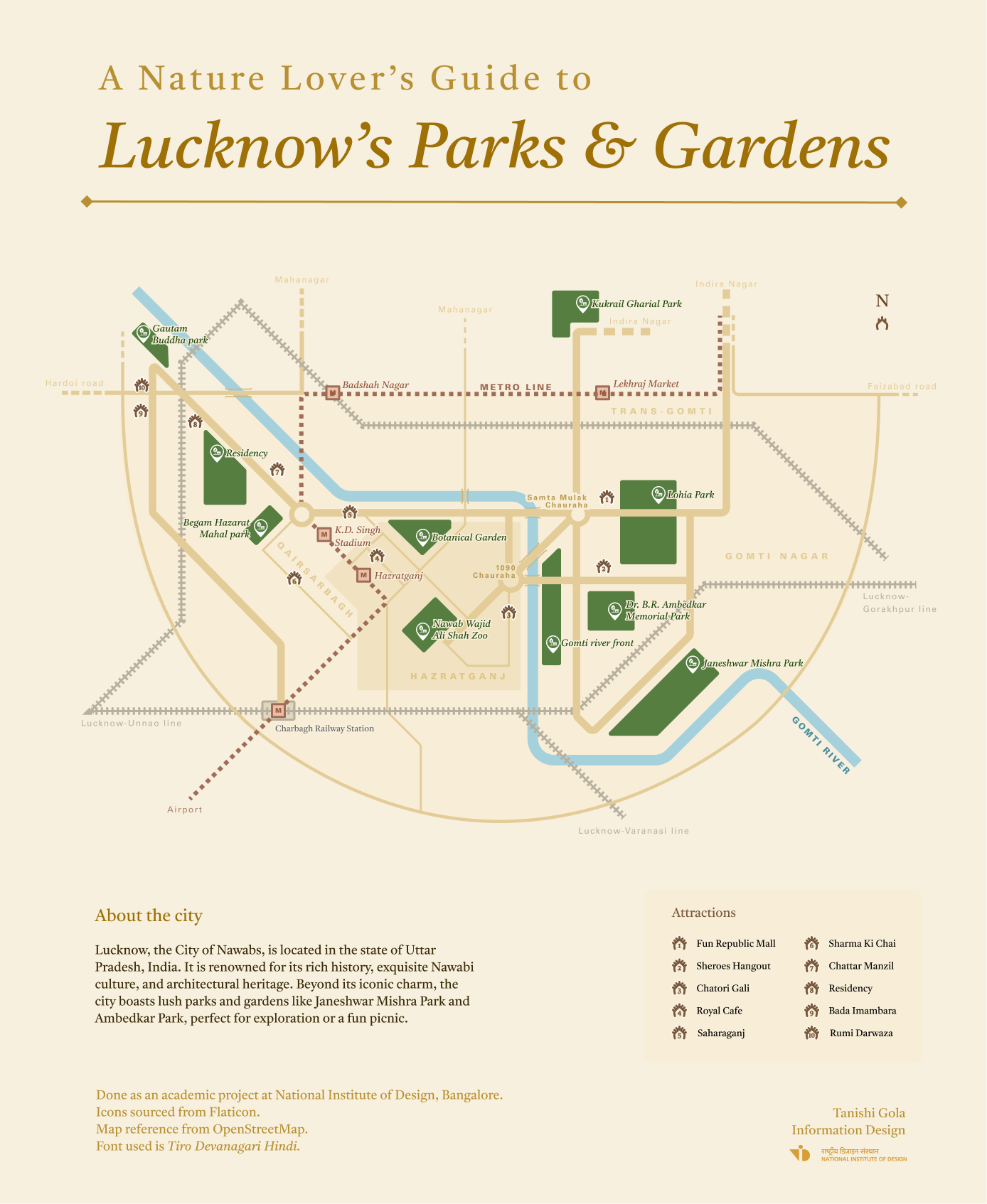
A schematic map of Lucknow's parks and gardens in English

- Banarasi Bagh – A former Nawabi-era royal garden, now occupied by the Nawab Wajid Ali Shah Prani Udyan and State Museum, Lucknow.
- Badshah Bagh – A former Nawabi-era royal garden, now part of the University of Lucknow campus and home to Lal Baradari.
- Sikandar Bagh – A historic royal garden of the Nawabi era, now home to the botanical garden of the CSIR–National Botanical Research Institute.
- Ambedkar Memorial Park
- Globe Park
- Botanical Garden
- Janeshwar Mishra Park
- Dr. Ram Manohar Lohia Park, Gomti Nagar
- Manyawar Shri Kanshiram Ji Green Eco Garden
- Gomti Riverfront Park
- Gautam Buddha Park
- Hathi Park
- Nibu Park

== Others ==
- Chandrika Devi Temple, Lucknow
- Kukrail Reserve Forest and Gharial Breeding Centre
- Indira Gandhi Planetarium, Lucknow
- Regional Science City, Lucknow
- Dewa Sharif
- Chinhat

== Gallery ==
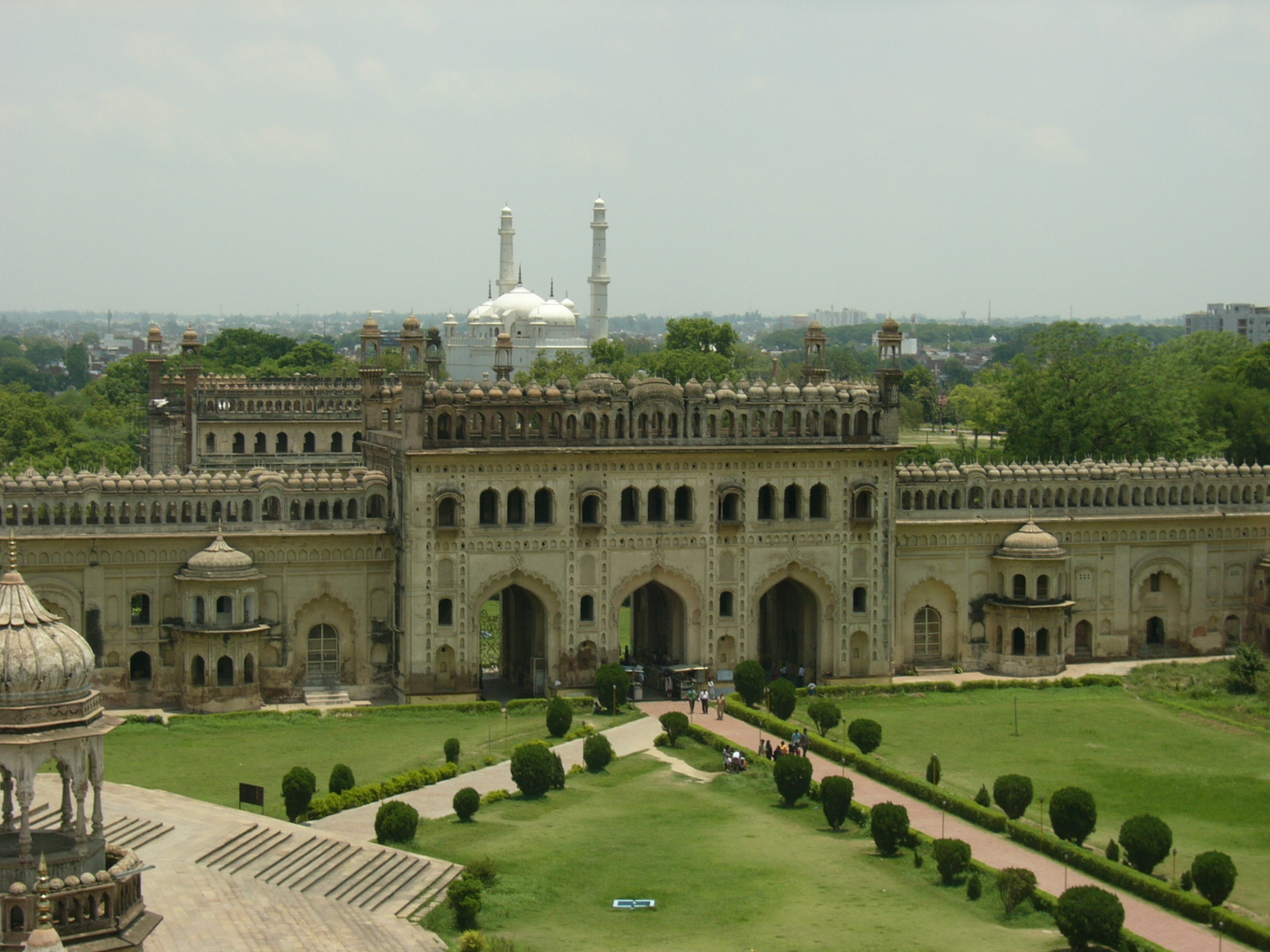
Gateway to Bara Imambara

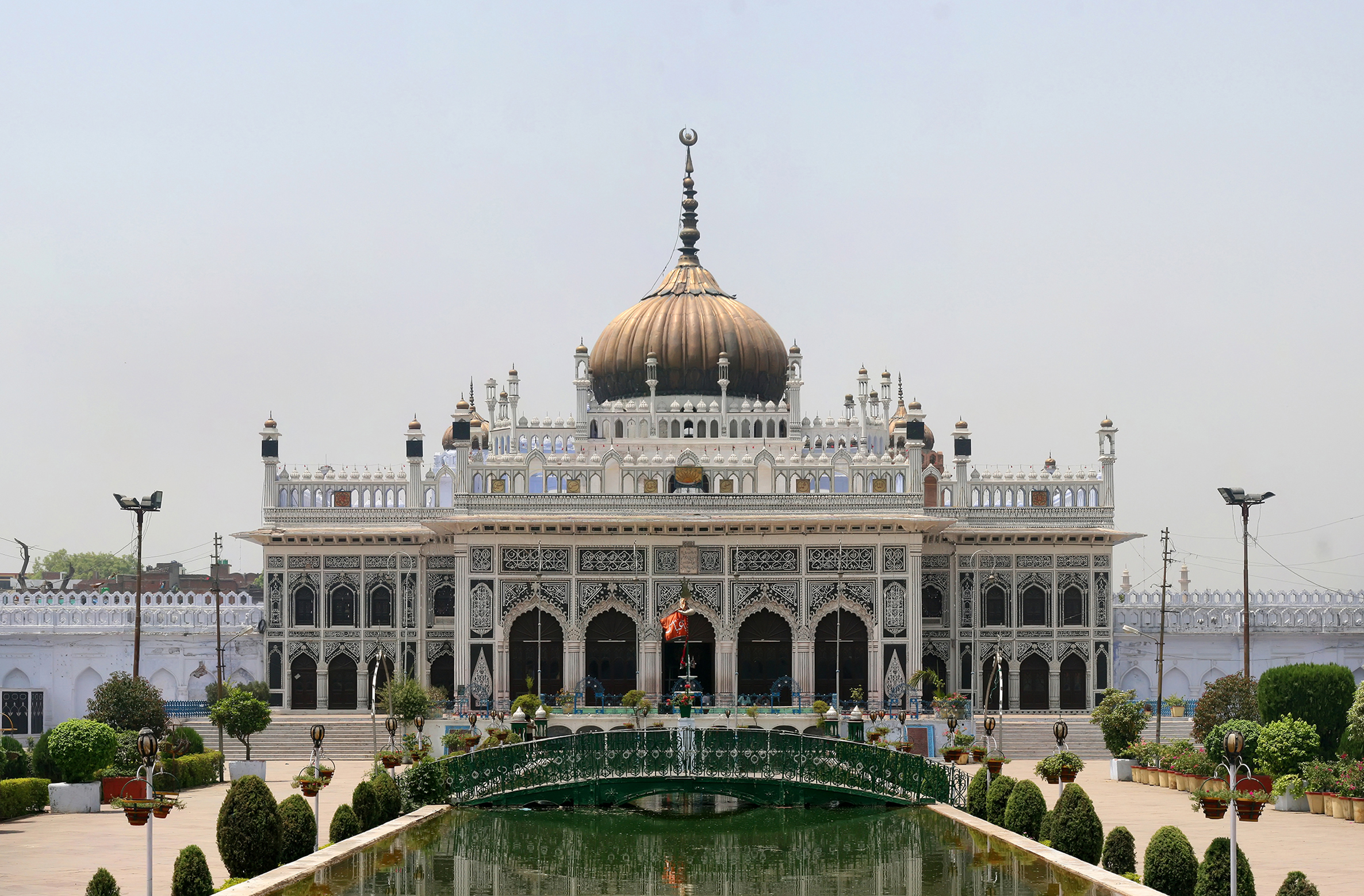
The Chhota Imambara

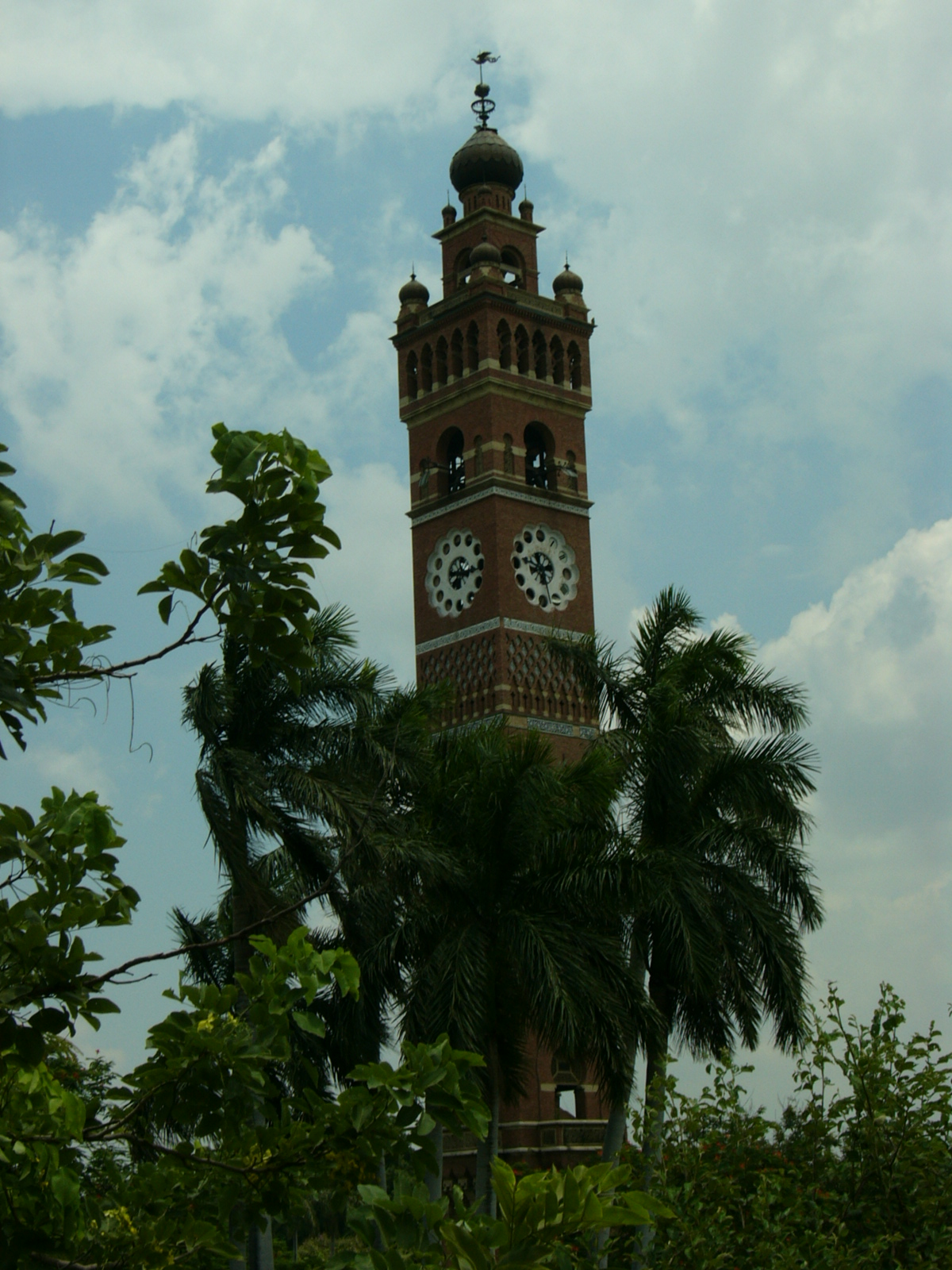
Husainabad Ghanta Ghar

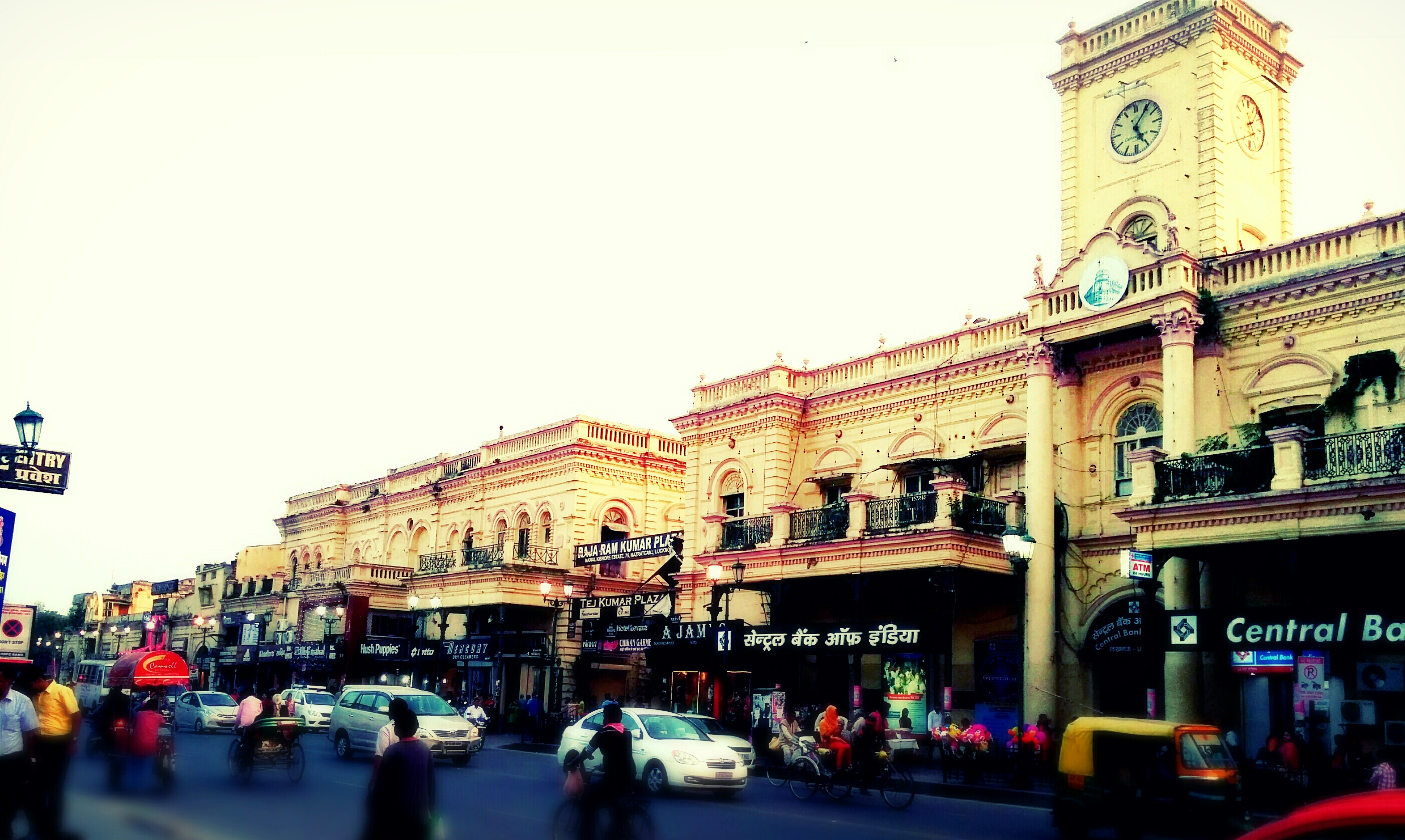
Hazratganj Market

Ambedkar Memorial

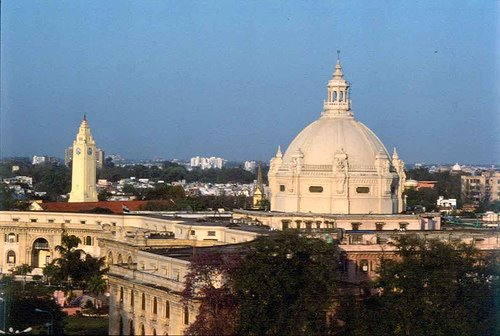
Vidhan Sabha Bhawan, Lucknow
