= Awadhi =

Awadhi may refer to:

- Something of, from, or related to the Awadh or Oudh region in Uttar Pradesh, northern India
  - Awadhi people, ethnic group of India
    - Awadhi language, their Indo-Aryan language
  - Awadhi cuisine, part of Indian cuisine
  - Awadhi architecture

== See also ==
- AUDH (disambiguation)
- Didier Awadi (born 1969), Senegalese rapper
- Awhadi Maraghai (1274/75–1338), Persian Sufi poet
