= AUDH =

Audh may refer to:

- AUDH, an abbreviation for the chemical (Aldos-2-ulose dehydratase)
- Awadh or Audh, a princely state of Northern India

== See also ==
- Awadhi (disambiguation)
