= Architecture of Lucknow =

School of architecture

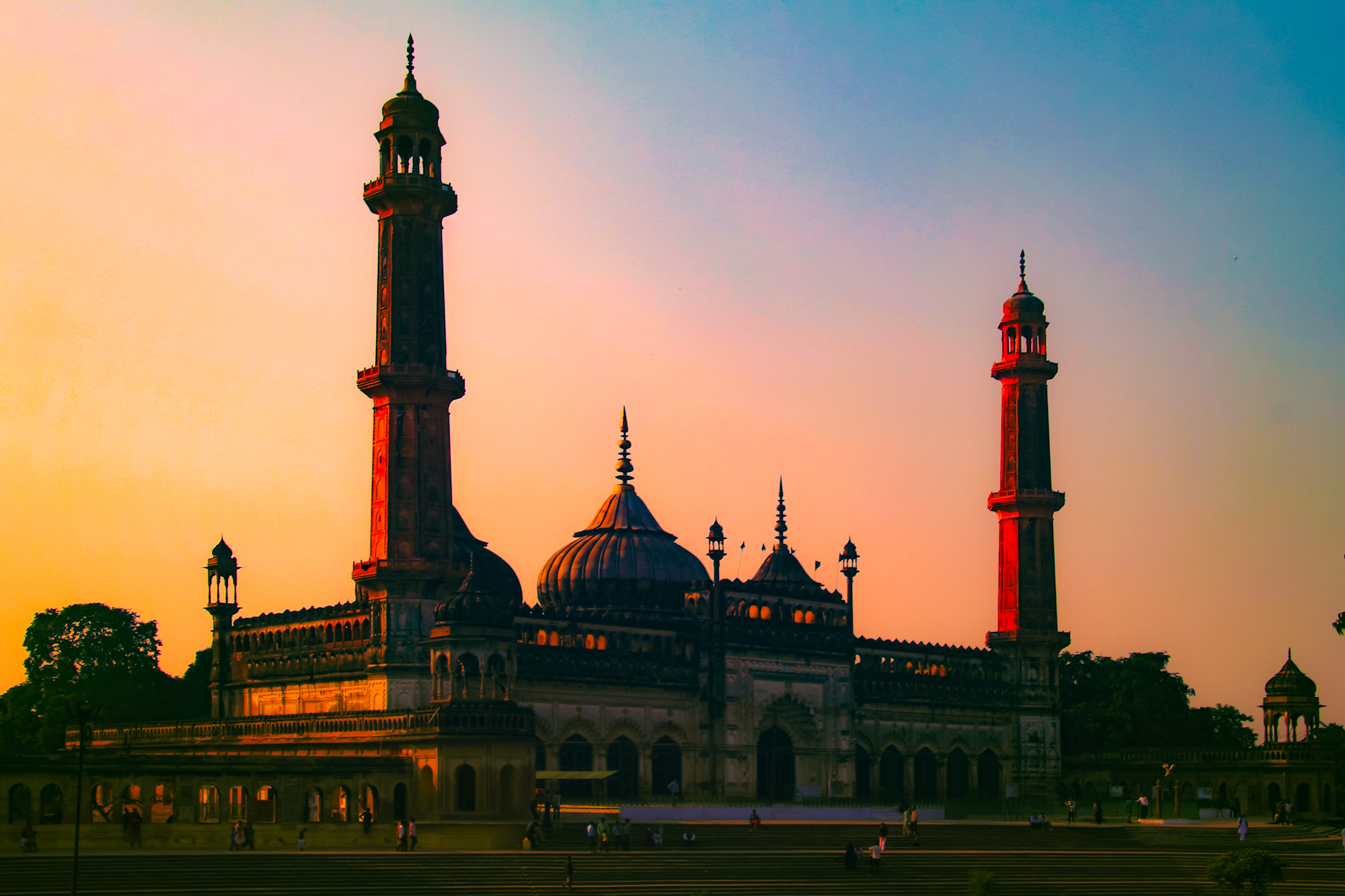
Asafi Mosque in Lucknow, associated with Asaf ud-Daula

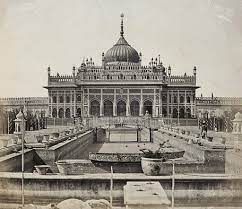
Hussainabad Imambara (Chota Imambara)

The architecture of the city of Lucknow started to flourish once the capital of "Awadh" or "Oudh" was moved by Nawab Wazir Asafud-Daulah from Faizabad to Lucknow in 1775. The Lucknow school of architecture was an experiment by the resurgent Nawabs of Awadh. It was an attempt to preserve the Mughal school of architecture by experimenting with different materials and adopting new innovative concepts.

Among the extant architecture there are religious buildings such as imambaras, mosques and other Islamic shrines, and secular structures like enclosed gardens, baradaris, and palace complexes.

Lucknow’s geography also plays a major role in determining the type of structures built. Lucknow is based on fertile land, and the land below the Himalayan foothills is known as 'Terai' or moist land. It is located in the middle of Ganaetic Plain and reaches Gomati (left of Ganga River), placing it in the center of Uttar Pradesh.

The monuments in Lucknow have been influenced by various cultures and religions throughout the years. Dating back to the 18th century, Lucknow also named "Awadh", or "Oudh" was one of the richest semi-independent states under the Mughal rule and was predominantly ruled by Muslim Shiites of Persian origin known as “Nawabs”. Being defeated by the British Imperial forces, the nawabs made an alliance with the East India Company until it was annexed in 1856. It is for this reason that there are various influences from Persia, Turkey, and Europe (such as France).

== History ==
Some architectural activity in the Lucknow region predates the Nawabi period: one of the oldest surviving monuments in the region is the Barah Khamba (Shamir Khan’s Tomb), situated in Malihabad. According to the Archaeological Survey of India, two inscriptions were found at the site. One inscription records the construction of a building, identified as a tomb, by Shamir Khan during his lifetime in AH 975 (1567–68 CE), during the reign of Akbar. The second inscription refers to the death of his sons in the same year, suggesting that the site may have served as a family burial place.

However, the architecture of the city only started flourishing once the capital of "Awadh" or "Oudh" moved from Faizabad to Lucknow in 1775 by Nawab Wazir Asafud-Daulah (1775-1798). Under Asafud - Daulah’s rule, the city hosted variously educated and skilled literates and workers, poets, and soldiers. Lucknow flourished under Asaf-ud-daula’s reign as it was during this period that the city grew outwards past Macchi Bhawan and the Chowk area. It was during this period that Rumi Darwaza, Daulat Khana, Asafi Kothi, Hussainabad Imambaras, Bibiapur Kothi and various gardens such as “Aishbagh, Charbagh, Yahiyaganj, Wazirganj, Amaniganj, Fatehganj, Rakabganj, Daulatganj, Begumganj and Nakkhas” (pp. 54) were built. He was also integral in making market streets or ‘bazaars’ and therefore can be attributed to Lucknow’s fame and glory.

In 'My Indian Mutiny Diary' (1857; pp. 57–58), William Howard Russell describes the city with:

"A vision of palaces, minars, domes azure and golden, cupolas, colonnade, long faced of fair perspective in pillar and column, terraced roofs - all rising up amid a calm and still ocean of the brightest verdure. Look for moles and miles away, and still the ocean spreads, and the towers of the fair-city gleam in its midst. Spires of gold glitter in the sun. Turrets and gilded spheres shine like constellation. There is nothing mean or squalid to be seen. There is a city more vast than Paris, as it seem, and more brilliant lying before us. Is this the city of Oudh?"

The change in Lacknavi landscape occurred after the introduction to Colonial rule when Wajid Ali Shah (the last Nawab) surrendered in 1856. There were various politically motivated demolitions and the change in landscape went through further change during the 1857 War of Independence. Previously, the second ruler of Awadh, Nawab Safdar Jang (1739–1756) attempted to restore an old fort in the city named Machchi Bhavan, however that building was destroyed by Sir Henry Lawrence during the 1857 uprising.

The city of Lucknow can easily be separated to Old or ‘Purana’ Lucknow or new Lucknow. This is because newer settlements surround the older settlements in the city - the older being south of the Gomti river with compacted settlements. Such settlement had grander courtyards which allowed for social gatherings in comparison to the newer settlements. The older section of the city has winding streets and lanes between 3–5 m in width with multiple story houses.

== Main features ==
The following are distinct features of Lucknow architecture:

- Use of fish as an auspicious and decorative motif especially on gates
- The use of Chattar (umbrella) as in the Chattar Manzil
- The Baradari (the twelve doorway pavilions)
- Rumi Darwaza, the signature structure of Lucknow
- Enclosed Baghs like Sikandar Bagh
- Vaulted halls such as the Asafi Imambara
- The labyrinth (Bhulbhulaiya)
- Taikhanas
- Use of lakhauri bricks

== Influences ==
=== Indo-Islamic influences ===
The Nawabs were an integral part of the city's architecture as they were the few with the means to construct the monuments that still hold today. These were the Iranian group of Mughal nobility and therefore held a close connection to Persian ideologies which influenced a lot of their stylistic features, for example, the animal motifs like the fish emblem. The majority of these fish emblems are to be found on arch spandrels of many entrances and gateways to monuments. All deceased Nawabs built a tomb, and their predecessors deserted their palaces to build their own.

Indigenous houses have a Mardana (men’s quarters) and a Zenana (women’s quarter’s) to satisfy the requirements of the propriety at the time. Whilst the Mardana was accessible through the street, the courtyard allowed access to the Zenan and played the role of ventilation. The indigenous houses also have been found to have labyrinth like networks that rarely open to big spaces and are mainly used by residents.This architecture had strategic importance as outsiders would be unable to comprehend the complexity of the narrow lanes and therefore discouraged stranger access.

Srivastava (1997) outlined the reason in their work (pp. 30–31) highlighting it

“allowed for the preservation of: (1) ritual, (2) socio-economic status of particular groups, and (3) the seclusion of women according to the Islamic traditions of Lucknow.”

=== European Influences ===
The hot Indian climate, especially through summer has been said to play a contributing factor to why the British preferred the European houses compared to the indigenous houses. The power structure and economics of the time allowed British India to construct more grander houses than ever before, which has been outlined by some to reiterate the cultural superiority felt by the British in Lucknow.

Unlike indigenous homes, European homes in the area do not have a central courtyard and have allocated private and public spaces within the house. This is effectively showcased in Dulkusha – one of the earliest European buildings in Lucknow. Furthermore, there are no separation of men and female spaces and the doors and windows were significantly larger. Ornamentation was now grandly exhibited on the outside compared to indigenous houses which ornamented on the inside.

=== Types of Buildings ===
Lucknow was studded with scores of monuments, gateways, Imambaras, mosques, tombs, and country houses, including more than a hundred monuments in all”.

==== Imambaras ====
Most of these monuments diverge from the traditional stone and iron frames and use bricks and mortar instead. They use ‘lakhauri’ bricks for bulbous domes, minarets arches and vaults, and tiles for their flooring. Keeping the religious requirements in mind, most imambaras allow for segregation and have designated male and female sections within each structure. A key aesthetic and practical component of Imambaras was the ‘Mehraab’ which was utilised to show the direction of prayer and usually included floral embellishments and engravings, along with calligraphy in the Arabic, Persian, or Urdu script. The furniture lamps and chandeliers manufactured and imported from around the world play an important role in decorating any imambara, and will therefore be utilised as a regular motif. Many imambaras also have mosques placed adjacent to the main building.

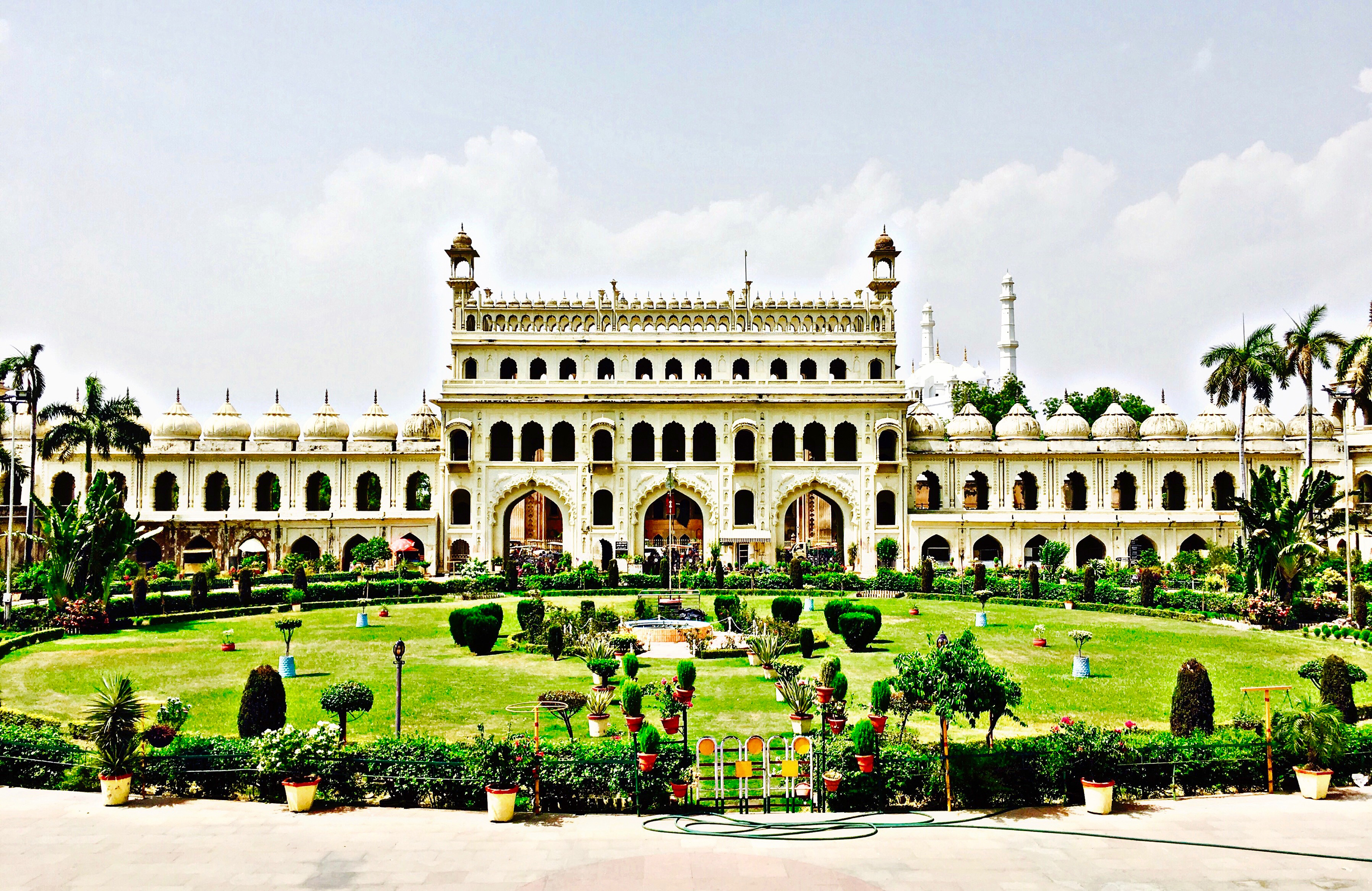
Bara Imambara

===== Asafi Imambara or Bara Imambara =====
One of the most treasured and significant monuments within Lucknow is the Asafi Imambara also known as the ‘Bara’ or big Imambara. The Asafi Imambara was made by the Delhi architect Kifayat Ullah. The main Imambara building consists of the main hall which has said to be the biggest hall of its kind. Mr. Fergussons has been relayed to outline the dimension of the monument in the Gazetteer of the Province of Oudh, Vol. II-H to M on page 356

“162 feet long by 53 feet 6 inches wide. On the two sides are verandahs respectively 26 feet 6 inches and 27 feet 3 inches wide, and at each end an octagonal apartment, 53 feet in diameter; the whole interior dimensions being thus 263 feet by 145.”

He then went on to describe the material and compared it to those used in the west on page 357.

"This immense building is covered with vaults of very (ample toxin and still simpler construction, being of a rubble or coarse concrete several feet in thickness, which is laid on a rude mould or centering of bricks and mud, and allowed to stand a year or two to dry and set. The centering is then removed, and the vault, being in one piece, stands with. out abutment or thrust, apparently a better and more durable form of roof than our most scientific Gothic vaulting; certainly far cheaper and far more easily made, since it is literally cast on a mud form, which may be moulded into any shape the fancy of the architect may dictate."

The gates of the Imambara are made of stone with a shape known as ‘chattri’ or umbrella. The mirror frames within the imambara are a well-known decorative motif for the Awadhi architecture. Replicating the signature style for Iranian tombs, the Asafi Imambara also has domed tops.

In 2018 the " parapet on the rear side of the 230-yearold building had collapsed after which the top of a minaret of the 180-year-old Jama Masjid in Tehseenganj area had collapsed due to a dust storm."

==== Parks and gardens ====
Lucknow has had the reputation of being "the city of gardens", as the royal gardens throughout history have contributed to the city landscape and fame, even though the vast majority of them have been private. These gardens incorporated Mughal aesthetic elements using "charbagh (four-square garden) geometry, baradaris (pavilions), water channels and pools, and orchard planting".

The Nawabi gardens were almost extinct after the 1857 mutiny – the only two remaining were Sikandar Bagh and Banarasi Bagh.

==== Bungalows ====
Bungalows are one story holiday homes used by British officers. The architecture maintained Palladian symmetry and utilized wooden columns for support, along with tiles for the roofs of verandas.

Typical features have been described by Sinha (1999, pp. 59)

“flat roof structures with windows covered with wooden venetian shitters and at least two verandahs, thatched or tiled… contained gardens, kitchens, stables and servant quarter… large central rooms surrounded by smaller spaces for dressing, bath and storage, and encircled by verandahs”

It is evident that designs typically maintained the individuals personal needs by giving importance to the dining and bedroom (which were usually situated in the centre of the home). Most bungalows also had designated garages, as they were usually occupied by wealthy individuals. Interestingly the design of such houses were easily altered for larger families i.e. two brothers would split the house in half through the centre or rooms in the bungalow would be shared with extended family members. There were usually no corridors, compelling occupants to cross bedrooms to get to communal spaces in the house – later designs included corridors to allow independent access to rooms. There were however some influences from the native people – the utilization of two kitchens. Some Hindus and Sikhs of the time were vegetarian, and therefore culture dictated that cutlery handling meat be separated from those that were not – this is one of the reason why some wealthier individuals ha one vegetarian kitchen and another non-vegetarian kitchen. Furthermore, bungalows ran entirely on the cheap Indian labor of the time requiring up to 20 servants. The excessive of servants described by Sinha (1999, pp. 60) to upkeep the house explains why contemporary owners find it difficult to maintain modern bungalows.

"servants were required to keep up the gardens, get water form the well, cook and clean, wait at tables, groom horses, remove waste from “thunder boxes” and engage in a multitude of other chores, leaving the housewife with few household responsibilities and ample leisure time."

Modern bungalows have water supply, electrical supplies and sewage system which does reduce the amount of manpower required.

== List of Monuments ==
Date Constructed	Name of Place	Type of Building
First Inhabited, 1000 BCE; Reached Zenith around 200BC-200AD	Hulās Kherā	Archaeological Sites in Mohanlalganj which has been speculated to have had a Kushan palace complex. A horseshoe Karela Jheel was also present around here.
During the reign of Akbar	Akbari Darwazah	Gate
During the reign of Akbar	Gol Darwazah	Gate
1685-1688 (During the rule of Aurangzeb)	Tīlē Wālī Masjid	Mosque Complex which also contains the Shrine of Pīr Shāh Muhammad
During the reign of Aurangzeb	Firangi Mahal	Islamic Seminary; Oldest one in Lucknow. Constructed originally by a frank merchant and thus the name.
1745	Imambara of Lucknow	Imambara
1775-1797	Rauza of Abas ibn Ali	Shrine
1780s	Chattar Manzili	Palace
1780-1800	The Residency	Building/ Housing
1784	Asafi Imambara or Bara (Big) Imambara	Imambara
1784	Rumi Darwaza	Gate
1790s	Imambara Ghufran Ma’ab	Imambara
1800-1805	Dilkusha Kothi	House
1818 - 1823	Imambara Shah Najaf	Imambara
1822–1887	Sikandar Baghu	Garden and Villa
Unknown	Ghār Wālī Karbalā/Karbalā Nasiruddīn Hyder	Shrine (Imambarah) based on one in Samarrah, Iraq. Resting place of the second Nawab, Nasirudding Hyder and his wife Qudsia Begum
Unknown.	Sakeena Masjid/Masjid Noor	Masjid/Mosque. Historic Mosque in Daliganj, in front of Shahi Masjid
Circa 1800s	Masjid Dhanne Khan/Masjid Daliganj Station	Historic Mosque, near Daliganj Railway Station. Visible from the station.
1830	Qadam-e-Rasooli	Shrine
1832	Jama Masjid	Mosque
1838	Chota (Small) Imambara	Imambara
1845–present	La Martiniere College	School
1847-1856	Qaisar Baghu	Garden
1850	The Rauza of Musa al-Kazimi	Shrine
Unknown	Naubat Khana of Bada Imambada	Drum house or orchestra pit
1860	The All Saints Church of Lucknow Garrison	Church
1860	The Church of Christ	Church
1881	Husainabad Clock Tower	Clock Tower
1898	Darul Ulum Nadwatul Ulama	Mosque/Madarsah Dārul 'Ulūm(Islamic Seminary)
1914-1923	Railway Station Lucknow Charbagh	Railway Station
1914	Nyjna e Lucknow (LJN) NER (Choti Line)	Railway Station
