= Musa Bagh =

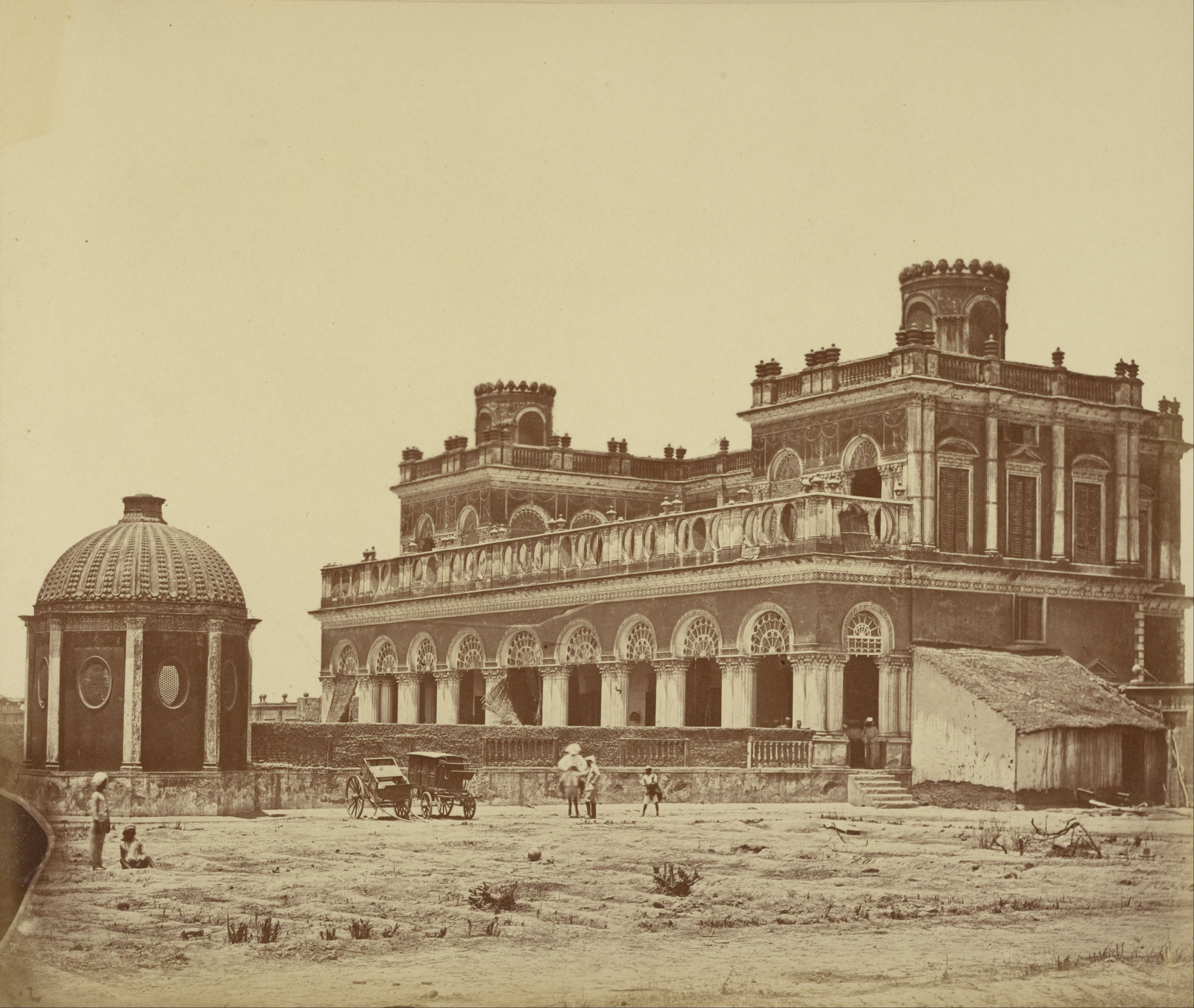
Musa Bagh in April 1858

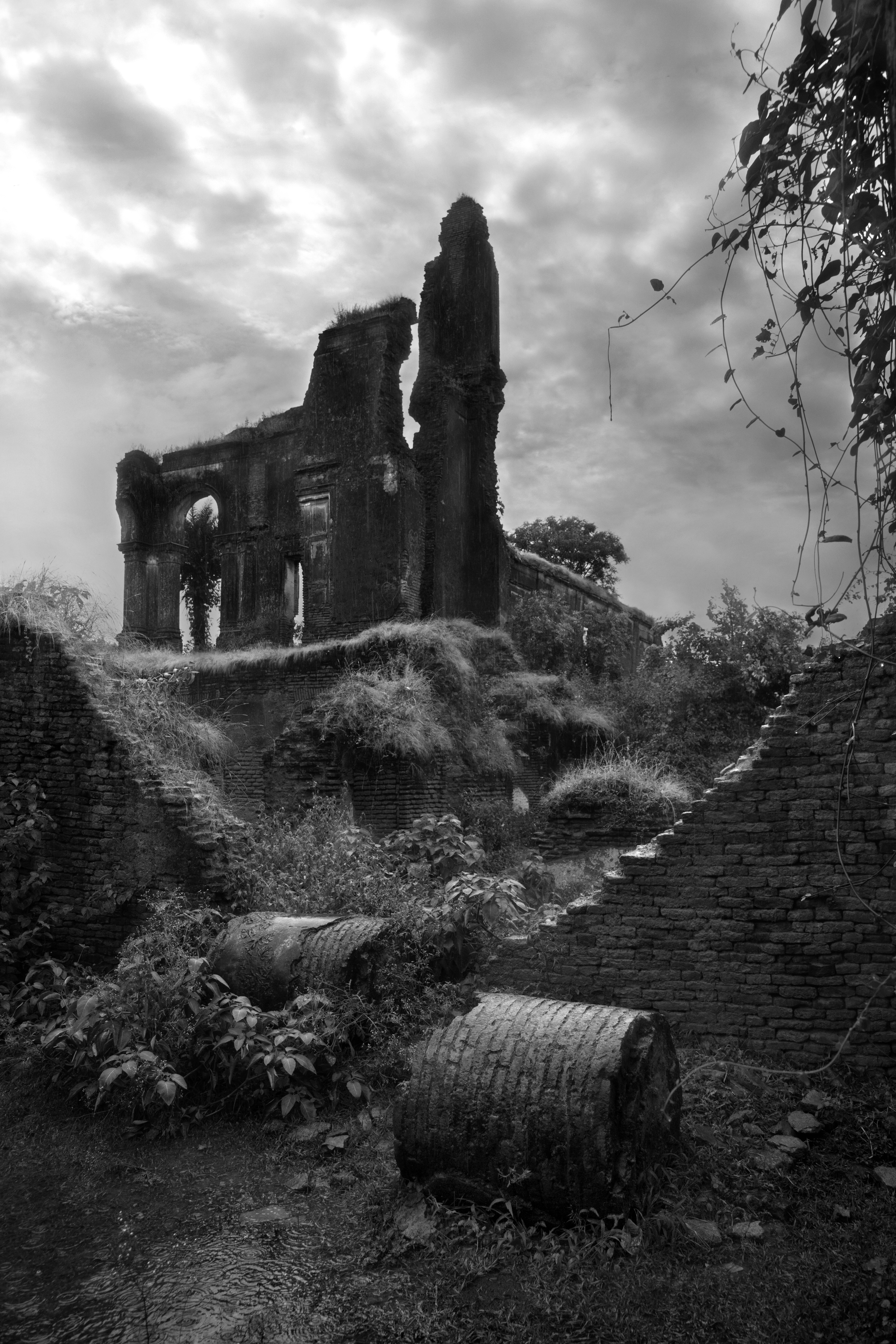
Musa Bagh ruins

Musa Bagh (Hindi: मूसा बाग़, Urdu: موسى باغ, translation: Garden of Moses), also known as Monsieur Bagh, is an extensive garden complex in the city of Lucknow of the Awadh region of India.

== See also ==
- Architecture of Lucknow
