= Rumi Darwaza =

Gateway in Lucknow, Uttar Pradesh, India

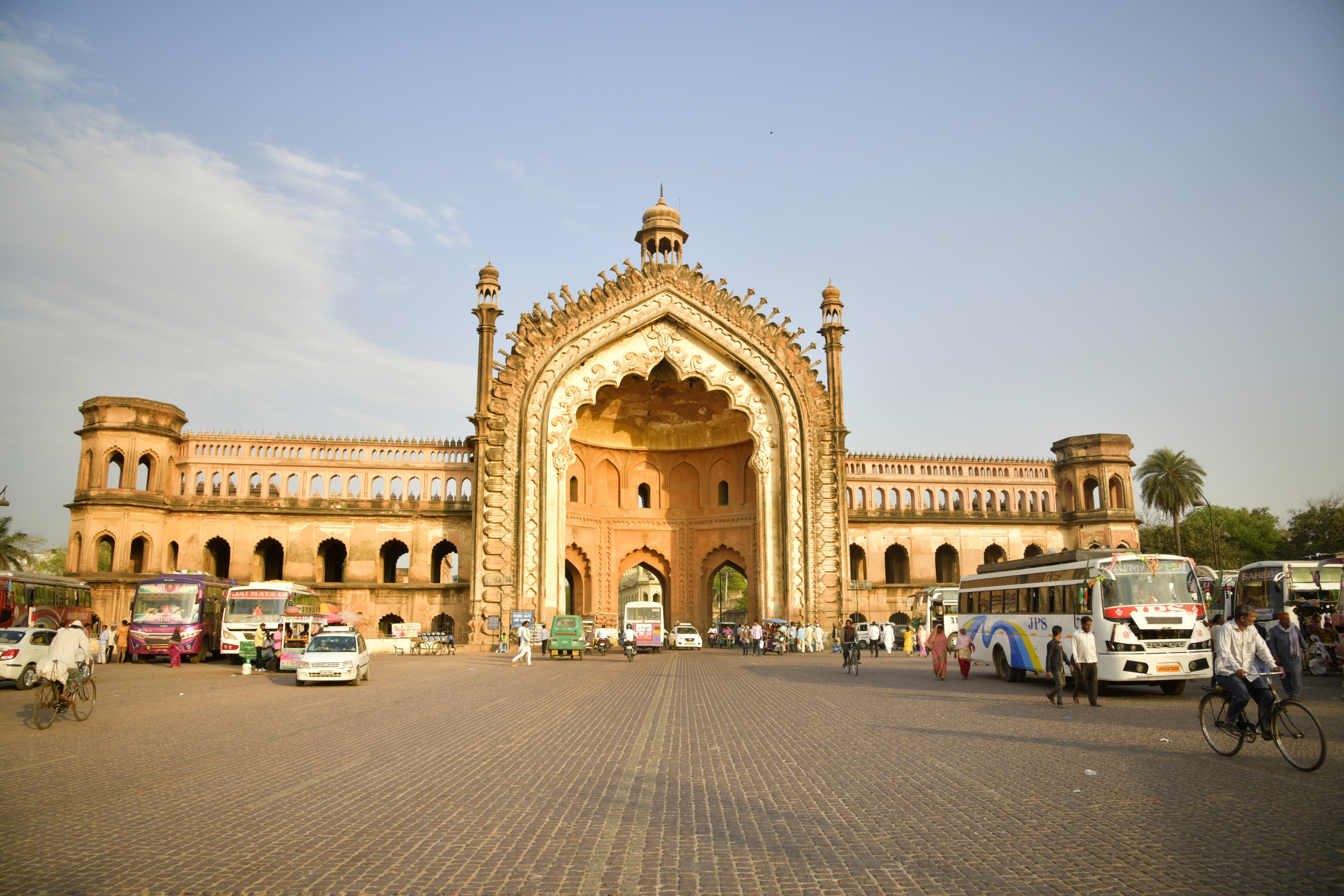
- Lucknow

- Location in eastern Uttar Pradesh, India Rumi Darwaza (India)
- 26.860556°N 80.915833°E
- Location: Lucknow, Uttar Pradesh, India

History
- Founder: Nawab Asaf-Ud-Daula, Mughal
- Built: 1784

Site notes
- Height: 18 m (59 ft)
- Architectural style: Awadhi

The Rumi Darwaza (sometimes known as the Turkish Gate), in Lucknow, Uttar Pradesh, India, is a gateway which was built by Nawab Asaf-Ud-Daula in 1784. It is an example of Awadhi architecture. The Rumi Darwaza is sixty feet tall and was modeled after the Sublime Porte in Istanbul.

It is adjacent to the Asafi Imambara, Teele Wali Masjid and used to mark the entrance to Old Lucknow. When the city grew and expanded, it was used as an entrance to a palace which was later demolished by the British Raj following the Indian Rebellion of 1857.

== Etymology ==
The gate was modelled after a historical gate in Constantinople. Rumi refers to Rûm, the historical name used by the Islamic world to denote the region roughly corresponding to Anatolia, or the dominion of the former Eastern Roman Empire. "Rumi Darwaza" in Hindustani translates to "Turkish Gate" in English.

== Design ==
The darwaza is distinct from Mughal architecture in terms of style and materials used. The design consists of a big arch and on top of that, there is a half-spherical dome resting on half-octagonal plan. The gate is built using thin burnt clay bricks and lime-crushed brick aggregate mortar (Lakhori and Surkhi respectively, which was prevalent during the rule of Nawabs in the 18th century). The gate boasts of intricate carvings of flowers.

== Location ==
The gate is between Bara Imambara and Chota Imambara.

== Gallery ==
Rumi Darwaza or Roomi Gate in Lucknow

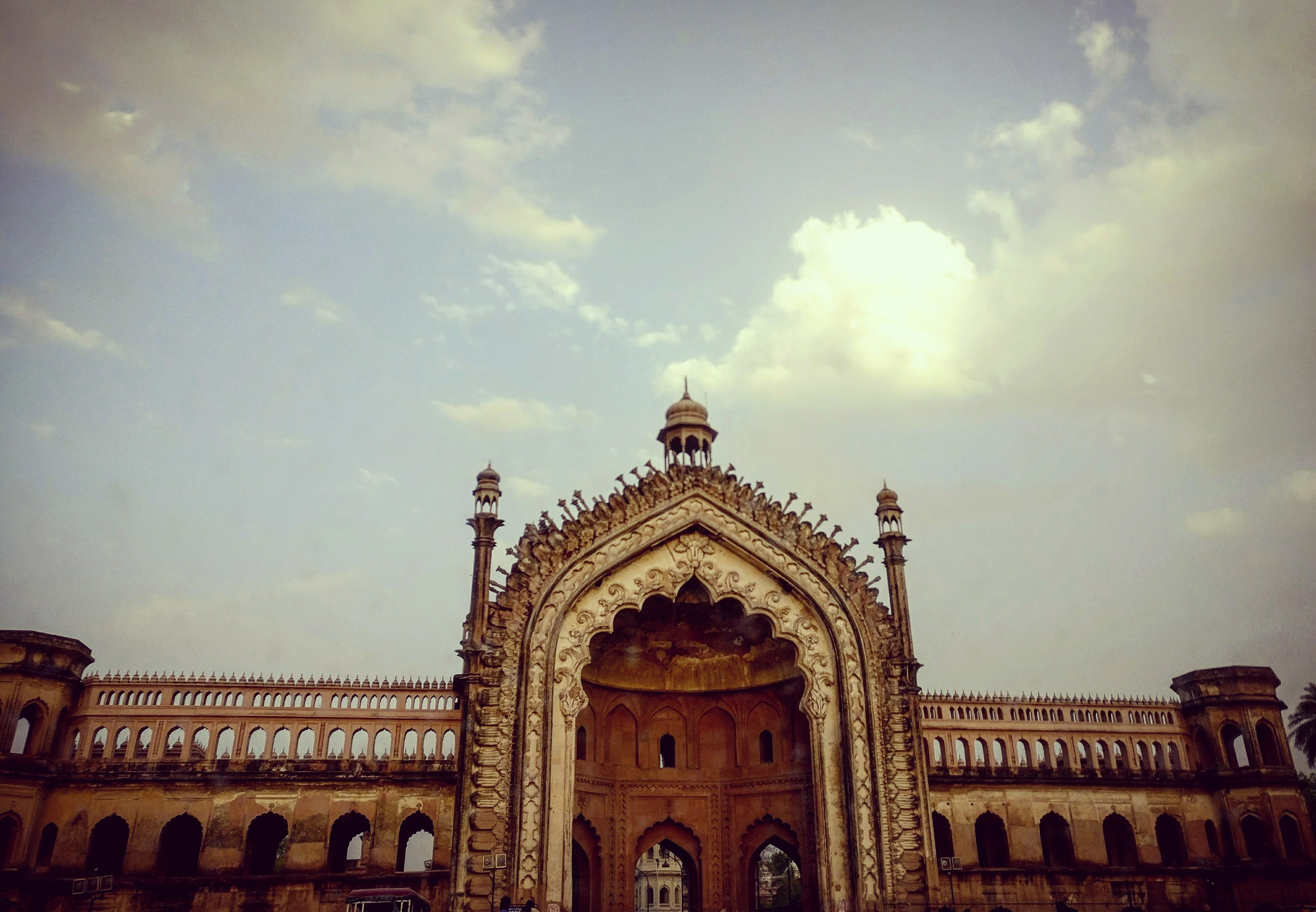
Darwaza viewed from the front

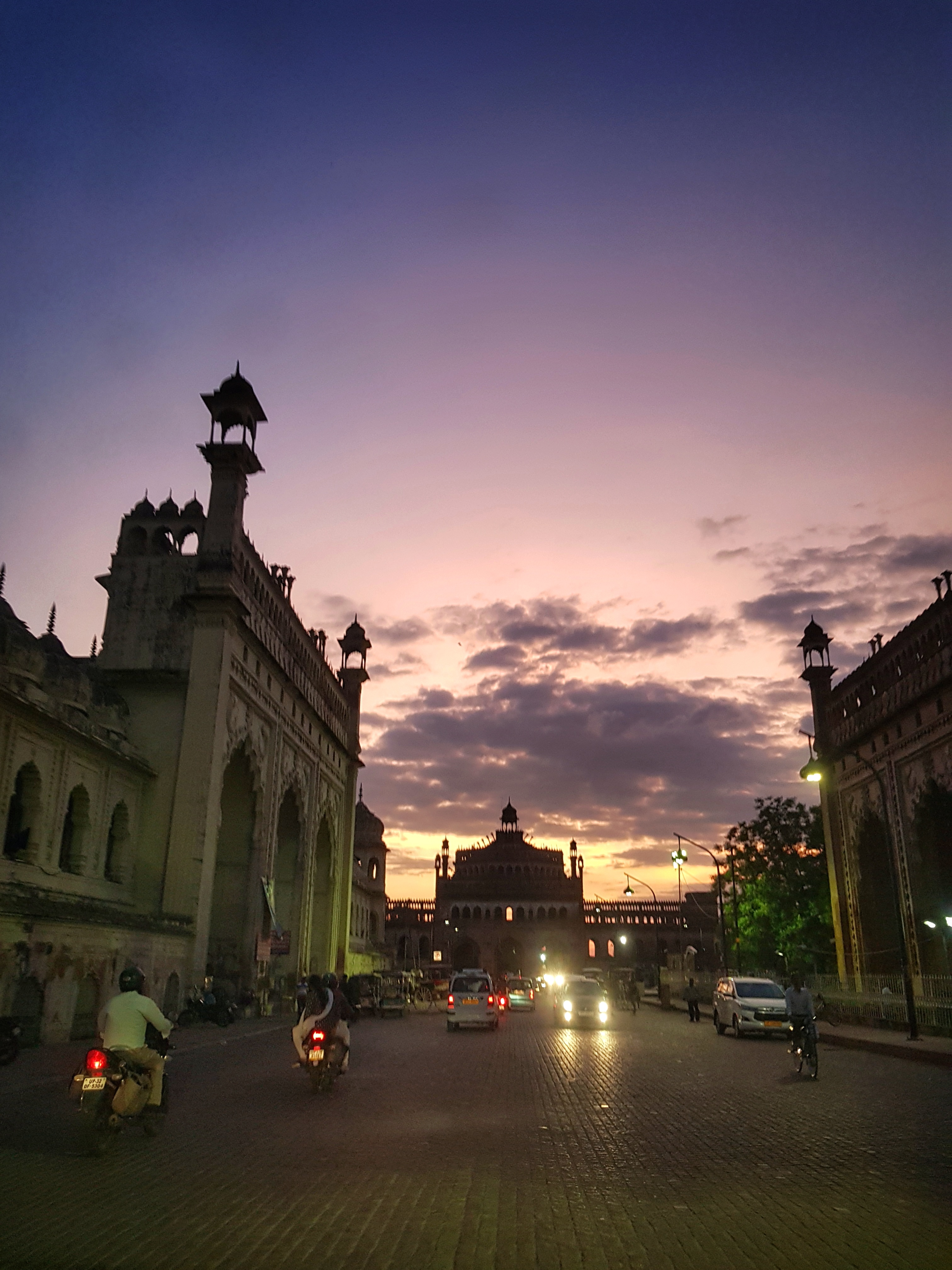
Rumi Gate (far background) and Bara Imambara

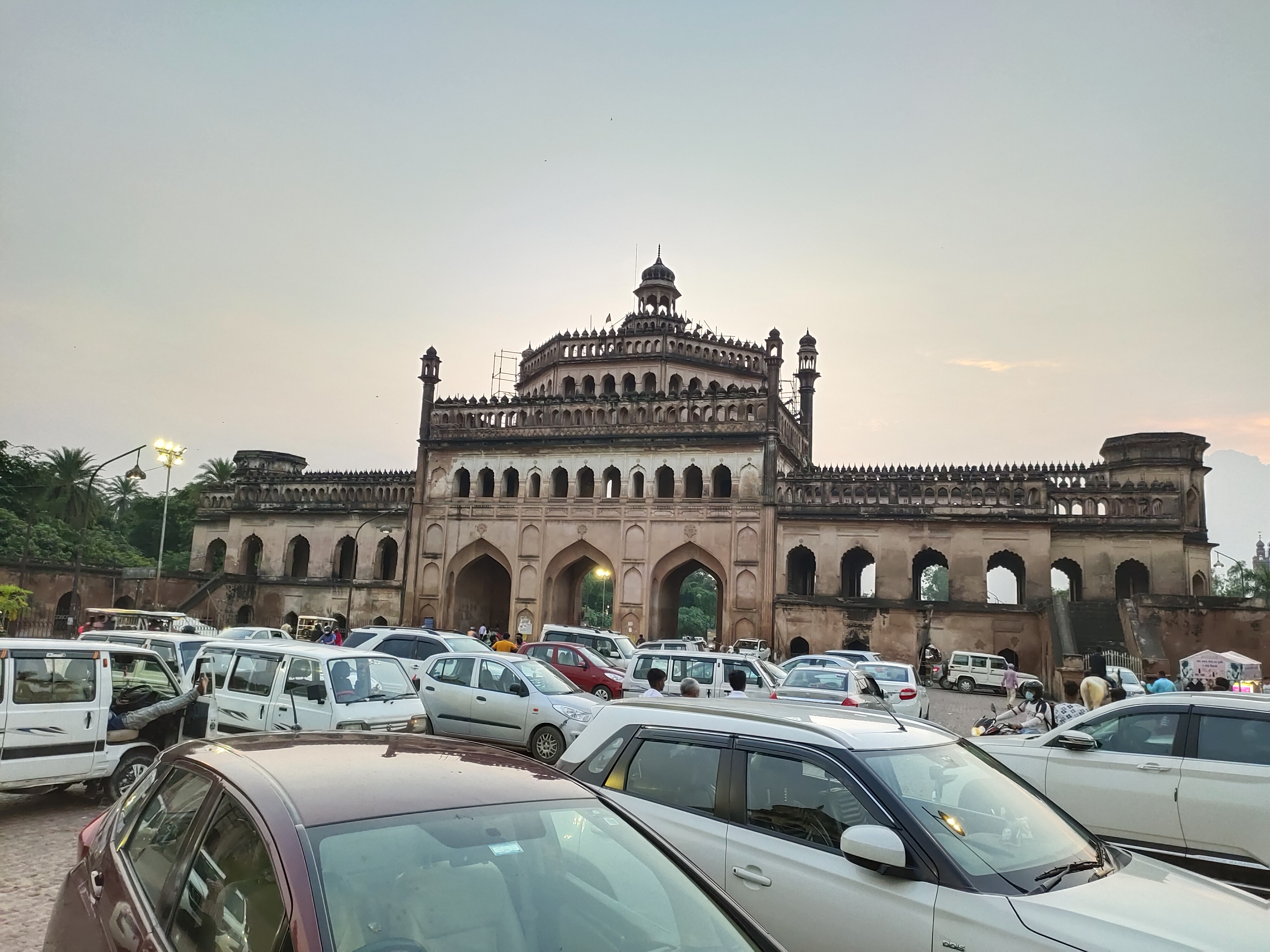
Darwaza viewed from the back

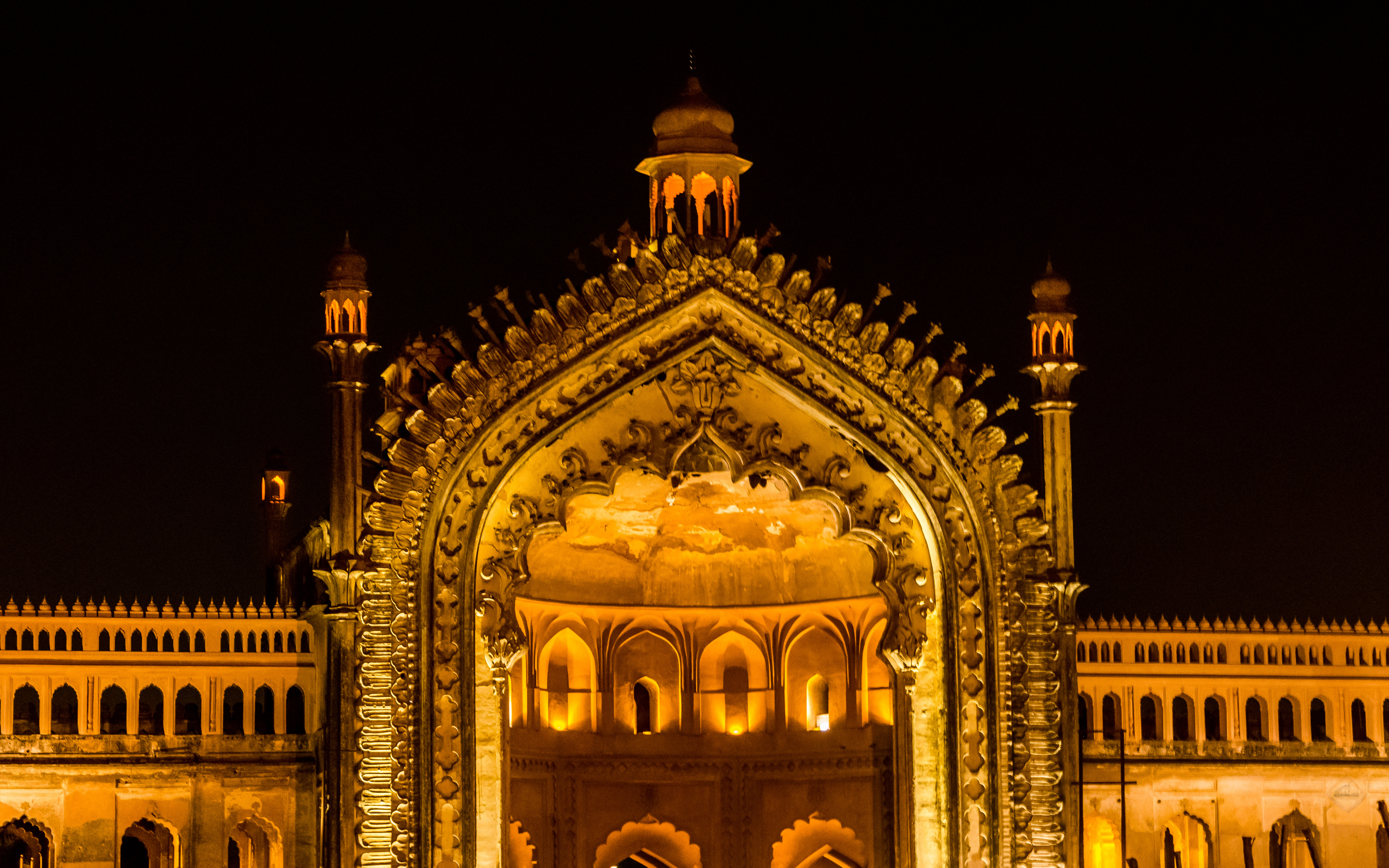
Darwaza viewed at night

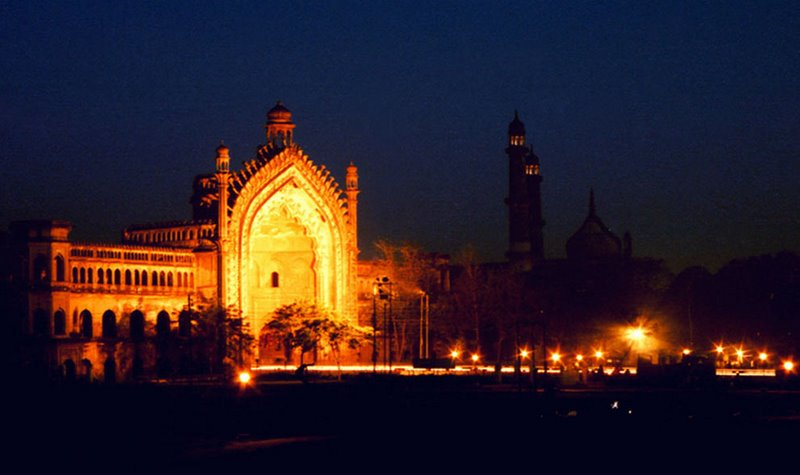

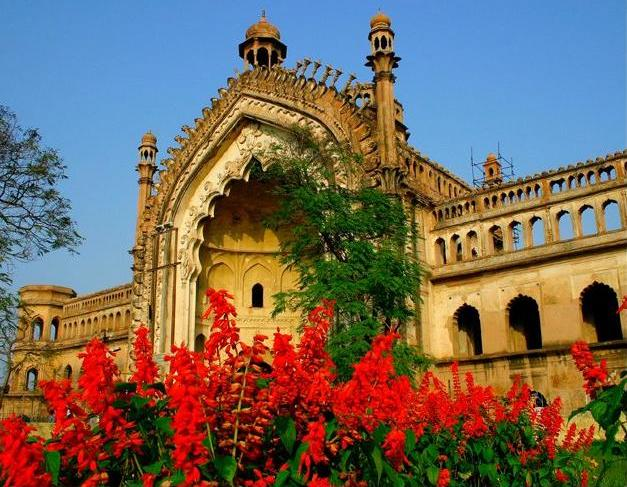

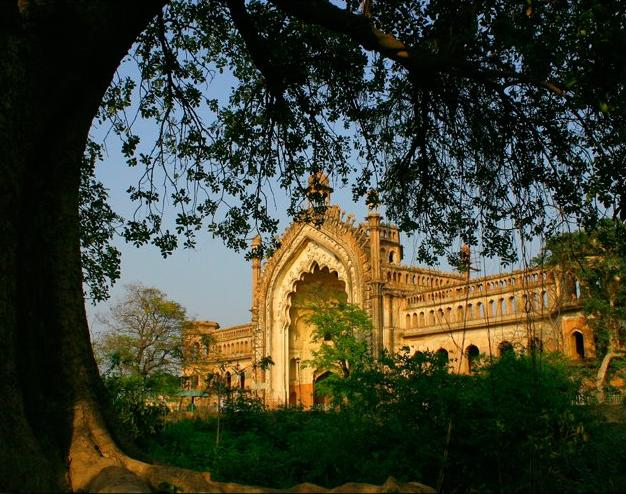

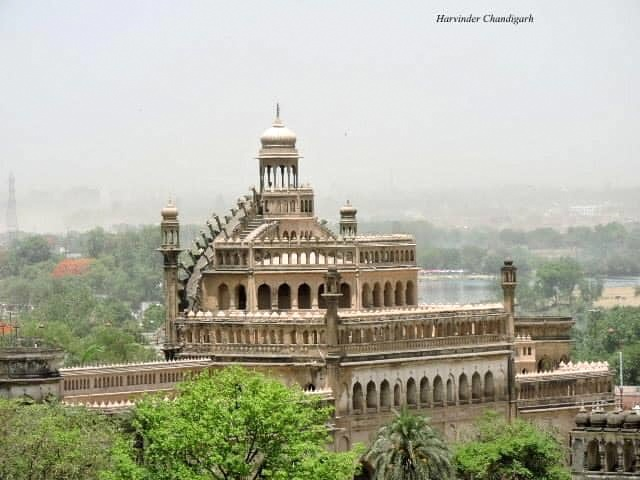
Rumi Darwaza viewed from Bara Imambara

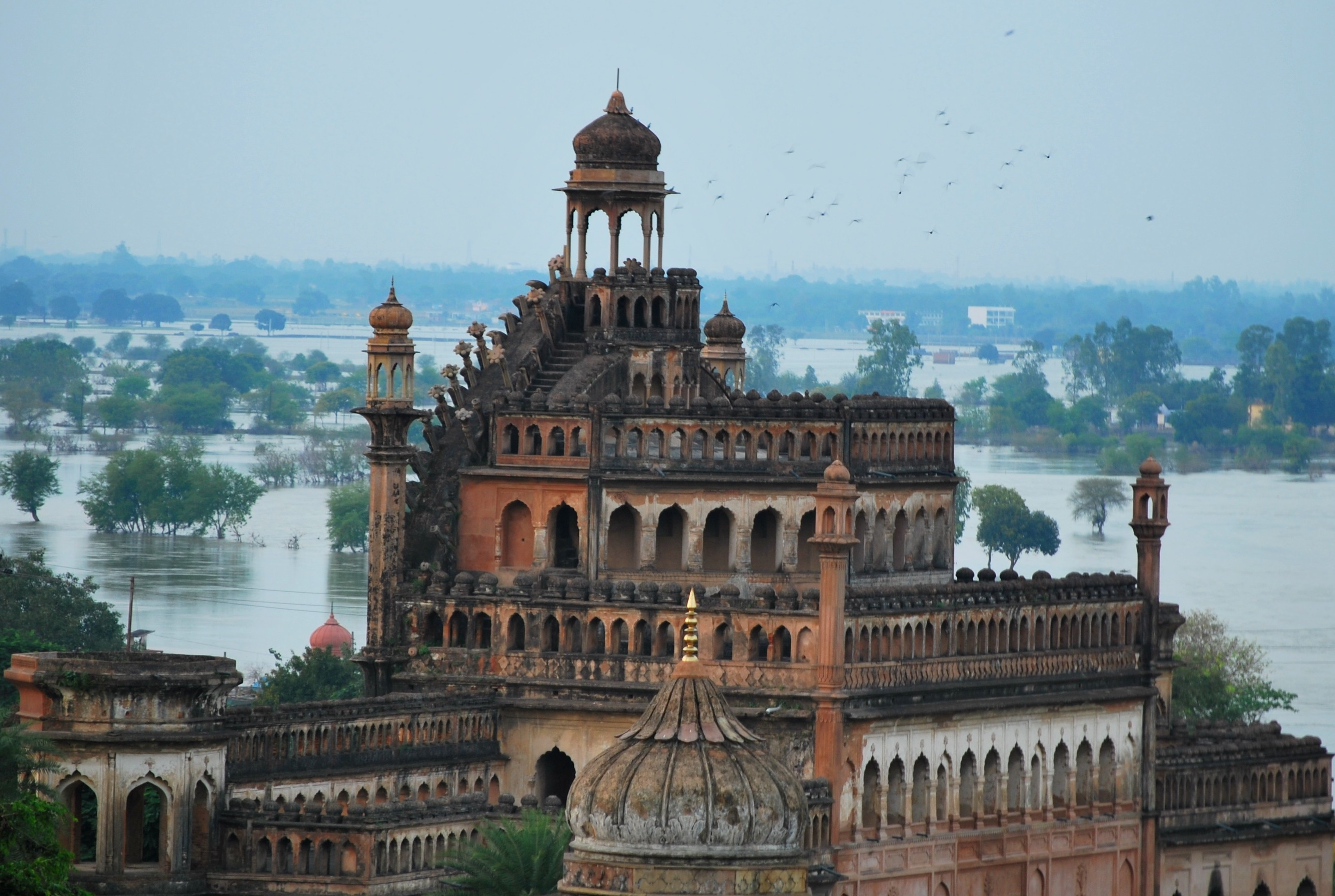

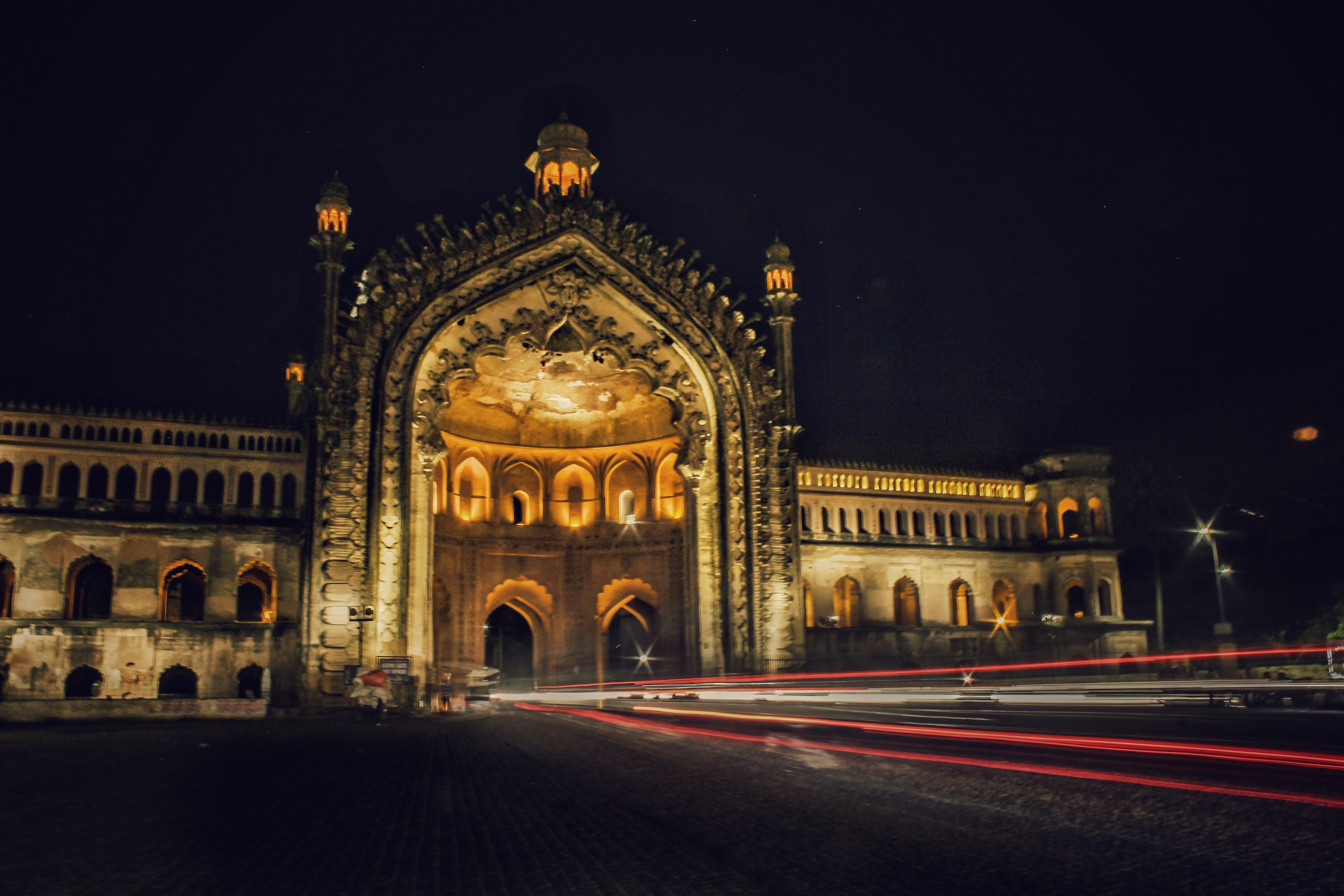
A long exposure photograph of the gate at night

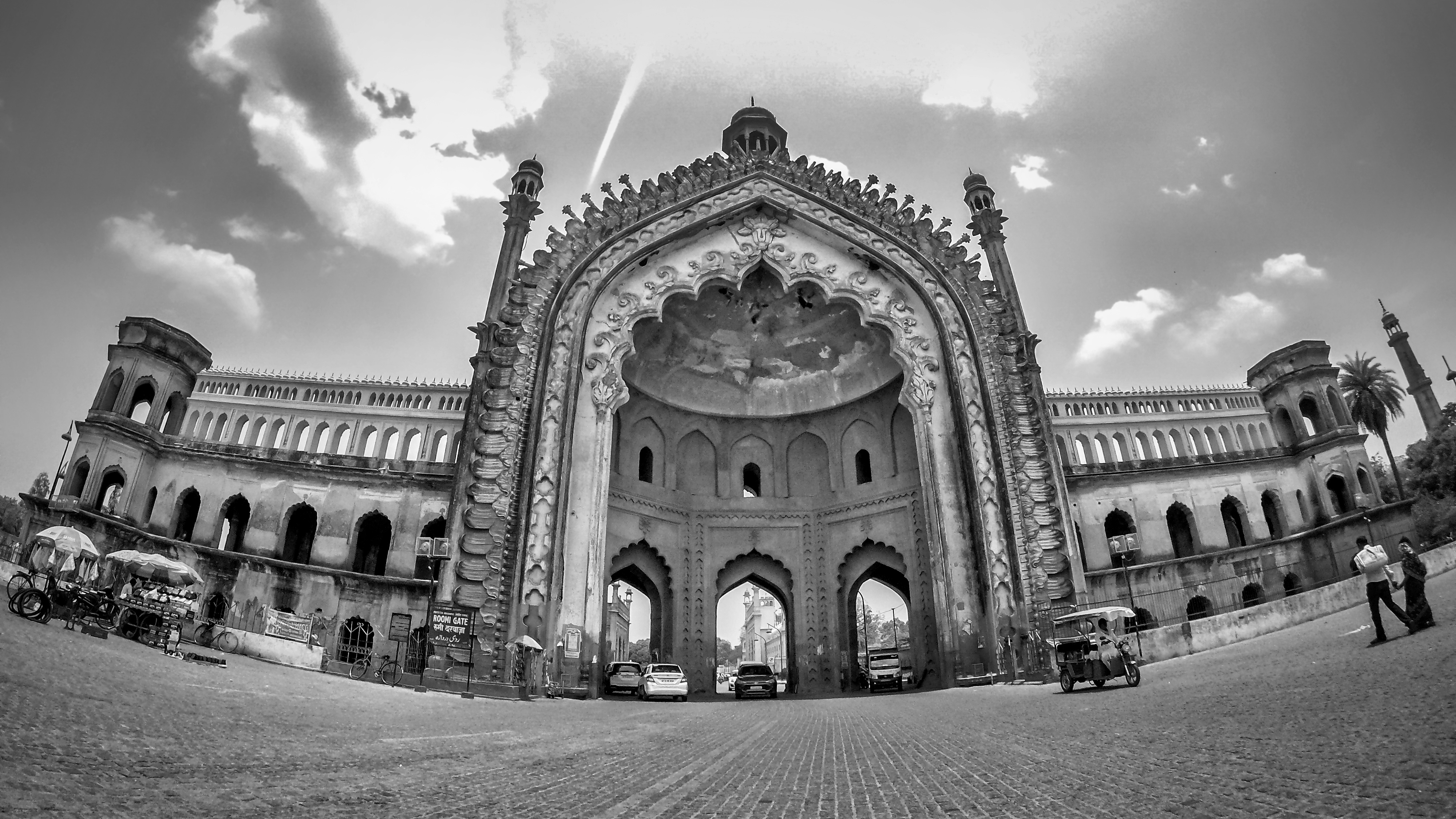

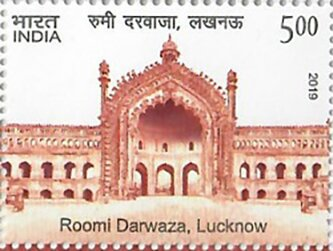
2019 Indian postage stamp depicting the Rumi Darwaza, Lucknow, from the "Historic Gates of Indian Forts and Monuments" commemorative series.

== See also ==
- Awadh
- Architecture of Lucknow
- List of gates in India
- Bara Imambara
- Chattar Manzil
- Imambara Shah Najaf
- Chota Imambara
- Imambara Ghufran Ma'ab
- Azadari in Lucknow
- Imambaras of Lucknow
- Rumi
