= Aldos-2-ulose dehydratase =

Identifiers
- EC no.: 4.2.1.110
- CAS no.: 101920-80-3

Databases
- IntEnz: IntEnz view
- BRENDA: BRENDA entry
- ExPASy: NiceZyme view
- KEGG: KEGG entry
- MetaCyc: metabolic pathway
- PRIAM: profile
- PDB structures: RCSB PDB PDBe PDBsum
Search
- PMC: articles
- PubMed: articles
- NCBI: proteins

Aldos-2-ulose dehydratase (EC 4.2.1.110, pyranosone dehydratase, AUDH, 1,5-anhydro-D-fructose dehydratase (microthecin-forming)) is an enzyme with systematic name 1,5-anhydro-D-fructose hydro-lyase (microthecin-forming). This enzyme catalyses the following chemical reaction

1,5-anhydro-D-fructose $\rightleftharpoons$ 2-hydroxy-2-(hydroxymethyl)-2H-pyran-3(6H)-one + H_{2}O (overall reaction)
(1a) 1,5-anhydro-D-fructose $\rightleftharpoons$ 1,5-anhydro-4-deoxy-D-glycero-hex-3-en-2-ulose + H_{2}O
(1b) 1,5-anhydro-4-deoxy-D-glycero-hex-3-en-2-ulose $\rightleftharpoons$ 2-hydroxy-2-(hydroxymethyl)-2H-pyran-3(6H)-one

This enzyme catalyses two of the steps in the anhydrofructose pathway.
