= Bara Imambara =

Islamic congregation hall in Lucknow, Uttar Pradesh, India

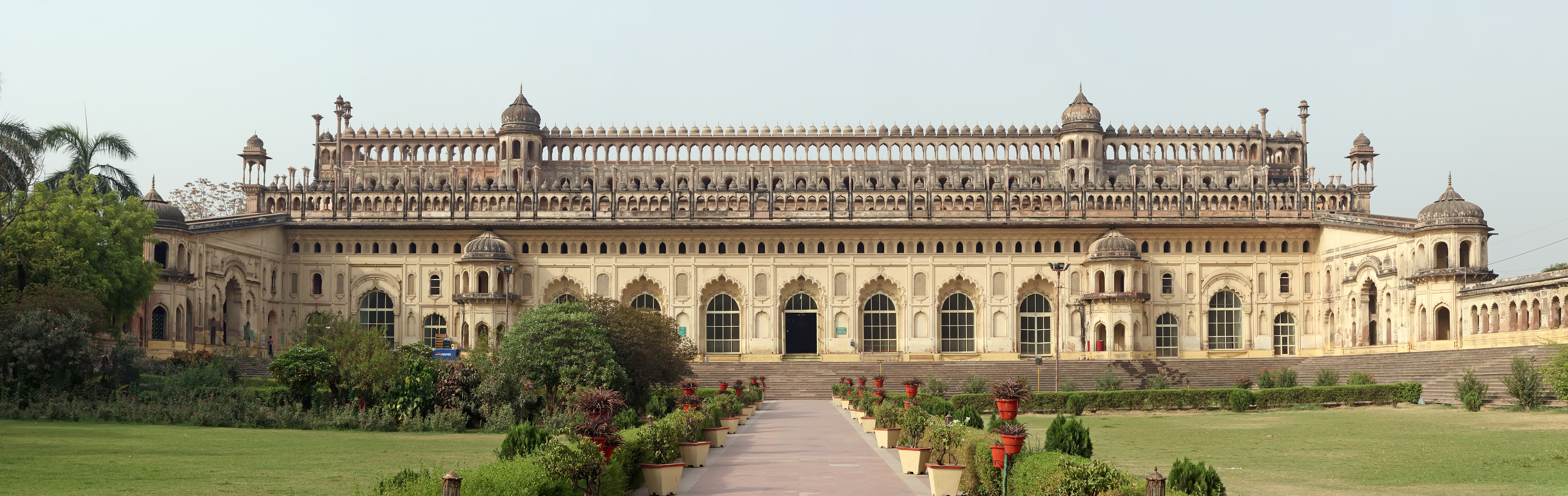
- The imambara in 2012

- Location of the imambara in Uttar Pradesh

Religion
- Affiliation: Shia Islam
- Ecclesiastical or organizational status: Imambara and mosque
- Status: Active

Location
- Location: Lucknow, Uttar Pradesh
- Country: India
- Interactive map of Bara Imambara
- Coordinates: 26°52′09″N 80°54′46″E

Architecture
- Architect: Kifayatullah
- Type: Islamic architecture
- Style: Mughal; Indo-Islamic
- Founder: Asaf-ud-Daula
- Groundbreaking: 1780
- Completed: 1784

Specifications
- Dome: Three (mosque)
- Minaret: Two (mosque)
- Monuments: Two (tombs of the founder and architect)

Monument of National Importance
- Official name: Imambara of Asaf-ud-daula
- Reference no.: N-UP-L276

The Bara Imambara (Urdu: بڑا امامباڑہ), also known as the Asafi Imambara, is a significant imambara (Note: A Shia shrine for Mourning of Muharram rituals.) and mosque complex located in Lucknow, in the state of Uttar Pradesh, India. Built by Asaf-ud-Daula, the Nawab of Awadh, in 1784, it is the world's second largest imambara, after the Nizamat Imambara.

It is a Monument of National Importance, administered by the Archaeological Survey of India.

== History ==
The construction of Bara Imambara started in year 1780, a year of devastating famine. One of Asaf-ud-Daula's objectives in embarking on the grandiose project was to provide employment for people in the region for almost a decade while the famine lasted. It is said that ordinary people used to work during the day building up the edifice, while noblemen and other elite worked at night to break down anything that was raised that day. It was a project that preceded a Keynesian-like intervention for employment generation. Construction of the imambara was completed in 1784. The estimated cost of building the imambara ranged between half a million rupees to a million rupees. Even after completion, the Nawab used to spend between four and five hundred thousand rupees on its decoration annually.

== Architecture ==
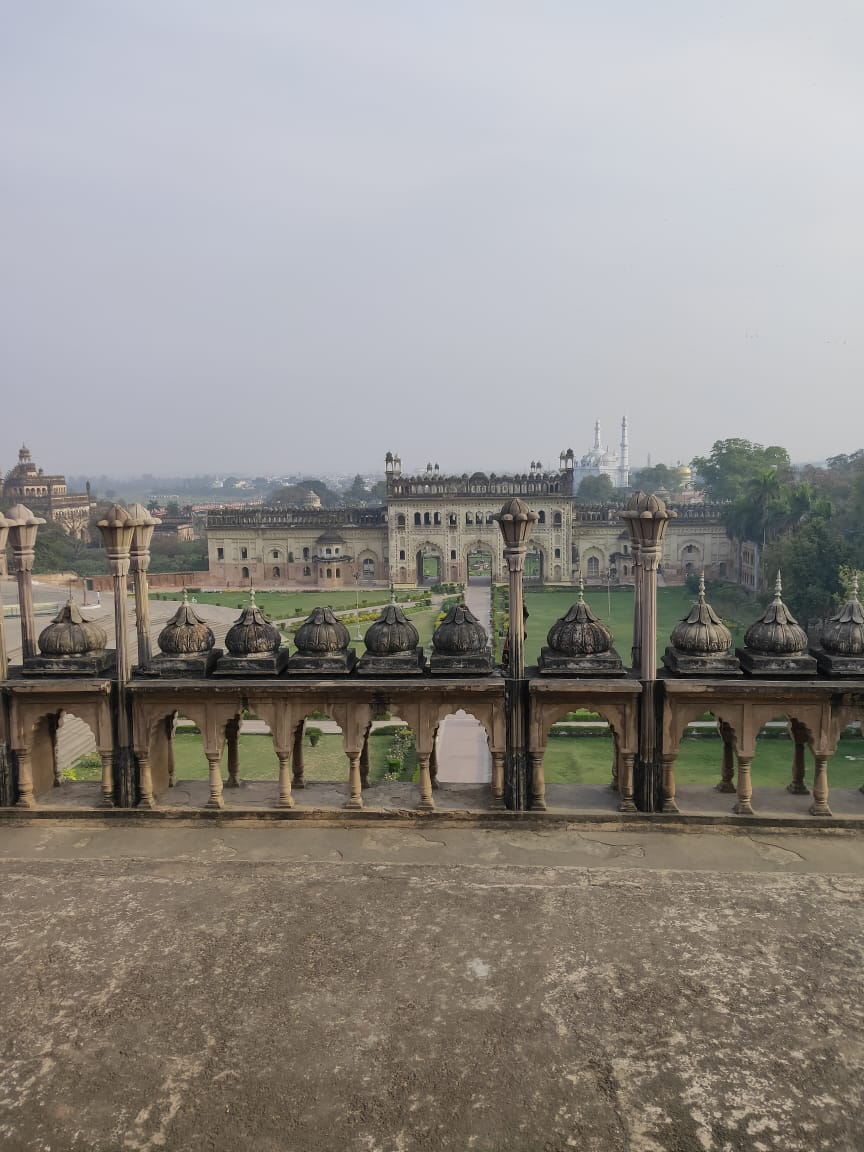
View from the roof of the labyrinth of Bara Imambara

The building complex also includes the large Asfi mosque, the Bhul-bhulaiya (the labyrinth), and Bowli, a steep well with running water. Two gateways lead to the main hall.

The architecture of the complex reflects the maturation of ornamented Mughal design, namely the Badshahi Mosque; it is one of the last major projects not incorporating any European elements or the use of iron.

The main imambara consists of a large vaulted central chamber containing the tomb of Asaf-ud-Daula. At 50 by 16 metres (164 by 52 ft) and over 15 metres (49 ft) tall, it has no beams supporting the ceiling and is one of the largest such arched constructions in the world.

There are eight surrounding chambers built to different roof heights, permitting the space above these to be reconstructed as a three-dimensional labyrinth with passages interconnecting with each other through 489 identical doorways. This part of the building, and often the whole complex, may be referred to as the Bhulbhulaiya. It is a popular attraction among the locals as well as the tourists and is possibly the only existing maze in India. It came about unintentionally to support the weight of the building, which is constructed on marshy land.

Asaf-ud-Daula also erected the 18-metre (59 ft) high Roomi Darwaza outside the complex. The portal, embellished with lavish decorations, was the imambara's west-facing entrance. The Bara Imambara is among the grandest buildings of Lucknow.

The design of the imambara was acquired through a competitive process. The winner was a Delhi architect Kifayatullah, who also lies buried in the main hall of the imambara. It is another unique aspect of the building that the sponsor and the architect lie buried beside each other.

== Gallery ==
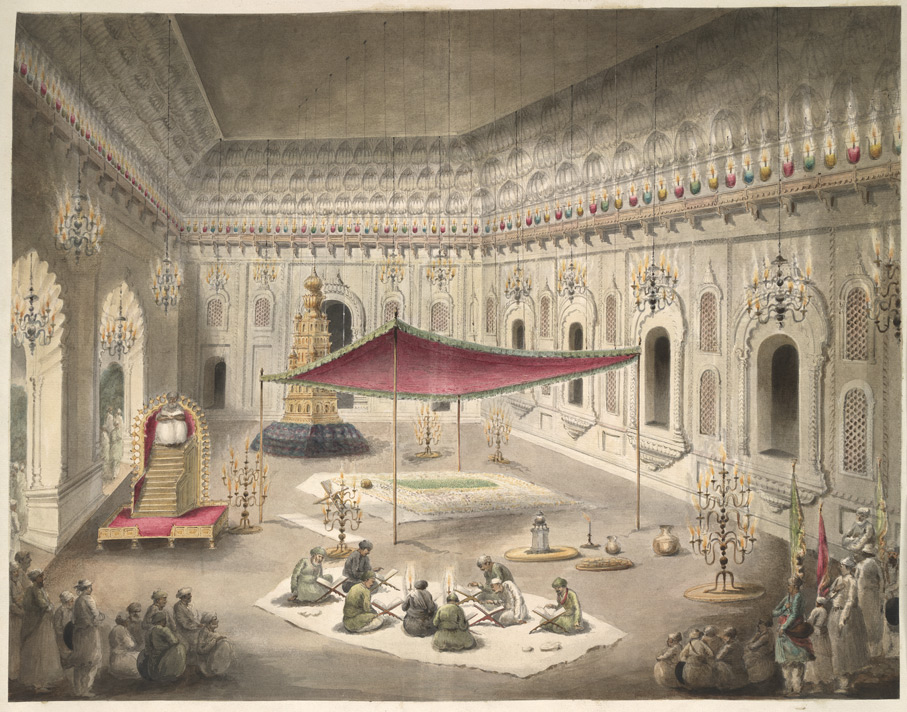
The simple grave of Asaf ud-Daula under a canopy inside the imambara; a watercolor by Seeta Ram, c. 1814–15

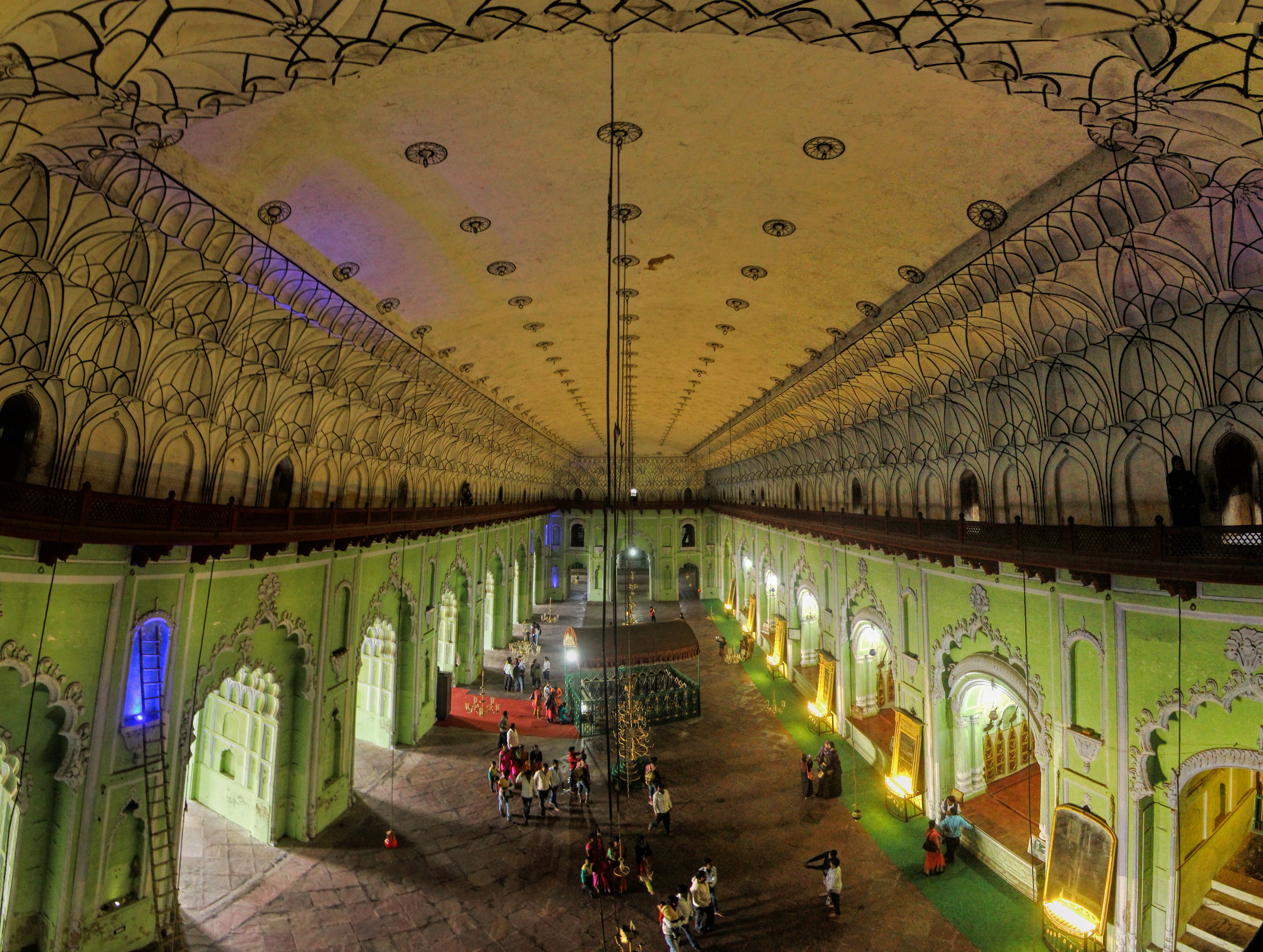
The imambara interior

Rumi Darwaza, the gateway to Husainabad Imambara, c. 1860

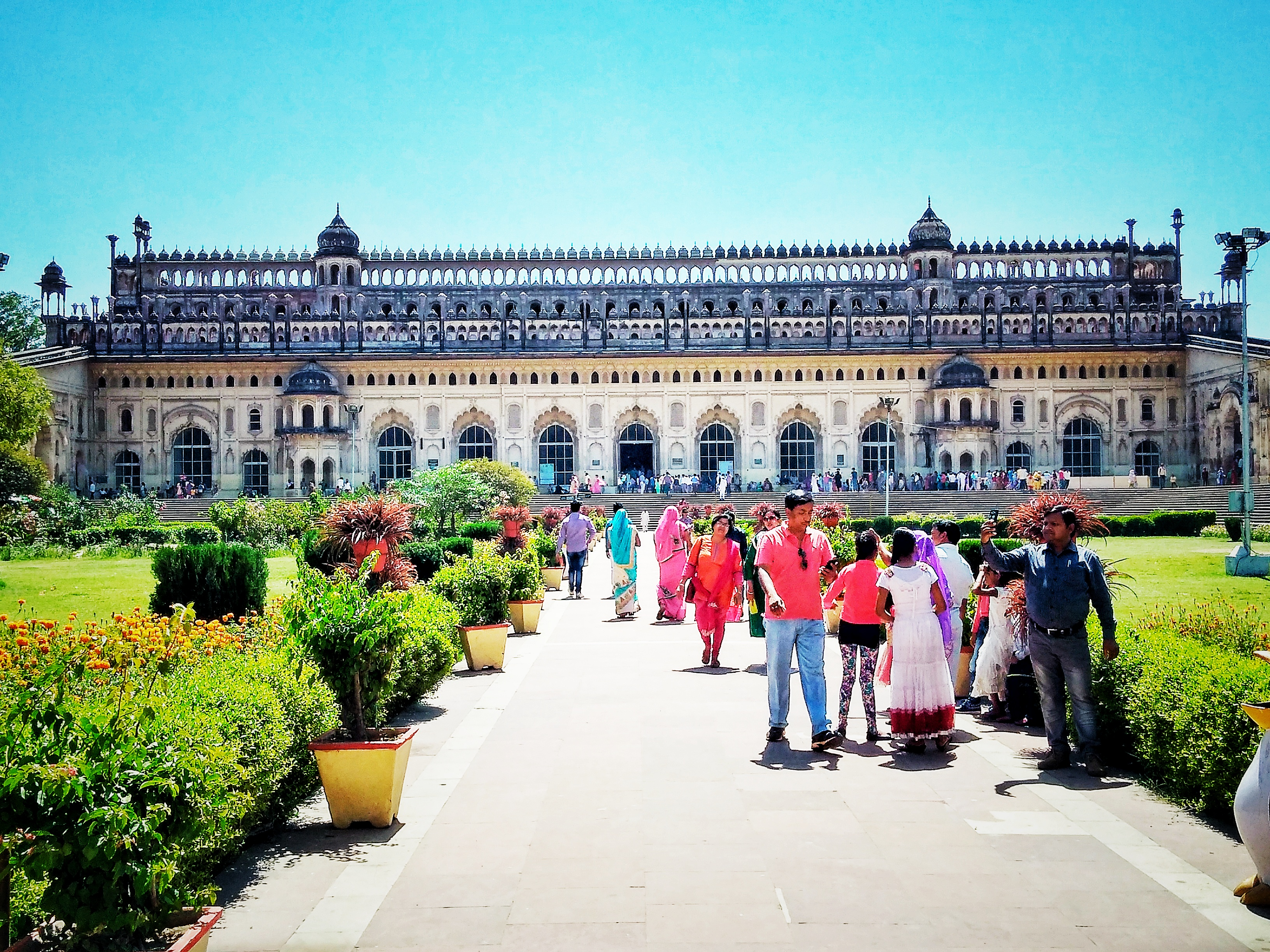
The outer view of the imambara

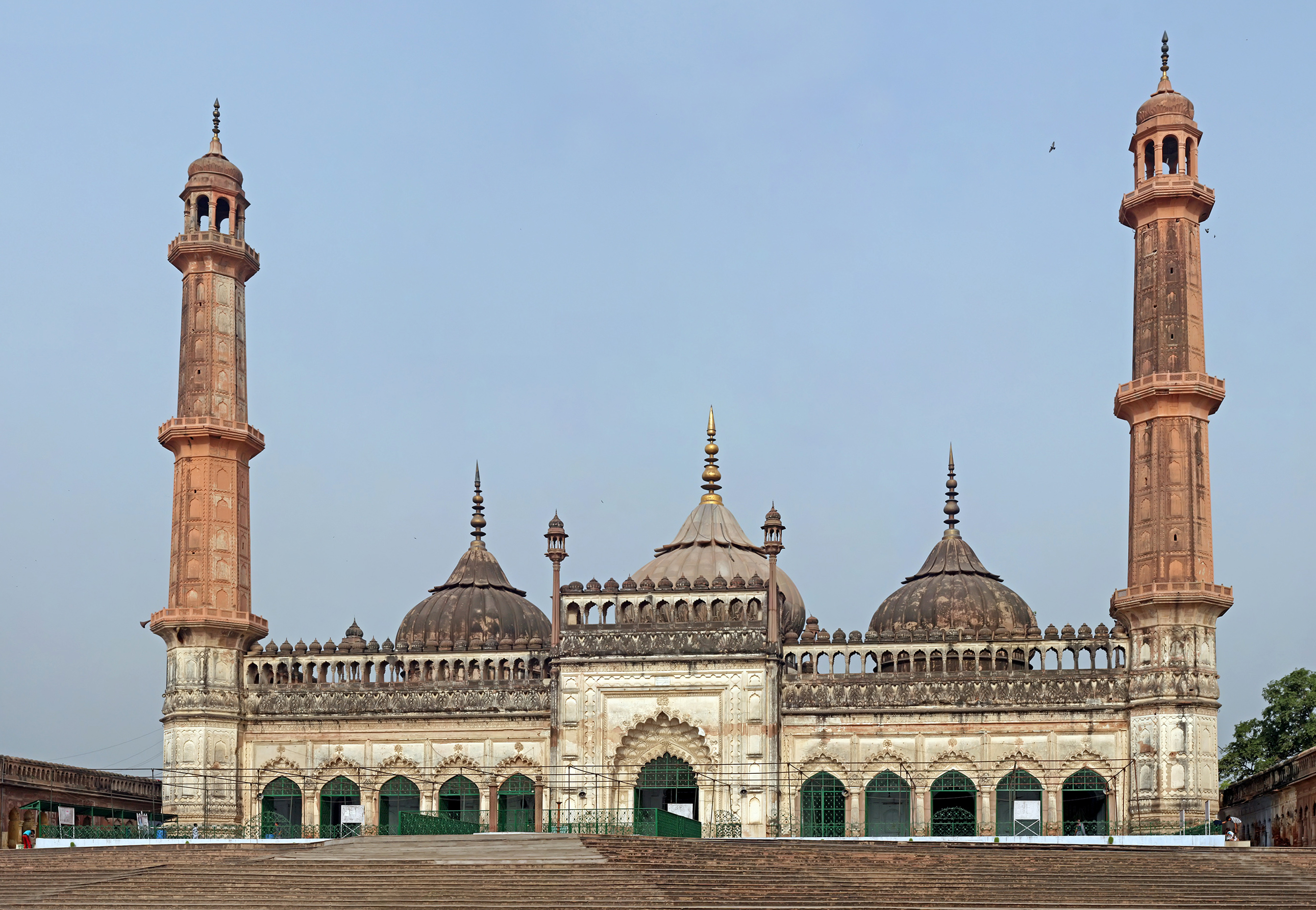
The Asfi mosque, located within the imambara complex

== See also ==
- Imambaras of Lucknow
- Shia Islam in India
- Roomi Darwaza
- Chhatar Manzil
- List of Monuments of National Importance in Lucknow
- List of mosques in India
