= Church of Epiphany, Lucknow =

Church in Lucknow, India

Church of Epiphany or Epiphany Church is a United Protestant church in Lucknow, India, that was built in 1877 in Gothic Revival style. Originally a Church of India, Burma and Ceylon parish, it was erected to address the needs of the growing Anglican community in the region. Before the construction of this church, there were two Anglican churches in the city. The church has a red-brick facade with many turrets, and an imposing five-storey front tower.

The Epiphany Church comes under the Diocese of Lucknow in the Church of North India. Rev. E.F. Bakhsh serves as the current Presbyter In-charge. Rev. J.W Adams, Rev. Iqbal Masih, Rev. R. Raymand Paul and Rev. R. Singh have also served as presbyters in the church.

== Bibliography ==
- Siddiqi, WH (2000). Lucknow, the Historic City. University of Michigan Press. ASIN B00E0R7ZKW.
