= Christ Church, Lucknow =

Historical church in Lucknow, India

Christ church
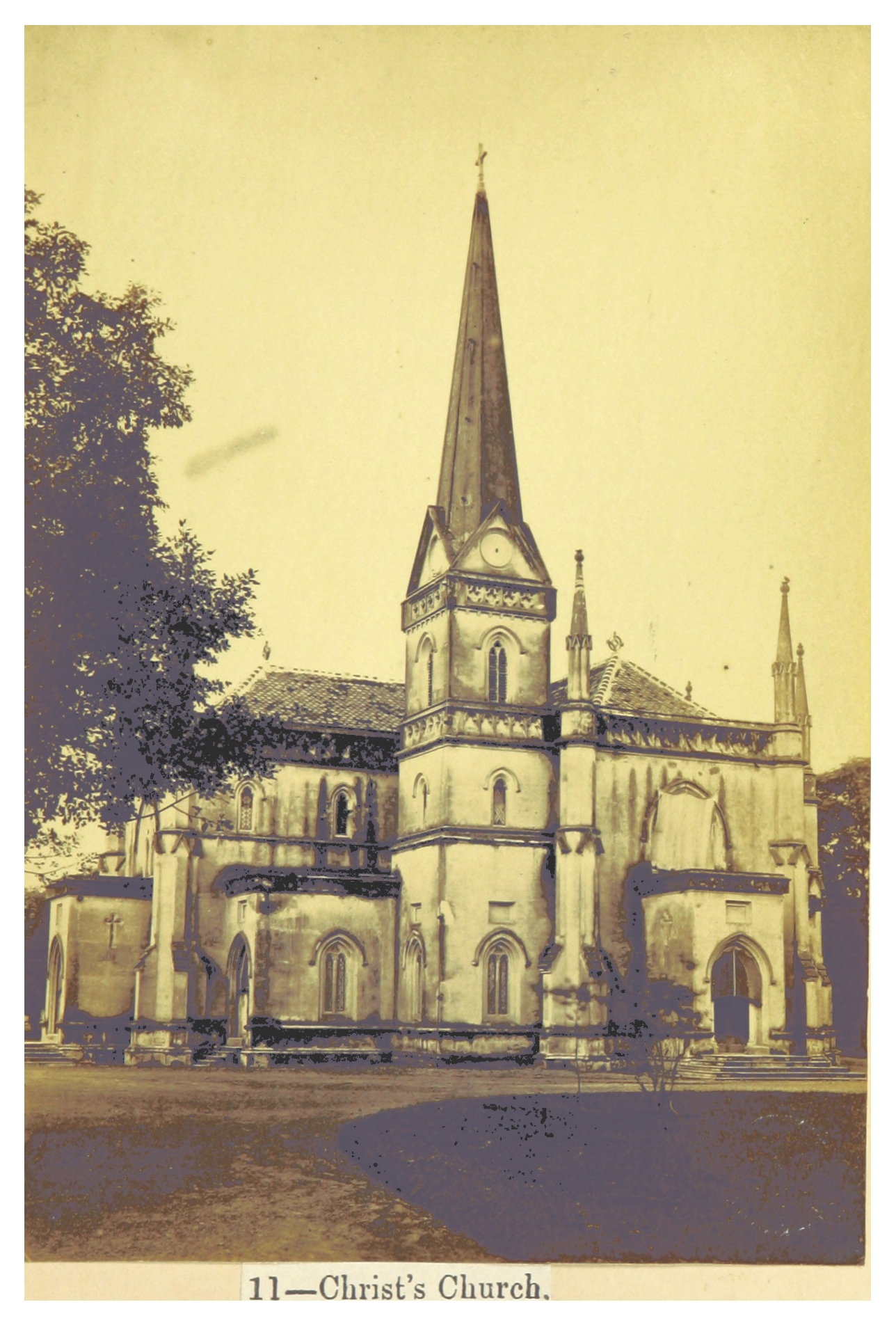
- Christ church in 1874

Religion
- Affiliation: Christian
- District: Lucknow
- Year consecrated: 1860
- Status: Active

Location
- Location: Lucknow, Uttar Pradesh, India
- Interactive map of Christ church
- Coordinates: 26°50′42″N 80°56′51″E

Architecture
- Architect: General Hutchinson
- Type: Church
- Style: Gothic
- Completed: 1860; 166 years ago
- Capacity: 130

Website
- www.ccclucknow.com/Default.aspx

Christ Church is a historical building and a school located in the Hazratganj area of Lucknow, India. It is the first English church in Northern India and the third in the country.

== History ==
The British built their first church in India at Madras (Chennai) in 1680, and it was named St. Mary's Church. This was followed by another built in Calcutta in 1770, the St. John's Church. In 1810, another St. Mary's Church was constructed in the British Residency of Lucknow, making it the third city to host an English church in India, as no other English church was built between 1770 and 1819.

During the Indian Rebellion of 1857, the church was under fire from the rebels (freedom fighters), the heaviest of which were on 31 July – 5 August 1857. The British were besieged and used the church as a store-house for ghee. At one stage they seriously considered blowing up the church but gave up the idea to avoid using up gunpowder, which was scarce.

The garden of the church was converted into a cemetery. The first to be buried there were victims of the surprise attack by the rebels at Mandiaon cantonment on 30 May 1857.

In 1860, Christ Church, situated towards the east of G.P.O. in Hazratganj, was built as a memorial to the dead of the Mutiny for their unparalleled bravery, it was originally known as the Church of England and was designed by General Hutchinson. It has the characteristic plan of construction in the form of a cross - the symbol of Christ's sacrifice for mankind. The transepts on the two sides of the nave symbolise the arms while chancel represents the head.

== Architecture ==
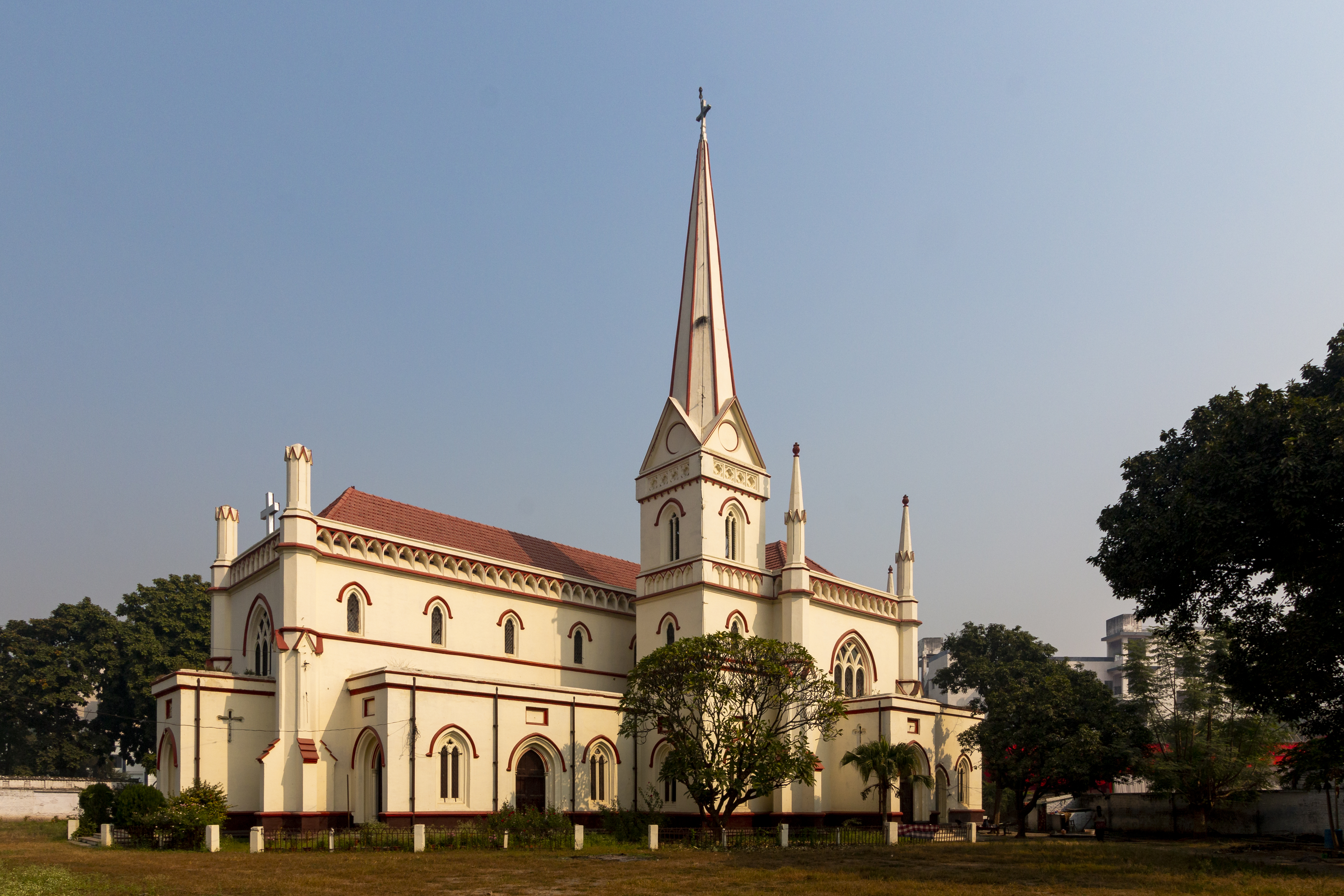
Christ Church, Lucknow

The church was built in the Gothic style with twenty steeples on its top, the church had a cross mounted over the entrance on the north. It had a capacity of a hundred and thirty people. The interior walls of the church still retain a large number of marble tablets and polished brass plaques erected in the memory of the British army officers, civilians and clergy that died during the conflict. One marble tablet in the transept is dedicated to James Grant Thomson, Deputy Commissioner of Muhamadee, who was 'murdered by the mutineers at Aurangabad in Oudh, 5 June 1857' according to the inscription. Another is dedicated to Revered Henry Polehampton. The church was enlarged and improved in 1904. A belfry appears attached to the transept on the south. The bell tower has a spire pointing towards the sky with a cross at the pinnacle. The cross is reported to have twisted due to an earthquake in 1933. The church contains stained glass trip-tych murals representing the iconic figures of the Christian faith.

The larger spire provides the background for the altar on the east while the comparatively smaller one appears on the west, above the main entrance. Both the three paneled murals have painted figures framed within intersecting arches crowning the main painting.

== College ==
Today, the Christ Church also functions as a college. It is affiliated to the Council for the Indian School Certificate Examinations. Christ Church College, which was originally a tiny Anglo Indian School, was founded in 1878 by Mr. H. McConoghey with only two students at Cantonment Road, Lucknow. The School was registered under the name of Christ Church McConoghey School Society, Lucknow under the societies Registration Act XXI of 1860 and governed by the Diocese of Lucknow C.I.P.B.C having its head office at 25 M.G. Road, Allahabad.

The foundation stone of Christ Church College at the present site was laid on 31 January 1939 by Lady Haig. For many years this school was only up to class VIII and in 1967 it had become an intermediate college and Rev Theodore Tiwari was appointed the first Principal of the Intermediate College.

In 1960 onwards two new buildings were added the Junior Wing and the Senior wing which was opened by the Lord Bishop of Lucknow. Physics, Chemistry and Biology Laboratories were set up in 1966 under the administration of Rev Theodore Tiwari in the Senior Wing. Under the administration of Mr. J.M. Ledlie the Principal's Residence was constructed within the College Premises. The Din Dayal Auditorium and the Administrative Block were constructed during the Principalship of Mr. J.M. Ledlie and were declared open by the then Governor of U.P. Dr. M. Chenna Reddy on 24 February 1975 and dedicated to the Rt. Rev. Samuel P Prakash Bishop of Lucknow. The College was also affiliated to the Council for the Indian School Certificate Examinations, New Delhi in 1975.

In 1996 the foundation stone of a new block was laid by Rt. Rev. Samuel P Prakash Bishop of Lucknow C.I.P.B.C and Prayed upon by late Rev. A.C.V. Russell. The building consisting of four floors with eight rooms on each floor was dedicated to late Rev. A.R. Yusuf by the Chairman of the Managing Committee Rt. Rev. Samuel P Prakash Bishop of Lucknow C.I.P.B.C.

A Mini Stadium with a field was inaugurated by the Chairman of the Managing Committee Rt. Rev. Samuel P Prakash Bishop of Lucknow C.I.P.B.C. The College is now a full-fledged Anglo Indian European co-educational college answering to the needs of 2500 students.
