= Chattar Manzil =

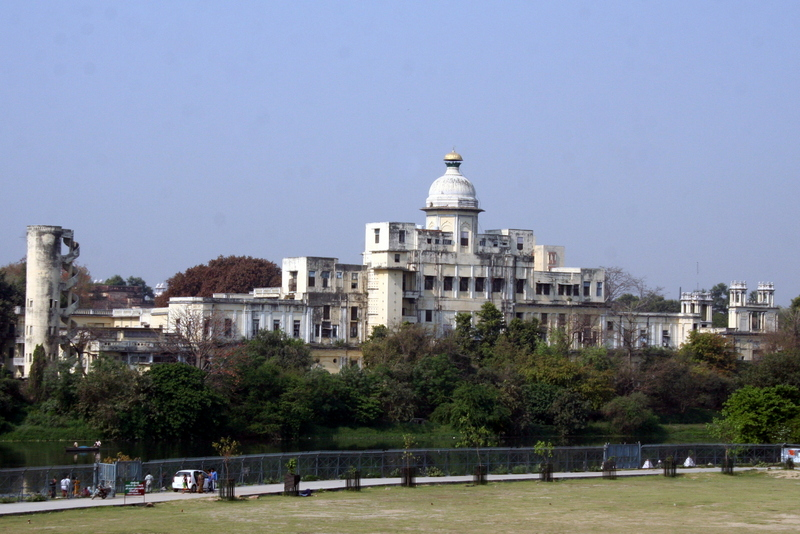
- Chattar Manzil in 2013

- Location in eastern Uttar Pradesh, India
- 26°51′31.29″N 80°55′56.62″E
- Location: Lucknow, Uttar Pradesh, India

Site notes
- Architectural style: Mughal architecture

The Chattar Manzil (Urdu: چھتر منزل, Hindi: छतर मंज़िल), or Umbrella Palace is a building in Lucknow in Uttar Pradesh which served as a palace for the rulers of Awadh and their wives.

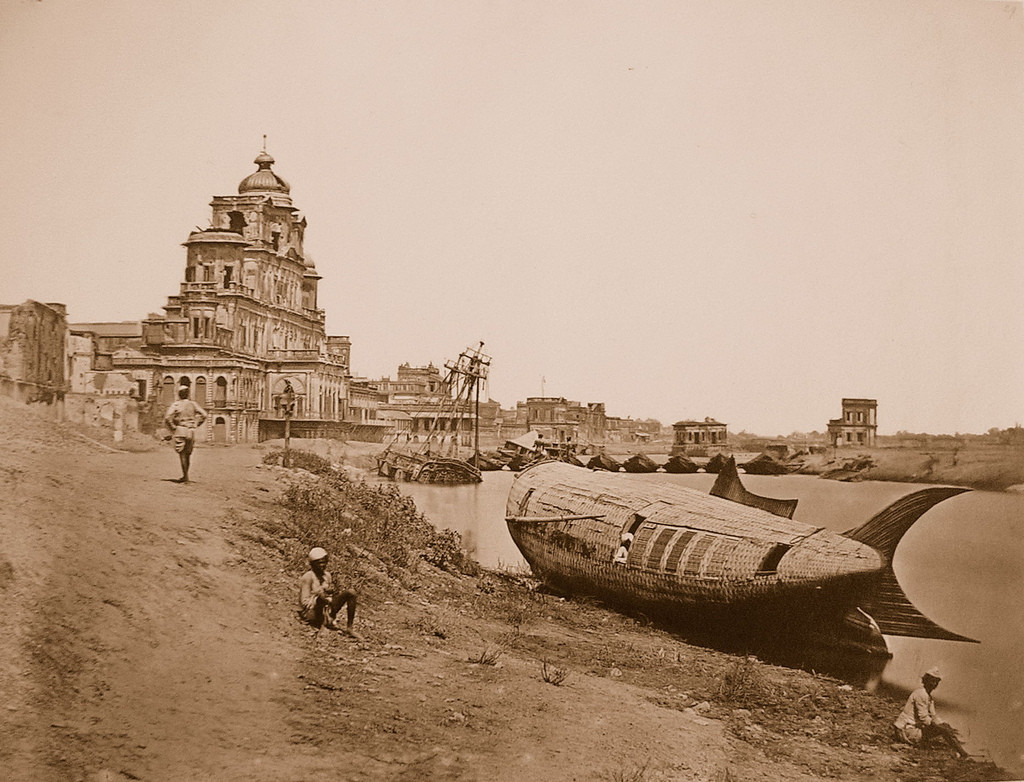
Chattar Manzil between 1858 - 1860

== Construction and architecture ==
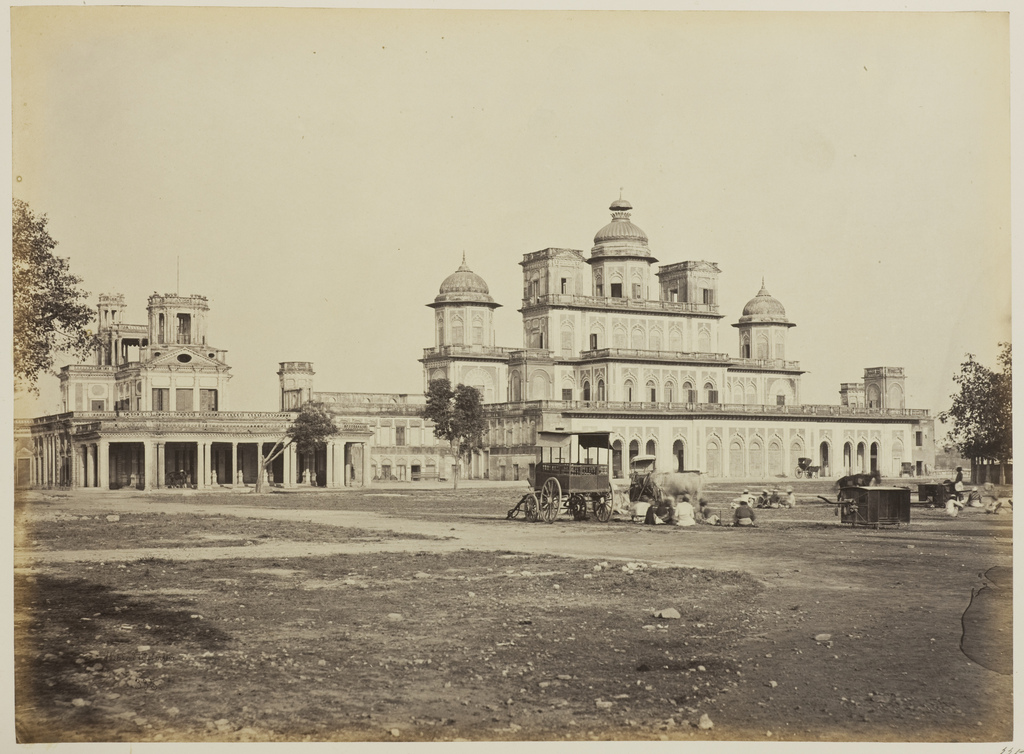
Bara Chattar Manzil (palace on right) and Farhat Bakhsh (left) in Lucknow, viewed from the south (1862) Shepherd & Roberston

It was constructed by order of Nawab Ghazi Uddin Haider and completed after his death by his successor, Nawab Nasir Uddin Haider.

The Chattar Manzil stand on the banks of the River Gomti. The Chattar Manzil consisted of a Bari (larger) Chattar Manzil and Chhoti (smaller) Chattar Manzil, however only the larger one still exists. These two buildings were examples of the Indo-European-Nawabi architectural style, even though the Bari Chattar Manzil has been altered over the years. The palaces were named after the chattris (umbrella-shaped domes) on the octagonal pavilions, which crown the buildings. The imposing building has large underground rooms and a dome surmounted by a gilt umbrella.

== Usage ==
The Palace has gone through many owners including the Nawabs of Awadh Saadat Ali Khan and Wajid Ali Shah, and the British and changes since its construction was started in the 1780s.

It served as a palace for the rulers of Awadh and their wives. Later during the Indian Rebellion of 1857 the building became a stronghold of the Indian revolutionaries.

A portion of it was destroyed by British during the war of 1857. After the war of 1857 the government had allotted the building to an American NGO which used it as a club for recreation purposes, till 1947, the Chhatar Manzil was used as the United Services Club.

Post Independence, this building was allotted to the Council of Scientific and Industrial Research which used it as Central Drug Research Institute since 1950, but now it has been vacated by CDRI.

Government of Uttar Pradesh plans to set up two museums and a library at the Palace after its renovation and conservation by the State Archaeological Department.

== Popular culture ==
From the time of the Indian Rebellion of 1857 it was often photographed by such figures as Felice Beato, Samuel Bourne, Darogha Ubbas Alli, and Thomas Rust.

In December 2013 a two-day Wajid Ali Shah Festival was organized by filmmaker Muzaffar Ali's Rumi Foundation at Chattar Manzil to pay tribute to the Nawab of Oudh.

Hindi film Jolly LLB 2 was shot in Chattar Manzil.
