= Imambara (disambiguation) =

Imambara (also called Hussainiya) is a congregation hall associated with Shia Islam, used for mourning ceremonies, especially during Muharram.

Imambara may also refer to:

- Imambaras of Lucknow
- Bara Imambara – Lucknow, Uttar Pradesh, India
- Chota Imambara – Lucknow, Uttar Pradesh, India
- Shah Najaf Imambara – Lucknow, Uttar Pradesh, India
- Imambara Ghufran Ma'ab – Rajsthan, India
- Nizamat Imambara – Murshidabad, West Bengal, India
- Hooghly Imambara – Hooghly, West Bengal, India
- Imambara Zadibal – Srinagar, Jammu and Kashmir, India
- Hussaini Dalan – Dhaka, Bangladesh
