= Mannat =

Wish and vow in the India subcontinent

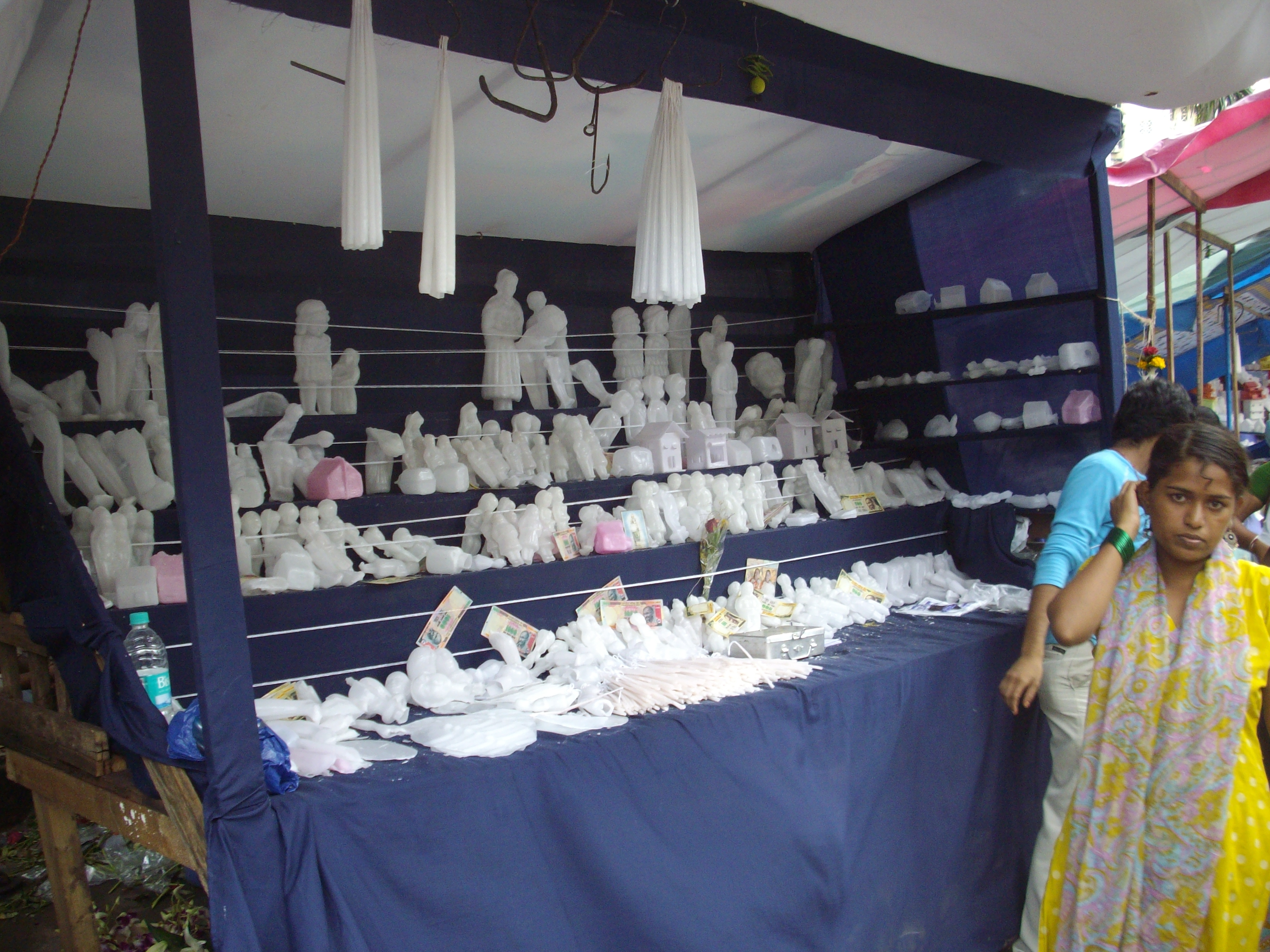
Individuals visiting the Basilica of Our Lady of the Mount buy votive candles from street vendors. Lighting them inside the church, they ask St Mary to make their mannat come true.

In the Indian subcontinent, mannat (Hindi: मन्नत, Urdu: منّت) is a wish that one desires to come to fruition and the vow one makes to a deity or saint after his/her wish comes true.

The word comes from the Persian language in which mannat (منّت), means "grace, favour, or praise". The word was first used at dargahs, Sufi Islamic shrines of deceased fakirs.

South Asians often make pilgrimages to houses of worship that are associated with the fulfillment of one's mannat; while these sites have a certain religious affiliation, people of all faiths visit them, reflecting a historical composite culture of the Indian subcontinent. Devotees make a promise to do a good work for God when their mannat is fulfilled, such as distributing sweets at the house of worship, giving alms to feed the poor, and resolving to pray every day. Examples of mannat asked for at various religious sites include childless couples praying for a baby, women praying for their husbands to find a good job, etc.

== Sites frequented for Mannat ==
- Ajmer Sharif Dargah in India
- Basilica of Our Lady of the Mount, Bandra in Bombay (Mumbai), India.
- Imambaras of Lucknow, India
- Pakka Pul Pir in India
- Shrine of Baba Farid in Pakistan.
- Siddhivinayak Temple, Mumbai, India.

== See also ==
- Sacred gardens
- Lourdes Grotto
