= Chota Imambara =

Monument in Lucknow, Uttar Pradesh, India

Coordinates: 26.873784°N 80.904409°E

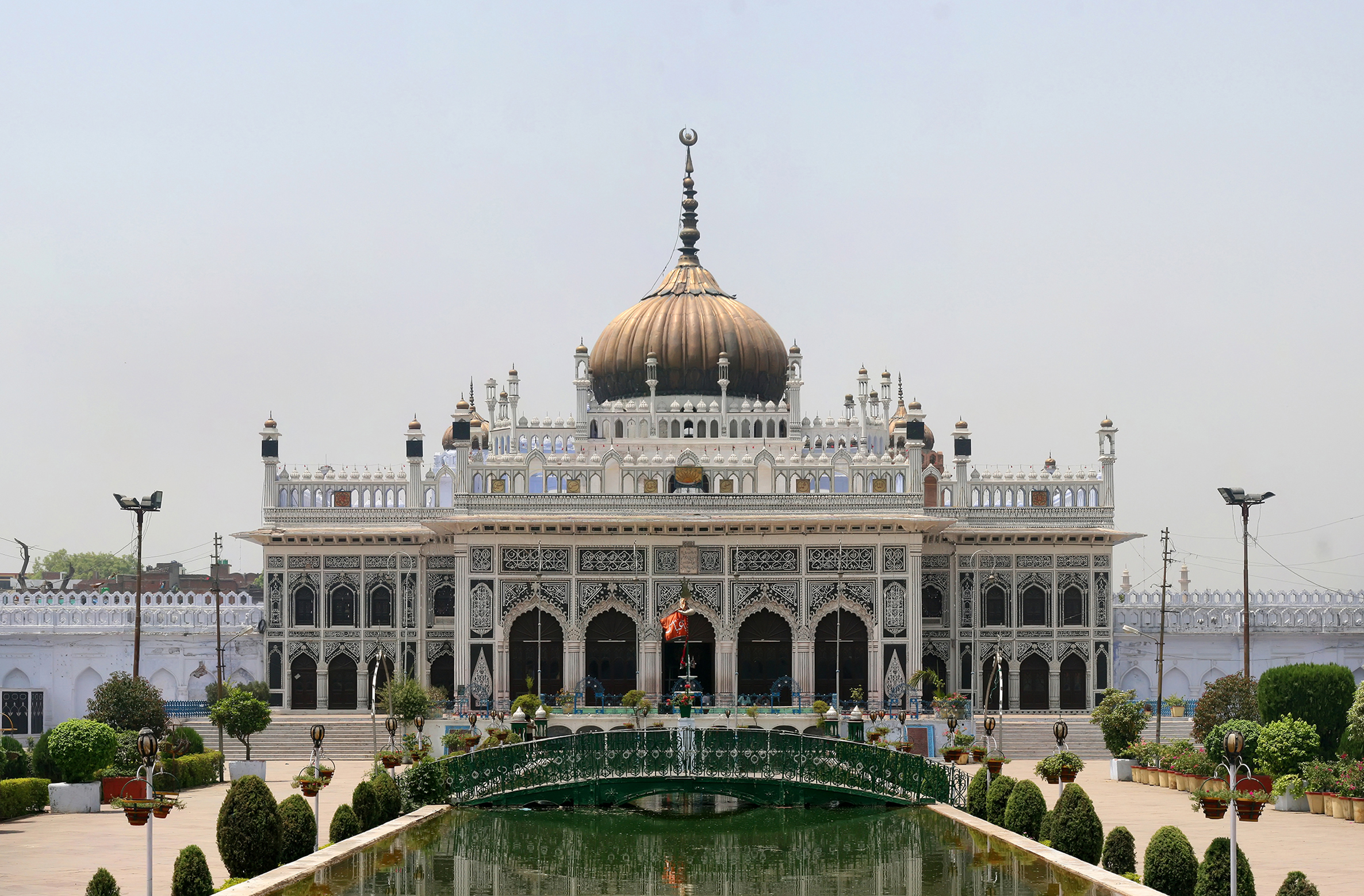
Imambara Hussainabad Mubarak, Lucknow

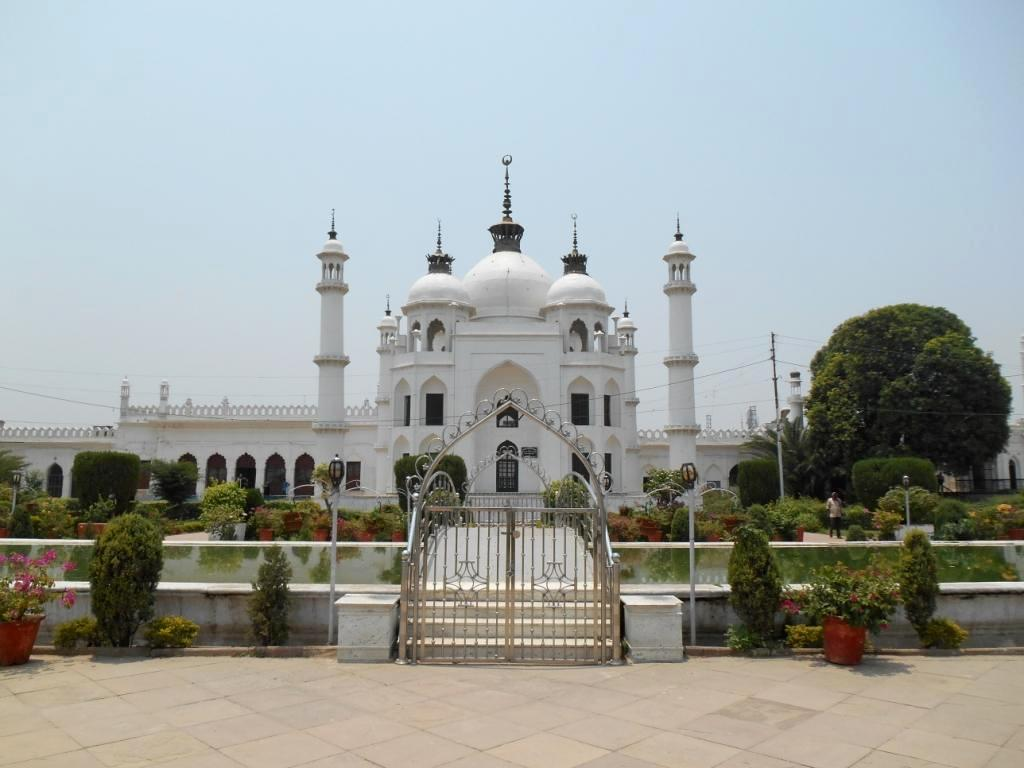
Tomb of Princess Asiya Begum, Daughter of King Mohammad Ali Shah Bahadur (3rd King of Awadh). Taj Mahal replica. It was also made for pushing the body of Muhhamad Ali Shah and his mother.

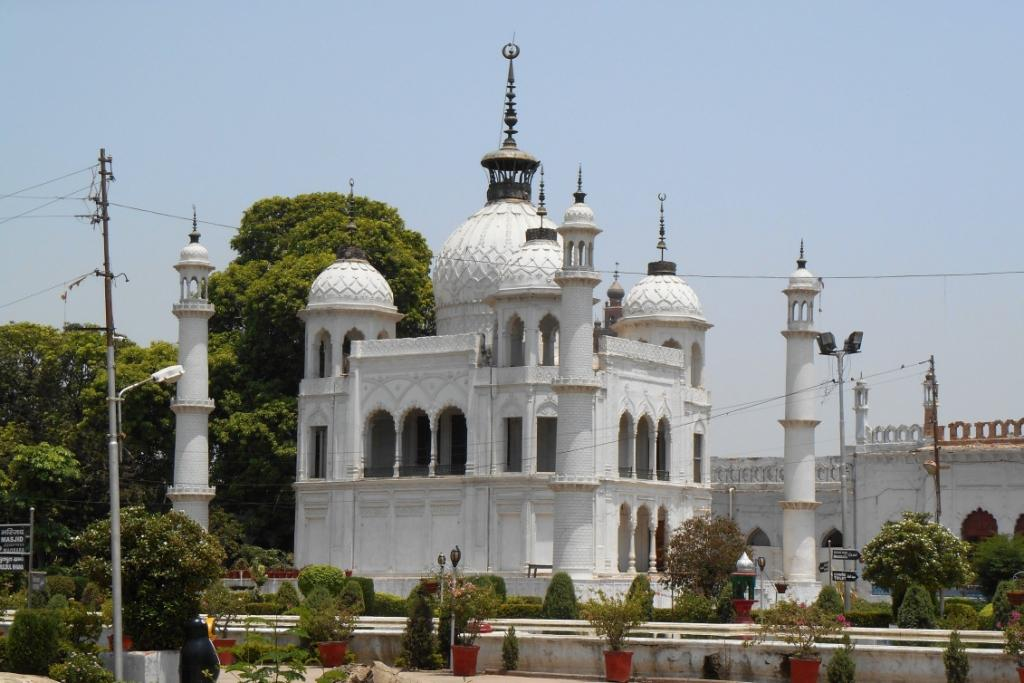
Treasury or opposite building

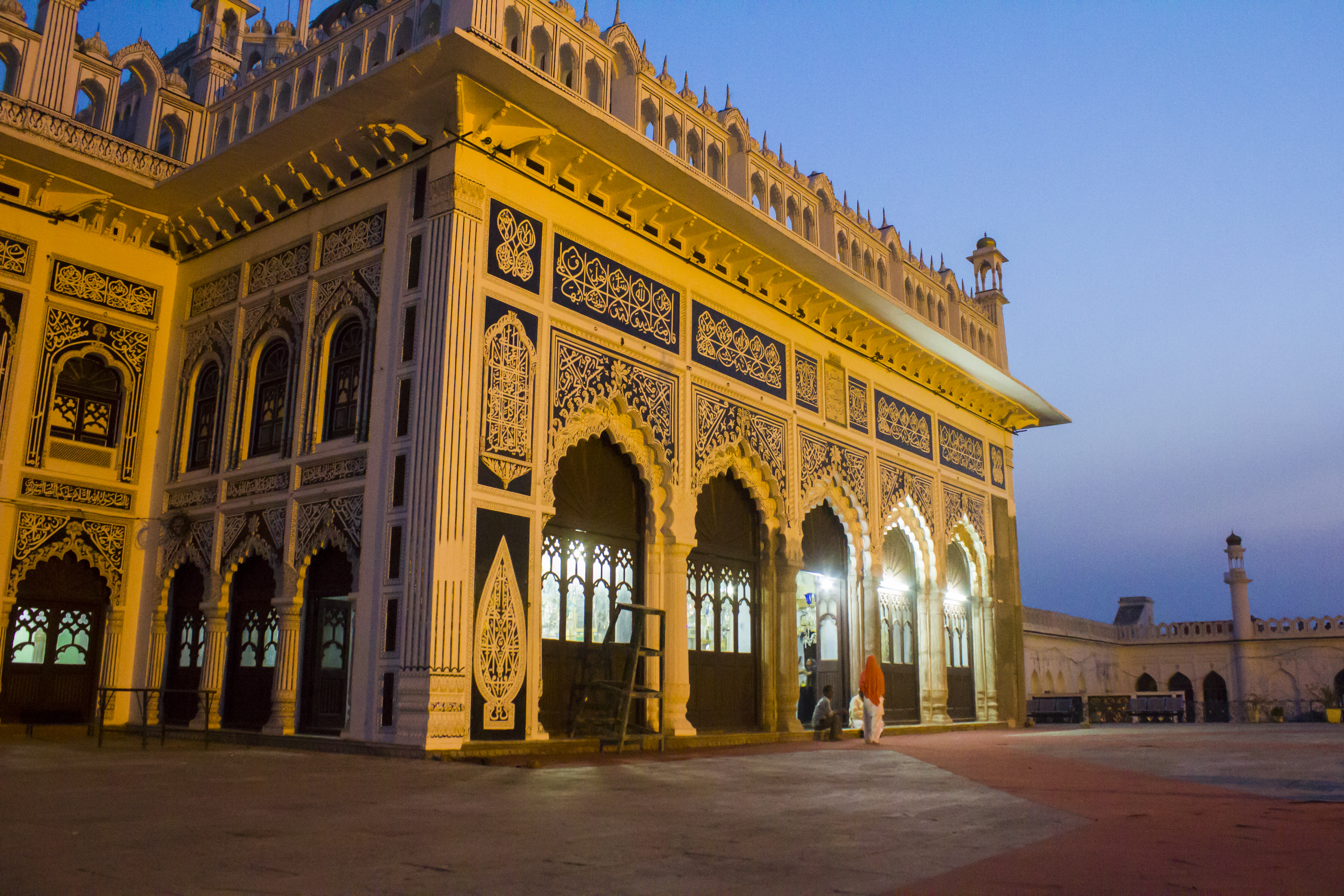
Imambara Hussainabad Mubarak in Lucknow

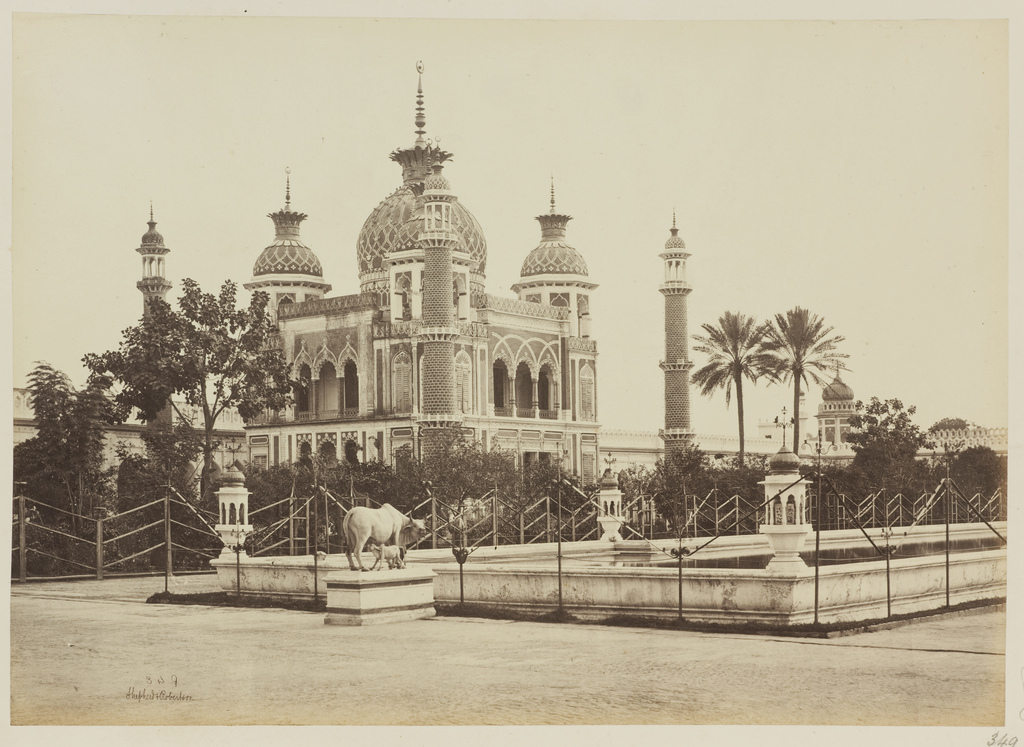
Jawab opposite the tomb of Princess Asiya Begum in the Husainabad Imambara complex (1862)

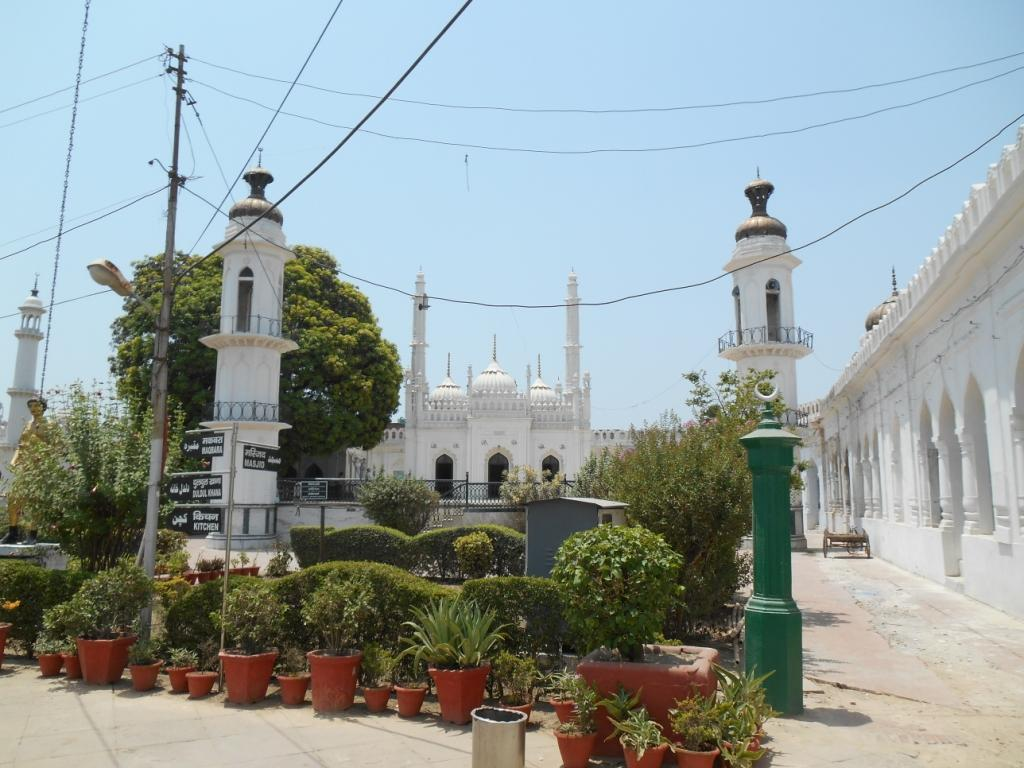
Husainabad Mosque

Imambara Hussainabad Mubarak, popularly known as Chhota Imambara, is a monument located in the city of Lucknow, Uttar Pradesh, India. It took 54 years to build. Built as an imambara, or a congregation hall for Shia Muslims, by Muhammad Ali Shah, the Nawab of Awadh in 1838, it was to serve as a mausoleum for himself and his mother, who is buried beside him.

The significance of Panjetan, the holy five, is emphasized with five main doorways. This Imambara consists of two halls and a Shehnasheen (a platform where the Zarih of Imam Husain is kept.) Zarih is the replica of that protective grill or structure which is kept on the grave of Imam Husain at Karbala, Iraq. The large green and white bordered hall of Azakhana is richly decorated with chandeliers and a good number of crystal glass lamp-stands. In fact, it was for this profuse decoration that the Imambara was referred by European visitors and writers as The Palace of Lights. The exterior is very beautifully decorated with Quranic verses in Islamic calligraphy .

== Overview ==
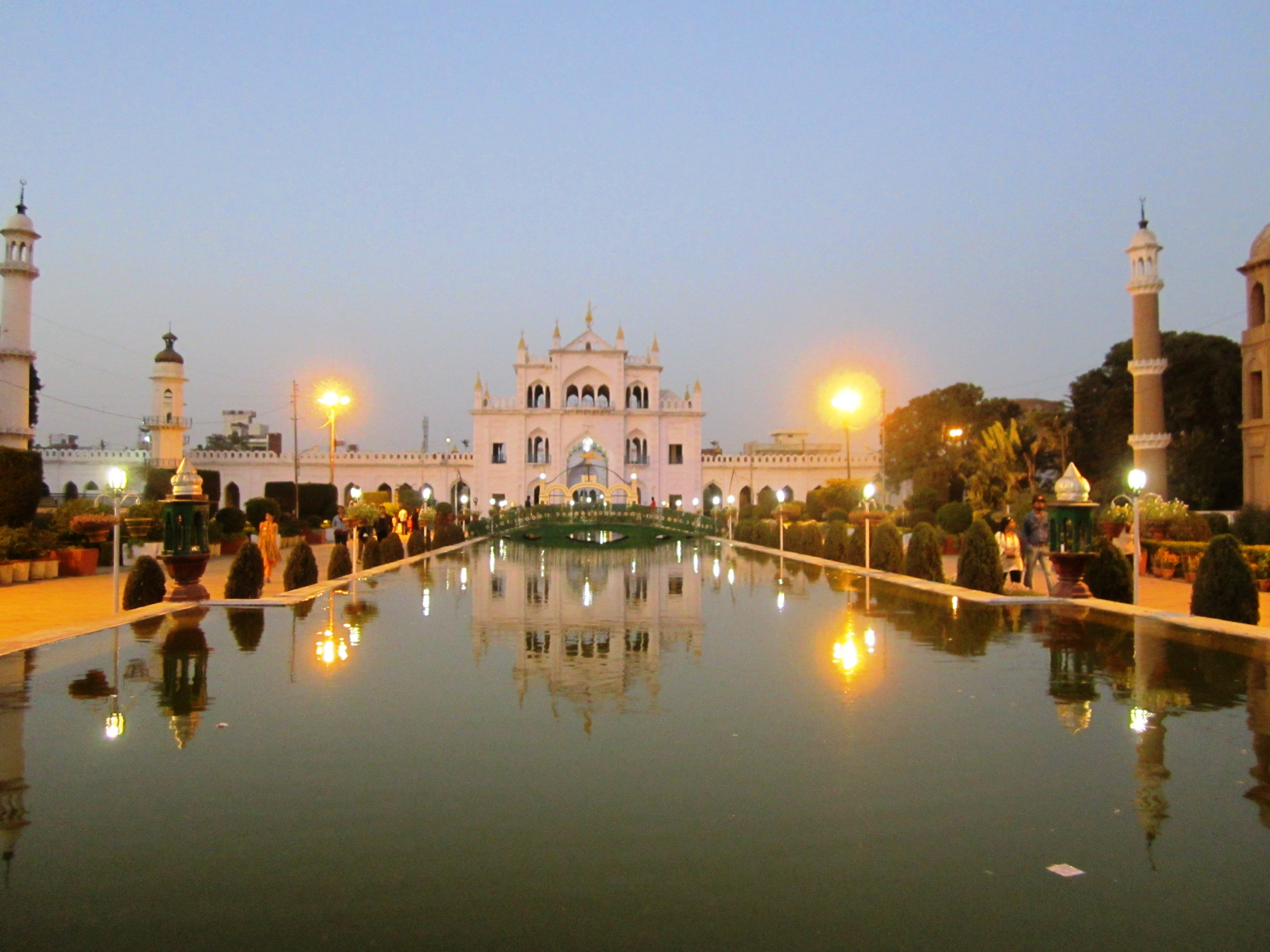
Naubat Khana or ceremonial gateway at Imambara Hussainabad Mubarak

The Chhota Imambara stands to the west of Bara Imambara and an imposing gateway known as Rumi Darwaza. The building is also known as the Palace of Lights because of its decorations and chandeliers during special festivals, like Muharram.

The chandeliers used to decorate the interior of this building were brought from Belgium. Also housed within the building, is the crown of Muhammad Ali Shah and ceremonial tazias. Thousands of labourers worked on the project to gain famine relief.

It has a gilded dome and several turrets and minarets. The tombs of Muhammad Ali Shah and other members of his family are inside the imambara. This includes two replicas of the Taj Mahal, built as the tombs of Muhammad Ali Shah's daughter and her husband. The walls are decorated with Arabic calligraphy.

Water supply for the fountains and the water bodies inside the imambara came directly from the Gomti River.

== Tomb of Princess Asiya Begum, daughter of Nawab Mohammad Ali Shah Bahadur (3rd Nawab of Awadh) ==
This structure serves as a mausoleum for the grave of Princess Asiya Begum Sahiba, daughter of the Nawab Mohammed Ali Shah and two other graves. This is a small-scale copy of the Taj Mahal.

== Treasury ==
The other structure facing the tomb was built for the architectural symmetry and balance of the Imambara. It was used as a treasury.

== Husainabad Mosque ==
This mosque is built on a high platform with two grand minarets on the edge of the platform. This mosque is very beautifully decorated with floral designs and Quranic calligraphy.

== Satkhanda ==
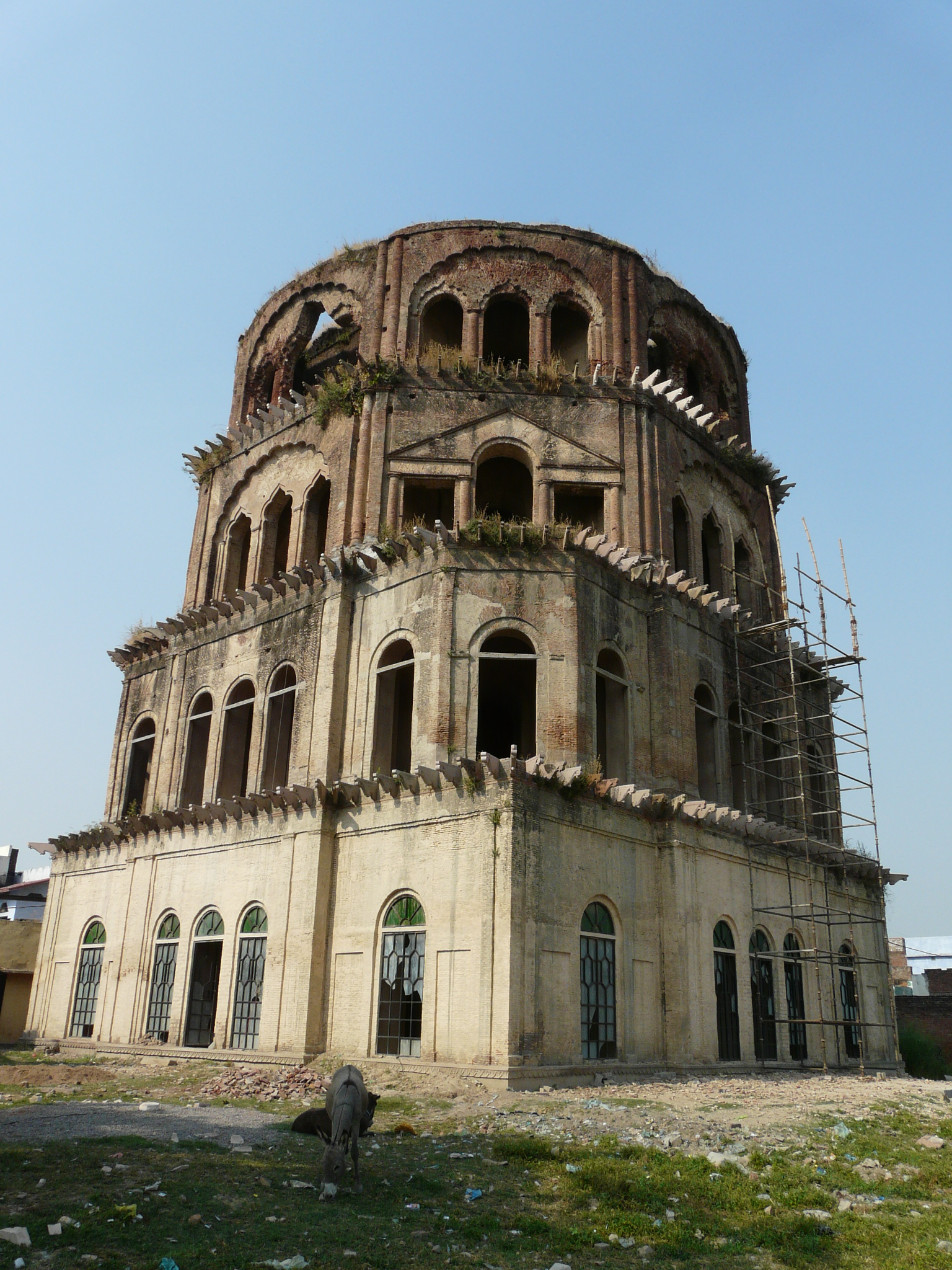
Satkhanda, the incomplete watch tower and lunar observatory

The word Satkhanda means seven-storeyed but this beautifully proportioned tower would never live up to its name as construction was halted at level 4. Nawab Muhammad Ali Shah commissioned the structure during his reign, which started in 1837 and went on till 1842. He built it as a watch-tower to provide a bird's eye view of the old city area of Lucknow. The tower has many huge triple-arched windows and compartments. A flight of spiral steps leads to different storeys of the building.

== Improper restoration ==
The building has been renovated; however, the process has been criticized. In 2016 The Economist wrote that "[this building] was recently “repaired” with modern cement, wrecking its subtle plasterwork".

== Gallery ==
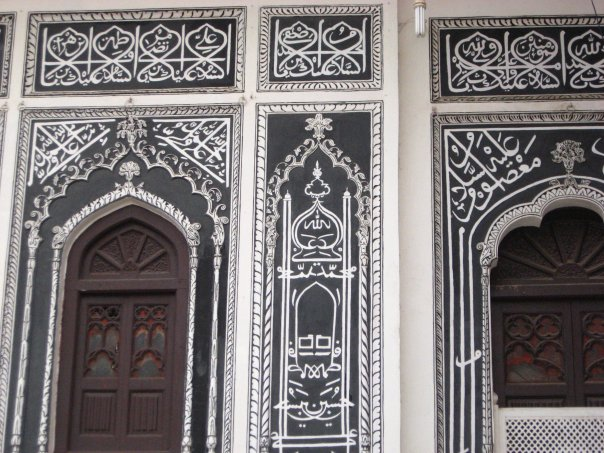
Details of the Arabic calligraphy

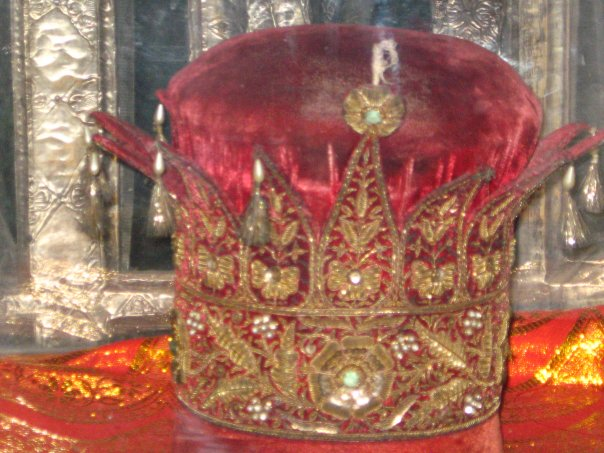
The crown of Muhammad Ali Shah, 3rd King of Awadh (1837–1843)

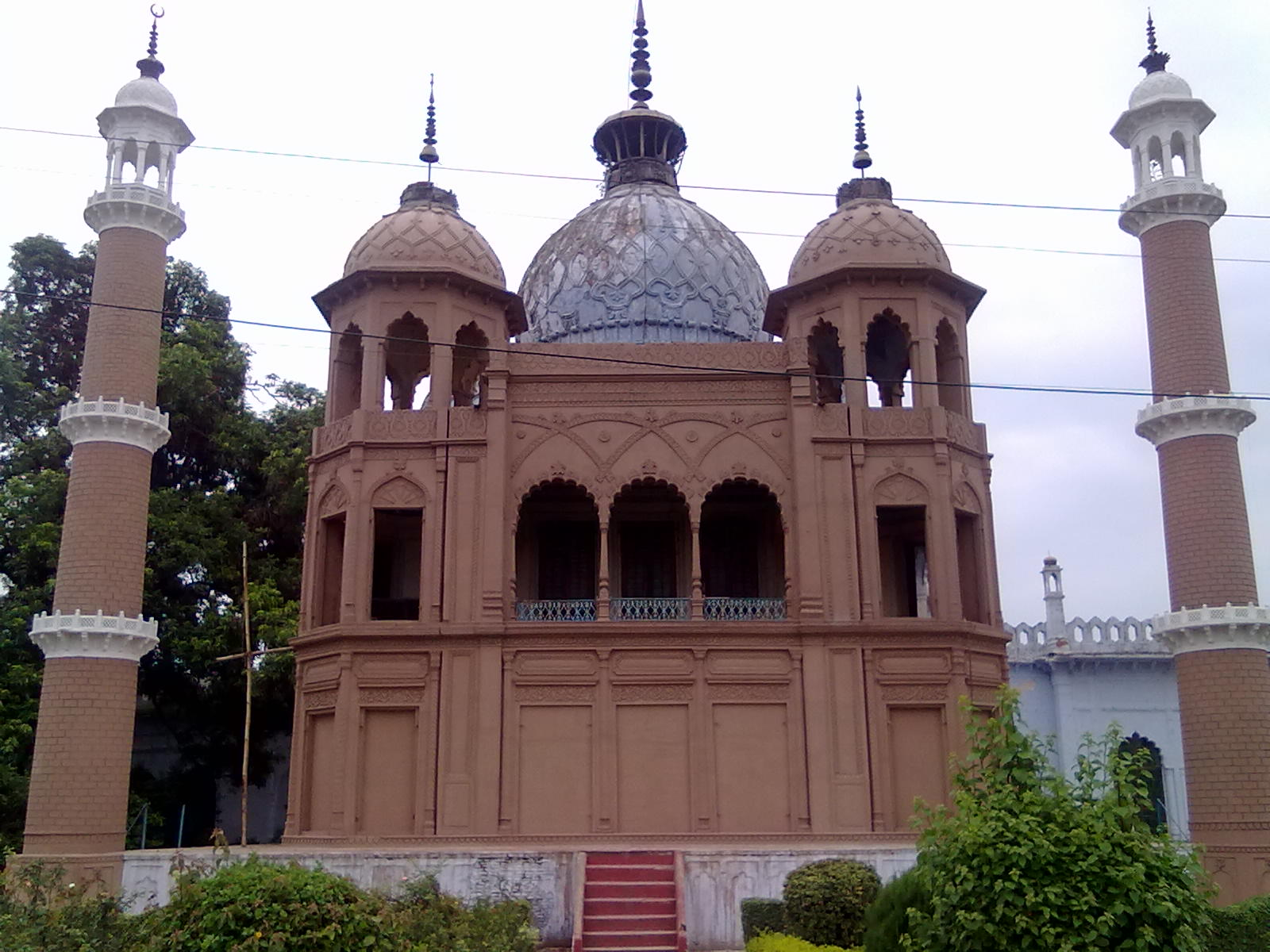
One of the twin tombs within the complex

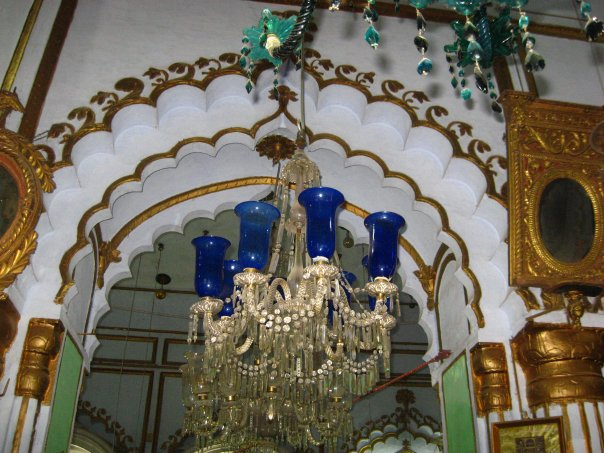
Chandeliers

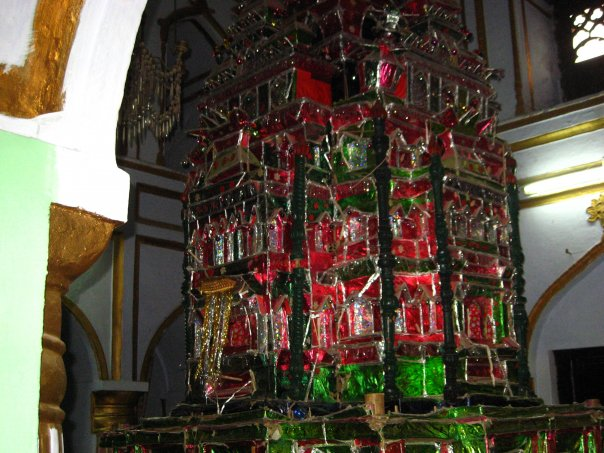
Tazia in the main hall

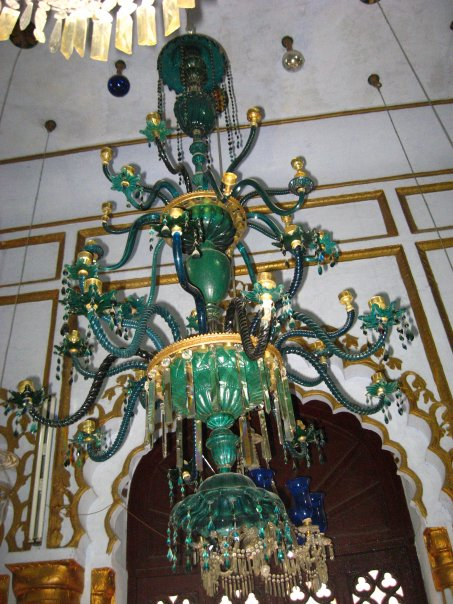
Chandeliers

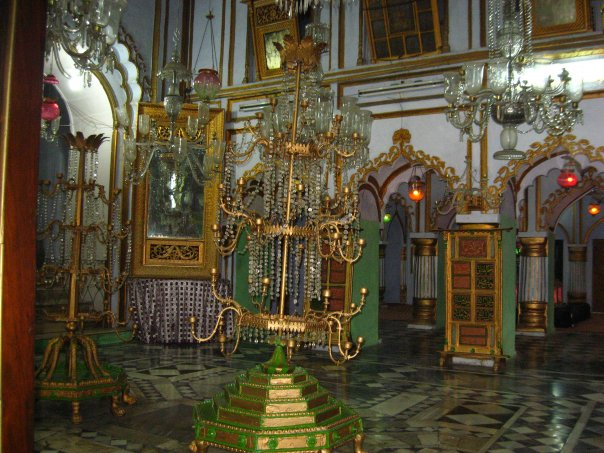
Floor chandeliers

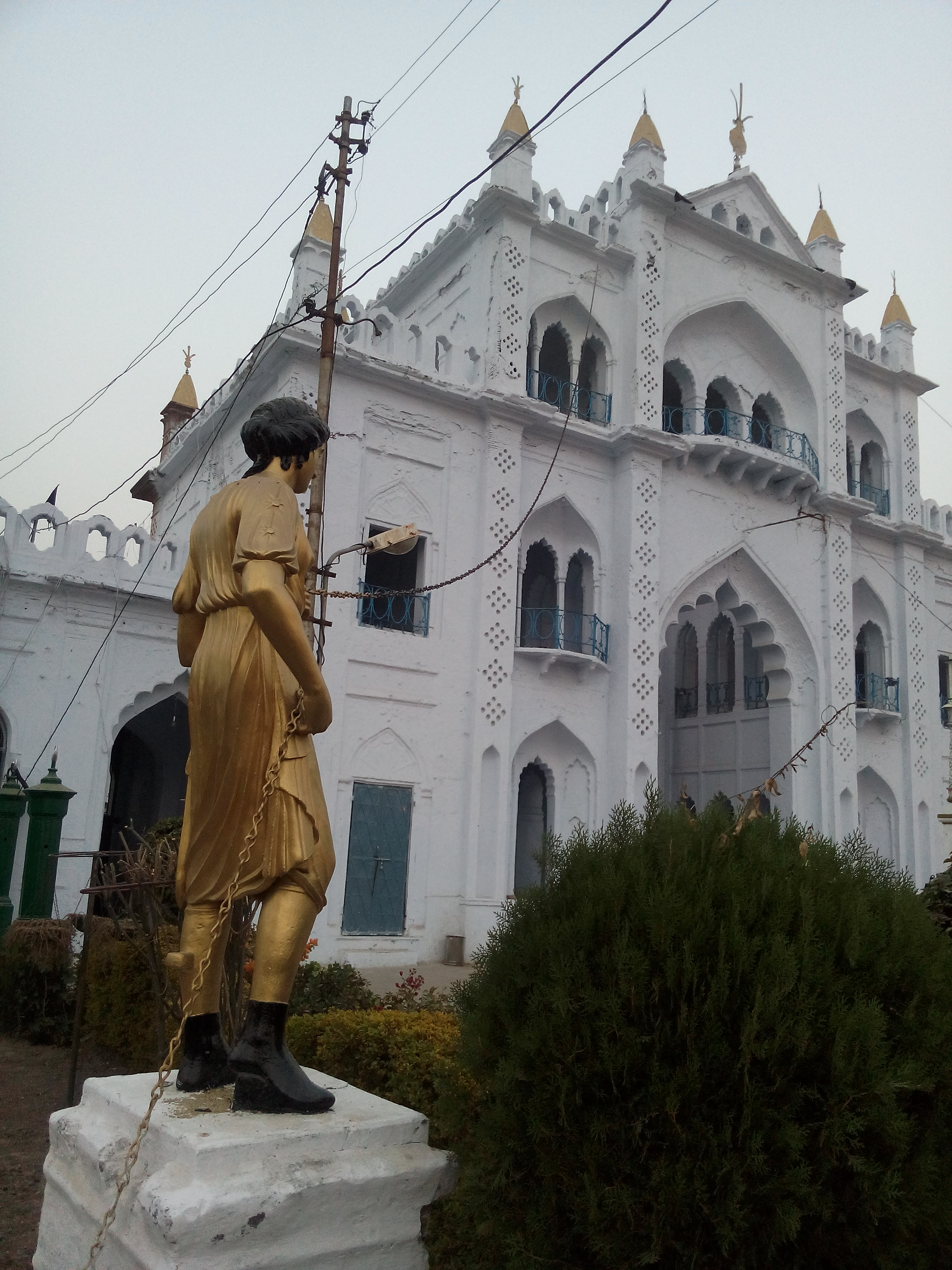
A statue holding chain for earthing purpose at main gate

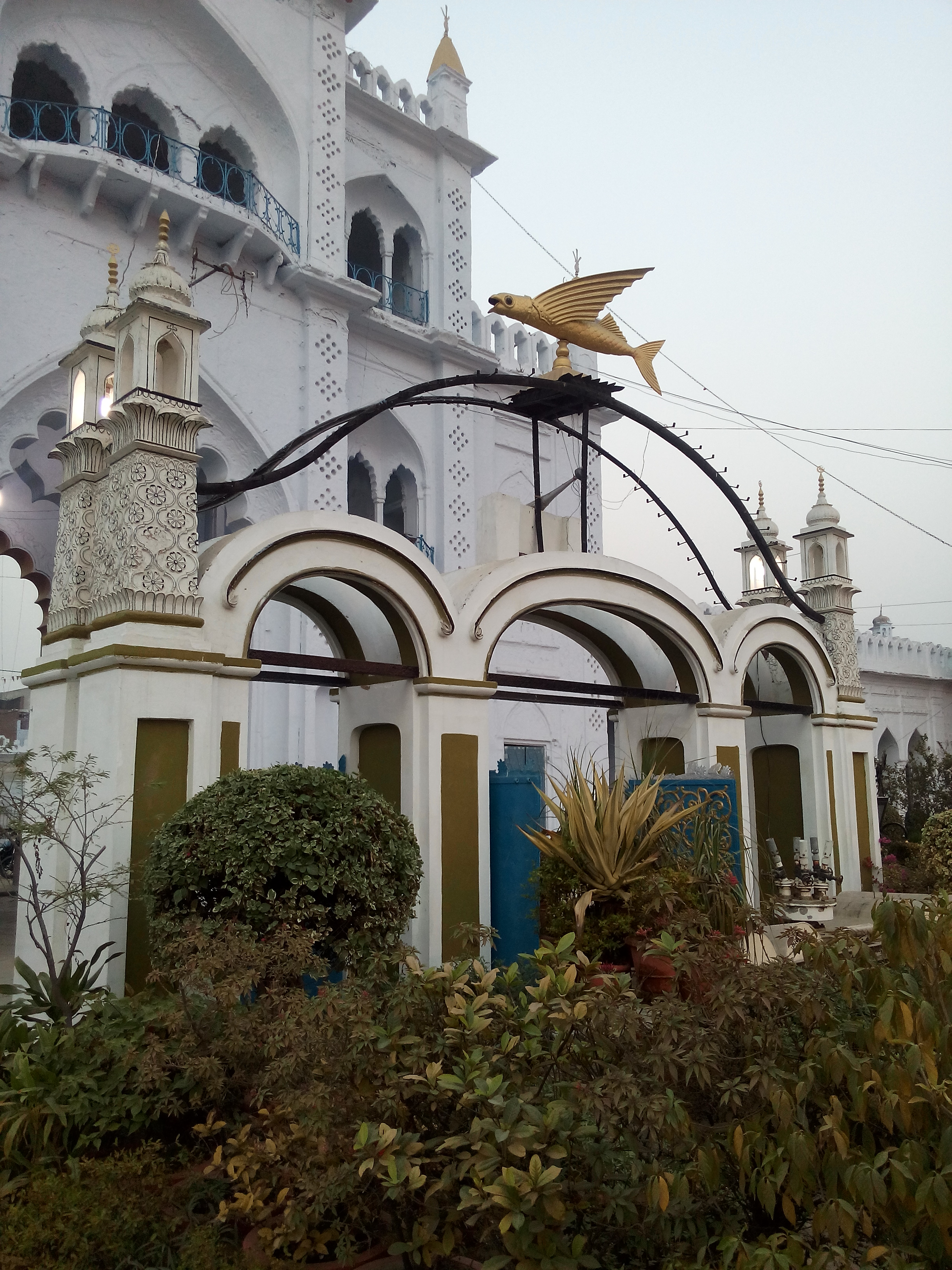
An anemometer in the form of fish at main gate

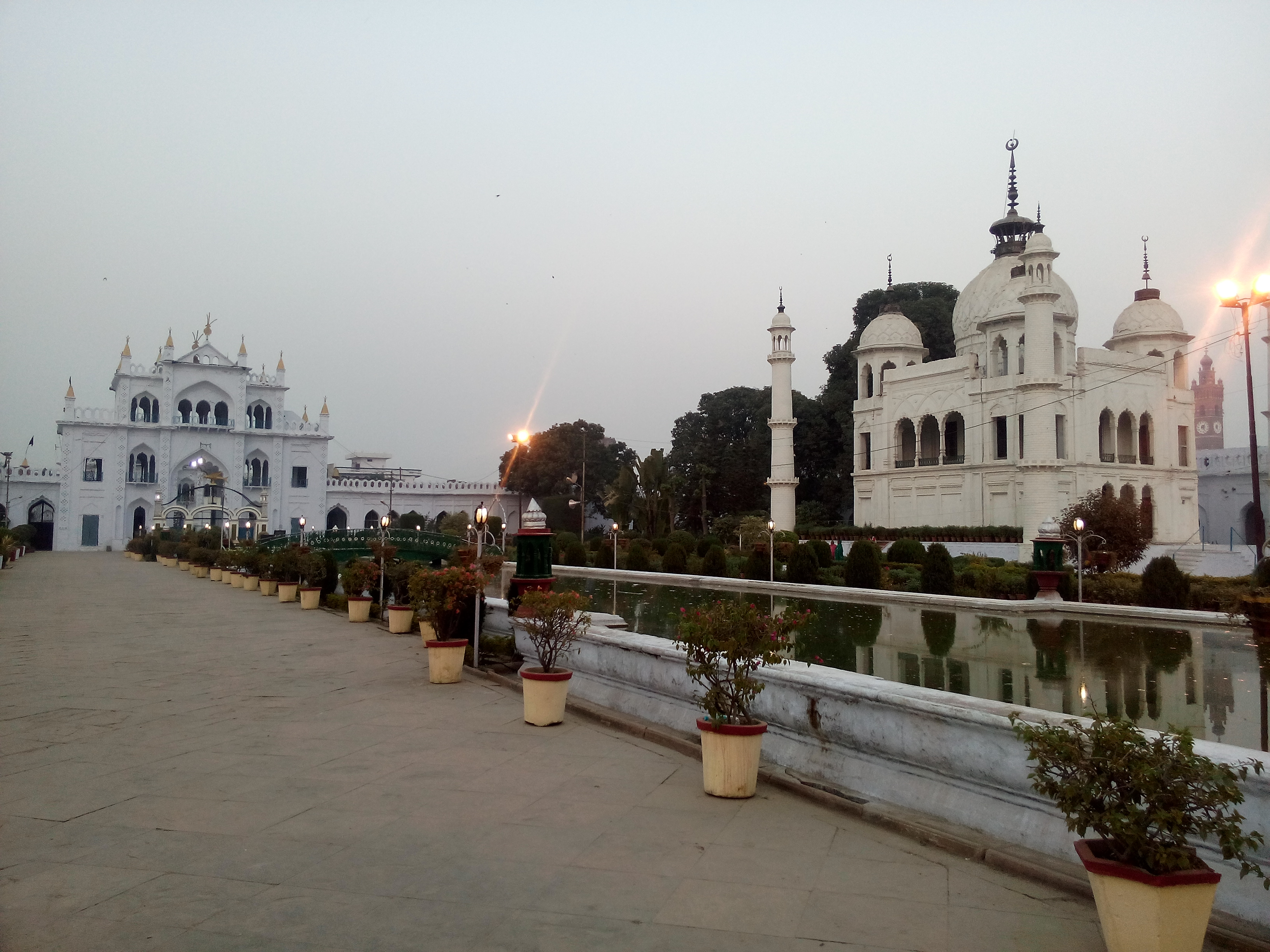
A pond in the courtyard

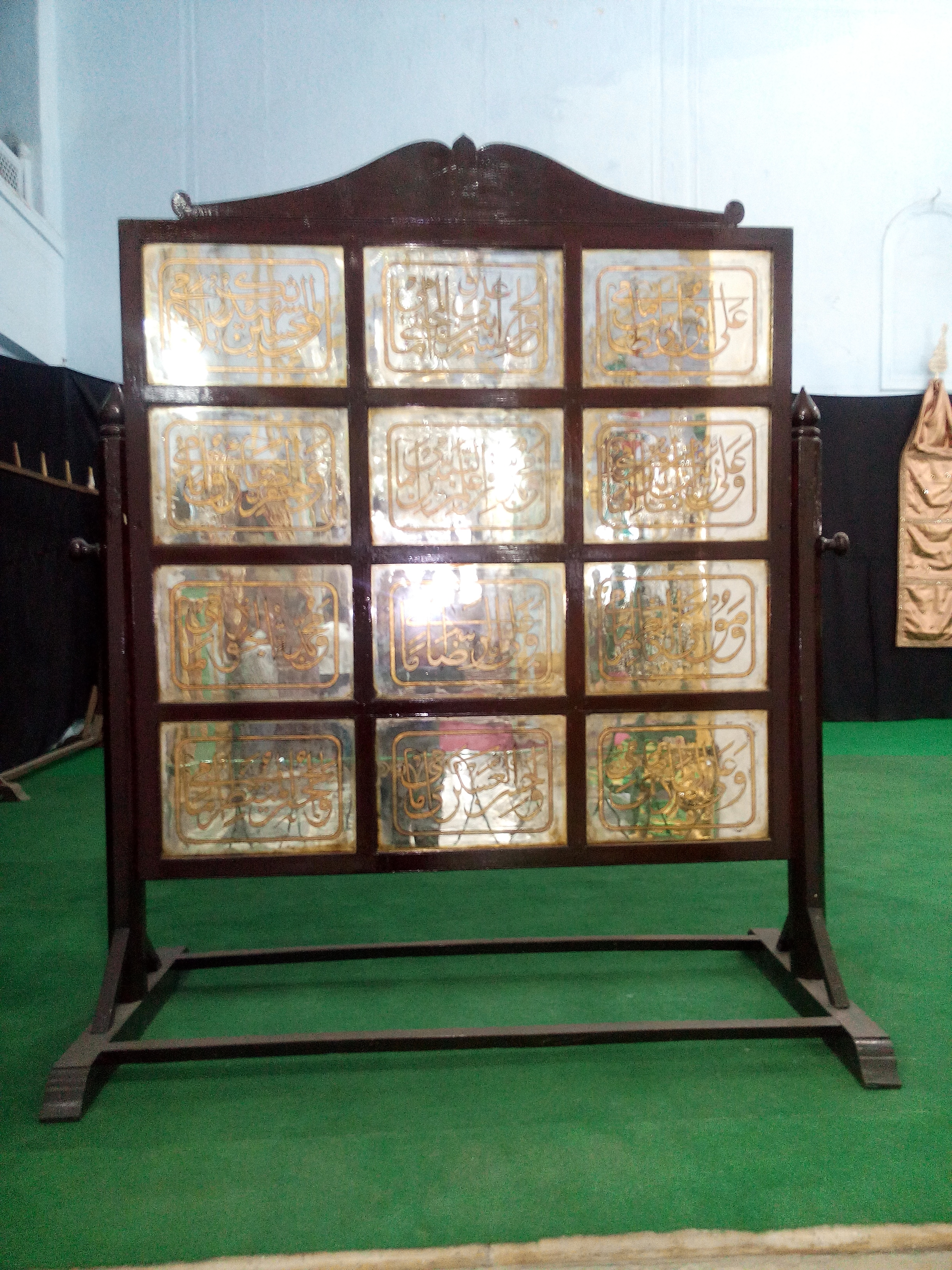
The name of The Twelve Imams in Arabic language

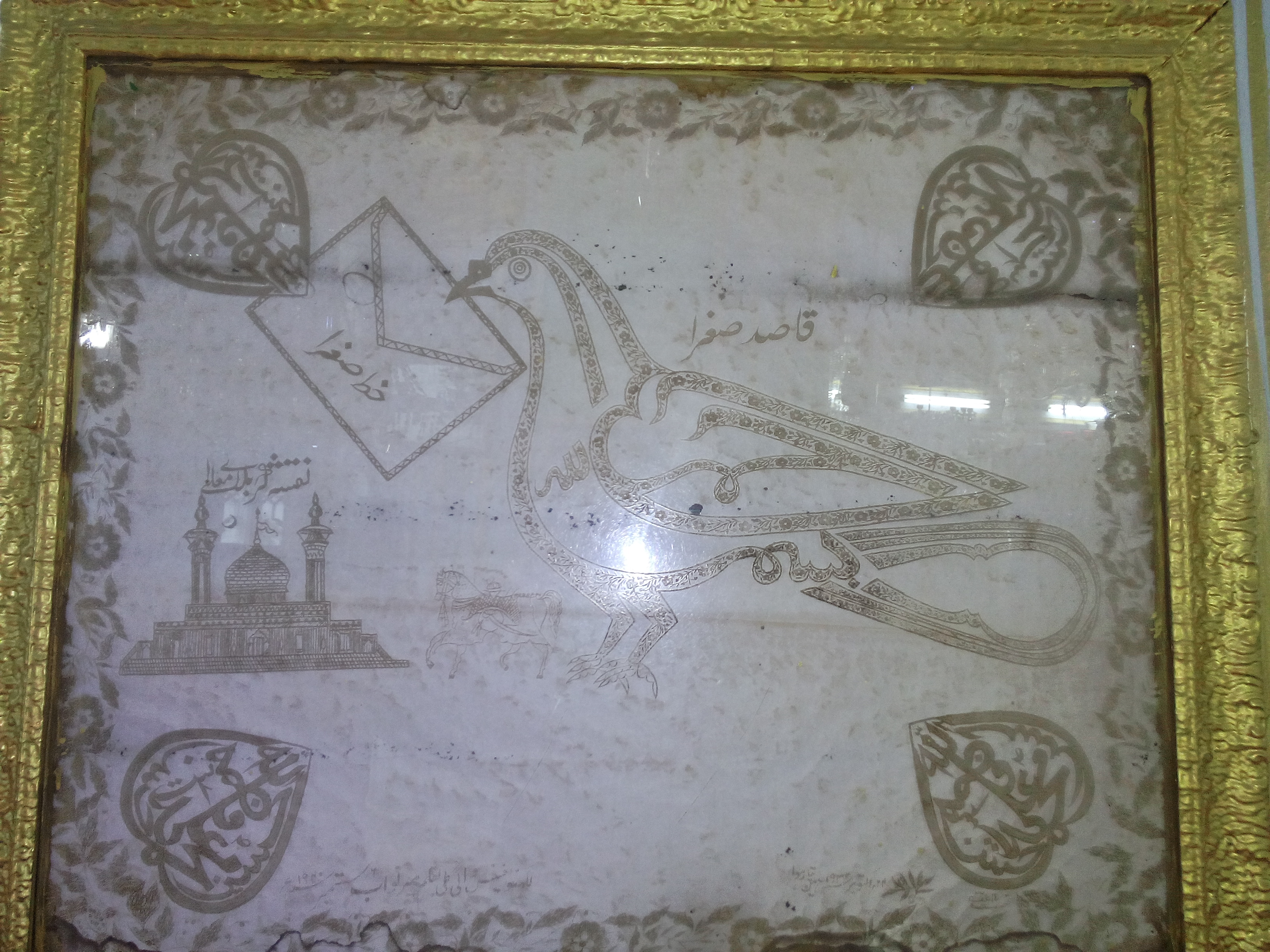
The word "Allah" written in the form of Pigeon, an example of Islamic calligraphy

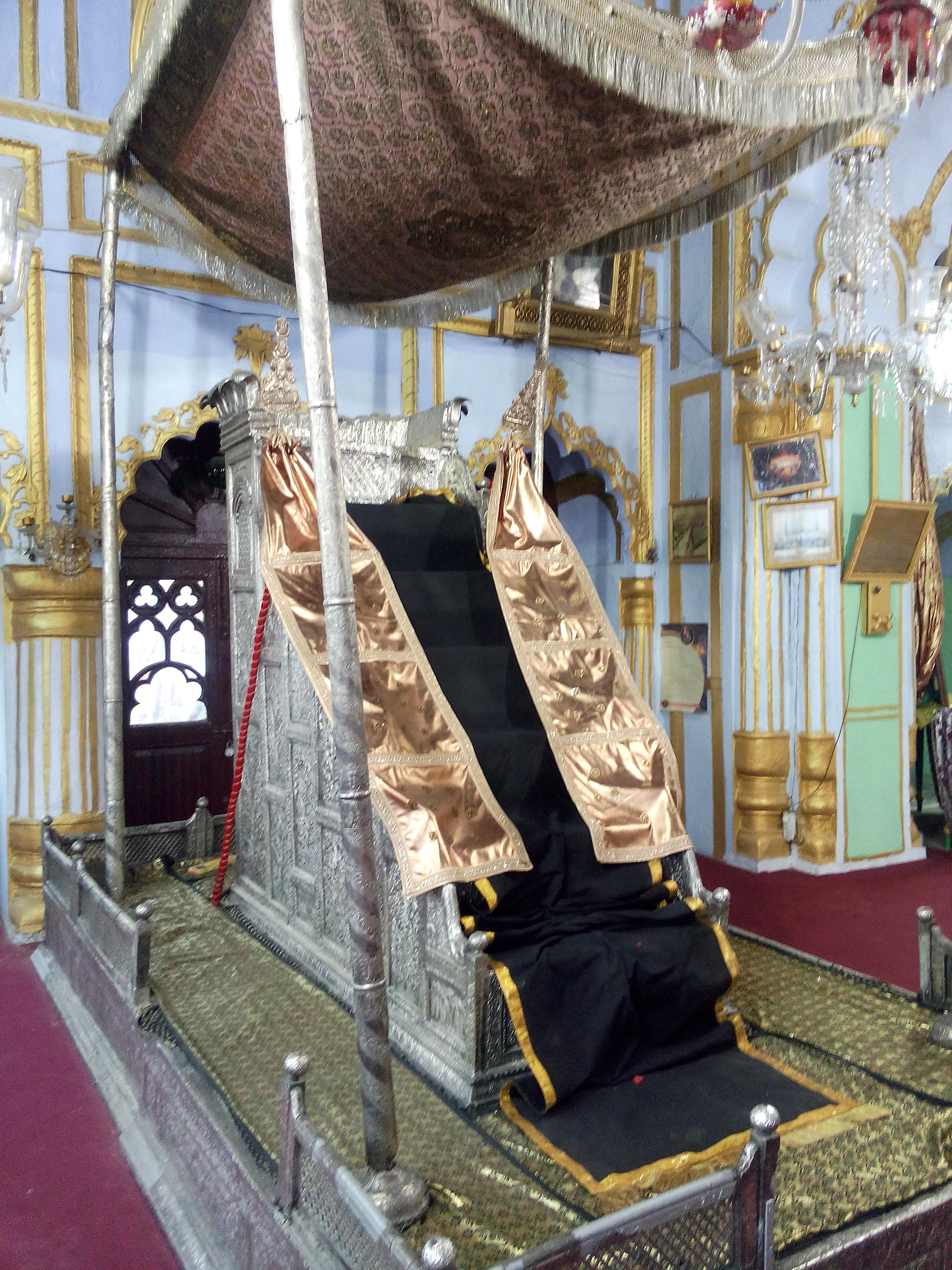
The Mimber used for Majlis (Mourning Congregation) during Muharram.

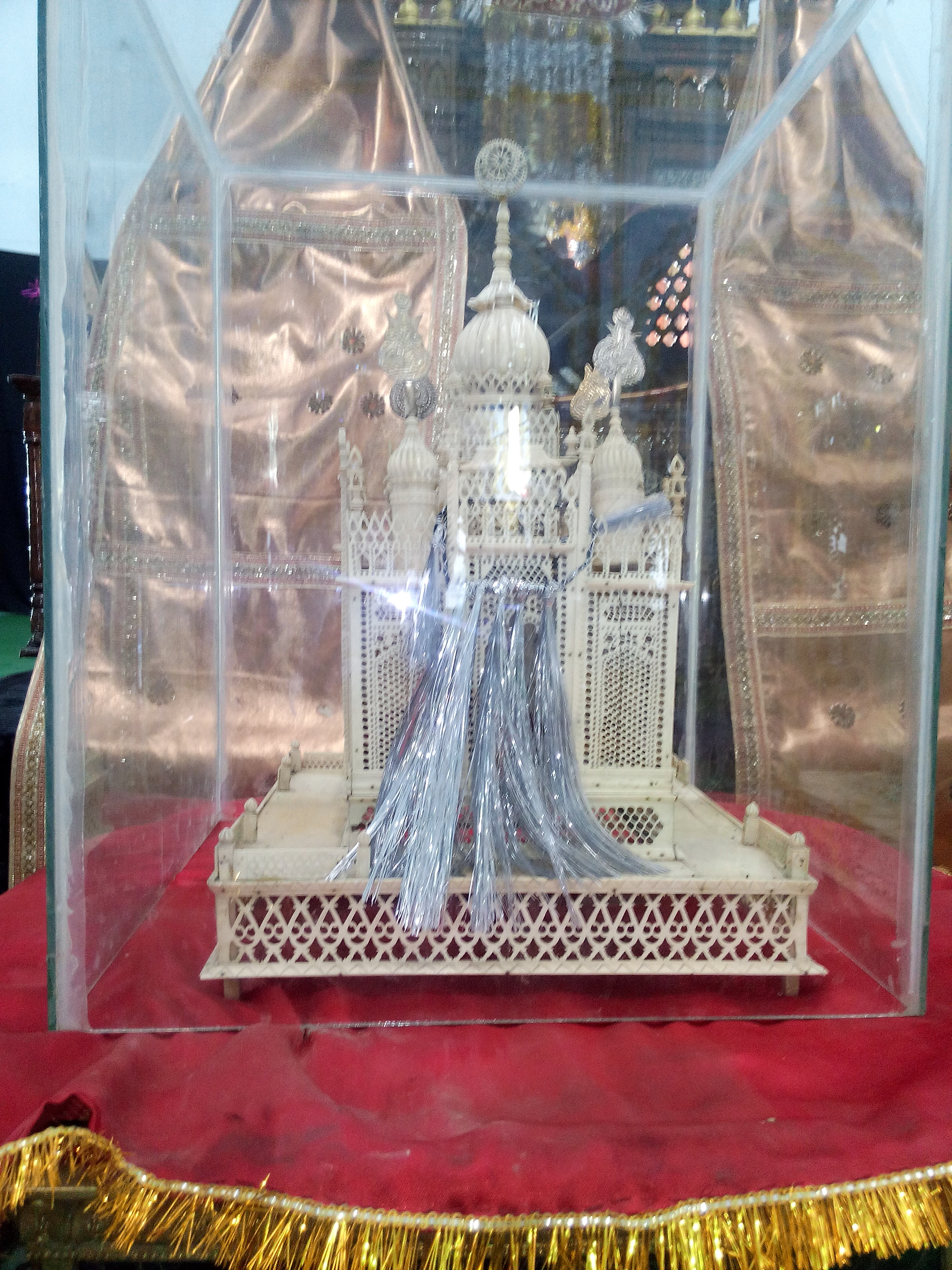
A Tazia made with elephant ivory

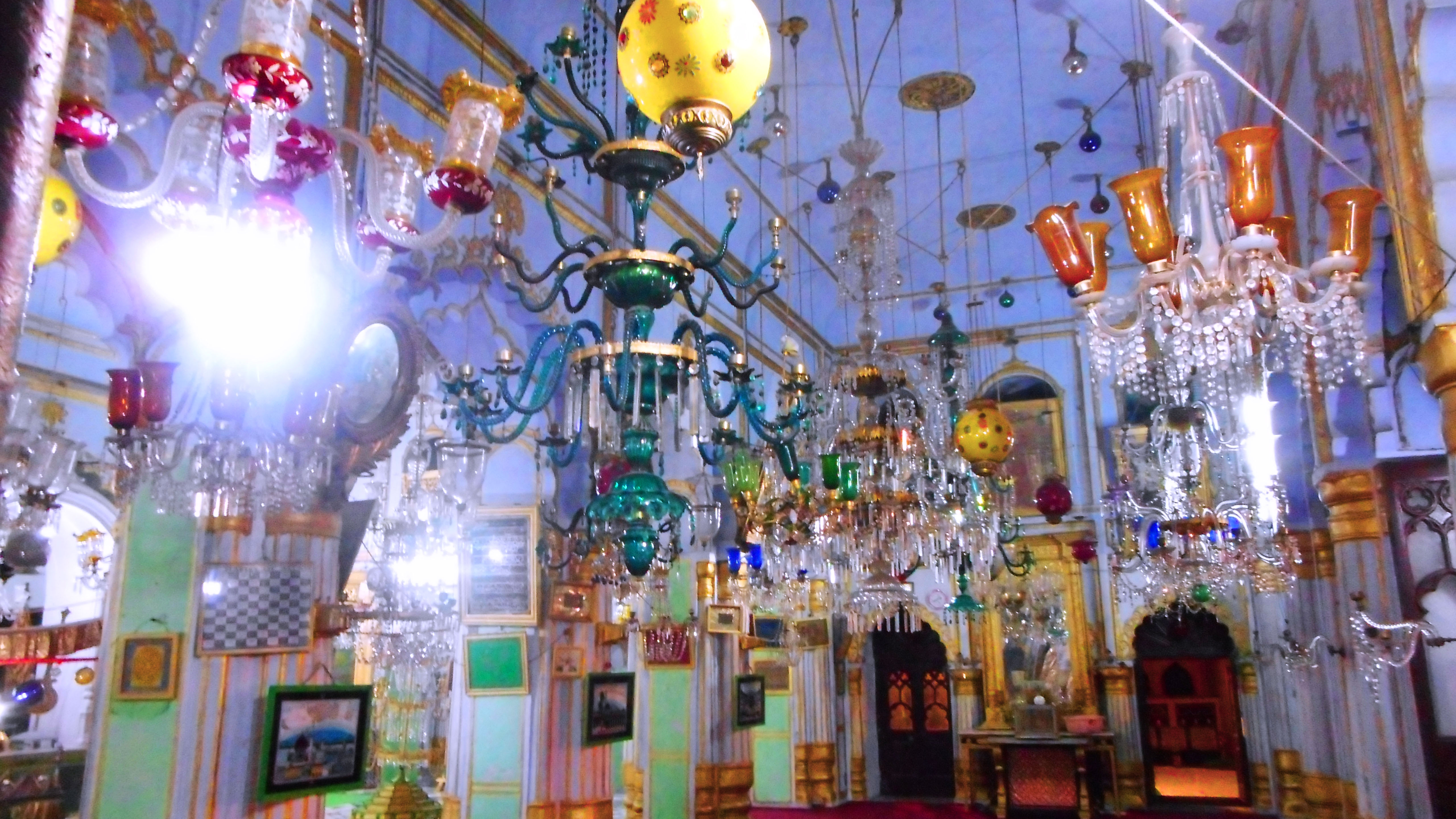

== See also ==
- Chattar Manzil
- Imambara Shah Najaf
- Hussainia
- Imambaras of Lucknow
- Azadari in Lucknow
- Buland Darwaza
