= Pakka Pul Pir =

Shrine in Karnal, India

Pakka Pul Pir / Pakke Pul Wali is a Dargah located in Madhuban Karnal Haryana. This Dargah has five mazars, namely Ilahi Bakhsh and the other 4 mazars of Mohmmad Ali, Bahadur Khan Durrani, Sabal Singh Bawri and Kesar Mal Singh Bawri.
