= Imambara Shah Najaf =

Imambara in Lucknow

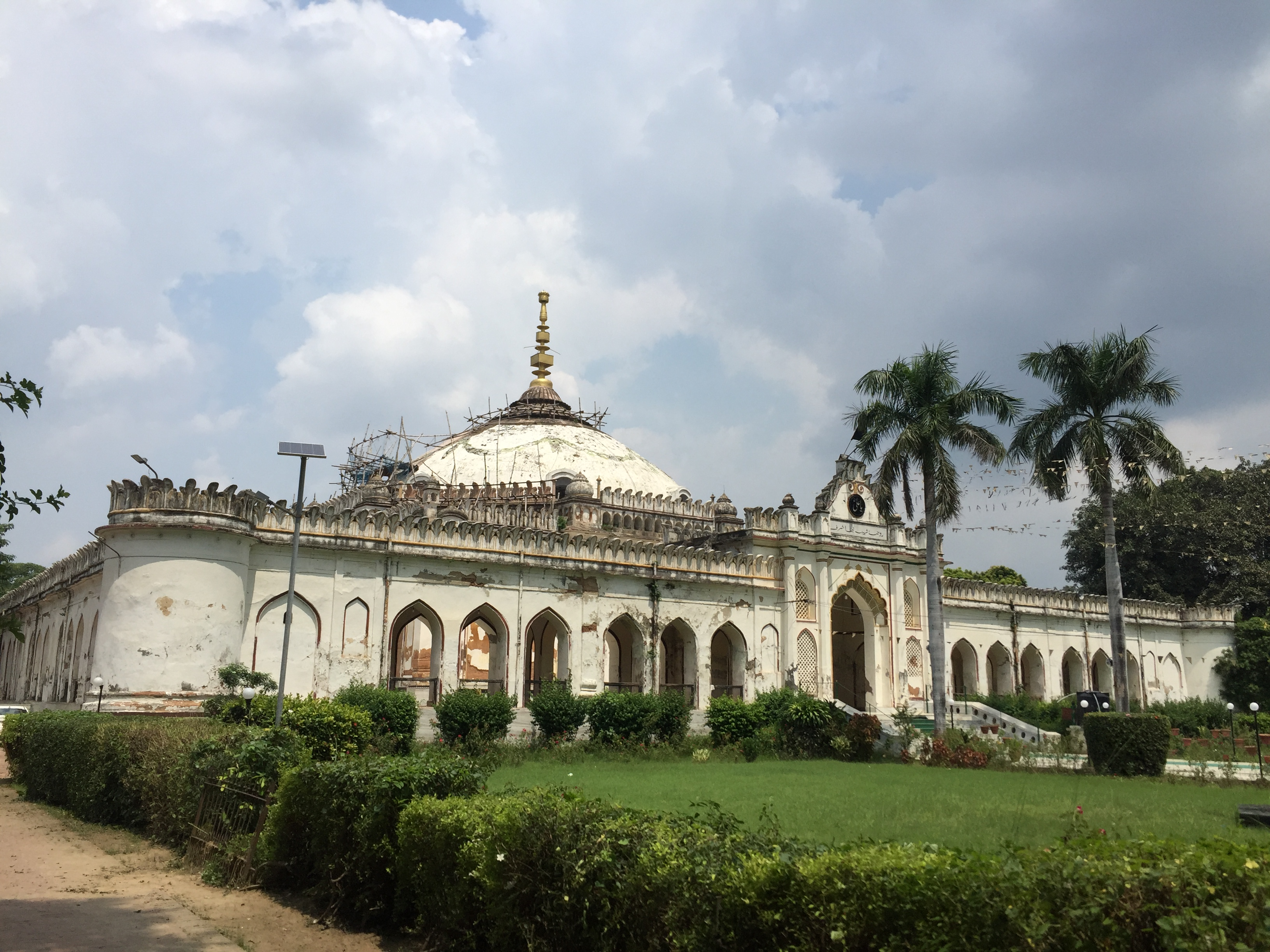

- Location within Uttar Pradesh Location within India

Religion
- Affiliation: Shia Islam

Location
- Location: Lucknow, Uttar Pradesh
- Country: India
- Interactive map of Imambara Shah Najaf
- Coordinates: 26°51′31″N 80°56′46″E

Architecture
- Founder: Nawab Ghazi Uddin Haider
- Completed: 1823
- Materials: Lakhauri bricks

Shah Najaf Imambara is one of the several imambaras in Lucknow, Uttar Pradesh, India.

== History ==
Shah Najaf Imambara was constructed by Nawab Ghazi-ud-Din Haider in 1818, the last Nawab Wazir and the first King of the Oudh state in 1818 to 1827. The building was named after the term Shah-e-Najaf (King of Najaf) which is an allusion to Ali. This imambara served as Ghazi-ud-Din Haider's mausoleum. His three wives Sarfaraz Mahal, Mubarak Mahal and Mumtaz Mahal are also buried there.

The thick walls around the mosque are said to have withstood the heavy gun fires of British naval brigade during their advance in 1857.

== Location ==
Shah Najaf Imambara is located near Gomti river on the Rana Pratap Road almost 4 kilometres away from the Bada Imambara. It is close to the Sikandar Bagh Chauraha and is flanked by National Botanical Research Institute on one side. The monuments is quite close to Hazratganj market.

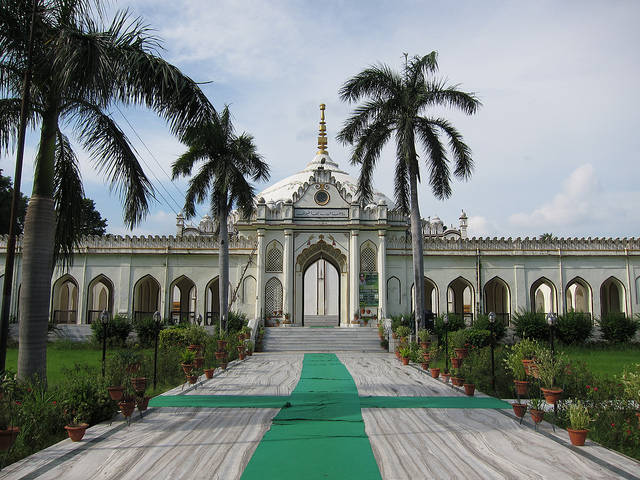
Mosque in 2013

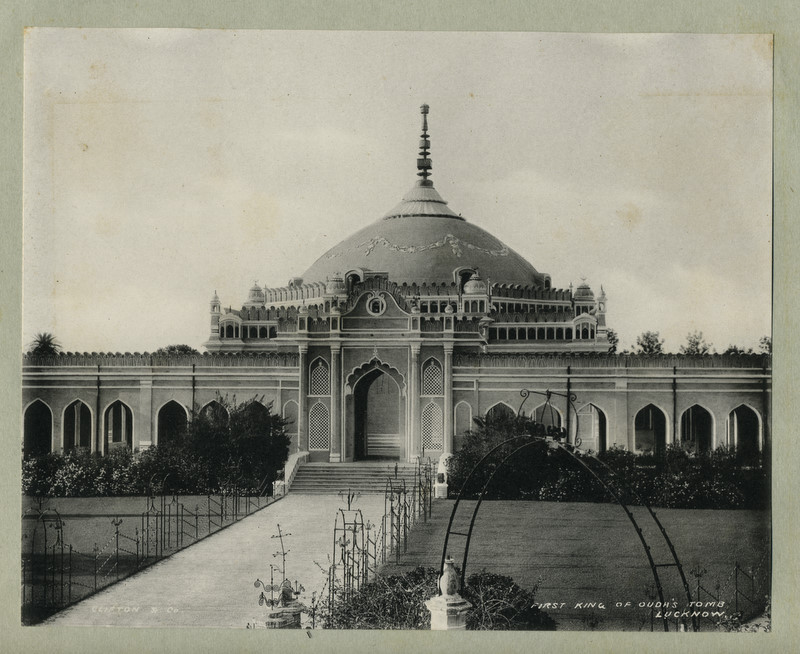
Shah Najaf in the 1890s

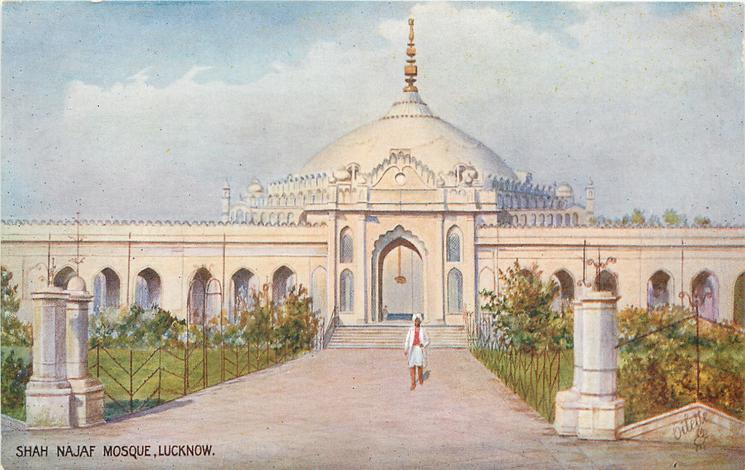
Illustration of Shah Najaf Mosque on postcard of Raphael Tuck & Sons

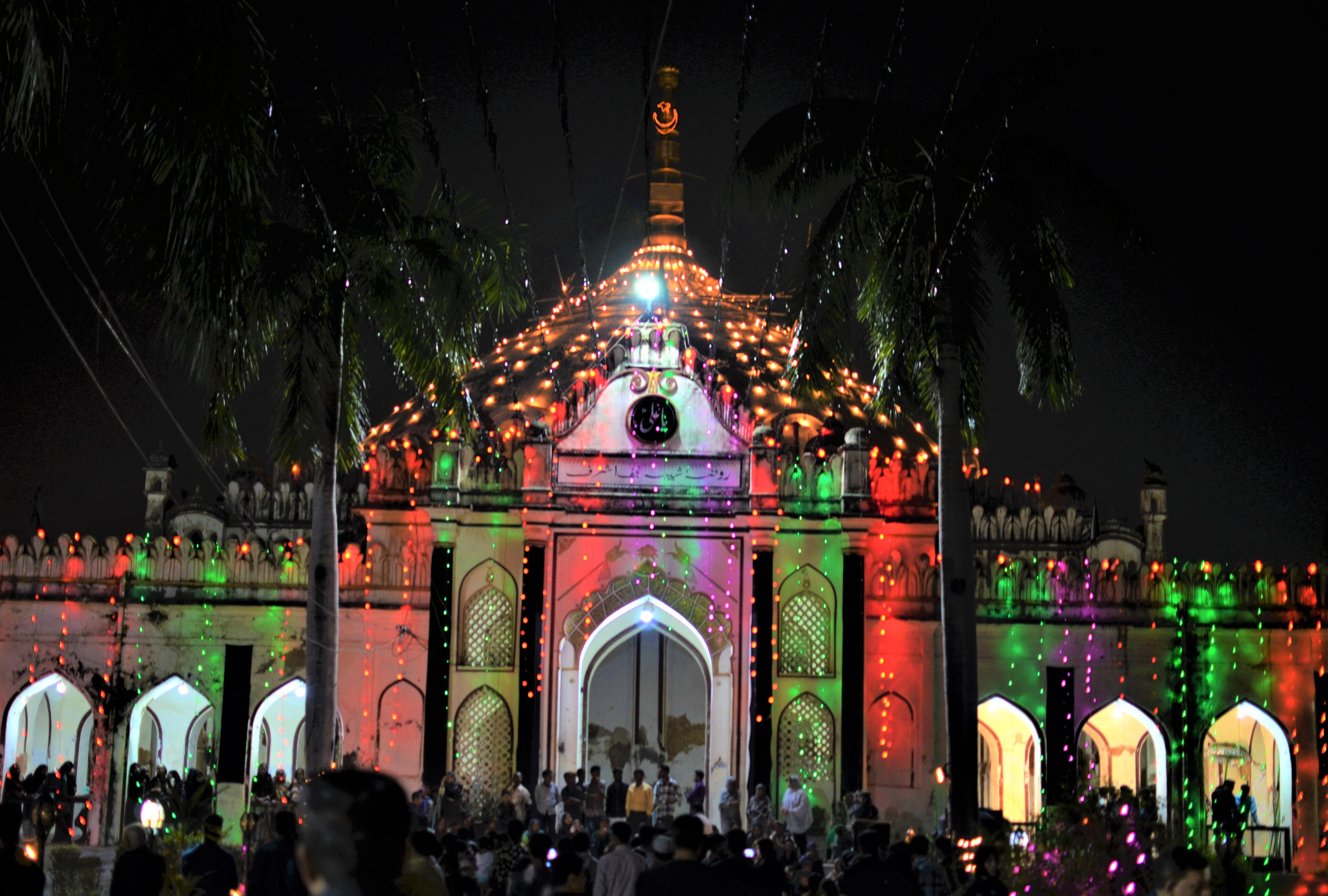
Decorations on the observance of Muharram

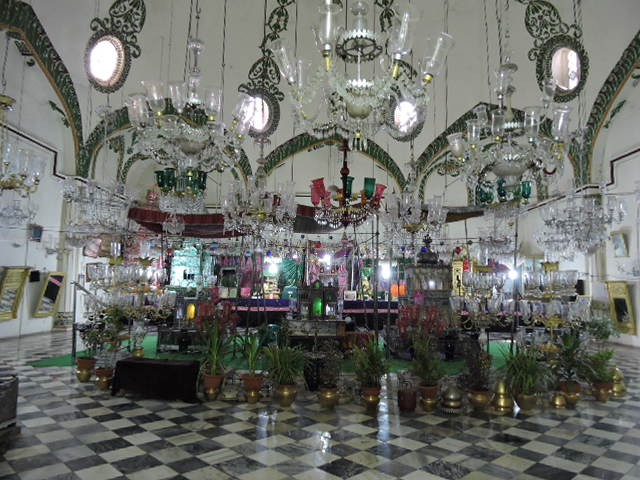
Interiors of the Mosque

== See also ==
- Chota Imambara
- Bara Imambara
- Roomi Darwaza
- Chattar Manzil
- Imambara Ghufran Ma'ab
- Imambaras of Lucknow
