= Imambaras of Lucknow =

Shia Muslim buildings in the Indian city

Lucknow is known as a city of imambaras as it contains a large number of them, among which, some are very well known.

== Lucknow the center of Azadari in India ==
Lucknow is the center of Azadari in India because of the large number of Imambaras in the city. There are multiple replicas of every holy Shia shrine which reflects the efforts of the Nawabs of Awadh (Oudh) to promote Azadari in the Indian sub-continent. Lucknow holds the privilege of holding the Shabi-e-Rauza (Replicas of the original Shrines or Tombs) of all the Members of Muhammad S.A.W. 's family, collectively known as Ahlebait a.s.. Not only the Nawabs but also the noble men and the locals built the Shrines(Shabi-e-Rauza) of Ahlebait a.s. in Lucknow. These shrines were built for the people who were unable to visit the original Shrines in the Middle East region.

== Imambara ==
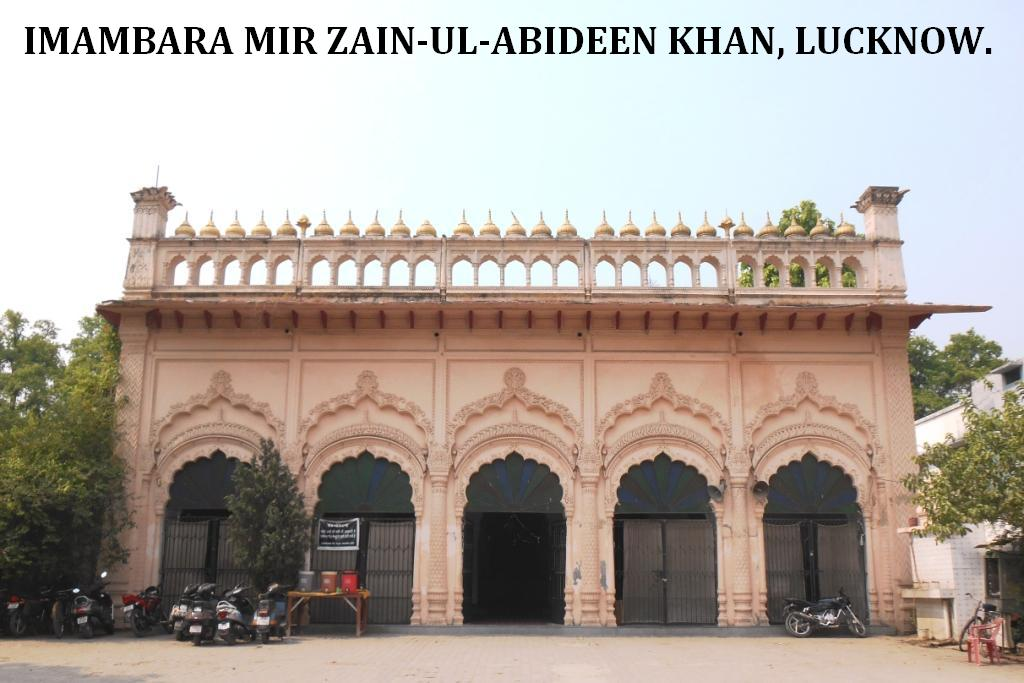
Imambara Mir Zain-ul-Abideen Khan, Lucknow

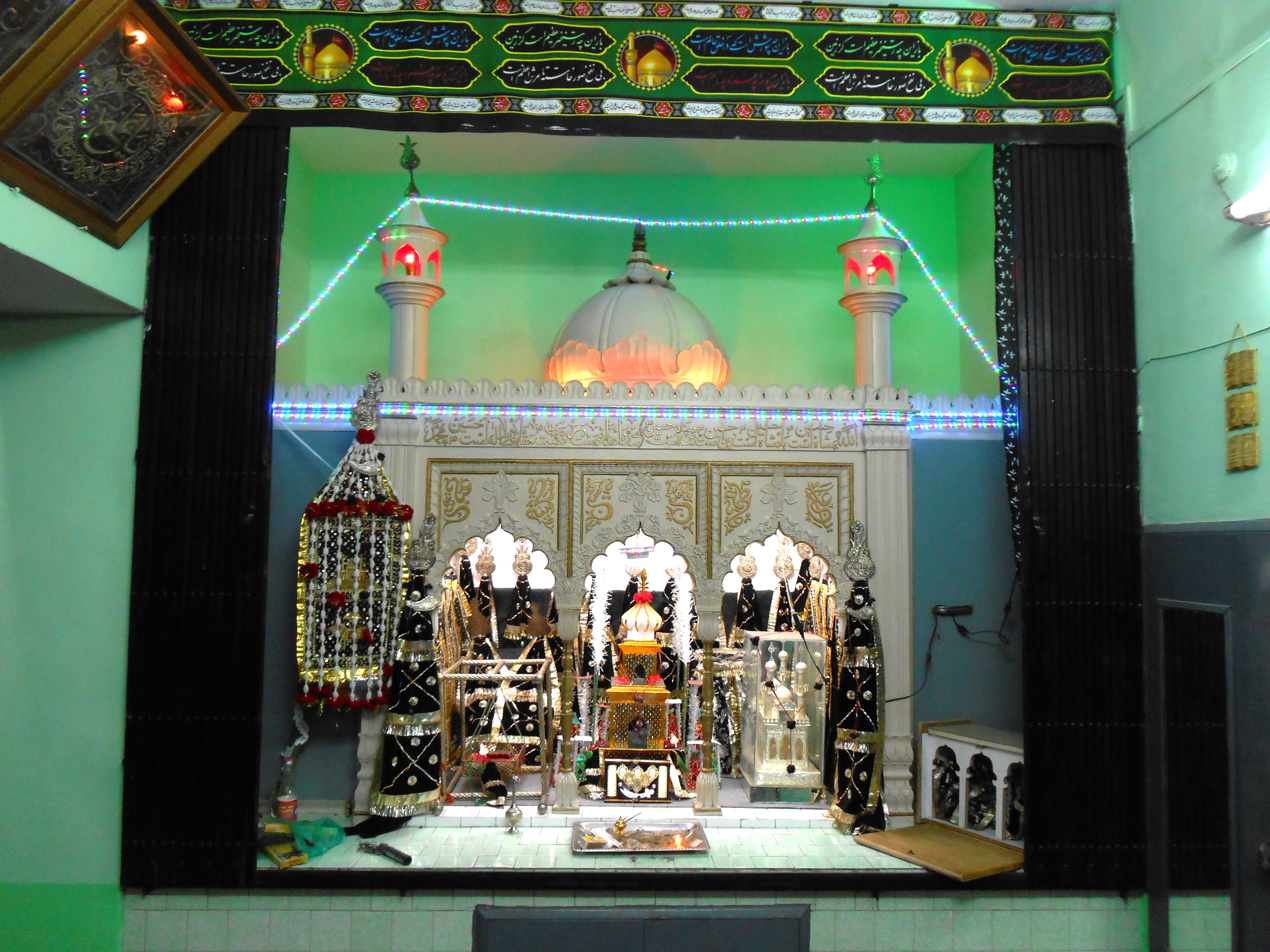
Imambara at the residence of Mr. Aziz Alam, Sharif Manzil, Husainabad, Lucknow

An "Imambara" or an "Imambargah" means (House of Imam or Court of Imam); this word is a North Indian origin. An Imambara is also known as Husayniyya, Ashoor Khana. An Imambara is a place or a building with a hall where people assemble for "Majlis" (Mourning Congregations) of Imam Husain a.s. and Martyrs of Karbala.

An Imambara is different from a Mosque as it is intended for "Majlis". But Namaz can be offered in an Imambara. An Imambara in Indian Sub-continent is generally built south facing and the western wall of the hall can be used for Namaz.

The main building of an Imambara is called "Azakhana" and is constructed in a manner where under the dome the "Taaziya" (The replica of the original tomb) or "Zarih" (The wooden or metal protective grill constructed around the Holy Graves.) is kept on an approximately 3 feet high platform called the "Shehnasheen", where the Zaireens (Visitors) can bow their head and kiss the platform in a manner to pay respect to Imam Husain and the martyrs of Karbala. One or two halls are added after the "Shehnasheen" for the "Majlis".

The first hall generally serves as the burial place for the builder of the Imambara and his household. A "Mimber" (A staircase like structure) is kept in the second hall for "Majlis". The "Zakir" (The Orator) sits on the "Mimber" and the "Azadaars" (The Mourners) sits on the floor of the hall. As the number of "Azadaars" (The Mourners) increases The "Zakir" (The Orator) sits one step upwards on the "Mimber" in order to address the whole gathering. The "Azakhana" generally have five doorways resembling the significance and importance of "Panjetan" in Shia Islam.

The oldest imambara of Lucknow was built during the reign of Nawab Abul-Mansur Khan (Nawab Safdar Jung) in 1745 by Mirza Abu Talib Khan. He was son of Haji Mohammad Beg and enjoyed a respectable position during the reign of Nawab Safdar Jung. This imambara no longer exists. Almost every Shia constructs an imambara at their home. The Imambara may differ in terms of size and material used for its construction e.g. wood, metal or concrete.

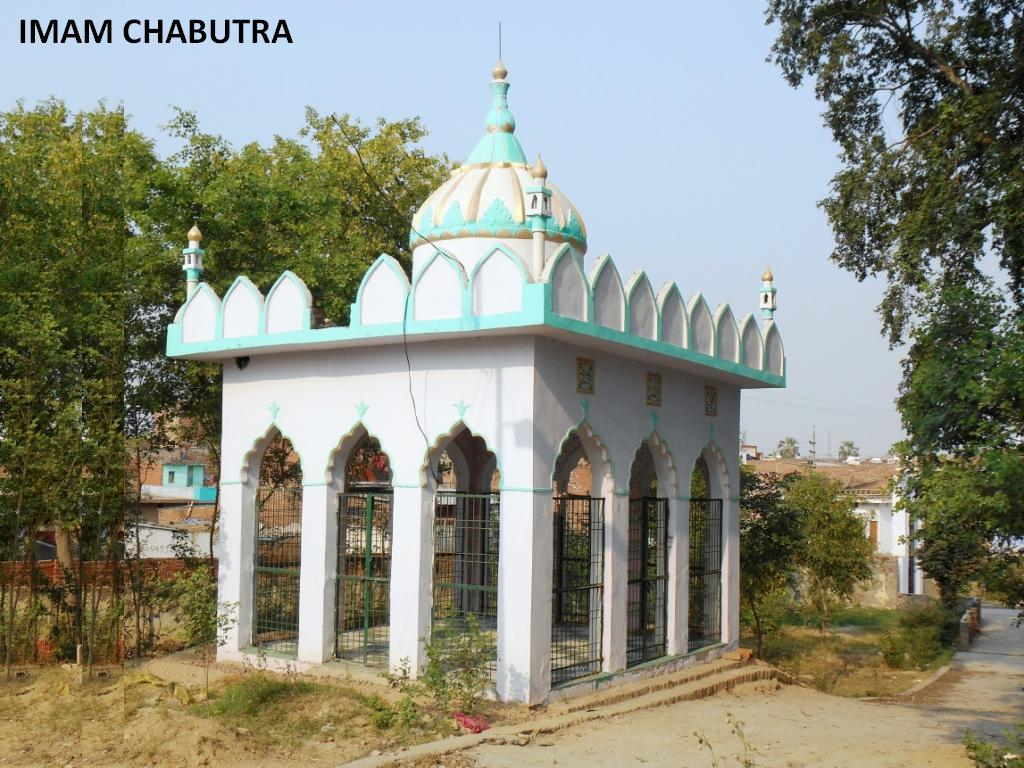
Imam Chabutra at Karbala Musahab-ud-Daulah, Misri ki Baghiya, Ali Colony, Lucknow

== Imam Chabutra ==
An "Imam Chabutra" is a structure built on the site where the soil from the shrines of all "14 Masoomeen" (The Fourteen Infallible) is buried in one place. An "Imam Chabutra" is generally constructed with a dome and 12 doors (3 doors on each of its 4 sides) and a "Zarih" is mounted inside it. The purpose of building the Shrine is to give an easy access to those people who are unable to visit the original Shrines in the Middle-Eastern region. Lucknow has two "Imam Chabutra".

1. The oldest "Imam Chabutra" is situated at Karbala Musahab-ud-Daulah, Misri ki Baghiya, Ali Colony, Lucknow. The original structure was destroyed by time and only the platform was left but a new structure is erected on the same platform. This new structure has a dome and 12 doors (3 doors on each of its 4 sides).

2. The second Imam Chabutra is situated at Shahganj in Nkkhas area.

== Dargah ==
Dargah is generally associated with Abbas Alambardar. "Shah-e-Wafa" (The King of Loyalty). He was the younger brother and the Flag Commander of Imam Husain at the battle of Karbala. Abbas Alambardar was martyred on 10th of Muharram 61 AH (10 October 680 AD) in the battle of Karbala. A "Dargah" is an "Imambara" like structure where the "Zarih" is kept on a high platform (generally 4 to 5 feet high) under the dome, where the "Zaireens" (Visitors) can raise their hands in such a manner if they are asking for their wishes.

Lucknow has two Dargahs of Abbas Alambardar

1. Dargah Abbas Alambardar, Rustam Nagar, Lucknow. This Dargah came into existence during the reign of Nawab Asaf-ud-Daulah (1775–1797 AD). A poor man, Mirza Faqeera Beg, was visited by Abbas in his dream and directed to dig out his Alam (Standard) from a specific location in the city. 2. Dargah Abbas Alambardar, situated at Karbala Musahab-ud-Daulah, Misri ki Baghiya, Ali Colony, Thakurganj, Lucknow. This Karbala also has a Mosque, an Imambara of Bi Misri Sahiba {Associated with Ali Akber} and an Imam Chabutra. 3 Dargah Abbasbagh situated at road between Thakurganj and balaganj Ali Colony

== Rauza ==
A "Rauza" (Tomb) is the replica of the original Tomb or Shrine situated in the Middle-Eastern region. The "Rauza" is different from an "Imambara" and "Dargah". In a "Rauza" the "Zarih" is mounted from the floor under the Dome and the "Zaireens" (Visitors) can do "Tawwaf" or "Circumambulation" (To move around) of the Zarih.

== Karbala ==
The term "Karbala" is derived from the city of Karbala (Iraq), where the original tombs (shrines) of Imam Husain and other martyrs of Karbala are situated. A "Karbala" is the place or compound where the Replica of Rauza of Imam Husain or more Rauza are built. But it is not necessary that a "Karbala" should have the Replica of Rauza of Imam Husain. A Karbala may contain the Rauza of other Imams also. The "Karbala" also serves as the cemetery for the local residents.

== Gunj-e-Shaheedan ==
The land of the Karbala compound which is used for the burial of "Taaziya" is called "Gunj-e-Shaheedan".

== List of Holy Shrines in Lucknow ==
- Aasafi Imambara or Bara Imambara. (One of the oldest Imambara of Lucknow) it has Asia's largest flat roof unsupported by columns.
- Imambara Husainabad Mubarak or Chota Imambara.
- Imambara Shah Najaf.
- Imambara Sibtainabad Mubarak or Imambara Jannat Nasheen.
- Imambara Agha Baqar Sahab. (This Imambara is associated with Abbas Alambardar. This Imambara is second oldest in Lucknow. Built by Agha Baqar during the reign of Nawab Shuja-ud-Daulah.
- Imambara Ghufran Ma'ab.
- Imambara of Hakeem Sayyed Yusuf Husain Sahab, Imambara Qasr-e-Jannat (Jannat ki Khidki). During the reign of King Nasir-ud-Din Haider, The "Chehal Mimbari", was revolutionized at this Imambara by putting 39 Small "Mimbers" on a Large "Mimber".
- Imambara of Nazim Sahab.
- Imambara of Mir Baqar Saudagar.
- Imambara of Moghul Saheba, the highest "Mimber" in India is kept in this Imambara.
- Imambara Kaiwan Jah.
- Imambara of (Nawab Salarjung Bahadur) Mirza Muhammad Ali Khan Sahab or Kaala Imambara."Zarih" in this Imambara has 13 domes associated with "13 Masoomin"
- Imambara of Mir Zain-ul-Abidin Khan Sahab.
- Imambara of Raja Jhau Lal Sahab, (Bait-ul-Maal)
- Imambara of Meeran Sahab
- Imambara of Kazmain

=== Rauza of Muhammad ===
The original Rauza of Muhammad is situated inside Masjid-e-Nabawi at Medina (Saudi Arabia). In Lucknow the Rauza of Muhammad is situated near Madarsa-e-Waizeen adjacent to Jahaz wali kothi in the Raja Bazar area of Lucknow. This rauza is known as "90 dar ki Masjid". This mosque is the small scale replica of Masjid-e-Nabawi and Rauza of Muhammad. This Masjid also have the replica of Rauza-e-Fatimain, Medina.

=== Qadam-e-Rasool ===
The shrines related to Muhammad are also known as "Qadam-e-Rasool", where the relic of Muhammad's foot print is kept. Once Lucknow have many "Qadam-e-Rasool".

- The oldest "Qadam-e-Rasool" in Lucknow was built in the year 1630 AD by Alkutaash Khan near Asharfabad.
- The second "Qadam-e-Rasool" was built during the region of Nawab Asaf-ud-Daulah. This shrine was built in a small Mosque in the Sardaar Bagh in Rustam Nagar Area.
- The third "Qadam-e-Rasool" was built by King Ghazi-ud-Din Haider in Wilayti Bagh in the area of Bibi Pur on the right bank of river Gomti. The Wilayti Bagh was built for Mubarak Mahal (the European wife of King Ghazi-ud-Din Haider).
- "Malika Badsha Begam Sahiba" the wife of King Ghazi-ud-Din Haider also built a "Qadam-e-Rasool" in Husn Bagh in the area of Daliganj.
- In the year 1830 King Nasir-ud-Din Haider also built a "Qadam-e-Rasool" in Imambara Shah Najaf (Hazratganj). This "Qadam-e-Rasool" was the most magnificent of all other "Qadam-e-Rasool". This "Qadam-e-Rasool" was partially destroyed on 16–17 November 1857 by the British forces.

=== Rauza of Ali ===
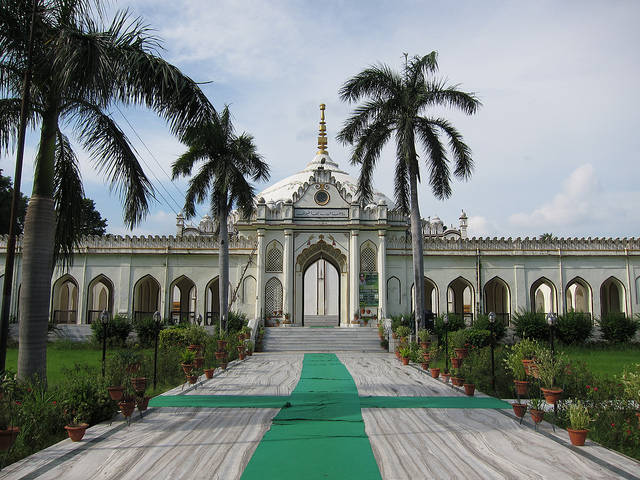
Imambara Shah Najaf, Lucknow

Ali is buried in the City of Najaf-e-Ashraf in Iraq, so the Rauza of Ali is called The Najaf.

- Imambara Shah Najaf. This is an Imambara associated with Ali. In this Imambara the Zarih of Ali is kept on a platform "Shehnasheen". This Imambara was built by King Ghazi-ud-Din Haider. This Imambara also serves as the tomb of King Ghazi-ud-Din Haider and his three wives.
- Najaf Qadeem or Purana Najaf. This Rauza is situated in the area of Niwaz Ganj. This is said to be the oldest Najaf in Lucknow.
- Najaf in Karbala Haji Maseeta near Karbala Mir Khuda Baksh (Karbala Taal Katora). This Rauza and the Karbala no longer exist but some land of the Karbala is still left by the name Waqf Karbala Haji Maseeta near the Karbala Azimullah Khan.
- Najaf of Hasan Mirza Sahab. This Rauza is situated in the area of Rustam Nagar. On the Day of 21 Ramzan a Taboot Juloos (Coffin procession) of Ali is carried out from this Najaf to the Najaf in Mir Khuda Baksh (Karbala Taal Katora).
- Najaf in Karbala Mir Khuda Baksh (Karbala Taal Katora). The Taboot Juloos of Ali which is carried out from Najaf of Hasan Mirza Sahab reaches here and the Taboot of Ali is buried here.
- Najaf in Sarfaraz Ganj. This Rauza was built by Late Nawab Ali Husain Mirza Sahab (Late Gauhar Agha Sahab), for the Isaal-e-Sawab of Late Mohammad Husain Ali Sahab (Babba Nawab Sahab).

=== Rauza-e-Fatimain (Rauza-e-Jannat-ul-Baqi) ===
The original tomb constructed over the Graves of Muhammad's daughter Fatimah and grandsons Hasan ibn Ali, 4th Shia Imam Zayn al-Abidin, 5th Imam Muhammad al-Baqir, 6th Imam Jafar al-Sadiq was situated at Jannat ul-Baqi, Madina, and was known as Rauza-e-Fatimain. The tomb was demolished on 21 April 1926 by king Abdul Aziz ibn Saud, but Lucknow have many replicas of the Tomb.

- The oldest Rauza-e-Fatimain (Rauza-e-Jannat-ul-Baqi) in Lucknow is situated in the area of Bulaki ka Adda on the right hand near the Suppa Ros Swamp (Daldal). This Rauza can be reached by a narrow lane situated near the Petrol Pump.
- Another Rauza-e-Fatimain (Rauza-e-Jannat-ul-Baqi) is situated in the compound of the Rauza of Muhammad is situated near Madarsa-e-Waizeen adjacent to Jahaz wali kothi in the Raja Bazar area of Lucknow. This rauza is known as "90 dar ki Masjid". This Mosque is the small scale replica of Masjid-e-Nawabi and Rauza of Muhammad in Medina.
- Rauza-e-Fatimain (Rauza-e-Jannat-ul-Baqi) in the area of Rustam Nagar.
- Rauza-e-Fatimain (Rauza-e-Jannat-ul-Baqi) in Karbala Mir Khuda Baksh (Karbala Taal Katora).

=== Bait-ul-Huzn ===
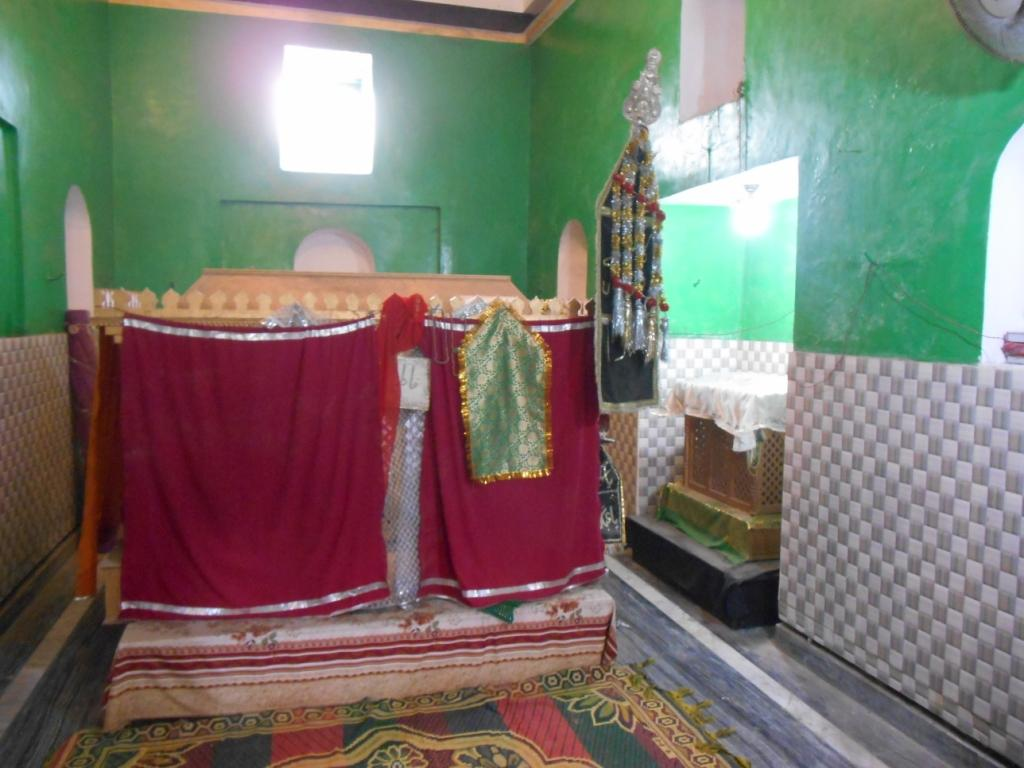
Bait-ul-Huzn at Kaala Imambara, Lucknow

Bait-ul-Huzn is the replica of that place which Ali built for Fatimah to lament for her loving father. After the death of Muhammad Fatimah was so heart broken she lamented for her loving father, but some Muslims objected to this and complained to Ali for this. Lucknow have three replica of Bait-ul-Huzn.

- The first Bait-ul-Huzn is situated in the Rustam Nagar area.
- The second Bait-ul-Huzn is Imambara Baitul Huzn (Aza-e-Husain) situated at Wazirganj, Lucknow
- The third Bait-ul-Huzn is small in size and is situated inside Imambara of Nawab Salaarjung Bahadur (Mirza Muhammad Ali Khan Sahab), (Kaala Imambara), in Peer Bukhara Locality of Lucknow.

=== Rauza of Husain ===
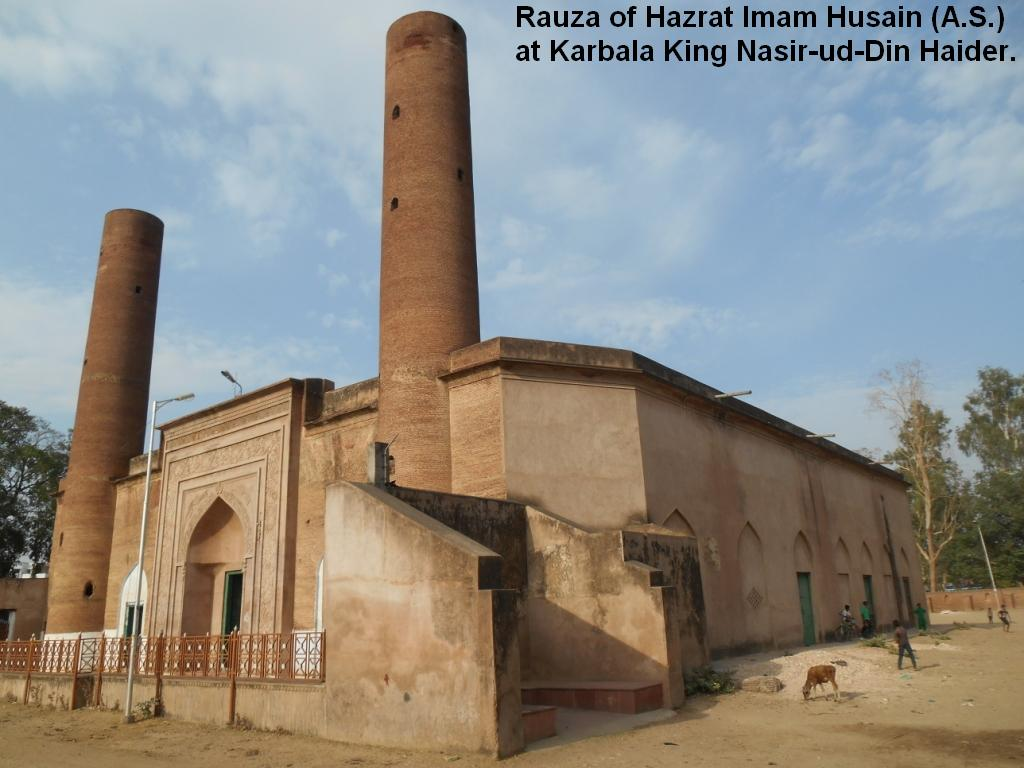
Rauza of Husain at Karbala King Nasir-ud-Din Haider, Lucknow

Lucknow have many Rauzas of Husayn ibn Ali which are often called Karbala as Husain is buried in the city of Karbala, Iraq.

- The oldest Rauza of Husayn ibn Ali is situated in the Karbala Mir Khuda Baksh (Karbala Taal Katora) built on the birth anniversary of Ali in 1817, during the reign of Nawab Ghazi-ud-Din Haider.
- A Second Rauza of Husayn ibn Ali is situated in the Karbala of King Nasir-ud-Din Haider. This Rauza is situated behind Shia P.G. College on Sitapur Road in the Iradat Nagar area of Lucknow. This is the largest Rauza in entire India. The outer construction was left incomplete after the death of King Nasir-ud-Din Haider. The remains of the king is also buried here along with his wife Qudisiya Begam and his maternal uncle.
- The third Rauza of Husayn ibn Ali is situated in the Karbala of Malika Jahan Sahiba (Aishbagh ki Karbala), Aish Bagh, Lucknow. This Karbala was built by Ashiq Ali in the year 1840-41 for which the fund was provided by Malika Jahan Sahiba ( Wife of King Muhammad Ali Shah Bahadur, 3rd King of Awadh).
- The fourth Rauza of Husayn ibn Ali is situated in the Karbala of Dayanat-ud-Daula. It was built in 1851–52 by Dayanat-ud-Daulah, a khwajasara of Nawab Wajid Ali Shah. His original name was Mohammed Ali Khan and Dayanat-ud-Daulah was the title conferred upon him on 13 February 1847, on the occasion of King Wajid Ali Shah's coronation.
- The fifth Rauza of Husayn ibn Ali is situated in the Karbala of Puttan Sahib (Shahzadi Puttan Sahib ki Karbala). This Karbala is situated on Victoria Street in the Bazar Khala area of Lucknow. This Karbala was built by Sahibzadi Asmat Ara Begum, also known as Shahzadi Puttan Sahib (the great, great granddaughter of King Muhammad Ali Shah Bahadur, 3rd King of Awadh).
- The Sixth Rauza of Husayn ibn Ali is situated at Karbala Rafiq-ud-Daulah, (Karbala Abbas Bagh), Balaganj, Lucknow.
- One small scale Rauza of Husayn ibn Ali is situated inside Dargah Abbas Alambardar, Rustam Nagar, Lucknow.
- Another small scale Rauza of Husayn ibn Ali is situated inside Imambara of Nawab Salaarjung Bahadur (Mirza Qasim Ali Khan Sahab), (Kaala Imambara), in Peer Bukhara Locality of Lucknow.

=== Qaima Gah ===
"Qaima Gah" is the shrine constructed over the same spot where the camps of Imam Husain were present during the battle of Karbala. The original shrine is situated at Karbala, Iraq. Lucknow has two "Qaima Gah".

- The first "Qaima Gah" is situated in Karbala Mir Khuda Baksh (Karbala Talkatora). This "Qaima Gah" is a white colored octagonal structure with a dome.
- The second "Qaima Gah" is situated in Kacchi Karbala, adjacent to Karbala of Dayanat-ud-Daula. This "Qaima Gah" is almost same to the original Qaima Gah in Karbala, Iraq.

=== Rauza-e-Zainabiya, Rauza of Zaynab bint Ali ===
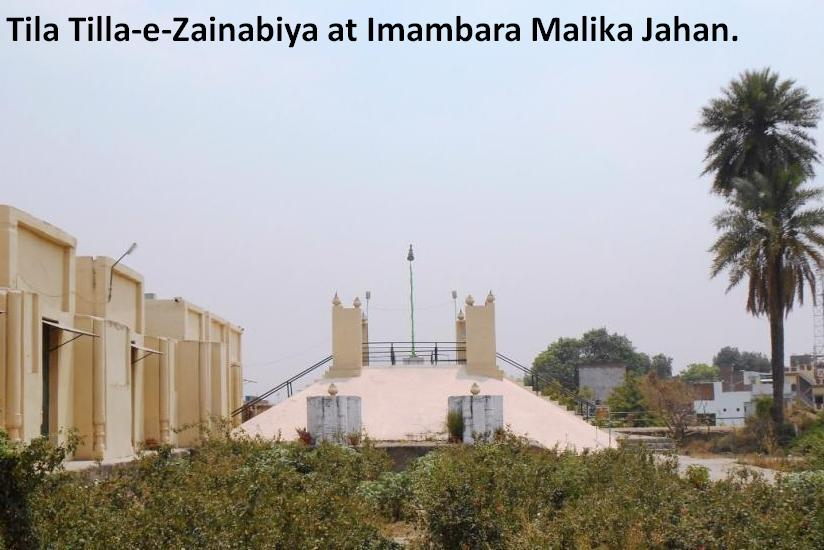
Tila Tilla-e-Zainabiya at Imambara Malika Jahan, Lucknow

Lucknow have two replicas of Rauza-e-Zainabiya, Rauza of Zaynab bint Ali and One Tila-e-Tilla-e-Zanabiya.

- The old Rauza-e-Zainabiya, Rauza of Zaynab bint Ali is situated near Tikat Rai ka Talaab in the area of Mehdi Ganj, Rajaji Puram. This Rauza also has the grave replicas of Bibi Saiyyada Umm-e-Kulsoom, Bibi Saiyyada Sakina and the grave replica of Bibi Fizza The Protector of Ahlebait in the brutal court of Tyrant Yazid.
- The new Rauza-e-Zainabiya, Rauza of Zaynab bint Ali is situated in the Karbala Mir Khuda Baksh (Karbala Taal Katora), This Rauza is under construction.

=== Tila-e-Tilla-e-Zainabiya. ===
Tila-e-Tilla-e-Zainabiya is a pyramid-shaped structure with stairs on all four sides and an Alam (Standard) is mounted on the top of the platform. This shrine is situated at Imambara of Malika Jahan Sahiba, Shahi Jama Masjid, Tahseenganj, Husainabad, Lucknow.

=== Rauza of Abbas ibn Ali ===
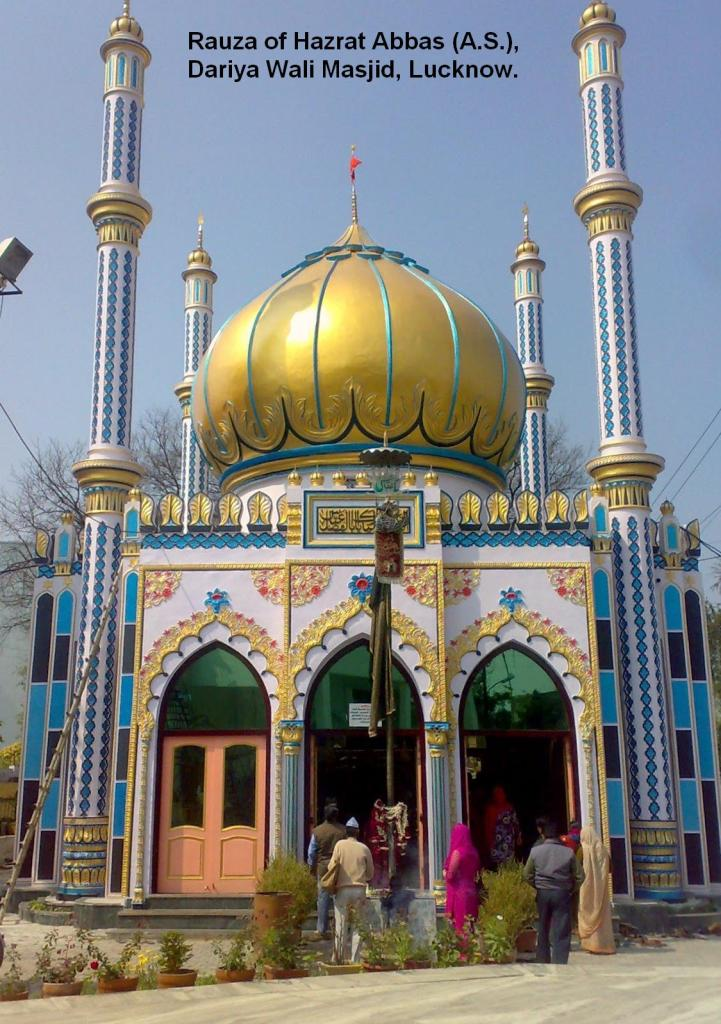
Rauza of Abbas ibn Ali at Dariya Wali Masjid, Lucknow

Lucknow have One Imambara associated with Abbas ibn Ali, Two Dargahs of Abbas ibn Ali and Five Rauzas of Abbas ibn Ali, which are listed below.

- Imambara Agha Baqar Sahab. This Imambara is associated with Abbas ibn Ali. This Imambara is situated at Chowk area. This Imambara is second oldest in Lucknow. Built by Agha Baqar who was commander of 5000 cavalry soldiers during the reign of Nawab Shuja-ud-Daulah. This Imambara also contains the grave of Shahenshah-e-Qasida, A great Urdu poet, Mirza Muhammad Rafi Sauda.
- Dargah Abbas ibn Ali, Rustam Nagar, Lucknow. The Dargah (shrine) came into existence during the reign of Nawab Asaf-ud-Daulah (1775–1797). A poor man, Mirza Faqeera Beg, was visited by Abbas in his dream and directed to dig out his alam from a specific location in the city.
- Dargah Abbas ibn Ali, situated at Karbala Musahab-ud-Daulah, Misri ki Baghiya, Ali Colony, Lucknow. This Karbala also have a Mosque, an Imambara of Bi Misri Sahiba and an Imam Chabutra.
- Rauza of Abbas ibn Ali situated at Karbala Rafiq-ud-Daulah, (Karbala Abbas Bagh), Bala ganj, Lucknow.
- Rauza of Abbas ibn Ali situated at Karbala Amin-ud-Daulah, (Karbala Imdad Husain Khan), Dariya pur, Rajaji Puram, Lucknow.
- Rauza of Abbas ibn Ali situated at Karbala Malika Jahan Sahiba, (Aish Bagh ki Karbala), Aish Bagh, Lucknow. This Karbala was Built by Ashiq Ali in the year 1840-41 for which the fund was provided by Malika Jahan Sahiba ( Wife of King Muhammad Ali Shah Bahadur, 3rd King of Awadh).
- Rauza of Abbas ibn Ali situated at Masjid Ramzan Ali Khan Sahab (Dariya wali Masjid), Near Aasafi Imambara (Bara Imambara), Lucknow.
- Rauza of Abbas ibn Ali situated at the Karbala Mir Khuda Baksh (Karbala Taal Katora), Rajaji Puram, Lucknow.

=== Imambara of Ali Akber ===
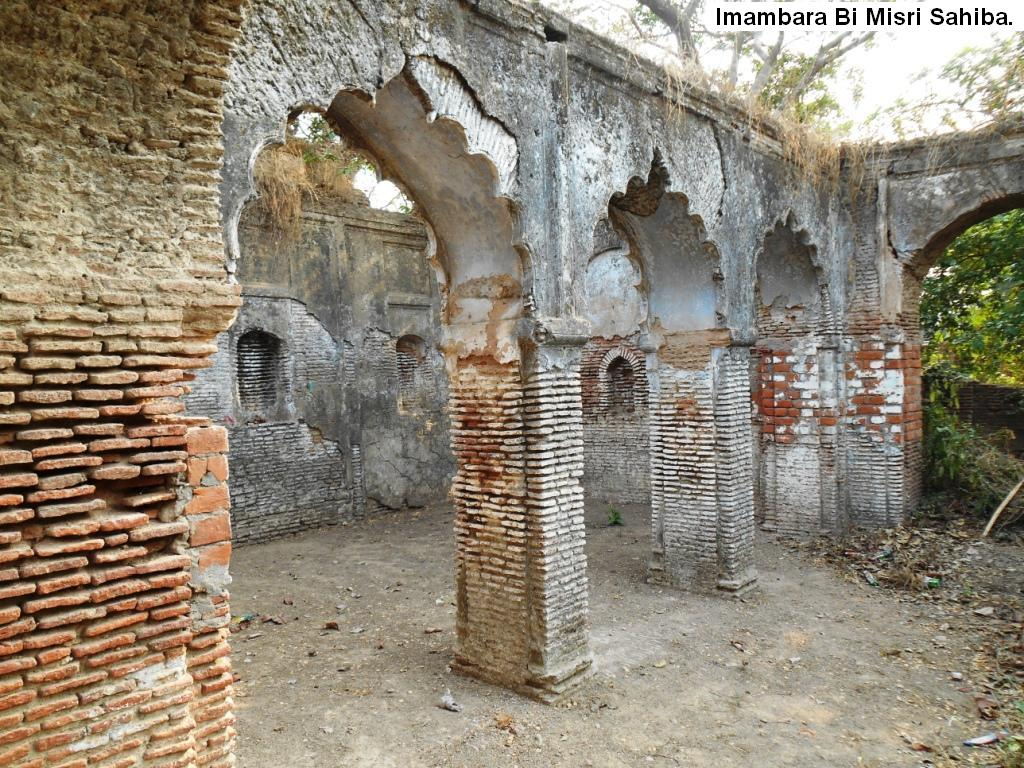
Imambara of Bi Misri Sahiba (Associated with Ali Akber at Karbala Musahab-ud-Daulah, Misri ki Baghiya, Ali Colony, Lucknow

Imambara of Bi Misri Sahiba is situated at Karbala Musahab-ud-Daulah, Misri ki Baghiya, Ali Colony, Lucknow. The Imambara is not in good condition at present. This Karbala also have a Mosque, an Imam Chabutra and a Dargah of Abbas Alambardar.

=== Rauza of Qasim ===
- In Lucknow the Rauza of Qasim is situated at Hazrat Qasim Hall, Rustam Nagar, Lucknow.
- Old Rauza of Qasim was located in the New Hyderabad locality of Nishatganj, Waqf no. 243/199 Imambara known as Karbala Imam Husain (A.S.), Shabeeh Rauza Hazrat Qasim (A.S.). Some traces are still present.
- The Dargah of Qasim is situated at Mohan.

=== Rauza of Sakina ===
Lucknow have few Rauzas of Sakina bint Husayn.

- Rauza of Sakina bint Husayn, situated behind Shahi Jama Masjid, Tahseen Ganj. Built by Late Syed Baqar Husain Sahab of Sharif Manzil. This Rauza is an independent structure with a Green Dome. This Rauza is attached to a small Mosque.
- A Rauza of Sakina bint Husayn is situated inside Dargah Abbas, Rustam Nagar, Lucknow.
- Another Rauza of Sakina bint Husayn is situated inside Dargah Abbas, situated at Karbala Musahab-ud-Daulah, Misri ki Baghiya, Ali Colony, Lucknow.
- One Rauza of Sakina bint Husayn is situated inside Imambara Kaiwan Jah, situated in the Karbala Mir Khuda Baksh (Karbala Taal Katora), Rajaji Puram, Lucknow.
- Another Rauza of Sakina bint Husayn along the grave replica of Bibi Saiyyada Umm-e-Kulsoom is situated inside Rauza-e-Zainabiya near Tikat Rai ka Talaab in the area of Mehdi Ganj, Rajaji Puram.

=== Yaad-e-Sakina "Remembering Sakina bint Husayn" ===
This is a Mourning event organised on the 4th Sunday of the month of Muharram every year at Imambara Husainabad Mubarak (The Chota Imambara), Husainabad. During this grief-stricken event a temporary small scale replica of the "Qaid Khana" (Prison or Dungeon) is constructed with a small grave of Sakina bint Husayn inside this "Qaid Khana" to depict the Agony of Sakina bint Husayn. Thousands of mourners gather here to visit the "Qaid Khana" and to pay tribute to Sakina bint Husayn. This Sorrowful event was founded in 1990 by Late. Muhammad Sarfaraz Khan Sahab (Late. Banney Miya Sahab) of Beal Wala Tila, Muftiganj, Lucknow. The members of Anjuman-e-Gulzaar-e-Panjetan take active part in the organisation and management of this event.

=== Rauza of Musa al-Kazim ===
The original Rauza-e-Kazimain, Tomb (Shrine) of Musa al-Kazim and his Grand Son Muhammad al-Jawad is Situated in the city of Kazimain in Iraq. The tomb have two golden domes and four golden minarets. Lucknow have two Rauzas (Replicas) of Kazimain.

- Karbala Agha Mir or Karbala Moata-mud-Daula, Narhi, Lucknow is the first Rauza-e-Kazimain. It was built in 1815 by Saiyed Mohammad Agha Meer who was given the title of Nawab Moata-mud-Daula Bahadur in 1818. Agha Mir was the prime minister of King Ghazi-ud-Din Haider. After the Mutiny Britishers confiscated the properties and religious places of Shia Muslims for their active participation in the first war of independence of 1857. Monument came under the illegal possession of East India Company in February 1856 and later they handed it over to Freemasons.
- The second Rauza-e-Kazimain is Karbala Sharaf-ud-Daula (Kazimain Building) situated in Sahadat Ganj. This Rauza was built by a converted Shia "Jagannath Agarwal" who was bestowed with the title of ‘Sharf-Ud-Daula’ by King Amjad Ali Shah. The constructed started in the Regime of King Amjad Ali Shah(4th King of Awadh) and was completed in the year 1852 during the regime of King Wajid Ali Shah (5th and last King of Awadh). Kazimain also remains hub of Muharram rituals throughout the mourning period of Muharram, which is two months and eight days. The famous procession of 8th Rabi-ul-Awwal also culminate at Kazimain and witness a very aggressive Seenazani and Zanjeer ka Matam by the devotees.

=== Rauza of Ali al-Ridha ===
The original Rauza or Tomb (Shrine) of Ali al-Ridha is situated at the city of Mashhad, Iran. Lucknow have a replica of Rauza of Ali al-Ridha which is situated at Karbala Azimullah Khan, near Karbala Mir Khuda Baksh (Karbala Taal Katora), Rajaji Puram, Lucknow. This rauza also have a Mosque by the name "Masjid-e-Gauhar Shaad" adjacent to the Rauza. This Mosque is also a small scale replica of "Masjid-e-Gauhar Shaad" in Mashhad, Iran.

=== Rauza of Fatima al-Kubra ===
- The Rauza of Fatima al-Kubra is situated at Karbala Azimullah Khan, near Karbala Mir Khuda Baksh (Karbala Taal Katora), Rajaji Puram, Lucknow.
- A small scale Zarih of Fatima al-Kubra is also kept inside Bait-ul-Huza at Imambara of Nawab Salaarjung Bahadur (Kaala Imambara), in Peer Bukhara Locality of Lucknow.

=== Rauza of Ali ibn Muhammad, Ali al-Hadi, Ali an-Naqi ===
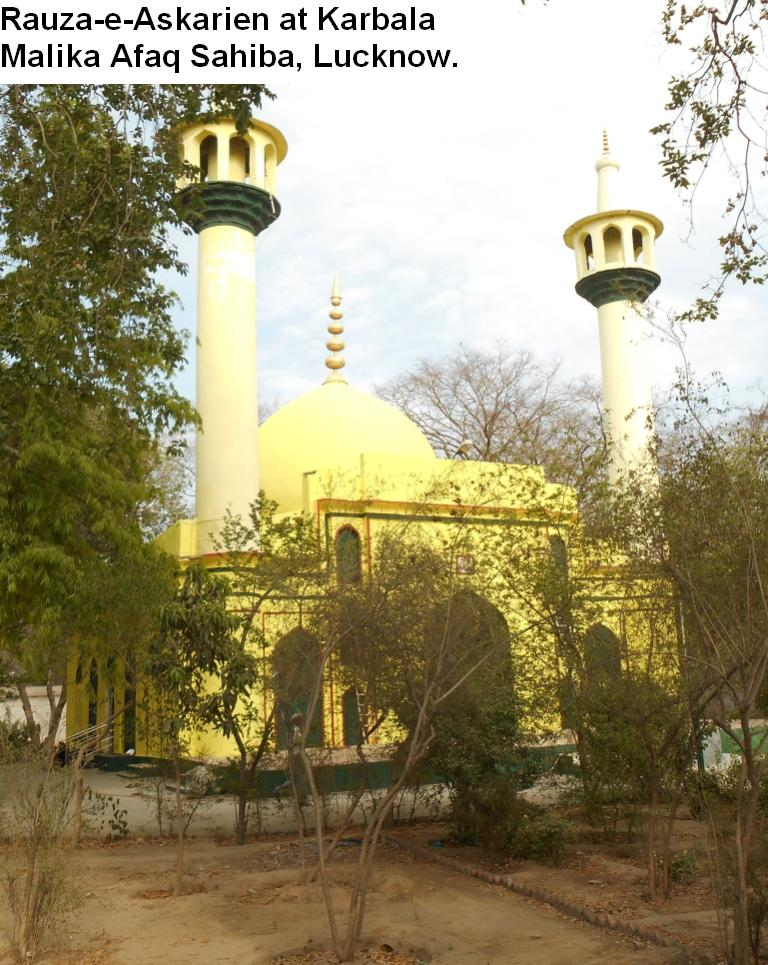
Rauza-e-Askarien at Karbala Malika Afaq Sahiba, Lucknow

The Rauza of Ali an-Naqi is situated at Karbala of Malika Afaq Sahiba (Karbala-e-Askarien) (Gaar wali Karbala). The Karbala was built in the year 1837-42 by Malika Afaq Sahiba who was the wife of third king of Awadh Muhammad Ali Shah Bahadur.

Beneath the dome are four graves, those of Alī an-Naqī and his son, Hasan Al-Askari, Janab-e-Hakimah Khatoon, the sister of Alī an-Naqī, Janab-e-Nargis Khatoon, the mother of Mehndi.

=== Rauza of Hasan al-Askari ===
In Lucknow the Rauza of Hasan al-Askari is situated at Karbala of Malika Afaq Sahiba (Karbala-e-Askarien) (Gaar wali Karbala).

=== Mosque of Muhammad-al-Mahdi ===
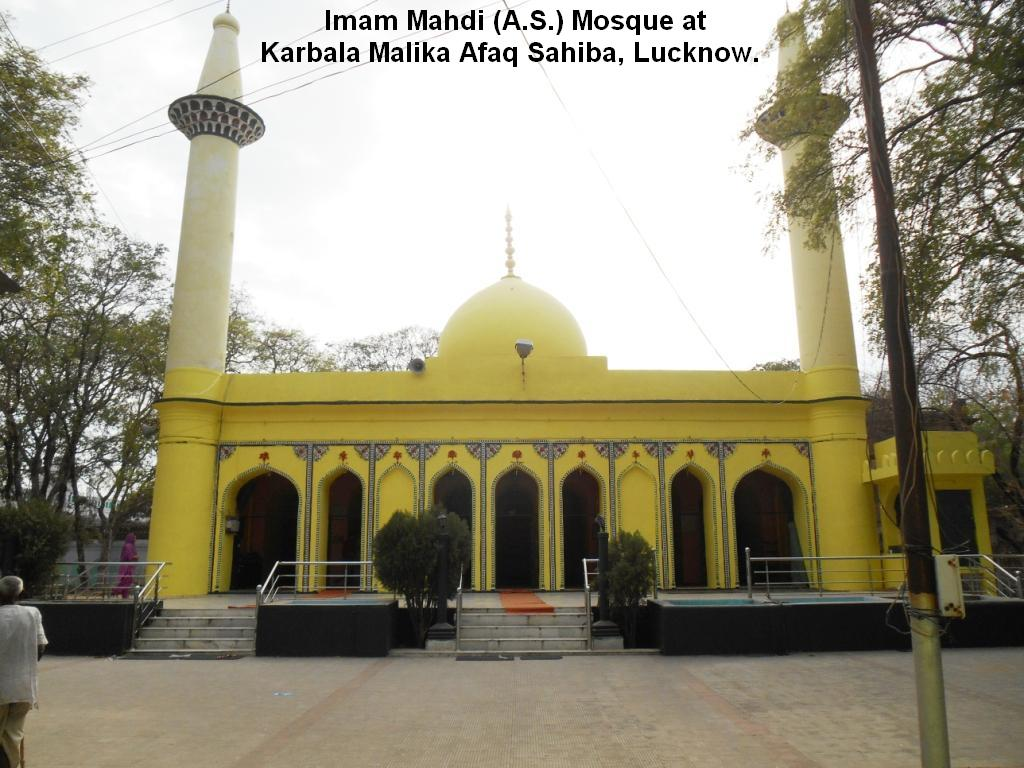
Mahdi Mosque at Karbala Malika Afaq Sahiba, Lucknow

In Lucknow the Mosque of Muhammad al-Mahdi is situated at Karbala of Malika Afaq Sahiba (Karbala-e-Askarien) (Gaar wali Karbala). Ghar wali Karbala also has the similar pattern and devotees enter cave by the flight of stairs. Arrangement for holding Majlises and Namaz has also been made by erecting a hall over the cave.

=== Rauza of Muslim ibn Aqeel ===
Muslim ibn Aqeel was the Cousin, Brother-in-Law and Ambassador of Husain. The original Rauza of Muslim ibn Aqeel is situated at Masjid-e-Kufa, Kufa, Iraq. Lucknow have two Rauza of Muslim ibn Aqeel.

- The first and the oldest Rauza of Muslim ibn Aqeel is situated at Masjid-e-Kufa, in Karbala Sharaf-ud-Daula (Kaizmain Building) situated in Sahadat Ganj.
- The second Rauza of Muslim ibn Aqeel is situated at Rais Manzil, Husainabad.

=== Rauza of Muhammad and Ibrahim ===
Muhammad and Ibrahim were the sons of Muslim and Bibi Saiyyada Ruqayyah {Daughter of Imam Ali}. After Muslim was martyred, Muhammad and Ibrahim were also arrested and put into a dungeon. Muhammad was just eight years old and Ibrahim was ten years old.

The two innocent children were killed brutally near the river of Euphrates on 12th Zil-Hijja, 60 AH and are buried near the town of Musayyib, Babil Province, Iraq. Lucknow has one Rauza of Muhammad and Ibrahim.

- This Rauza of Muhammad and Ibrahim is situated at Karbala Munshi Fazl-e-Husain Khan Sahab in the Bazar Khala area on Victoria Street, Lucknow.

=== Rauza of Hani ibne Urwah ===
The martyrdom of Hani ibne Urwah is also a very touching part of Karbala revolution. He was executed on the orders of Ibn Ziyad, Governor of Kufa, after the martyrdom of Muslim bin Aqeel. Hani ibne Urwah lost his life for playing host to Muslim bin Aqeel, the ambassador of Imam Hussain and refusing to handover him to the Governor Ibn Ziyad (L.A.). The original Rauza of Hani ibn Urwa is situated at Masjid-e-Kufa, Kufa, Iraq. Lucknow has two Rauza of Hani ibn Urwa.

- The oldest Rauza of Hani ibn Urwa is situated at Masjid-e-Kufa, in Karbala Sharaf-ud-Daula (Kaizmain Building) situated in Sahadat Ganj.
- The second Rauza of Hani ibne Urwah is situated at Rais Manzil, Husainabad.

=== Rauza of Hur ===
"Al-Hurr ibn Yazid al Tamimi" was among the first martyrs of Karbala. He was also martyred along with his son on 10th Muharram, 61 AH (10 October 680 AD) in the battle of Karbala. The original Rauza of Hur is situated at Karbala, Iraq. Lucknow has one Rauza of Hur.

- Once the Rauza of Hur was located in the area of Suppa, near Tikat Rai ka Talab, in Umrao Mahal Waqf, but this Rauza no longer exist. Only the Mosque exists.

=== Rauza of Mukhtar ===
Mukhtar {Mukhtar bin Abu Ubaid} was also known as "al-Mukhtār ibn Abī Ubaydah al-Thaqafī", "Mukhtar-e-Thaqafi". He was born in Taif (near Mecca, Saudi Arabia) in the First year of Hijri (622 AD). Mukhtar avenged the death of Imam Husain and the martyrs of Karbala. Later at the age of 67 Mukhtar along with his 17 companions was also martyred on 14th Ramzan 67 AH (3 April 687 AD). After that his wife "Bibi al-Numan bin Bashher al-Ansary" was taken captive to a place in the desert between Hira and Kufa where she was beheaded. Mukhtar is buried near Masjid-e-Kufa, Kufa Iraq.

In Lucknow the Rauza of Mukhtar is built inside Rauza of Muslim situated at Rais Manzil, Husainabad.

== See also ==
- Azadari in Lucknow
- Bara Imambara (One of the oldest Imambara of Lucknow).
- Chota Imambara
- Imambara Shah Najaf
- Imambara Ghufran Ma'ab
